= Canadian Forces base =

Military installation of the Canadian Armed Forces

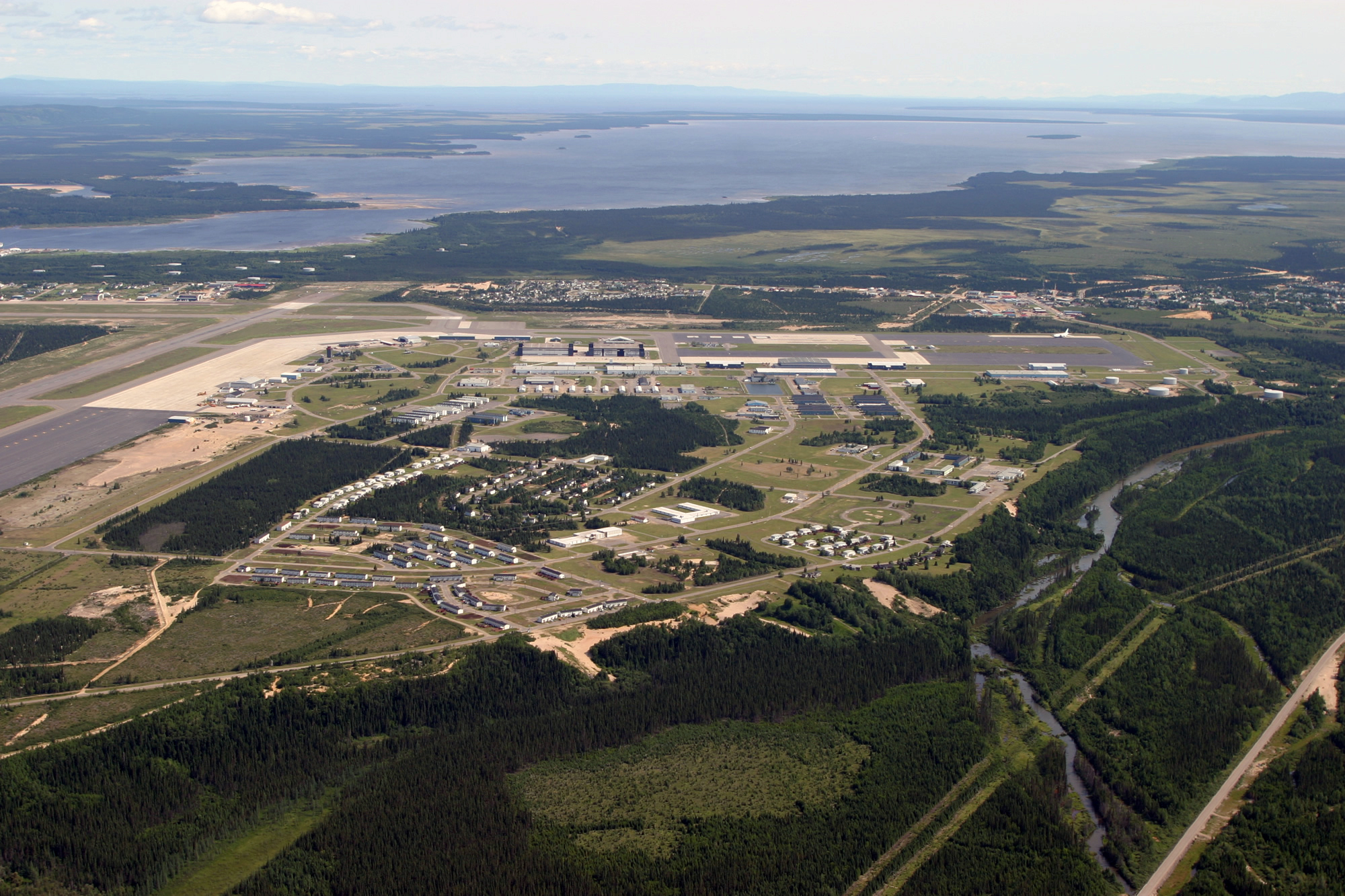
Canadian Forces Base Goose Bay

A Canadian Forces base (CFB; French: base des Forces canadiennes, BFC) is a military installation of the Canadian Armed Forces. For a facility to qualify as a Canadian Forces base, it must station one or more major units (e.g., army regiments, navy ships, air force wings).

Minor installations are named Canadian Forces station (CFS; French: station des Forces canadiennes, SFC). A Canadian Forces station could host a single minor unit (e.g., an early-warning radar station). Many of these facilities are now decommissioned for administrative purposes and function as detachments of a larger Canadian Forces base nearby.

== Current ==
=== Canadian Army ===
Note: Primary lodger units at Canadian Forces bases used by the Canadian Army are regiments of the Canadian Army.

Canadian Forces bases (Army) locations.

Alberta:

- CFB Edmonton
- CFB Suffield
- CFB Wainwright

Manitoba:

- CFB Shilo

New Brunswick:

- CFB Gagetown

Ontario:

- CFB Kingston
- CFB Borden
- Garrison Petawawa

Quebec:

- CFB Montreal
- CFB Valcartier

=== Royal Canadian Navy ===
Note: Primary lodger units at Canadian Forces bases used by the Royal Canadian Navy are individual commissioned ships of the RCN.

Canadian Forces base (RCN) locations.

British Columbia:

- CFB Esquimalt

Nova Scotia:

- CFB Halifax

Newfoundland and Labrador

- CFS St. John's

Nunavut:

- Naval Facility Nanisivik

=== Royal Canadian Air Force ===
Note: Primary lodger units at Canadian Forces bases used by the Royal Canadian Air Force are wings of the RCAF.

Canadian Forces base (RCAF) locations.

Alberta:

- CFB Cold Lake

British Columbia:

- CFB Comox

Manitoba:

- CFB Winnipeg (CFAD Dundurn)

Newfoundland and Labrador:

- CFB Gander
- CFB Goose Bay

Nova Scotia:

- CFB Greenwood
- CFB Shearwater

Ontario:

- CFB Kingston
- CFB Borden
- CFB North Bay
- CFB Trenton (CFD Mountain View)

Quebec:

- CFB Bagotville

Saskatchewan:

- CFB Moose Jaw

The RCAF supplies aircraft to Canadian Joint Operations Command, which frequently operate from a chain of forward operating locations (FOLs) at various civilian airfields across northern Canada, capable of supporting RCAF operations. CF-18 Hornets, CP-140 Auroras and various transport and search and rescue aircraft periodically deploy to these FOLs for short training exercises, Arctic sovereignty patrols, aid to the civil power, or search and rescue operations.

=== All services ===
Remaining Canadian Armed Forces locations.

Northwest Territories

- CFNA HQ Yellowknife

Nunavut

- CFS Alert

Ontario

- Department of National Defence Headquarters, Ottawa
- NDHQ Carling, Ottawa
- CFS Leitrim, Ottawa
- Connaught Range and Primary Training Centre (CRPTC), Ottawa

Quebec

- Citadelle of Quebec, Quebec
- Canadian Forces Leadership and Recruit School (CFLRS)

Yukon

- CFNA HQ Whitehorse

== Closed ==
=== Defunct bases ===
Alberta:

- CFB Calgary (portion of property currently hosts 41 Canadian Brigade Group Headquarters (Waters Building), 41 Combat Engineer Regiment (Currie Building) and 41 Service Battalion (Currie Building).
- CFB Penhold

British Columbia:

- CFB Chilliwack (portion of property currently hosts ASU Chilliwack)

Manitoba:

- CFB Winnipeg (Kapyong Barracks)
- CFB Portage La Prairie
- CFB Rivers

New Brunswick:

- CFB Chatham
- CFB Moncton (portion of property currently hosts CFB Gagetown - Detachment Moncton)

Nova Scotia:

- CFB Cornwallis
- CFB Shearwater (Shearwater Heliport now part of CFB Halifax)

Ontario:

- CFB Clinton
- CFB Centralia
- CFB Downsview (portion of property currently hosts ASU Toronto)
- CFB London (Wolseley Barracks) (portion of property currently hosts ASU London)
- CFB Picton
- CFB Rockcliffe
- CFB Uplands

Prince Edward Island:

- CFB Summerside

Quebec:

- CFB St. Hubert
- CFB St. Jean (now home to the CF Leadership and Recruit School, a lodger unit of CFB Montreal)

Other:

- CFB Baden-Soellingen, Germany
- CFB Lahr, Germany

=== Defunct stations ===
Alberta:

- CFS Beaverlodge

British Columbia:

- CFS Aldergrove
- CFS Baldy Hughes
- CFS Holberg
- CFS Kamloops
- CFS Ladner
- CFS Masset (now a detachment of CFS Leitrim)

Manitoba:

- CFS Beausejour
- CFS Churchill
- CFS Flin Flon
- CFS Gypsumville

New Brunswick:

- CFS Coverdale
- CFS Renous
- CFS St. Margarets

Nova Scotia:

- CFS Barrington
- CFS Debert
- CFS Mill Cove
- CFS Newport Corner
- CFS Shelburne
- CFS Sydney

Newfoundland and Labrador:

- CFS Gander (Now CFB Gander)
- CFS Goose Bay (Now CFB Goose Bay)
- CFS Saglek

Northwest Territories:

- CFS Inuvik

Nunavut:

- CFS Frobisher Bay

Ontario:

- CFS Armstrong
- CFS Carp
- CFS Cobourg
- CFS Falconbridge
- CFS Foymount
- CFS Gloucester
- CFS Lowther
- CFS Moosonee
- CFS Ramore
- CFS Sioux Lookout

Quebec:

- CFS Chibougamau
- CFS Moisie
- CFS Mont Apica
- CFS Lac St. Denis
- CFS Senneterre
- RCAF Station Parent
- CFS Val-d'Or

Saskatchewan:

- CFS Alsask
- CFS Dana
- CFS Yorkton

Yukon:

- CFS Whitehorse

Other:

- CFS Bermuda, Bermuda
- CFB Baden–Soellingen, Germany
- CFB Lahr, Germany
- RCAF Station Marville, France
- RCAF Station Grostenquin, France
- RCAF Station Zweibrücken, Germany

The Canadian Forces were reduced during the 1990s from a high of 90,000 personnel in the late 1980s to the present force levels. Coinciding with personnel and equipment reductions was the politically controversial decision to close a number of bases and stations which were obsolete or created duplication.

A small number of these "closed" facilities have actually continued operating as before; but, because of cost and administrative efficiency—or, in the case of radio and radar facilities, automation—, they have been absorbed into other nearby bases and therefore do not qualify for separate designations. For example, the CF Leadership and Recruit School at St. Jean, Quebec, is now a lodger unit of CFB Montreal, and the former CFS Masset is a detachment of CFS Leitrim. Other facilities are now used as training grounds for reserve/militia units.

== See also ==
- List of Royal Canadian Air Force stations
- List of Royal Canadian Navy stations
- List of military installations in Canada
- List of military installations in Newfoundland and Labrador
