= List of Royal Canadian Navy bases (1911–1968) =

This is a list of shore-based facilities operated by the Royal Canadian Navy (RCN) from its creation in 1911 until unification into the Canadian Forces on February 1, 1968.

All RCN shore-based facilities in this period followed the naming tradition of the Royal Navy, whereby the prefix HMCS or Naval Radio Station (NRS), was affixed. This tradition is somewhat maintained under the RCN's successor, Canadian Forces Maritime Command where certain facilities such as HMCS Trinity and NRS Aldergrove, are still formally referred to in this fashion, likely out of tradition, however the entire bases at the deep water ports of Victoria and Halifax are now referred to as a Canadian Forces Base or CFB. For Canadian Forces Bases operated by the modern Royal Canadian Navy see Canadian Forces Bases#Royal Canadian Navy.

== Primary deep water ports ==
=== British Columbia ===
- HMC Dockyard Esquimalt
- HMCS Naden
- HMCS Nanoose Bay

=== Nova Scotia ===
- HMC Dockyard Halifax
- HMCS Shelburne
- HMCS Protector

== Naval Air Stations ==
=== British Columbia ===
- HMCS Comox
- HMCS Patricia Bay (Patricia Bay) – West Camp of the former RCAF Patricia Bay was used by the RCN from 1954 to 1968 and by the CF Maritime Command from 1968 to 1974; now part of Victoria International Airport.

=== Nova Scotia ===
- RCNAS Shearwater (co-located with RCAF Station Shearwater)

== Auxiliary bases and stations ==
=== British Columbia ===
- HMCS Royal Roads(closed)
- NRS Aldergrove
- NRS Masset
- HMCS Naden – within Esquimalt Naval Base

=== New Brunswick ===
- HMCS Coverdale (Coverdale, New Brunswick) – intercept and high-frequency direction-finding station 1944-1971; sold to New Brunswick government and now absorbed into nearby residential community (some areas left abandoned).
- HMCS Renous – (Renous, New Brunswick) – ammunition depot 1943-1966; merged with former RCAF Station Chatham and RCAF Station St. Margarets to form CFB Chatham in 1966. Renamed Canadian Forces Ammunition Depot Renous (CFAD Renous) and closed in 1973; located on the north bank of the Southwest Miramichi River, near the mouth of the Renous River, 46 km (29 mi) west of the radar station at St Margarets and 35 km (22 mi) southwest of the air base at Chatham. The property has been re-purposed for a federal penitentiary named the Atlantic Institution.

=== Nova Scotia ===
- HMCS Cornwallis
- HMCS Stadacona
- HMCS Newport Corner
- HMCS Albro Lake
- HMCS Mount Uniacke – former radio station closed and abandoned

=== Bermuda ===
- HMCS Somers Isle
- NRS Bermuda

== See also ==
- List of Naval Reserve divisions for a list of Canadian Forces Naval Reserve facilities, some of which were used by the RCN's reserve
- List of military installations in Canada
