= Dartmouth North Community Centre =

Community centre in Nova Scotia, Canada

Coordinates: 44°41′02.33″N 63°35′19.37″W

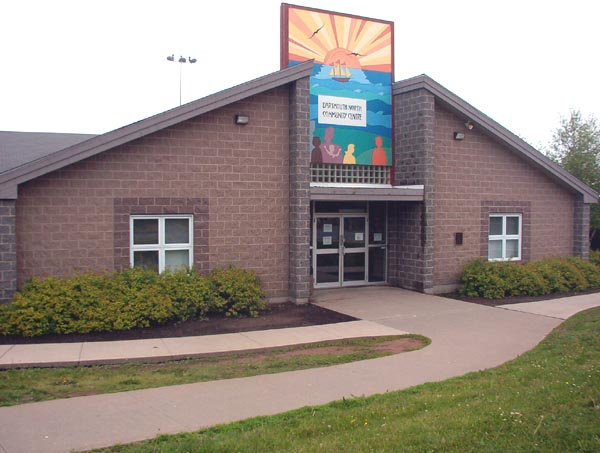
Dartmouth North Community Centre

Dartmouth North Community Centre is a community centre in Albro Lake, a neighbourhood in the north end of the community of Dartmouth in Nova Scotia's Halifax Regional Municipality. Albro Lake is also known as District 9.

== The DNCC ==
The Dartmouth North Community Center was officially opened on March 22, 1996, at its past location on 134 Pinecrest Drive. The Centre is now located at 105 Highfield Park Drive in Dartmouth. The center was created through a cooperative effort between the municipal, provincial, federal governments through the Canada/Nova Scotia Infrastructure Work Program, which allotted $1.7 million to build the facility and created twenty jobs at the time of the centre's initial opening. The center has expanded since its opening and offers a variety of services, programs and resources to the community which includes a C@P site, job search services, seniors activities, and children's and youth activities. There is also a branch of Halifax Regional Library an office of the Halifax Regional Police as well as the Department of Parks and Recreation in the building.

== History of the community ==
First occupants of the area were industrial workers as this area was the location for several industrial factories. The industrial factories were set up in the early 19th century by John Albro and his brother Samuel (after whom the community is named). The two brothers established the area as an industrial hub with a nail factory, tannery and barking mill. The Naval Radio Station in Albro Lake is another feature of the community. It served as a naval radio communications station for the Atlantic Coast set up in 1942. The site was developed in order to cope with the North Atlantic U-boat threat in WWII. The site was renamed HMC NRS Albro Lake on July 1, 1956, and remained such until its closure in 1968. Near the end of WWII the area was a residential subdivision until 1961 when it was amalgamated into the city of Dartmouth

== Neighbouring schools ==
- John Martin Junior High School (6-9), 7 Brule Street, Dartmouth, NS, B3A-4G2
- Harbour View Elementary (P-6), 25 Alfred Street, Dartmouth, NS, B3A-4E8
- Dartmouth High School (10-12), 95 Victoria Road, Dartmouth, NS, B3A-1V2
- There is also the school John MacNeil Elementary school on Leaman Drive which is the closest to this area.
