= Albro =

Albro is a surname. Notable people with the surname include:

- John Albro (1764–1839), Canadian merchant and politician
- John Albro (settler) (c. 1617–1712), English settler of the Colony of Rhode Island and Providence Plantations
- Maxine Albro (1893–1966), American painter, muralist, lithographer, mosaic artist, and sculptor
