= Catskill =

Catskill may refer to the following in the U.S. state of New York:

- Catskill (town), New York, in Greene County
  - Catskill (village), New York, in the above town
- Catskill Creek, a tributary of the Hudson River
- Catskill Mountains
  - Catskill Park, a protected area in the Catskill Mountains
- Bark mill, also known as Catskill's mill
