= Naval Radio Section Aldergrove =

Canadian naval radio facility

Coordinates: 49°05′00″N 122°29′00″W

Naval Radio Section Aldergrove, or NRS Aldergrove, is a Canadian Forces naval radio communications facility located in both Aldergrove and Matsqui, British Columbia.

NRS Aldergrove is the Royal Canadian Navy's primary communications relay site for Maritime Forces Pacific. The Aldergrove receiving site is located 59 kilometres east of Vancouver, British Columbia in the community of Aldergrove whereas the Matsqui transmitter site is located 21 kilometres northeast of Aldergrove.

The Aldergrove receiving site comprises 1,220 acres (4.9 km^{2}) while Matsqui comprises 230 acres (0.93 km^{2}). About 440 acres (1.8 km^{2}) of the Aldergrove site are used for the antenna field, while the remainder is used as an electromagnetic interference (EMI) buffer zone from local development. Currently, Aldergrove and Matsqui are staffed with 1 operator and between 15 and 17 technicians.

NRS Aldergrove held the traditional naval designation of HMCS Aldergrove from 1956 to 1967 and Canadian Forces Station Aldergrove (or CFS Aldergrove) from 1967 to 1996. Downsizing and automation in the mid-1990s led to the facility becoming a detachment of CFB Esquimalt, rather than an independent Canadian Forces station.

== History ==
In December 1942, the Royal Canadian Navy established a wireless telegraph broadcast station in Matsqui, British Columbia. The following November, a wireless telegraph receiver station was established in Aldergrove, British Columbia. These stations served to meet the regional needs of the RCN during World War II. Staffing levels were reduced following the war.

In the 1950s, as the Korean War erupted in Asia, HMCS Aldergrove experienced growth common to many North American military bases during the early years of the Cold War. With the unification of the Canadian Forces in 1967, the station designation was changed to CFS Aldergrove. By now, the station was providing ship–shore and air–ground communications for Canadian and Allied military forces on the Pacific coast.

From 1975 to 1978, CFS Aldergrove once again underwent major building and upgrading programmes to meet the operational and support needs of the fleet. This included the addition of a microwave radio relay tower, providing over-the-horizon communications. The station was again upgraded in the mid 1990s replacing older, maintenance-intensive equipment with modern and more reliable electronics.

Extensive cutbacks to the defence budget during the post-Cold War era of the early 1990s resulted in CFS Aldergrove being placed under remote control and came under the command of CFB Esquimalt. The transmitter and receiver sites became operated by the Remote Control and Monitoring System (RCMS). This resulted in staff reductions from more than 130 personnel to about 20. Current staffing consists of a core of technicians who perform routine maintenance and repair equipment failures. For fault tolerance and backup, CFB Esquimalt can operate the receiver and transmitter sites at NRS Mill Cove and NRS Newport Corner (in Nova Scotia) respectively. CFB Halifax can also operate the receivers and transmitters at Aldergrove and Matsqui.

Between 1996 and 2006, several buildings on the station were dismantled, including the single quarters, the station's water tower, and the junior ranks mess. Since the downsizing, the site has been plagued by crime on its property, and has had several security breaches. This led to the demolition of the housing formerly located on 272 Street.

In August 2012 construction began on a new construction engineering facility (CEF) for the air force. Construction is expected to be completed in the fall of 2013. Once completed, the facility will be occupied by 192 CEF. The new building is located on 272 Street, south of the main gate.

In the summer of 2019 the Regional Cadet Support Unit (Pac) established a Forward Deployed Office at CFS Aldergrove to support the cadet program in the Fraser Valley and Surrey/Langley areas. Two RCSU(P) Zone Training Officers are based out of the NRS Aldergrove FDO.

== Primary reserve and cadets ==
NRS Aldergrove is home to several primary reserve and cadet units

- B Troop, 15th Field Artillery Regiment, RCA
- B Company, The Royal Westminster Regiment
- 169 Columbia Royal Canadian Sea Cadet Corps
- 1922 Royal Canadian Army Cadet Corps, "Royal Westminster Regiment"
- Navy League Cadet Corps 125 Columbia

== Commanding officers ==
- Lt Riddell, R.M. 1 December 1942 – 14 December 1945 Deceased
- Lt Blackmore, DSK 14 December 1945 – 2 March 1947 Deceased
- C.O. Hibbert, W 3 March 1947 – 1 January 1949 Deceased
- Lt Hall, J.S. 2 January 1949 – 22 February 1951 Deceased
- Lt Miskimmin RR, WH 23 February 1951 – 24 February 1952 Deceased
- Lt Cupples, A.M 25 February 1952 – 22 July 1952
- Lt Miskimmin, WH 23 July 1952 – 30 May 1955 Deceased
- LCdr Stewart, J.R.K. 31 May 1955 – 26 October 1958 Deceased
- LCdr Pearce, G.D. 27 October 1958 – 3 November 1960
- LCdr Machan, S.G 4 November 1960 – 28 May 1963
- Lt Siddons, J.N. 29 May 1963 – 25 July 1965
- LCdr Ellerton, J.H. 26 July 1965 – 11 November 1969 Deceased
- LCdr Henderson, W.D 12 July 1969 – 18 September 1972 Deceased
- LCdr Dykes, R.M. 19 September 1972 – 14 May 1974 Deceased
- LCdr Hall, W.H. 15 May 1974 – 9 September 1976
- LCdr Cameron, M.D. 10 September 1976 – 19 June 1979
- LCdr Johnston, P.L. 11 September 1979 – 26 July 1981
- LCdr Poole, W.J. 27 July 1981 – 11 July 1984 Deceased
- LCdr Stanley, M.E. 11 July 1984 – 22 July 1988 Deceased
- LCdr Van Ek, O. 22 July 1988 – 26 July 1991
- LCdr Wolfe, T 26 July 1991 – 22 July 1994
- Lt Munro, D.J. 22 July 1994 – 26 August 1994
- LCdr Darlington, C.A.H. * 27 August 1994 – 31 March 1996

Note: LCdr Darlington was the last C.O. of CFS Aldergrove before it was downgraded to a detachment of CFB Esquimalt. On 31 March 1996, Aldergrove was disbanded and ceased being a Canadian Forces Station, instead being referred to as Naval Radio Section Aldergrove.

== Detachment commanders ==
- LCdr Darlington, C.A.H. 31 March 1996 – July 1996
- Lt(N) Lafontaine, P.J. July 1996 – July 1997
- Lt(N) Duke, Peter July 1997 – July 2000
- Lt(N) Hansen, Garry July 2000 – July 2002

== Badge ==
Blazon: Barry wavy of ten Argent and Azure, a Caduceus from the head of which issue three forks of lightning pointing to the dexter, centre and sinister chief respectively, Or, between two alder leaves conjoined on one stem Gules.

Significance: The Caduceus is the attribute of Hermes of Greek mythology, who was the messenger or herald of the gods. It is used here as a symbol of one who carries, sends or receives messages. The fact that these particular messages are transmitted by means of radio is indicated by the three flashes of lightning that shoot out from the head of the Caduceus.

The name Aldergrove is indicated by a sprig of two alder leaves; these are shown red because there is a subspecies of red alder common in the area where the base is located.

Ship's colours: white and red

Motto: Loud and Clear
