= Cambridge Library =

Cambridge Library may refer to:

- Cambridge University Library, the main library of Cambridge University, England
- Cambridge Public Library, in Cambridge, Massachusetts
- Cambridge Military Library, Halifax, Nova Scotia

== See also ==
- Libraries of the University of Cambridge
