= Royal Artillery Park =

Military installation in Halifax, Canada

Coordinates: 44.6447°N 63.5766°W

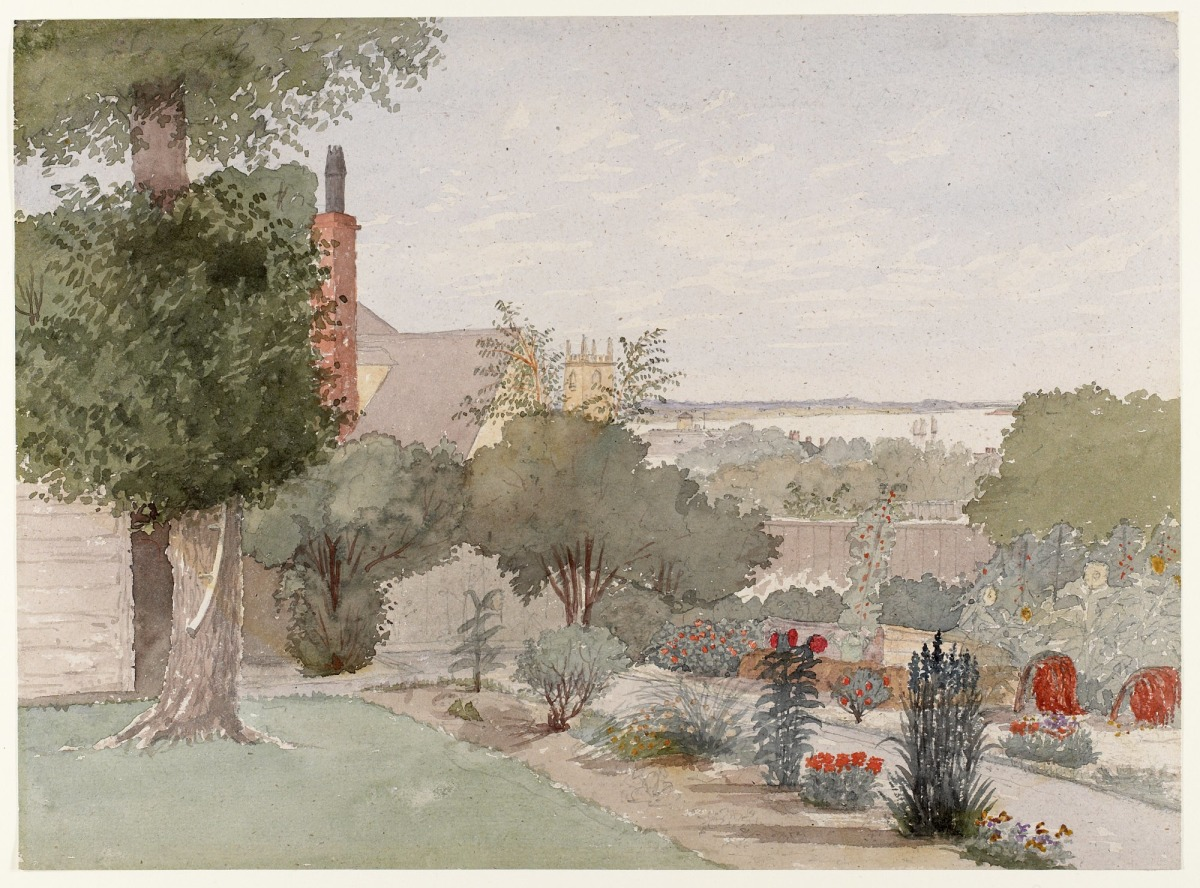
Artillery Park, Halifax (1842) by General Cavalié Mercer. Watercolour in the National Gallery of Canada.

Royal Artillery (RA) Park, a military installation in Halifax, Nova Scotia, Canada, forms part of Canadian Forces Base Halifax. It is home to the headquarters of 36 Canadian Brigade Group and the official residence of the Commander of the 5th Canadian Division. On the grounds of RA Park are the oldest military officers' mess in Canada (1816) and the Cambridge Military Library, which houses one of the oldest library collections in the country (1810). Royal Artillery Park was initially funded from the conquest of present-day Maine, which was renamed the colony of New Ireland.

== History ==
In the far corner of the Royal Artillery Park, a diminutive red brick building, is the Cambridge Military Library. This building was the social and literary centre of military Halifax. The Library opened in 1817 at Grafton Street, as an alternative to the more notorious choices of city entertainment. It moved to its present location in Royal Artillery Park in 1886 and was renamed Cambridge Military Library in 1902. The library was funded in part from Customs receipts gathered during the War of 1812 at the Battle of Hampden.

== Gallery ==
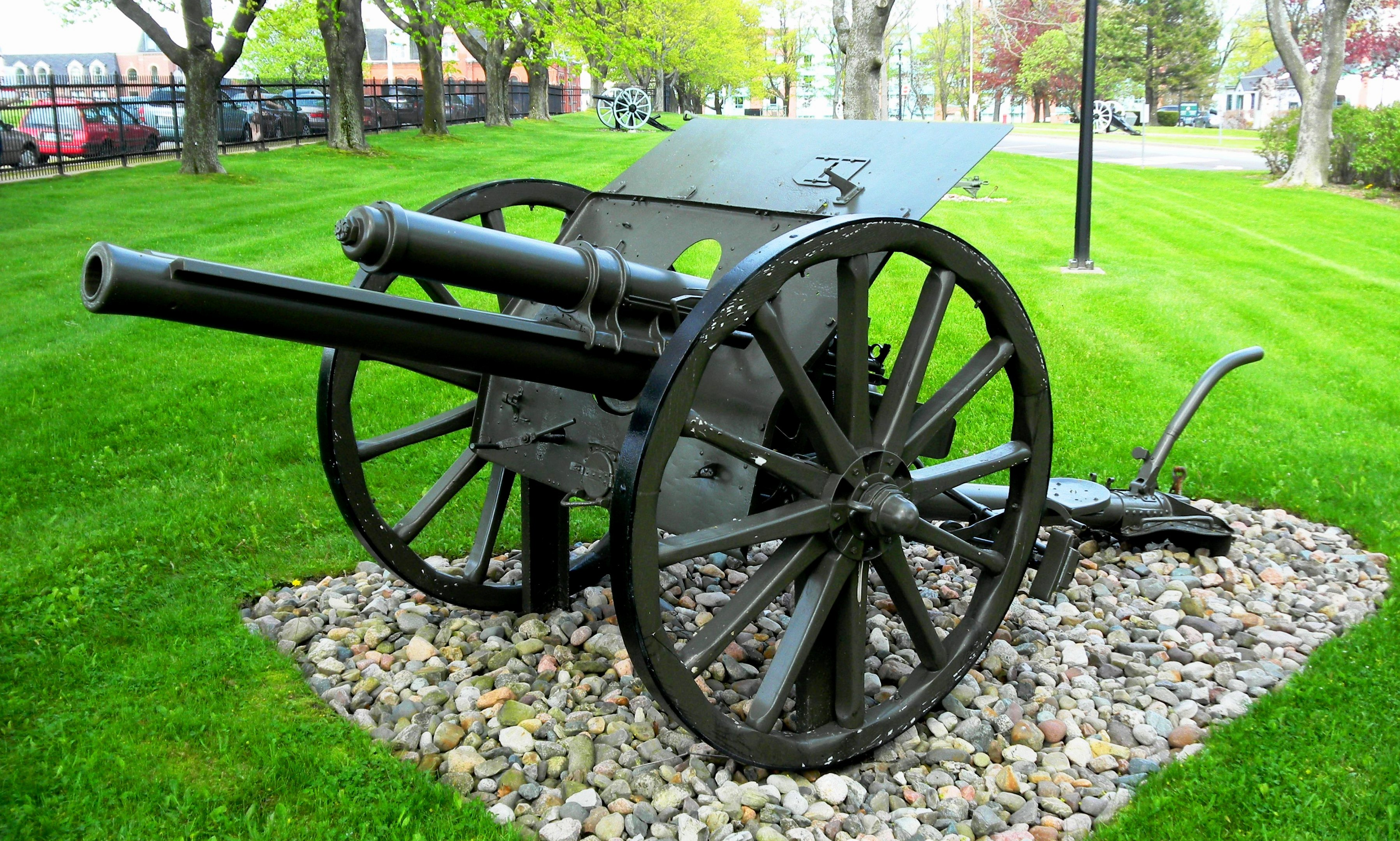
An Ordnance QF 18-pounder (produced 1903–1940) and other guns

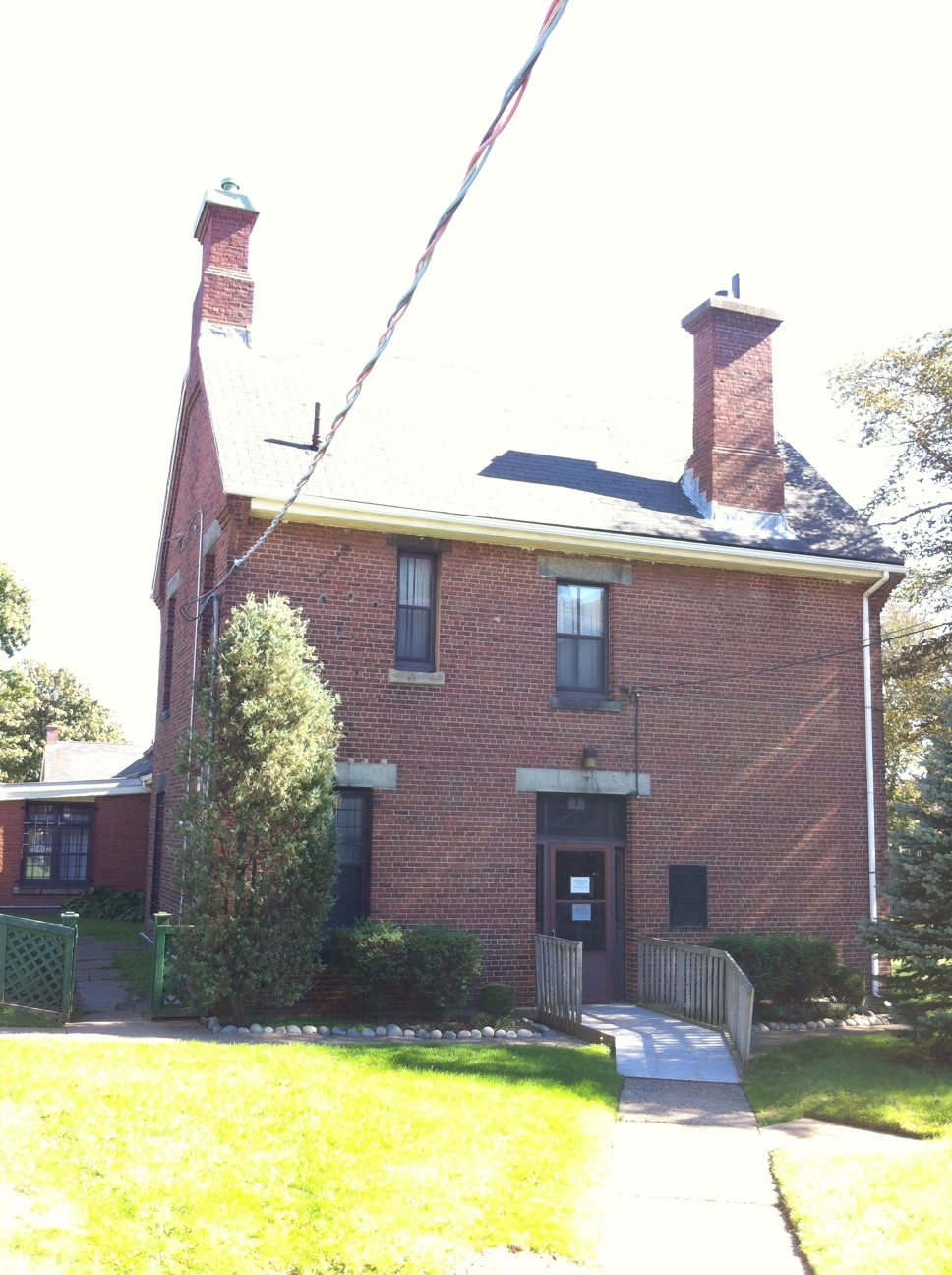
Cambridge Military Library (built 1886), Royal Artillery Park

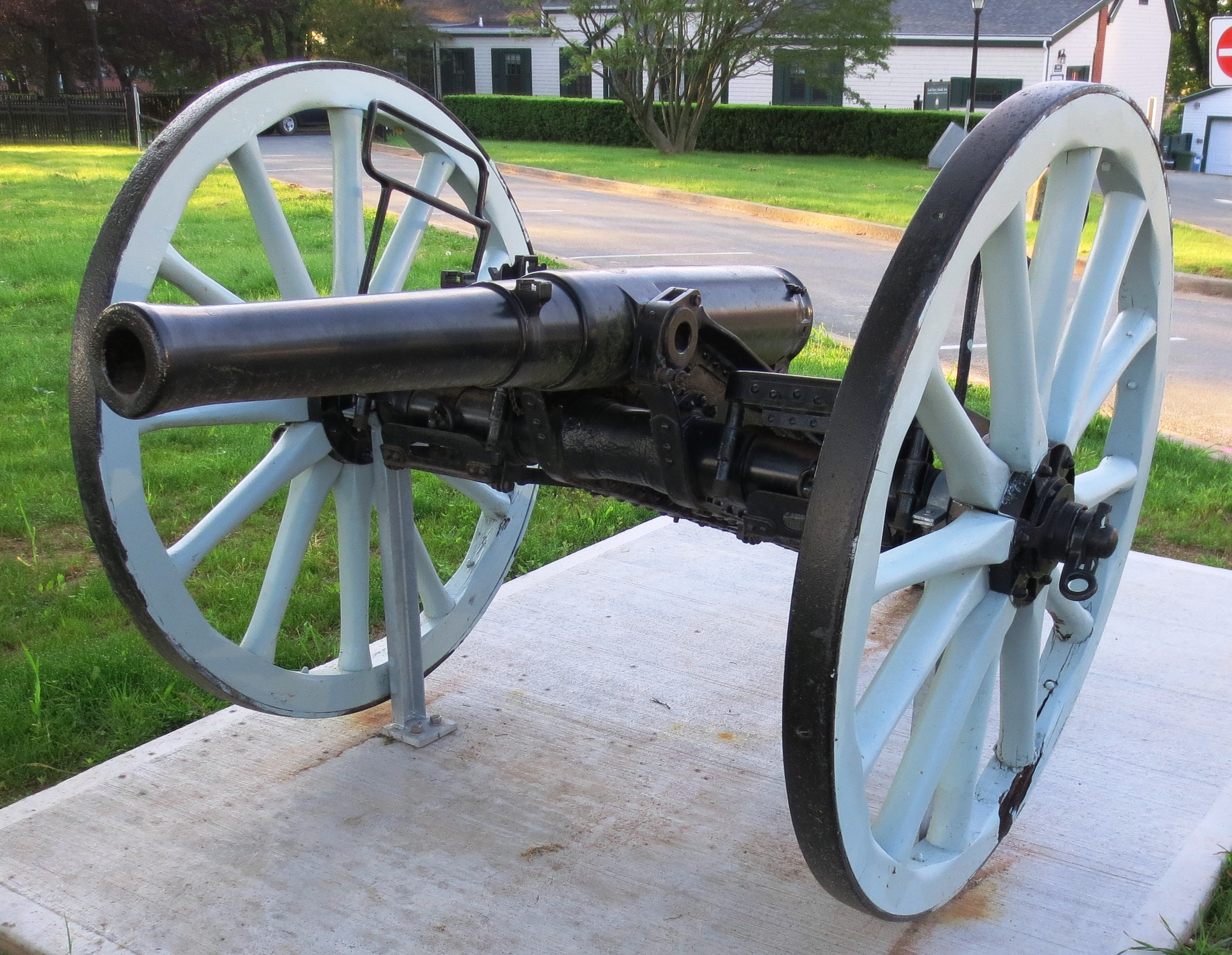
An Ordnance BL 12-pounder 6 cwt (produced (1894–1916)

== See also ==
- Military history of Nova Scotia
- List of oldest buildings and structures in Halifax, Nova Scotia

== Links ==
- History of Royal Artillery Park - Official site
