= Charitable Irish Society of Halifax =

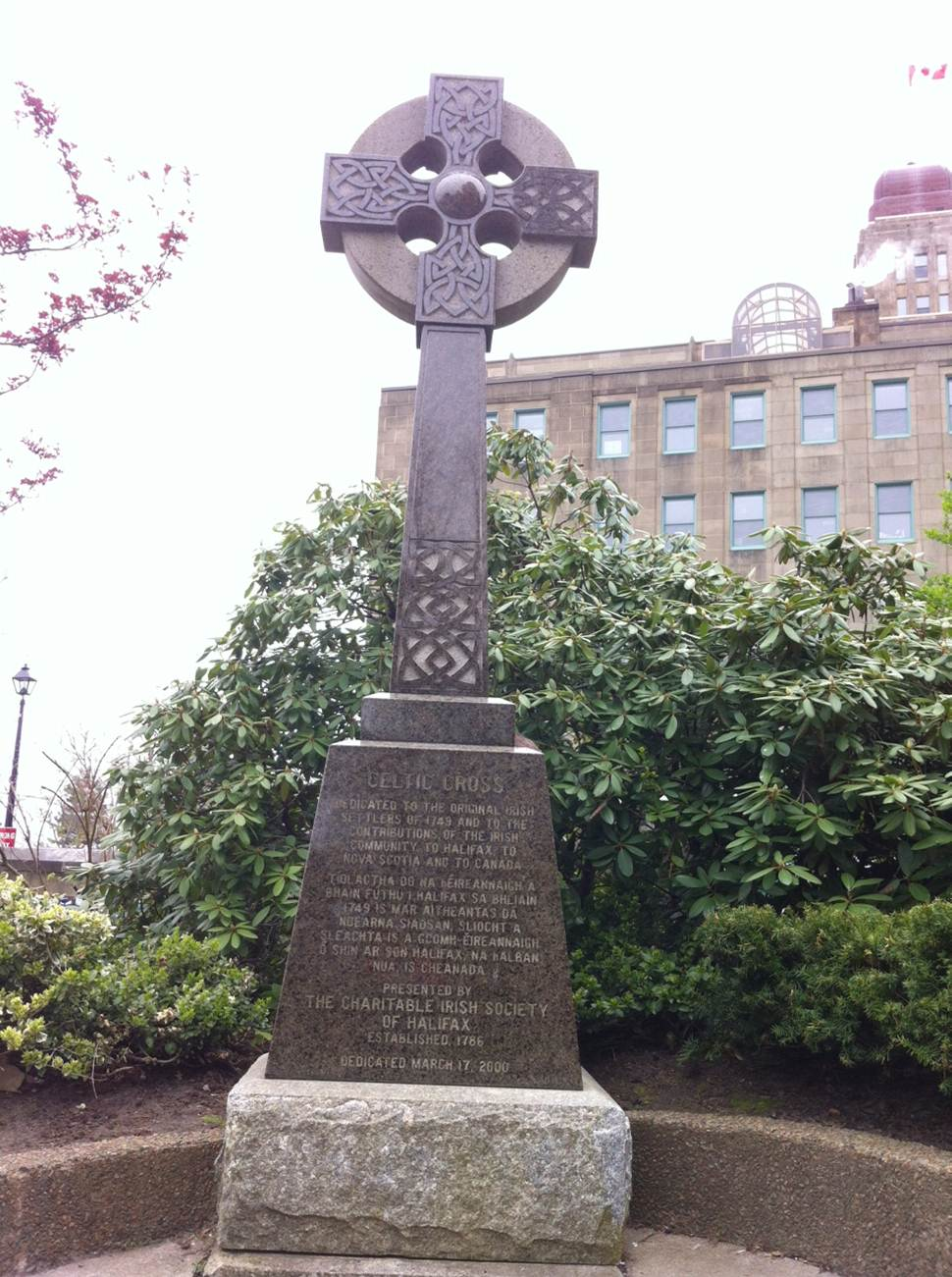
Charitable Irish Society Monument, Halifax, Nova Scotia

The Charitable Irish Society of Halifax is a historic society in Halifax, Nova Scotia which was established in 1786. The Society assists those on low-income and holds other charitable events. Many of the most prominent members of Nova Scotia have been members of the Society.

== Notable members ==
- Robert Field (painter)
- John Albro
- Richard Bulkeley
- Joseph Howe
- Edward Kenny
- John George Pyke - childhood survivor of the Raid on Dartmouth (1751)
- John Sparrow David Thompson - Prime Minister of Canada
- Richard John Uniacke

== See also ==
- Charitable Irish Society of Boston
- North British Society, Scots of Nova Scotia
