= CFS Churchill =

Canadian Forces station in Manitoba, Canada

- Location within Canada
- Coordinates: 58°43′30″N 94°07′00″W
- Country: Canada
- Province: Manitoba

Canadian Forces Station Churchill was a Canadian Forces station located at Churchill, Manitoba.

The ionospheric study station started in 1950 as HMC NRS Churchill, was renamed to HMCS CHURCHILL in 1956 and finally was renamed to CFS Churchill in 1966 as part of the Canadian Forces Supplementary Radio System.
