= CFS Val-d'Or =

Canadian Forces Station in Quebec

Canadian Forces Station Val d'Or (CFS Val d'Or) was a Canadian Forces Station in Val-d'Or, Quebec.

== RCAF Station Val d'Or ==
The Royal Canadian Air Force established RCAF Station Val d'Or in 1954 as a fighter-interceptor base intended to protect Montreal and the St. Lawrence River valley and Great Lakes basin against Soviet bomber aircraft. The airfield was topped with asphalt by the mid-1950s as RCAF Station Val d'Or became a key component in NORAD.

During the early 1960s, RCAF Station Val-d'Or was considered as the site for one of the Regional Emergency Government Headquarters (REGHQs), commonly known as a "Diefenbunker", but this facility was built at CFB Valcartier instead.

By 1964, the flying mission at RCAF Station Val-d'Or had changed to see all aircraft based at RCAF Station North Bay and RCAF Station Bagotville but were deployed to the base in rotations; in essence, RCAF Station Val-d'Or was now a forward operating base.

During the 1960s, RCAF Station Val-d'Or became home to numerous airborne nuclear weapons as RCAF CF-101 Voodoo interceptors were fitted with the AIR-2 Genie.

The rise of the FLQ terrorist group during this period saw the Canadian military devise strategies to safeguard nuclear ordnance primarily stored at RCAF Station Val-d'Or against being seized by the group's members.

== CFS Val-d'Or ==
The 1968 merger of the Canadian Army, RCAF and Royal Canadian Navy saw RCAF Station Val-d'Or renamed to Canadian Forces Station Val-d'Or or CFS Val-d'Or; the term station was used since Val-d'Or did not host any major units such as a wing or squadrons.

CFS Val-d'Or saw its mission gradually decrease during the 1970s and it was closed.
