= Highfield Park =

- Neighborhood
- Location within Nova Scotia
- Coordinates: 44°41′14.68″N 63°35′19.13″W
- Country: Canada
- Province: Nova Scotia
- Municipality: Halifax Regional Municipality
- Community: Dartmouth
- Community council: Harbour East - Marine Drive Community Council
- District: 6 - Harbourview - Burnside - Dartmouth East

Area
  - Total: 43 ha (110 acres)
- Postal code: B3A
- Area code: 902

Highfield Park is a neighbourhood located in the north end of the community of Dartmouth in Nova Scotia's Halifax Regional Municipality.

Highfield Park is located in the larger neighbourhood of Albro Lake (also a part of the North End) and is situated on the former site of the Royal Canadian Navy's Naval Radio Station Albro Lake. Following the merger of Canada's military to form the unified Canadian Forces in 1968, Naval Radio Station Albro Lake was closed and the land surrounding the lake was opened for development during the 1970s and 1980s.

Highfield Park is situated at the northern extremity of Dartmouth, immediately south of Highway 111, which separates the neighbourhood from an industrial park in Burnside further to the north. The eastern side of Highfield Park is defined by the neighbourhood of Crystal Heights (as well as Highway 111 as it curves around Albro Lake). Victoria Road defines the southern boundary of the neighbourhood.

== Transportation ==
Highfield Park is home to the Highfield Terminal, a transit station run by Halifax Transit served by six bus routes.

There are direct buses to Halifax Shopping Centre (route 3), Downtown Dartmouth (route 53), Dartmouth Crossing (route 72), Burnside Industrial Park (routes 3, 64, 72), Clayton Park (route 39), Mic Mac Mall (route 72), and various other destinations.
