= CFB Halifax =

Naval base in Halifax, Nova Scotia, Canada

Canadian Forces Base Halifax
- Halifax, Nova Scotia in Canada
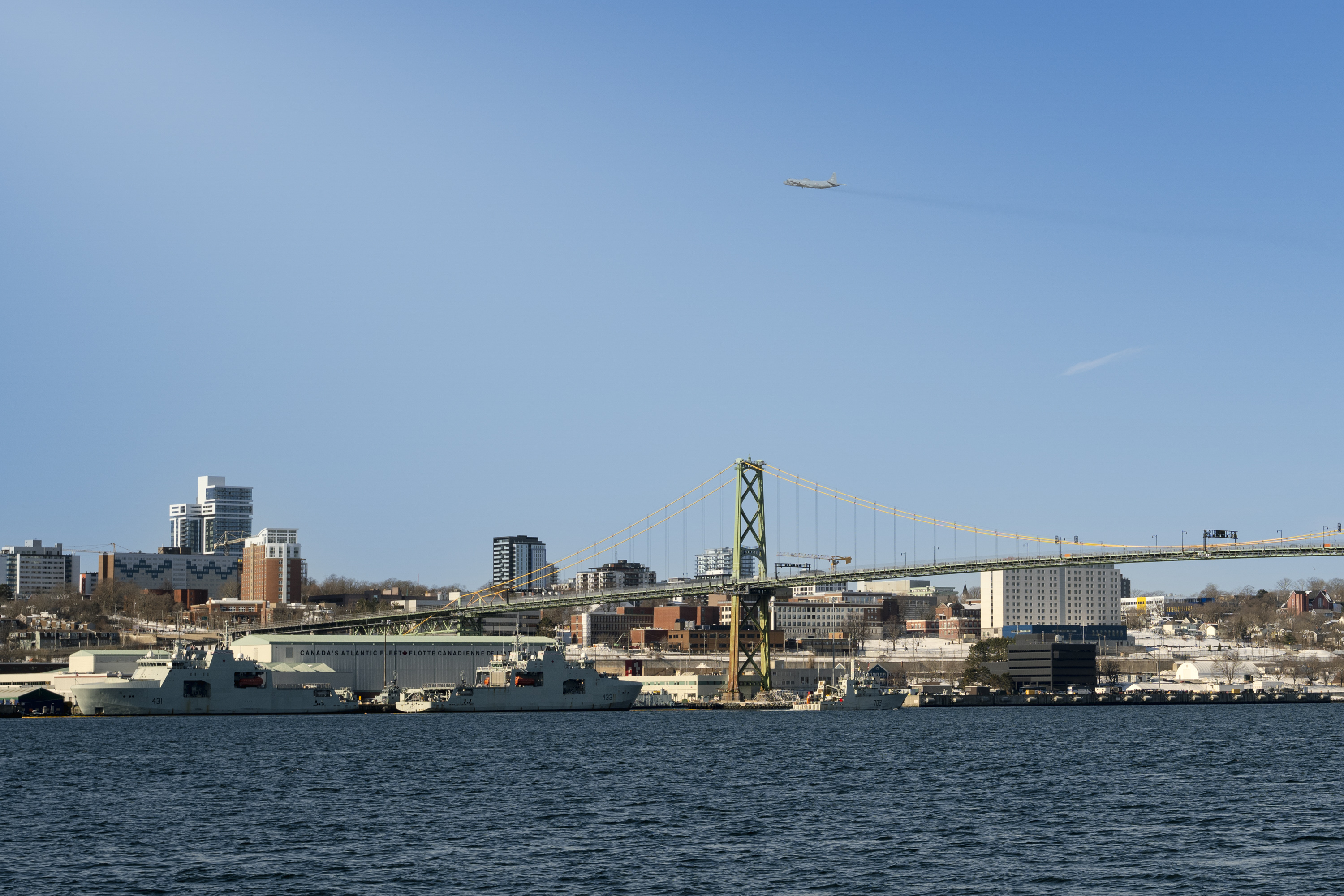

Site information
- Owner: Department of National Defence
- Operator: Royal Canadian Navy
- Controlled by: Maritime Forces Atlantic
- Website: http://www.navy-marine.forces.gc.ca/en/about/structure-marlant-units.page

Location
- Coordinates: 44°39′23.63″N 63°34′44.69″W

Garrison information
- Current commander: Captain(N) Annick Fortin

Canadian Forces Base (CFB) Halifax is Canada's east coast naval base and home port to the Royal Canadian Navy Atlantic fleet, known as Canadian Fleet Atlantic (CANFLTLANT), that forms part of the formation Maritime Forces Atlantic (MARLANT).

It is the largest Canadian Forces Base in terms of the number of posted personnel and is formed from an amalgamation of military properties situated around the strategic Halifax Harbour in Nova Scotia.

== His Majesty's Canadian Dockyard (HMC Dockyard Halifax) ==
=== History ===
HMC Dockyard Halifax was acquired by the Canadian government from the Royal Navy following the withdrawal of British military forces from Canada in 1906. Prior to 1906, it was known as Royal Naval Dockyard, Halifax and is one of the oldest defence establishments in Canada, having been established by the Royal Navy during the 18th century as HM Dockyard. While awaiting transfer to Canada, the dockyard fell into disrepair. The dockyard was formally taken over from the British government by Canada in 1910, with no changes to the layout. The dockyard in 1910 comprised a naval hospital, a blacksmith shop, workshops, three slipways, five jetties, residences, coal and victualling stores and 75 other miscellaneous buildings.

During World War I, the dockyard underwent significant expansion, acting as headquarters for the Royal Canadian Navy and as the North American headquarters for the Royal Navy. During the 1917 Halifax Explosion, the dockyard was severely damaged, with many of its buildings demolished. New ones were swiftly erected for the war effort. However, following the end of the war in 1918, the number of dockyard staff was reduced significantly.

In 1939, the dockyards were extended to the north and south. With the onset of World War II, this was still not large enough and the lands of the French Cable Company in Dartmouth, Nova Scotia were acquired and integrated into the base. In 1942, the Royal Canadian Navy acquired the Army Ordnance Depot in Dartmouth and an area on the east side of Bedford Basin was turned into an ammunition depot. During the war, new construction replaced nearly every building that had existed prior to the war. HMC Dockyard encompassed 508 hectares (1,255 acres) after all the acquisitions. In 1943, the dockyard's lands were augmented with property in Renous, New Brunswick and another ammunition depot at Newcastle, New Brunswick. The Army Gun Wharf in Halifax became the victualling depot and two communications stations were established, one at Albro and one at Newport Corners. The barracks building that became HMCS Scotian was erected during the war.

In 1948, the Maritime Museum of the Atlantic was established on the premises of the dockyard. In the 1950s, an Underwater Training Unit, the School of ABCD Warfare and the Damage Control School were under the administration of HMCS Stadacona and operated out of dockyard facilities. The dockyard maintained a 35-ton lift crane on Jetty 3, a 45-ton lift crane on Jetty 4 and a 50-ton lift crane on the Gun Wharf. In 1953, a seaward defence base was constructed between Pier "B" and the yacht anchorage in the south end of Halifax.

=== Current status ===
HMC Dockyard Halifax is located on the western side of Halifax Harbour at the southern end of The Narrows. It hosts the headquarters of Maritime Forces Atlantic (MARLANT), the formal name for the Atlantic Fleet. HMC Dockyard Halifax contains berths for Canadian and foreign warships, Formation Supply Facility, Fleet Maintenance Facility Cape Scott, shore-based training facilities as well as operations buildings for MARLANT and other organizations such as Joint Rescue Coordination Centre Halifax (JRCC Halifax).

HMC Dockyard Halifax also has an adjunct facility directly across the harbour on the Dartmouth shoreline with jetties and various buildings, including Defence Research and Development Canada – Atlantic.

HMC Dockyard Halifax maintains exclusive control of several anchorage areas within the limits of Halifax Harbour and prevents civilian vessels from sailing in the vicinity of military facilities; a floating force protection boom system was constructed to prevent small vessels from unauthorized passage near warships and pierside facilities.

The original Naval Yard clock has been restored and moved to the Halifax Ferry Terminal entrance while the original Naval Yard bell is preserved at the Maritime Museum of the Atlantic in Halifax, a museum which also features a large diorama depicting the Naval Yard in 1813 at its height in the Age of Sail. The dockyard was designated a National Historic Site of Canada in 1923, while Admiralty House was designated a National Historic Site in 1978.

== Stadacona ==
Stadacona, referred to as HMCS Stadacona before 1968 and frequently referred to as "Stad", is an adjunct to HMC Dockyard located west of the waterfront in the North End of the Halifax peninsula. Prior to the arrival of the French, the location that would become Quebec was the home of a small Iroquois village called "Stadacona", after which the base is named. Stadacona contains the Canadian Forces Naval Engineering School (with facilities at Herring Cove/York Redoubt, south of Halifax), the Canadian Forces Naval Operations School, the base hospital, the Canadian Forces Maritime Warfare Centre, and various messes. Stadacona is also home to the headquarters of 5th Canadian Division and the Maritime Command Museum.

Stadacona was built as the British Army's Wellington Barracks, later known as the Nelson Barracks, as part of the Halifax Defence Complex. The British military forces departed from Canada in 1906. During World War II, the Royal Canadian Navy appropriated the site from the army and it was transformed into HMCS Stadacona.

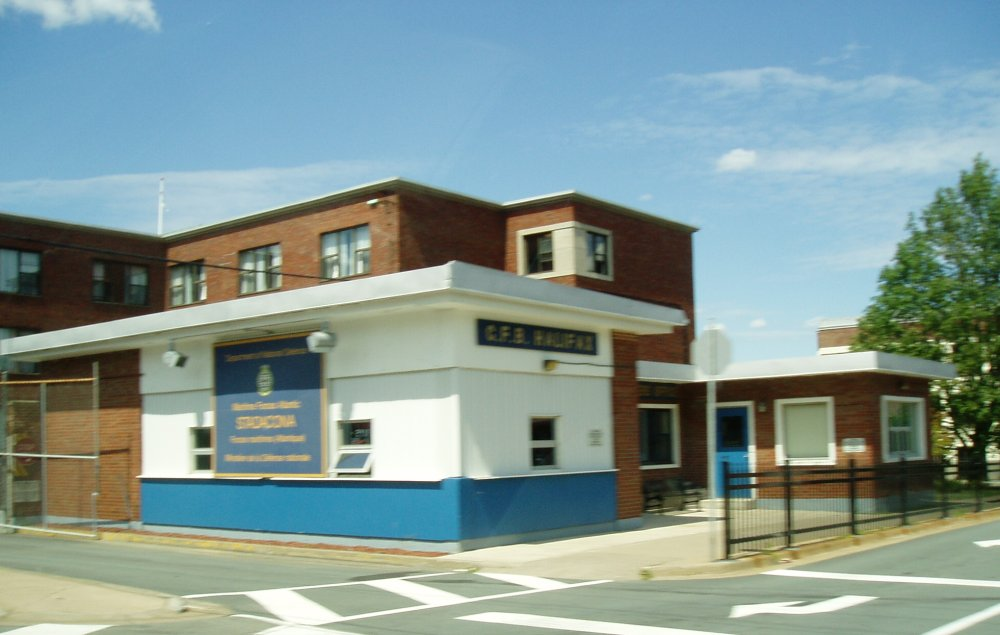
Stadacona Entrance. Building demolished in March 2013.

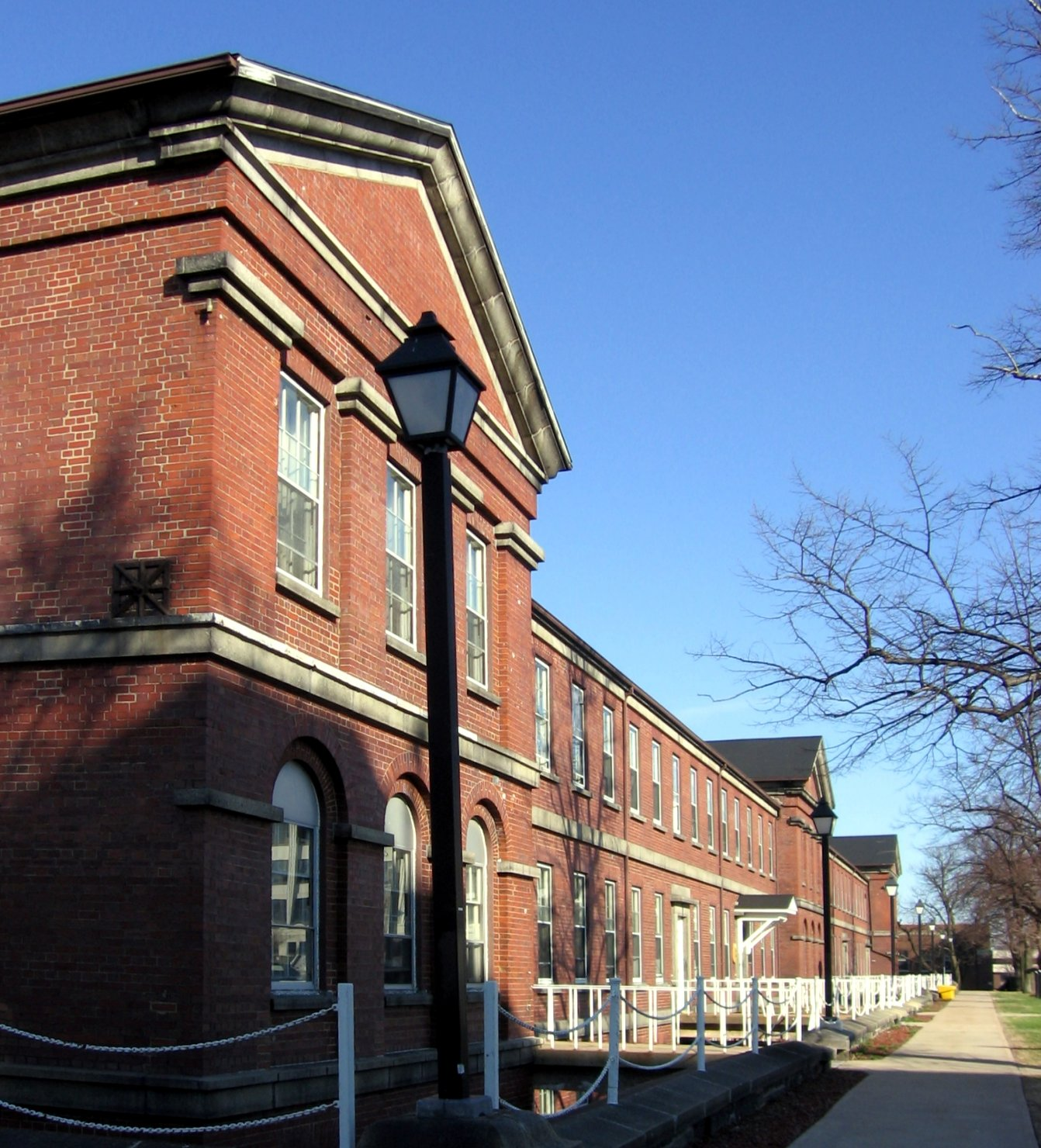
Wellington Barracks

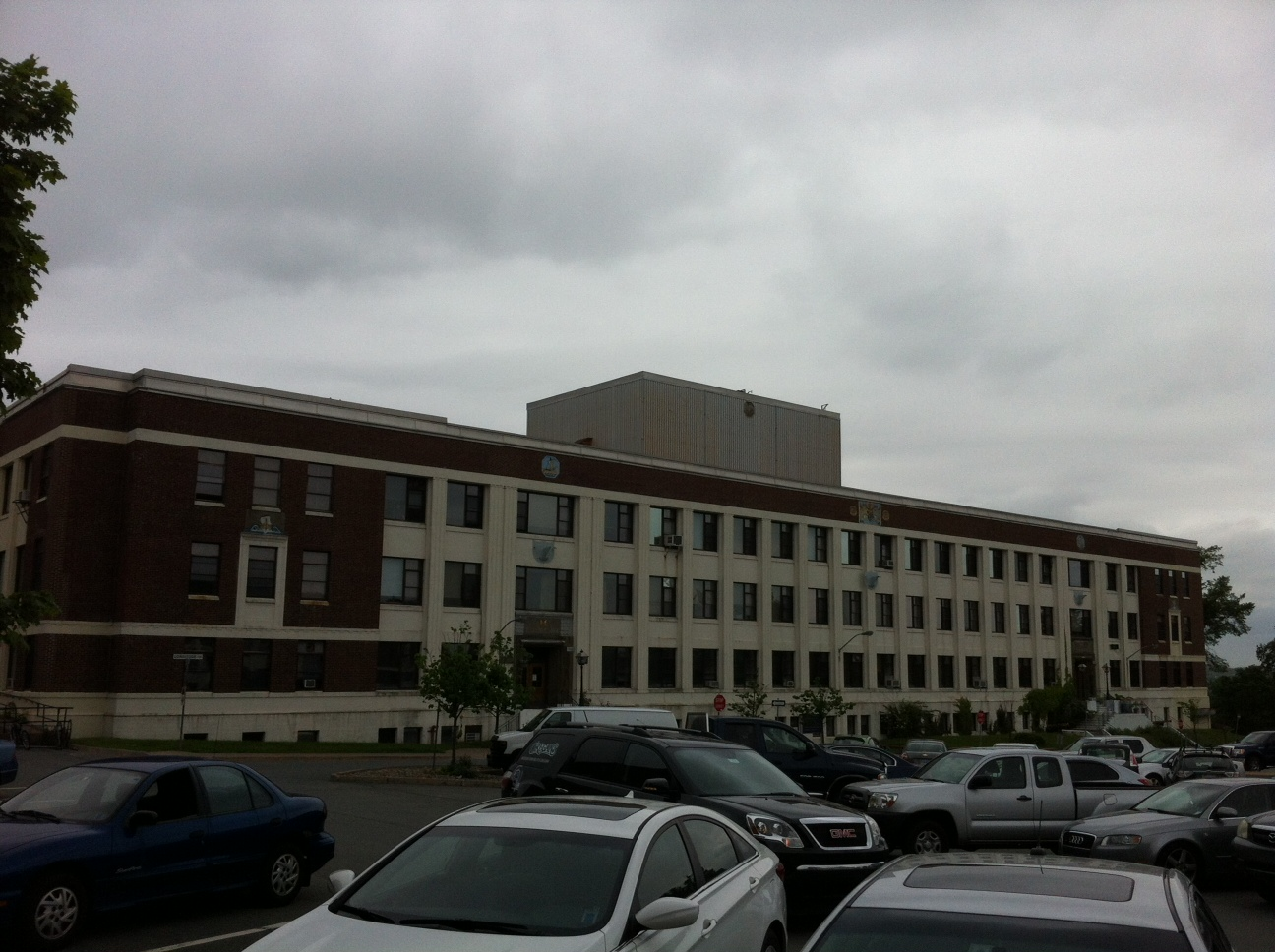
Leonard W. Murray (Naval Fleet School (Atlantic)) Building, CFB Halifax

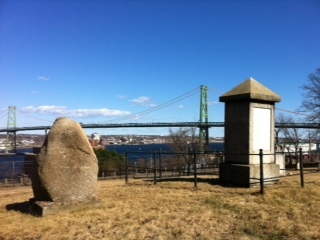
Gravestones for casualties of HMS Shannon's Capture of USS Chesapeake, Royal Navy Burying Ground

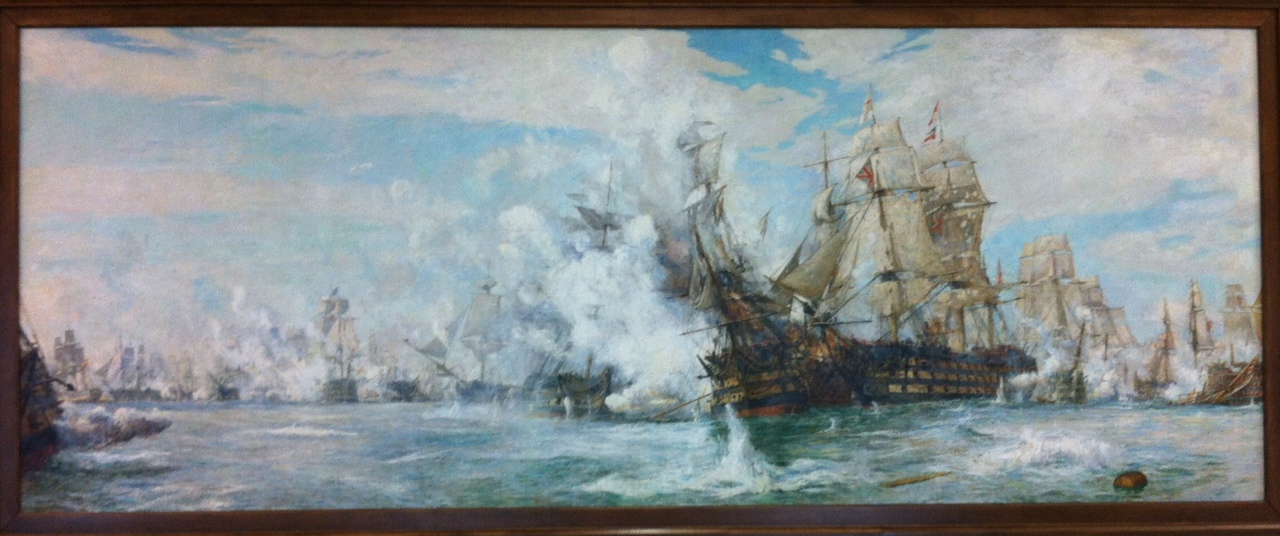
Battle of Trafalgar mural by William Lionel Wyllie, Juno Tower

=== Historic structures ===
==== Admiralty's Residence ====
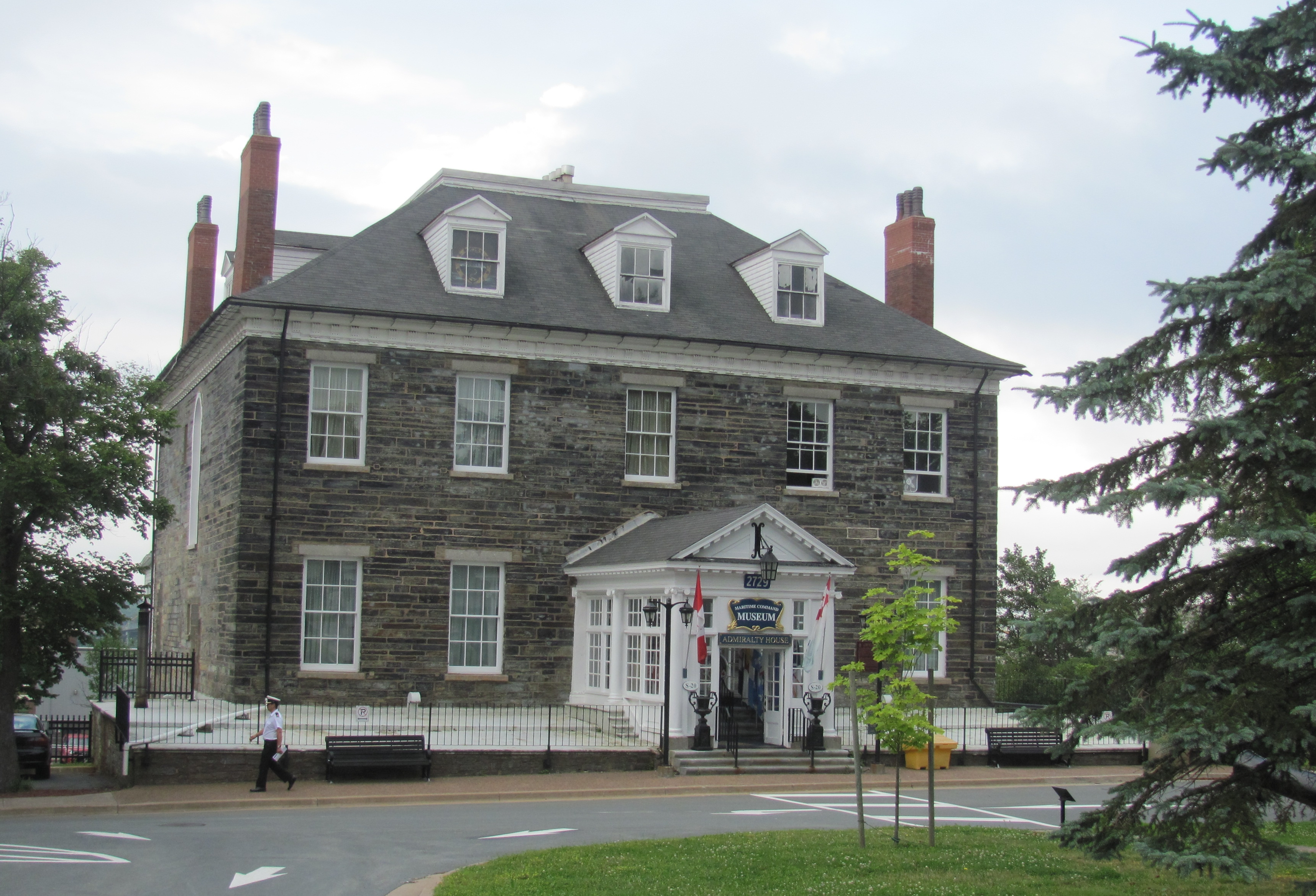
Admiralty House, Halifax (1819)

Almost all the original Royal Navy 18th- and 19th-century buildings were demolished in World War II to make way for machine shops, stores buildings and drill halls needed to man and maintain the hundreds of corvettes being commissioned during the crash expansion of the Royal Canadian Navy during the Battle of the Atlantic. Only one residence from 1814 and the Admiral's Residence from 1819 survived. The Admiral's residence (Admiralty House) is now the Naval Museum of Halifax.

==== Wellington Barracks ====
Wellington Barracks, also known as Wellington House, is located next to the former parade square within CFB Halifax. It was constructed by the Royal Engineers between 1852 and 1860 and is of neoclassical design.

==== Wellington Gate ====
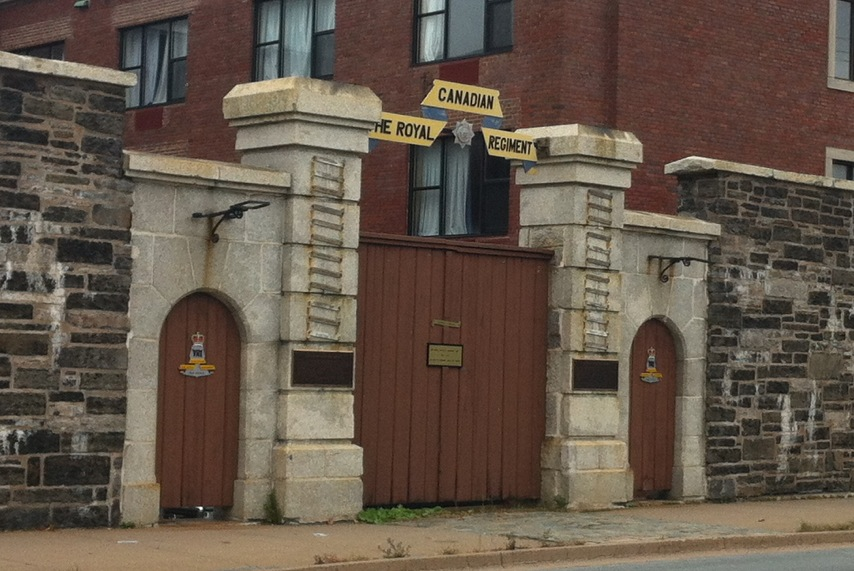
Wellington Gate, Göttingen Street (1850)

Wellington Gate was created in 1850 and named after Arthur Wellesley, 1st Duke of Wellington. The gate is lined on either side with two columns listing the battle honours of the Royal Canadian Regiment, which was stationed at Wellington Barracks for several years.

==== Admiralty Garden ====
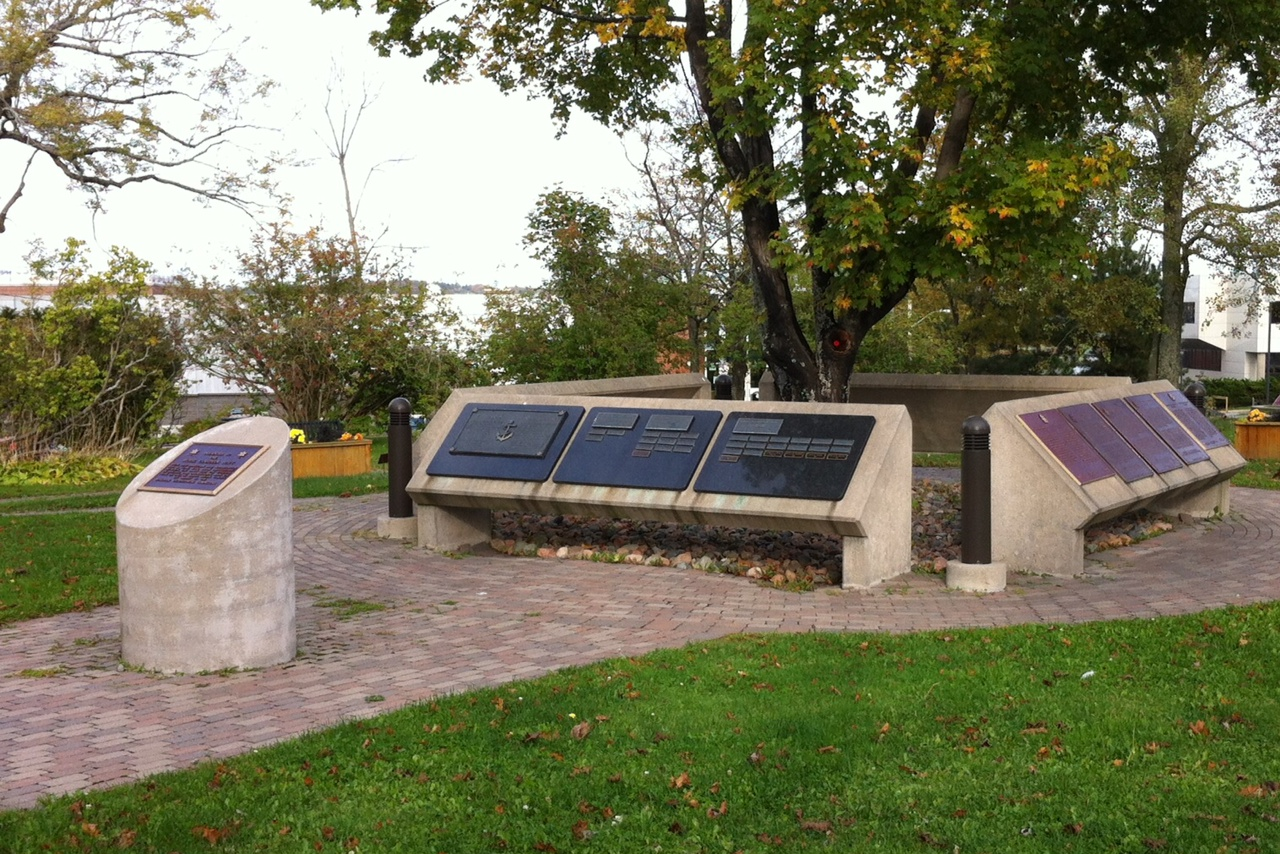
Admiralty Garden CFB Halifax

The Admiralty Garden was created c. 1814 and has plaques and monuments displayed to honour persons and mark events, significant to Halifax's naval history. In 1972 the "Wall of Valour" was created to recognize the bravery decorations awarded to regular and reserve members of the Royal Canadian Navy.

There are a series plaques of Historic Sites and Monuments Board of Canada.

==== Faith Centre ====
The Faith Centre has numerous plaques and stained glass windows that are dedicated to naval personnel who died in service aboard Canadian warships.

==== Royal Navy Burying Ground ====
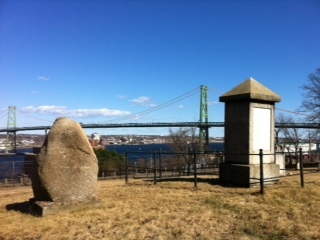
Royal Navy Burial Ground – Gravestones for the casualties of the USS Chesapeake (left) and HMS Shannon (right), CFB Halifax, Halifax, Nova Scotia

The Royal Navy Burying Ground at Halifax has monuments to those served and lost in the medical facility as a result of capture of USS Chesapeake by HMS Shannon. There are 84 grave markers, but as many as 500 people buried.

== Shearwater Heliport ==
Shearwater Heliport is an airfield located on the eastern shore of Halifax Harbour in the community of Eastern Passage that supports CH-148 Cyclone helicopters used on the RCN's warships based at CFB Halifax.

Formerly a separate base known as CFB Shearwater, the airfield was realigned as part of CFB Halifax during the mid-1990s. 12 Wing, a Royal Canadian Air Force unit that reports to 1 Canadian Air Division, is the primary user of Shearwater Heliport and is headquartered there. DND properties that were formerly aligned to CFB Shearwater, such as the Hartlen Point Golf Course and the Shearwater Jetty, are now part of CFB Halifax.

12 Wing operates from two locations with four squadrons:

- Shearwater Heliport
  - 406 Maritime Operational Training Squadron is an operational training squadron for training all maritime helicopter aircrew in the Canadian Forces.
  - 423 Maritime Helicopter Squadron is an operational squadron at Shearwater Heliport which provides CH-148 Cyclone helicopters for Maritime Forces Atlantic warships.
  - 12 Air Maintenance Squadron provides aircraft maintenance and engineering support to 12 Wing's operational squadrons.
  - Helicopter Operational Evaluation and Test Facility (HOTEF) is responsible for researching and testing state-of-the-art equipment for the CH-148 Cyclone to enable crews to operate efficiently, ashore or while deployed.
- Patricia Bay Heliport
  - 443 Maritime Helicopter Squadron is an operational squadron which provides CH-148 Cyclone helicopters for Maritime Forces Pacific warships.

== Royal Artillery Park ==
Royal Artillery Park is a military park, which is part of CFB Halifax. In the far corner of the Royal Artillery Park, is a diminutive red brick building, the Cambridge Military Library. This building was the social and literary centre of military Halifax. The Library opened in 1817 at Grafton Street, as an alternative to the more notorious choices of city entertainment. It moved to its present location in Royal Artillery Park in 1886 and was renamed Cambridge Military Library in 1902. The library was funded in part from Customs receipts collected by the British Army during its occupation of the port of Castine, Maine, during the War of 1812.

== CFAD Bedford ==
The Canadian Forces Ammunition Depot Bedford, informally referred to as the "Bedford Magazine", is a major Canadian Forces property occupying the entire northern shore of Bedford Basin. It houses all of the ordnance for MARLANT vessels and has a loading jetty and several nearby anchorages.

== HMCS Trinity ==
HMCS Trinity is the organization housed at Stadacona which is tasked with maintaining MARLANT communications with vessels and other Canadian Forces and allied units, as well as developing strategic and tactical operational intelligence for unit commanders.

HMCS Trinity operates two remote radio transmitter/receiver stations near Halifax:

- Naval Radio Station Newport Corner
- Naval Radio Station Mill Cove

== Windsor Park ==
Windsor Park contains the Military Police Unit (Halifax), Health Promotion Services (PSP), Integrated Personnel Service Centre (IPSC), the Military Family Resource Centre, the Stadacona Band, CFB Halifax Curling Club, 3 Intelligence Company Headquarters as well as the Canex.

== Housing ==
Housing for CFB Halifax is provided to Canadian Forces personnel and their dependants at Windsor Park, a housing area built by the Department of National Defence in the West End of Halifax. Stadacona is home to Tribute Tower, a barracks for JR Ranks members. Base housing also used to be provided at Shannon Park and Wallis Heights in the North End of Dartmouth, however with defence cutbacks in the 1990s, this area has been sold for civilian use. Housing is available at the 12 Wing Shearwater site, which is part of CFB Halifax. A large number of service personnel own or rent civilian property in the area.

== CFB Halifax Emergency Services ==
The base is equipped with their own fire and rescue service with mostly land based vehicles. Royal Canadian Navy ships are also equipped to fight fires including tugs with the auxiliary branch. The City of Halifax's Halifax Regional Fire and Emergency can provide additional marine fire support if needed.

== Commemorations and monuments ==
- Wallis Heights, Nova Scotia, and Provo Wallis St. is named after Nova Scotian Provo Wallis
- Stadacona is the indigenous name for Quebec City
- Monuments in the graveyard to HMS Shannon and USS Chesapeake
- Wellington Barracks named after Arthur Wellesley, 1st Duke of Wellington, renamed Nelson Barracks named after Horatio Nelson
- Shannon Park is named after HMS Shannon
- the Murray Building (Naval Fleet School(Atlantic)) is named after Admiral Leonard W. Murray
- the Carroll Building (Naval Fleet School(Atlantic)) is named after Lieutenant-Commander George Alvin Carroll (1921– 1963), born Stockton, Manitoba, Distinguished Service Medal
- Lady Nelson Road is named after HMCS Lady Nelson that was hit by U-161

== See also ==
- Royal Naval Dockyard, Halifax
- Military history of Nova Scotia
- History of the Royal Canadian Navy
