= Goldie & McCulloch =

Canadian steam engine manufacturer

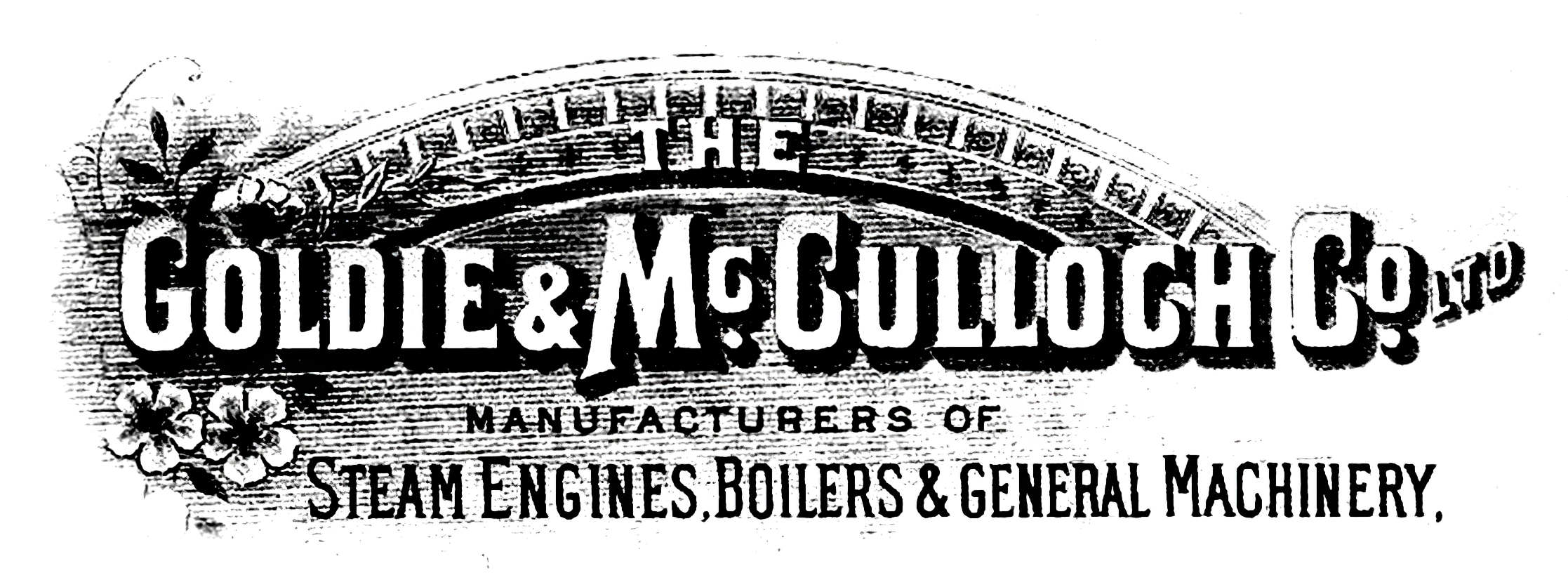

- The Goldie & McCulloch foundry c. 1897
- Industry: Engineering
- Founded: 1859; 167 years ago
- Founders: John Goldie and Hugh McCulloch
- Fate: Acquired by Babcock & Wilcox in 1923; 103 years ago
- Successor: Babcock-Wilcox & Goldie-McCulloch Ltd.
- Headquarters: Galt, Ontario, Canada
- Products: Stationary steam engines, Boilers, Woodworking machinery, Industrial Safes, French Burr millstones, Tannery Machines

The Goldie & McCulloch Company Ltd. was a Canadian steam engine manufacturer based in Galt, Ontario. The company also manufactured woodworking machinery, industrial safes, French Burr millstones, boilers, turbine water wheels, bark mills and a variety of tannery machines. They primarily supplied the Canadian market, but the company had a strong export business to Mexico and South America.

== History ==
=== The Dumfries Foundry ===
The company was founded in Galt as the Dumfries Foundry in 1844 by James Andrews and James Crombie. The exact number of products manufactured by the foundry during this period is unclear, however it is known that apart from steam engines the company also produced safe doors.

In 1850 Andrews was experiencing financial troubles and Crombie took over the business, renaming it to Crombie & Co.

During the Crimean War in 1854 Crombie's business thrived as Great Britain focused its efforts on manufacturing war materials which forced Canada to depend more on domestic production. This created an economic boom in Galt and led to a great increase of employees. It was also around this time that the Great Western Railway built a branch line in Galt, which made it easier for Crombie to export the heavy equipment that was being manufactured by the company.

In 1859 Crombie sold the company to John Goldie and Hugh McCulloch, two of his employees, for $50,000 and it was subsequently renamed Goldie McCulloch & Co. It is said that Crombie expected the pair's business venture to fail and intended to buy the company back from them for a fraction of the price they paid. The two had great success however and over the next sixty years Goldie McCulloch & Co. grew into a major manufacturing company with a broad line of products.

=== The Goldie & McCulloch Company Ltd. ===
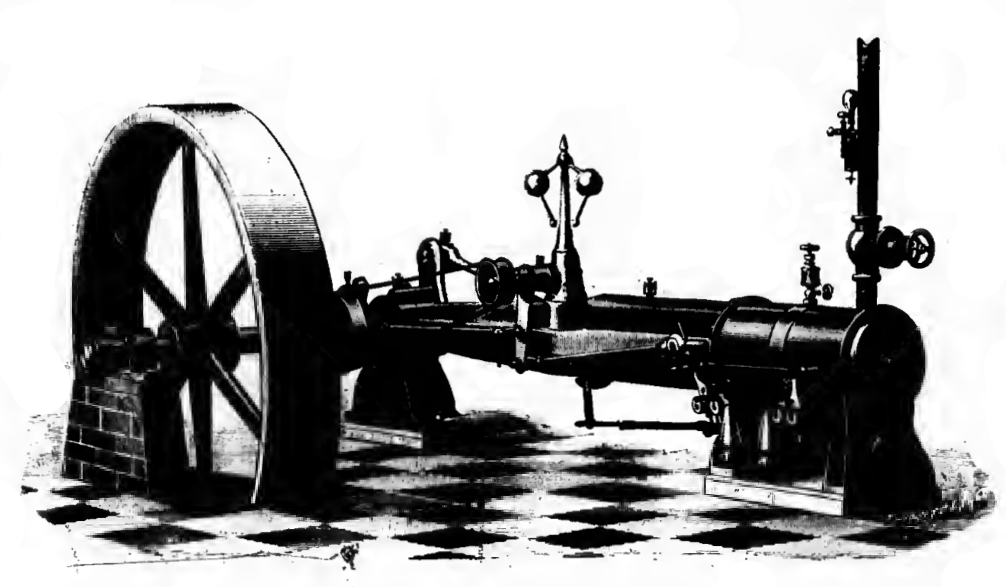
Patented Wheelock Engine manufactured by Goldie & McCulloch

Goldie McCulloch & Co. received its first major contract for machinery in 1862 from the Great Western Railway's rolling mills in Hamilton.

In 1867 the company had greatly expanded its production to include Water Wheels, Flax Mills, Tannery Machines and Boilers, among others. It was also in this year that Stephen Wilcox and George Babcock founded Babcock & Wilcox, which would play a major role in the company's future.

Near the end of the 1860s, Goldie McCulloch & Co. began manufacturing hopper cars for the Credit Valley Railway. This increase in business must have put a great strain on the old foundry buildings that were still being used by the company. In 1870, extensive additions and improvements were made to the buildings. A large plot of land adjacent to the foundry was also purchased by the company in March of that same year with the intentions of constructing a new building.

The building which was to be constructed was described by The Galt Reporter as "A range of shops for blacksmiths, boilermakers, millstone builders with a large store-house attached; also a stone store-house 84 square feet, three stories high, to be built on a lot opposite the Foundry...". The building, which was used for the remainder of the company's lifespan, is still standing today and has since been restored and converted into a mall.

The year 1873 saw another expansion at the foundry. The old tannery property next door was bought, the buildings were gutted, and a 60-horsepower steam engine was installed in the rebuilt structure.

By 1880 safes and vaults had become an important part of the firm's exports and a decision was made to expand that line of products. Property was bought in 1882 for a vault machine shop and a moulding shop, another lot was also acquired in 1883 for further expansion. This was also the year that the company obtained the Canadian patent to the Wheelock engine. This would become one of Goldie McCulloch's & Co.'s defining products, with at least a few engines remaining in operation more than 100 years later.

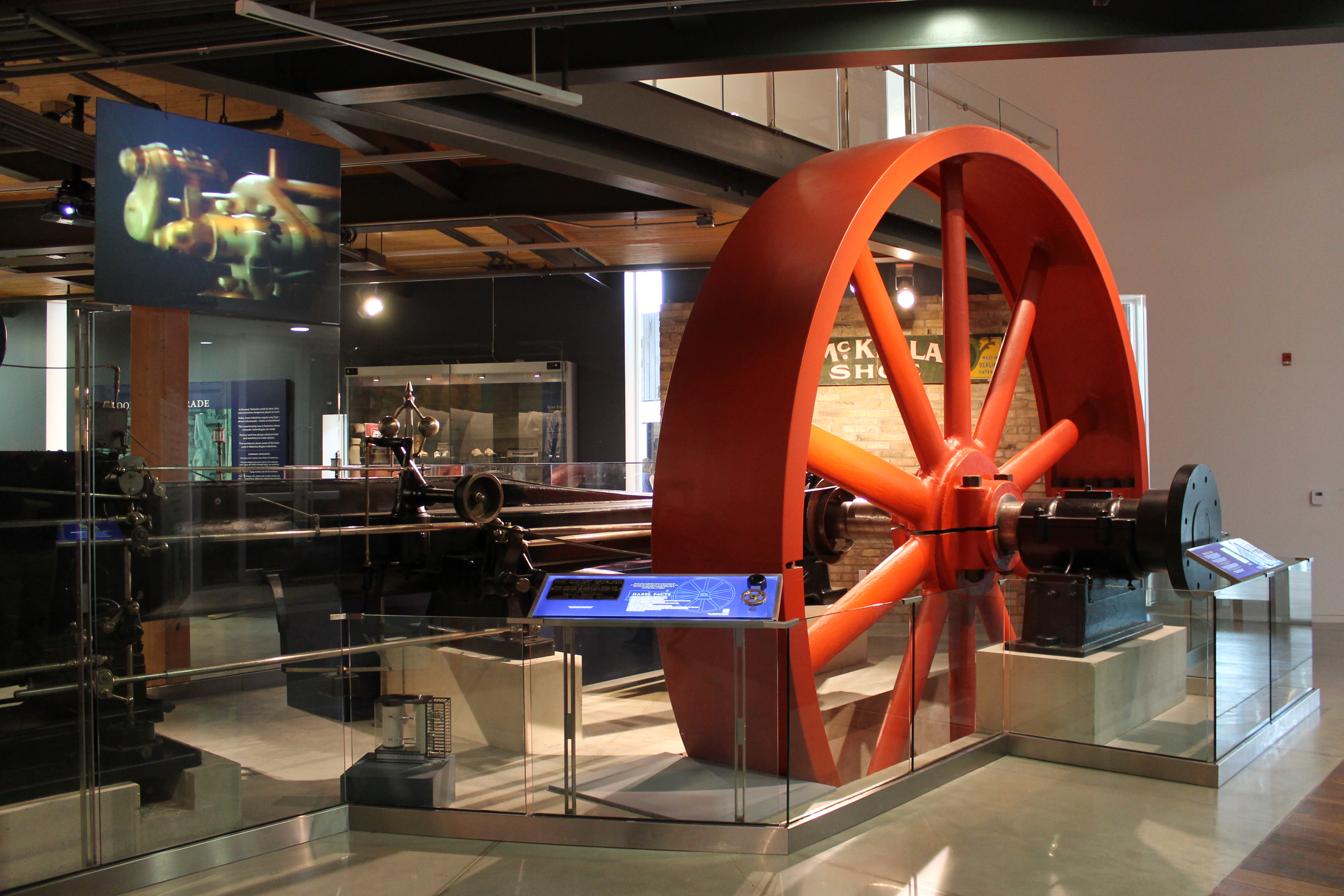
Steam engine built in 1908 by Goldie & McCulloch Co. Ltd.

In June 1886, Goldie McCulloch & Co. was again undertaking construction. The old sawmill across from the foundry was torn down and replaced by a stone building 140 x 64 feet and two stories high.

On April 21, 1891, the company incorporated and became The Goldie & McCulloch Company Limited.

In 1902 the company employed around 450 people, a substantial amount more than the 22 workers it had when it was bought from Crombie. In 1910 the company sold their woodworking division to MacGregor, Gourlay Co. which used it, as well as several other companies, to form Canada Machinery Corp., Ltd.

As the company expanded, it began to supply equipment to some famous Canadian landmarks. In 1922, the company supplied three Type D Cross Drum Sectional Water Tube Boilers to the Chateau Frontenac in Quebec City.

=== Babcock-Wilcox & Goldie-McCulloch Ltd. ===
By 1922 both the Goldie and McCulloch families still held a majority of the company's assets, however this would change the following year. In 1923 the company was purchased by Babcock, Wilcox & Co. which used it to form Babcock-Wilcox & Goldie-McCulloch Limited, the Canadian division of Babcock & Wilcox. In 1968 the name was changed to Babcox & Wilcox Canada Ltd.. The company continued to manufacture steam engines in Galt under the Babcock & Wilcox name until 1987.
