= RCAF Station Flin Flon =

Royal Canadian Air Force (RCAF) Station Flin Flon is located near the town of Flin Flon, Manitoba, Canada. Used mostly for signals intelligence (SIGINT) this facility was established during World War II around1941 with SIGINT activities beginning 1959. High-frequency direction finding and wireless interception operations supporting allied efforts against German U-Boats, the station held operations as part of Cold War-era defense efforts until is closure in 1973.

The station operated underground seismic detectors and electro-magnetic wave detector direction finder equipment to support Canada's contribution to the Atomic Energy Detection System (AEDS).
