= CFS Gloucester =

- Location within Canada
- Coordinates: 45°18′04″N 75°31′09″W
- Country: Canada
- Territory: Ontario

Canadian Forces Station Gloucester was a wireless HFDF intercept station near Ottawa, Ontario.

The site opened as Number 1 Station HMCS Bytown (1943), with name changes to HMC NRS Gloucester (1950), HMCS Gloucester (1950), and finally CFS Gloucester (1966) till the closure in 1972.

The station had the nickname No 1 and was the site for SigInt training in Canada till closure had the school move to CFB Kingston for its new home at the Canadian Forces School of Communications and Electronics (CFSCE), Echo Squadron.

One role of the station during the war years was the radio location of German U-boats in the North Atlantic. Until the Unification of the Canadian Armed Forces in 1968, the unit often provided ceremonial platoons at public events in Ottawa while representing the RCN.

The motto was Knowledge through Discipline.
