= CFS Cobourg =

Military logistics base in Ontario, Canada

Coordinates: 43.974°N 78.164°W

Canadian Forces Station Cobourg (also CFS Cobourg) was a military logistics base located in Cobourg, Ontario.

The facility was created due to the expansion of Canadian military capability brought about by the Korean War and Cold War. Logistics and supply facilities for the Army were being expanded across Canada, and Cobourg was chosen as a site for a new supply depot. The choice of Cobourg for a location was partly due to its proximity to major rail lines. Land was purchased in 1951 and construction proceeded on several buildings over the next two years. In 1954, the headquarters of No. 26 Ordnance Depot of the Royal Canadian Ordnance Corps was relocated from Ottawa to Cobourg. The base existed mainly to provide supplies to other military facilities, but also included the Canadian Army's only respirator assembly plant and a detachment of No. 22 Works Company of the Royal Canadian Engineers.

When the three arms of the Canadian military were integrated to create the Canadian Forces, No. 26 COD became No. 26 Canadian Forces Supply Depot and the base was renamed Canadian Forces Base Cobourg (CFB Cobourg) in 1966. However, as Cobourg didn't house two or more major units, it didn't qualify as a "base" under Canadian Forces' criteria and was renamed Canadian Forces Station Cobourg a short time later.

In 1969, the Canadian Forces supply system was reorganized and CFS Cobourg was identified as surplus. The supply duties of the base were assumed by depots at CFB Downsview in the Toronto area and at the Longue Point site of CFB Montreal; the station was closed and decommissioned on August 31, 1970.

The depot was sold to the government of Ontario, which converted it to an industrial park, and later sold it to the Town of Cobourg.

== Sources ==
Cobourg: Early Days and Modern Times. Cobourg, ON: Cobourg Book Committee, 1981. ISBN 0-9690887-0-1.

Ozorak, Paul. Abandoned Military Installations of Canada: Volume I: Ontario. 1991. ISBN 0-9695127-1-6.
