= Bark mill =

Edge mill for processing bark

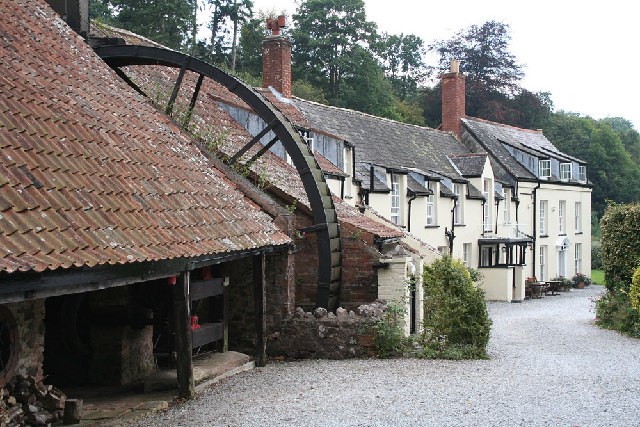
Overshot waterwheel at Combe House Hotel in Holford, Somerset, England.

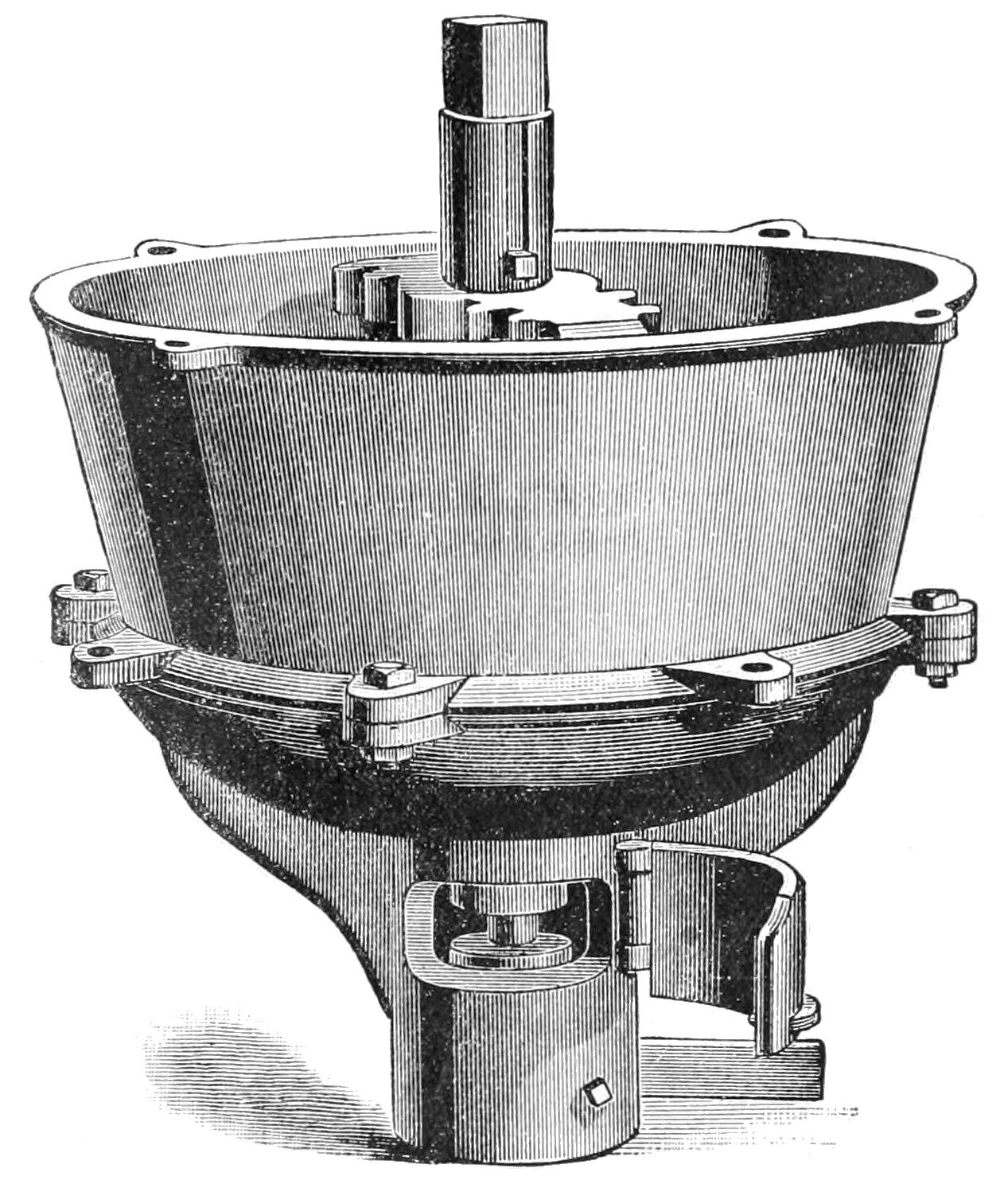
Bark mill - 1892 illustration in Popular Science Monthly Volume 41

Bark mills, also known as Catskill's mills, are water, steam, horse, ox or wind-powered edge mills used to process the bark, roots, and branches of various tree species into a fine powder known as tanbark, used for tanning leather. This powdering allowed the tannin to be extracted more efficiently from its woody source material. A barker would strip the bark from trees so that it might be ground in such mills, and the dried bark was often stored in bark houses.

== Machinery ==
Various machinery was used to chop, grind, riddle and pound the bark. These included Farcot’s bark-cutting machine (used extensively in France), Weldon’s bark-grinding mill, and a device known as a Wiltze's mill or Catskill's mill (prevalent in 19th-century America).

=== Manufacturers ===
- Goldie & McCulloch Company Ltd., was a Canadian steam engine manufacturer
- Huxhams & Brown, Exeter

== Known examples ==
=== in Australia ===
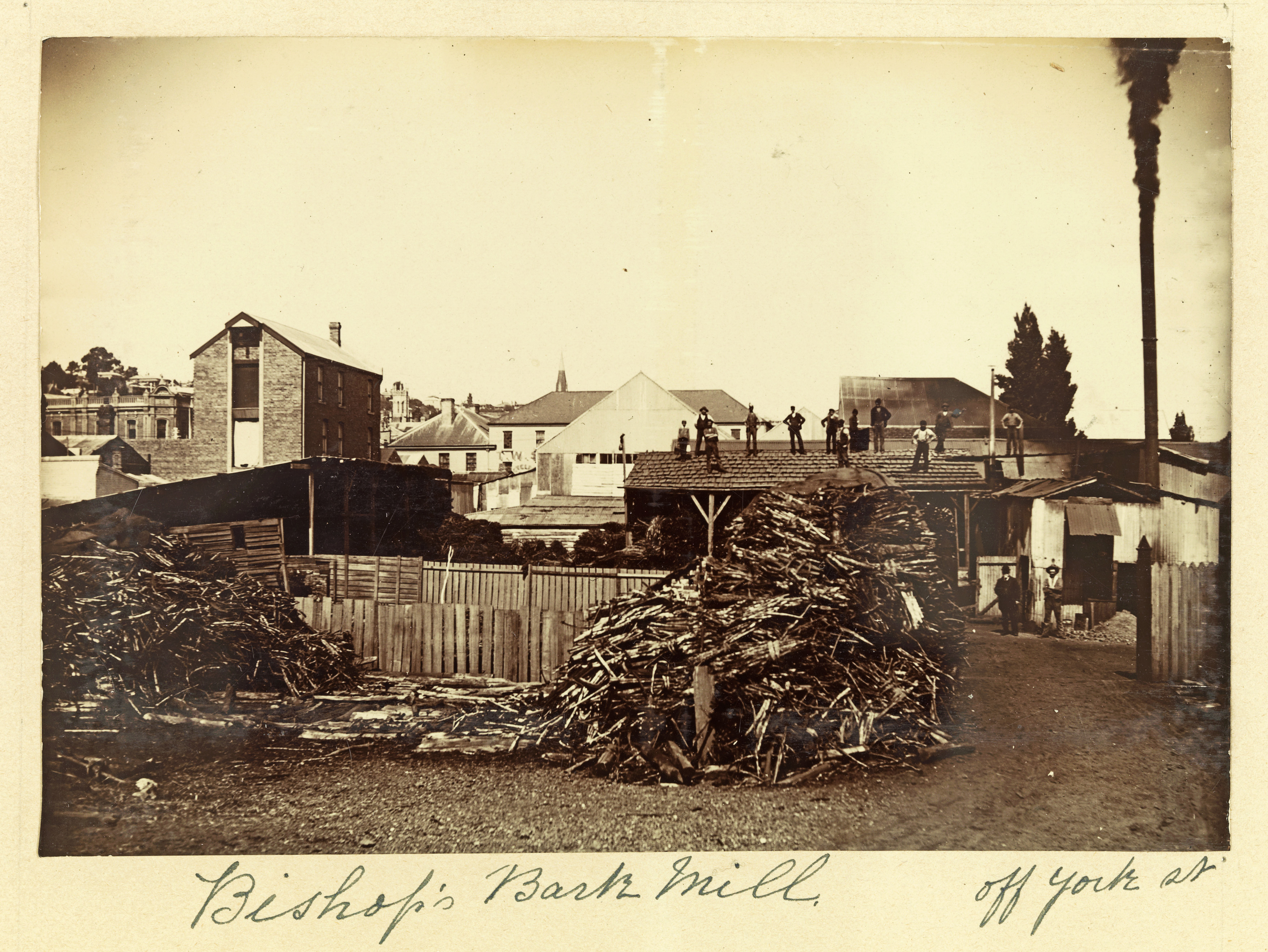
Bishop's Bark Mill (off York Street), Launceston (image from the Tasmanian Archive and Heritage Office - TAHO)

- The Swansea, Tasmania bark Mill processed black wattle bark in colonial times and is now a combined museum.

=== In Canada ===
- Mill in Dartmouth North Community Centre, a Community centre in Albro Lake, a neighbourhood in the North end of the community of Dartmouth in Nova Scotia's Halifax Regional Municipality

=== In Germany ===
- Mill in Lauterecken
- Mill in Niederhambach, Birkenfeld district, Rhineland-Palatinate
- Mill in Langenholzhausen (1818–1863)

=== In the Netherlands ===
- De Weert, Meppel, a smock mill in Meppel, Drenthe

=== In the United Kingdom ===
==== In England ====
- Bampton Bark Mill, in Bampton, Devon, England
- Overshot waterwheel at Combe House Hotel in Holford, Somerset, England. It was used to grind oak bark for the tannery complex established here in the 1840s. When the tannery closed in 1900 the waterwheel was adapted to other uses such as grinding grain for grist, cutting chaff, chopping apples for the cider press and generating electricity. It also cracked stones in a nearby quarry.
- Terling Windmill, in Terling, Essex - a grade II listed Smock mill. The mill was originally a bark mill, but was advertised for sale in 1818 as "new built", easily convertible to corn grinding.
- Heigham, Norwich - A tannery in Heigham, Norwich, Norfolk was advertised for sale in 1853. It was again advertised for sale and removal in 1863. It may have been moved to a new site and converted to a drainage mill.

==== In Scotland ====
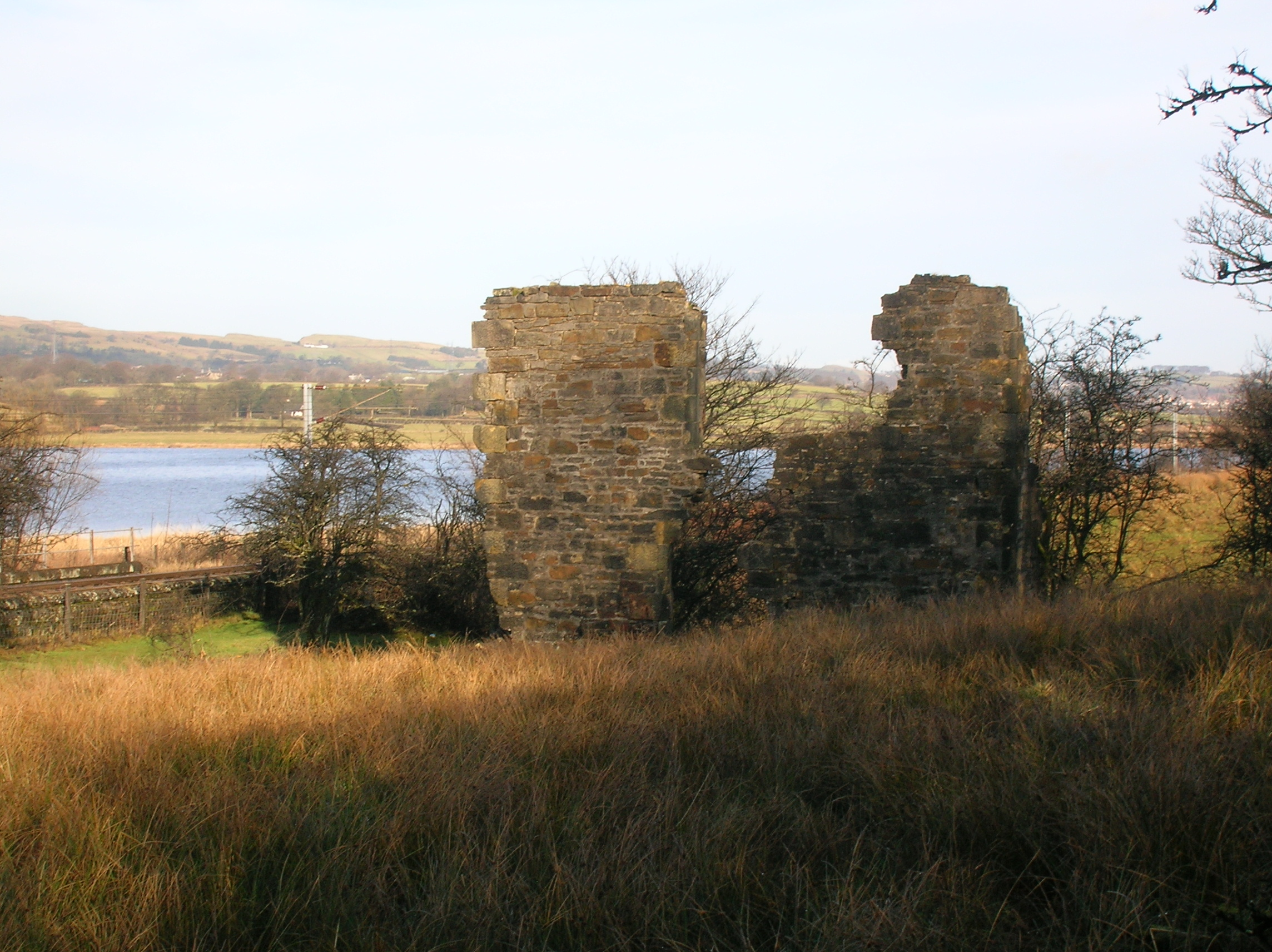
The Beith Bark Mill

- Beith Bark Mill, in Beith, North Ayrshire - On the east bank of Kilbirnie Loch near Beith in North Ayrshire stood a Bark Mill, most built by the Muir's of Mains House. It is marked on OS maps, and was powered by the combined Mains and Bath Burns, with mill ponds indicated. The mill produced ground bark for use in the Beith Bath Lane tannery, using bark from the old oak trees that forested the loch side. Later the mill became a furniture factory run by Matthew Pollock who applied the use of machinery to help with the manufacture of furniture in 1858. This site was one mile from the Beith town centre. The Glasgow & South Western Railway Company constructed a siding, known as 'Muir's siding' for the convenience of transporting the finished products, etc. The site was isolated and inconvenient for the workers and was eventually sold to Robert Balfour, who later built a new factory near Beith Town Station, the West of Scotland Cabinet Works. The Muirs had been tanners for many generations and around 1791 John Muir and Sons, Tanners, Curriers, and Fancy Leather Manufacturers had become established at the Bath Lane works. William Muir of Mains joined as a partner in 1846.
- Mill on the Fleet, in Gatehouse of Fleet, Castle Douglas - Built in 1788 as a cotton spinning mill by James Birtwhistle from Yorkshire. The water wheel on the gable end was used to drive the machinery to spin the cotton. By 1800 the cotton industry in Gatehouse declined and by 1850 the mills were out of use. In 1859, they were bought by the Helme brothers from Dalbeattie and the mill was used as a store and bark mill.
- Mill in Hessilhead

=== In the United States ===
- Mill in Bradford, Massachusetts
- Mill in New Boston, New Hampshire
- Mill in New Milford Plant of the Hackensack Water Company, New Jersey
- Mill in Barkcamp State Park, Belmont County, Ohio

== Gallery ==
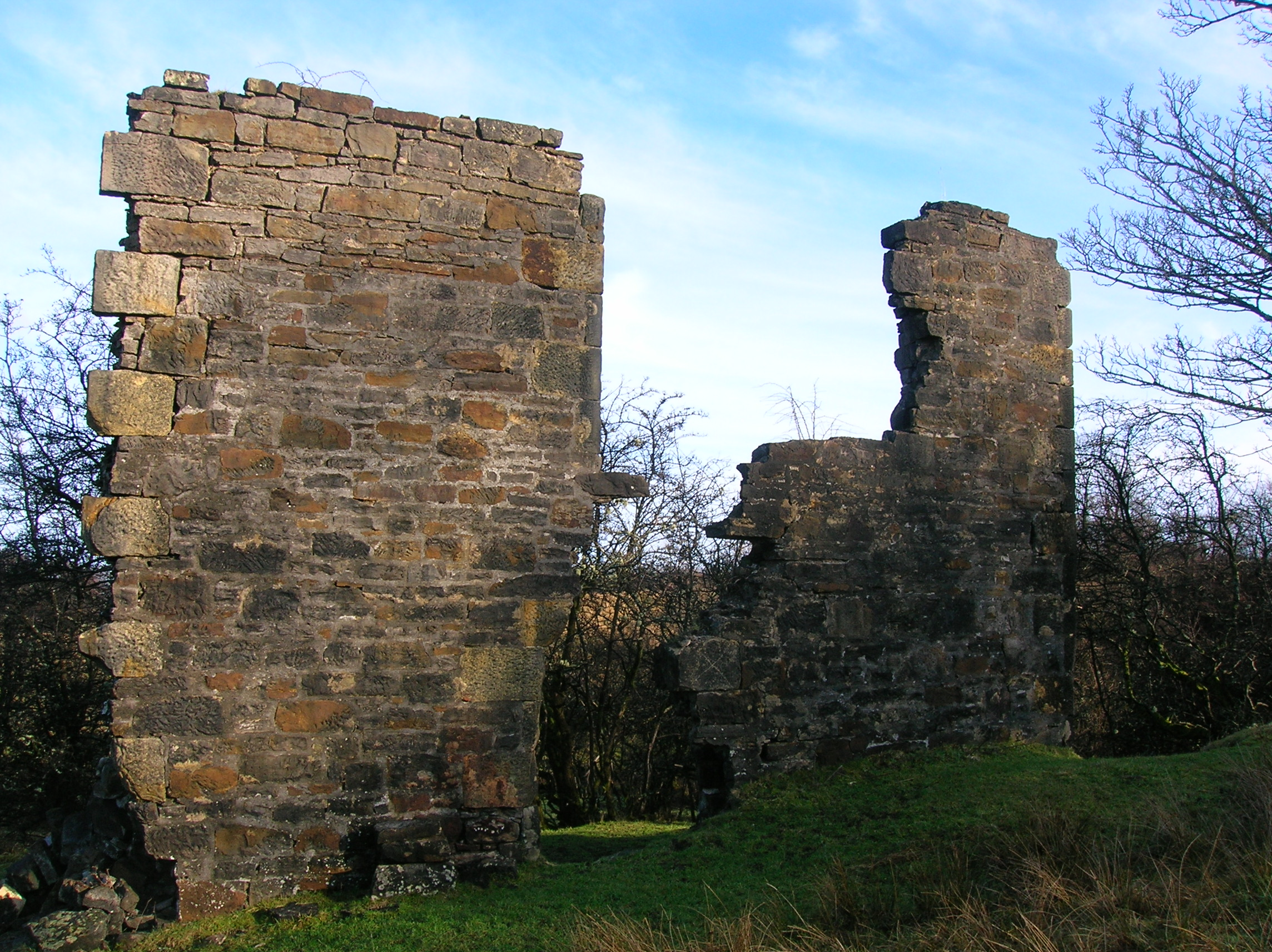
The old Bark Mill on the Mains Burn near Beith

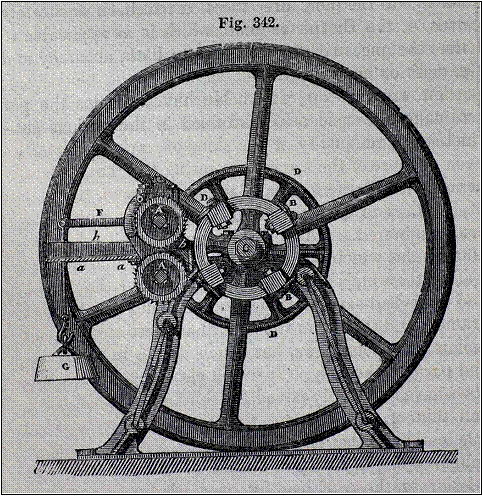
Farcot bark-cutting machine, elevation - illustration in Muspratt’s Chemistry, Theoretical, Practical & Analytical (ca. 1859)

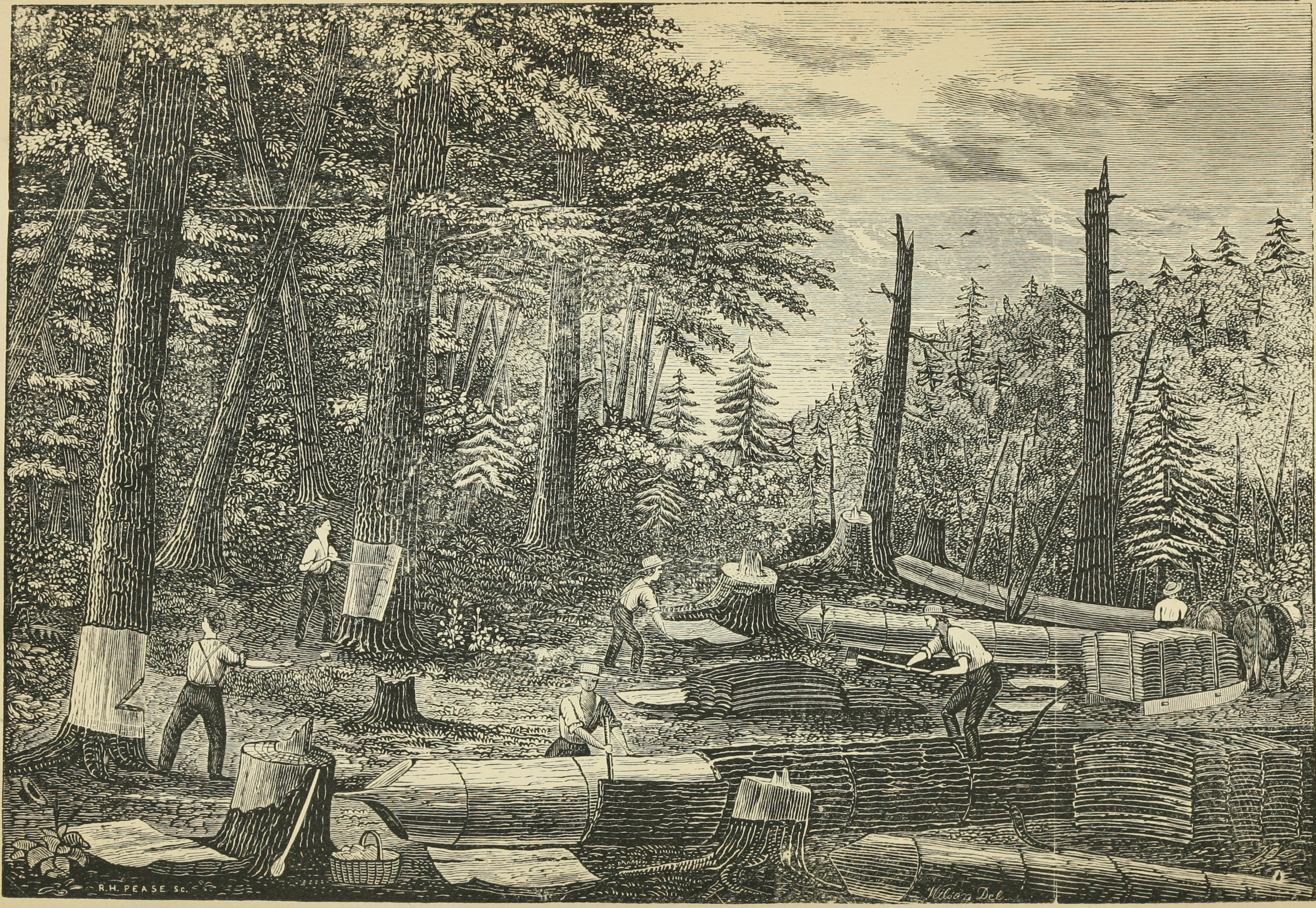
Peeling bark for the tannery in Prattsville, New York, during the 1840s, when it was the largest in the world.

== See also ==
- List of types of mill
