= Albro Lake =

Lake in Nova Scotia, Canada

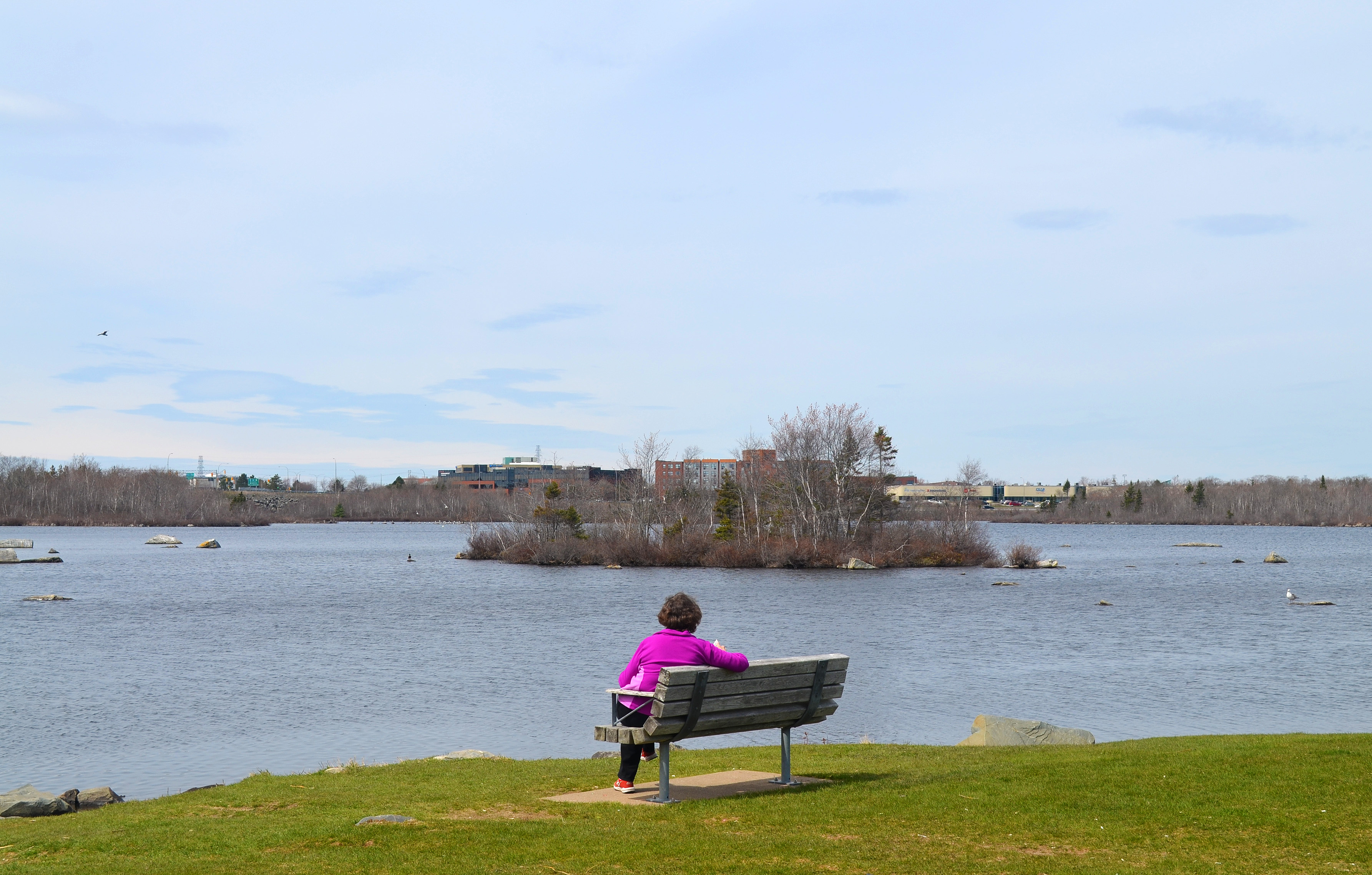
- Albro Lake viewed from the south

- Location within Nova Scotia
- Location: Halifax Regional Municipality, Nova Scotia
- Coordinates: 44°41′19.9″N 63°34′35.9″W
- Basin countries: Canada
- Max. length: 740 m (2,430 ft)
- Max. width: 410 m (1,350 ft)
- Max. depth: 6 m (20 ft)
- Surface elevation: 60 m (200 ft)
- Settlements: Albro Lake, Nova Scotia

Albro Lake is a lake of Halifax Regional Municipality, in Nova Scotia, Canada in the community of Dartmouth.

The lake lends its name to the surrounding Albro Lake neighbourhood of Dartmouth.

There are several public parks along the shores of the lake, including the Albro Lake Beach and Albro Lake Park.

== See also ==
- List of lakes in Nova Scotia
