= John Albro =

Canadian politician

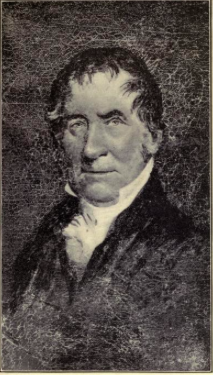
John Albro (1764-1839)

John Albro (May 6, 1764 – October 23, 1839) was a merchant and political figure in Nova Scotia. He represented Halifax Township in the Nova Scotia House of Assembly from 1818 to 1826. He was also a Lieutenant-Colonel of the 4th Regiment of Halifax militia.

He was born in Newport Township, Nova Scotia, the son of Samuel Albro and Jane Cole, who had come from Rhode Island. He was buried in the Old Burying Ground (Halifax, Nova Scotia).

== Background ==
Albro operated a tannery in Halifax, later operating as a butcher and then a hardware merchant. In 1793, he married Elizabeth Margaret Vandergrift. He married Elizabeth Margaret Dupuy in 1803. He helped establish the Fire Insurance Association of Halifax in 1809. Albro was a grand master in the freemasons. He also served as a road commissioner and fire warden for Halifax and reached the rank of lieutenant-colonel in the local militia. He was a member of the Charitable Irish Society of Halifax. He was defeated in a bid for re-election to the House of Assembly in 1826. Albro died in Halifax at the age of 75.

== Ancestry ==
Albro is a descendant of early Rhode Island settlers John Albro and Samuel Wilbore, as well as Wilbore's son, Samuel Wilbur, Jr. He also descends from the first Innkeeper of Boston, Massachusetts, Samuel Cole, and from Indian captive Susanna (Hutchinson) Cole, her father, Rhode Island magistrate William Hutchinson, and his famous wife, the religious heretic, Anne Hutchinson.

== Legacy ==
- He was a grand master in the freemasons and the John Albro Lodge is named after him
- Albro Lake and the nearby neighbourhood with the same name in the community of Dartmouth were named after John Albro.

Ancestors of John Albro

16. Samuel Albro (1645-1739)
8. John Albro (c.1680-1747)
17. Isabel Lawton (say 1650-1730)
4. Samuel Albro (born 1716)
18. Benoni Sweet (born 1663)
9. Margaret Sweet (1690-1727)
19. Elizabeth (Machester?) (c.1667-1727)
2. Samuel Albro (1738-1791)
20. William Browning (1651-1730)
10. Samuel Browning (1688-after 1740)
21. Rebecca Wilbur (c.1662-1728)
5. Lois Browning (born 1720)
22. Samuel Clark
11. Mercy Clark (c.1692-c.1741)
23. _______ Wilbur
1. John Albro (1764-1839)
24. John Cole (c.1626-c.1707)
12. William Cole (1671-1734)
25. Susanna Hutchinson (1633-1713)
6. John Cole (1702-1792)
26. Jacob Pinder
13. Ann Pinder
3. Jane Cole
7. Ann
