= Cambridge Military Library =

Canadian public library

Coordinates: 44°38′40″N 63°34′37″W

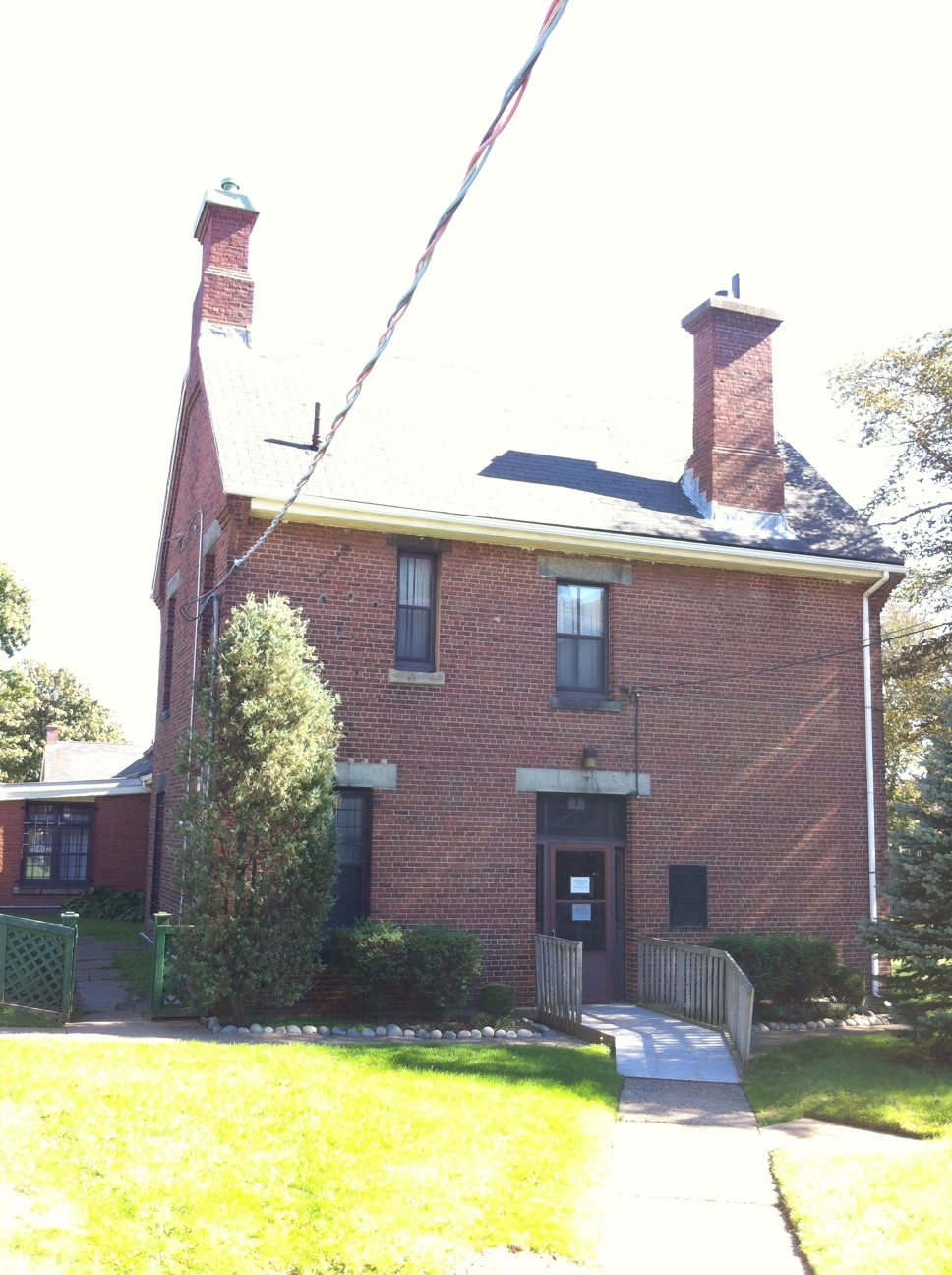
Cambridge Military Library

Cambridge Military Library is a library building in Royal Artillery Park in Halifax, Nova Scotia, Canada which was built in 1886. The building was created to house the garrison library collection, which had been moved from various locations in the city since its creation in 1817. It is the oldest non-university public library collection in Canada. (When the library was established, there were still no bookstores in the Atlantic region.) This building was the social and literary centre of military Halifax. In 1902, the officers of the garrison requested the library be named after the Prince George, Duke of Cambridge.

== History ==
Along with Dalhousie College, Lord Dalhousie established the book collection with the Castine Fund, established from the fortune taken from New Ireland (Maine) during the War of 1812. Dalhousie housed the collection in "The Seedsman's House" on Spring Garden Road, and it was later moved to building in the Glacis Barracks, on the north side of the Halifax citadel. It was later moved to a building on Water Street before being established in its current location.

The original membership of the library in 1818 included:

- Col. Joseph Frederick Wallet DesBarres
- Oliver Goldsmith (Canadian poet)
- Sir George Head
- Sir Howard Douglas
- John Frederick Fitzgerald de Roos
- Captain William Moorsom

By 1835, the library included the best works published in the English language. In the 1860s the library holdings were considerably augmented by a very valuable collection of books transferred from Corfu, which had originated from the Garrison Library at Messina in Sicily in 1810. By 1886, by the time the Cambridge Military Library was built, the library collection totaled 3,000 volumes.

== Commemoration ==
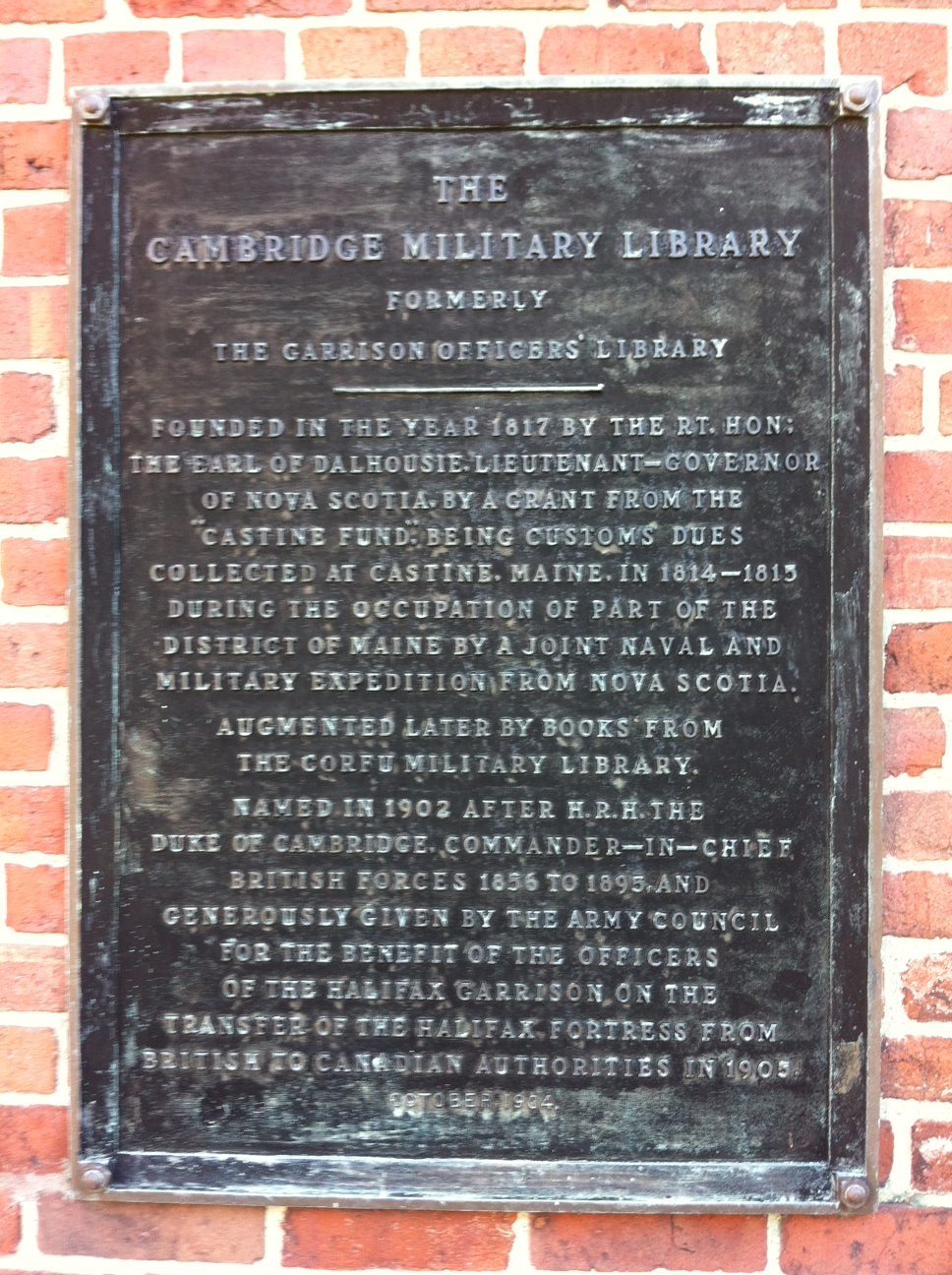
Cambridge Military Library Plaque Halifax Nova Scotia

On October 29, 1934 a tablet was unveiled by Lt. Gov. Walter Harold Covert. The historic importance of the library is reflected in those who attended the ceremony:

- Premier Angus MacDonald
- Halifax Mayor Edward Joseph Cragg
- Chief Justice Gordon Harrington
- Frank Patterson,
- Dr. Carleton Stanley
- Harry Piers
- Commander Leonard W. Murray
- Mr. D.C. Harvey
- Frederick Henry Sexton
- Colonel Eaton (Annapolis)
- General Foster (Kentville)
- Brigadier General Halfdan Hertzberg
- Lt. Col. H.T. Goodeve
- Band of the Princess Louise Fusiliers

== See also ==
- List of historic places in Halifax, Nova Scotia
- List of oldest buildings and structures in Halifax, Nova Scotia
- Military history of Nova Scotia
