= Albro Lake, Nova Scotia =

- Neighbourhood
- Interactive map of Albro Lake, Nova Scotia
- Location within Nova Scotia
- Coordinates: 44°41′3″N 63°34′53″W
- Country: Canada
- Province: Nova Scotia
- Municipality: Halifax Regional Municipality
- Community: Dartmouth
- Community council: Harbour East - Marine Drive Community Council
- District: 6 - Harbourview - Burnside - Dartmouth East

Area
  - Total: 1.47 km^{2} (0.57 sq mi)
- Elevation: 60 m (200 ft)
- Postal code: B3A
- Area codes: 902, 782

Albro Lake is a neighbourhood in the North End of the community of Dartmouth in Nova Scotia's Halifax Regional Municipality.

The neighbourhood includes the Highfield Park and Crystal Heights. A newer development Lancaster Ridge is built on the former Department of National Defence housing lands. Albro Lake is bounded by Leaman Drive to the west, Lancaster Ridge to the east, Highway 111 to the north, and Albro Lake Road to the south.

The streets are named for aircraft used by the Royal Canadian Air Force.

== History ==
Albro Lake takes its name from the shallow freshwater lakes of the same name located in the area. The lakes were named for the brothers John and Samuel Albro, who used the stream that flowed from the lakes to operate a nail factory and tannery on their property near St. Paul's Church on Windmill Road. The area was first settled during the 19th century.

During World War II, the navy established a radio communications centre in the area and built housing for its operators and their families. The station operated until 1968. This land was subsequently used to develop Highfield Park.

The housing in the neighbourhood is a mixture, ranging from high-density low-rental apartment buildings in Highfield Park built during the 1970s and 1980s, to small single-family houses, duplexes, townhouses and small apartment buildings. The socio-economic indicators for the neighbourhood show that it comprises mostly low-to-middle income households.

== Neighbourhood amenities ==
=== Parks ===
- Albro Lake Park
- Golden Acres Park

=== Natural areas ===
- Albro Lake
- Little Albro Lake
- Martin Lake

=== Sports facilities ===
- Grey Arena

=== Schools ===
- John MacNeil Elementary School
- John Martin Junior High

=== Community facilities ===
- Dartmouth North Community Centre

=== Memorials ===
- Halifax Explosion memorial
  - Located at the intersection of Albro Lake Road and Pinecrest Drive, this memorial is dedicated to the victims of the Halifax Explosion. Part of a large-calibre surface defense gun from the French ship Mont Blanc landed adjacent to the memorial site, 1.5 kilometres from the explosion centre.
- Jason MacCullough Memorial Park
  - Memorial park dedicated to the victim of an unsolved murder in the neighborhood.
