= NRS Albro Lake =

Naval Radio Station Albro Lake (NRS Albro Lake) was a naval radio station operated by the Royal Canadian Navy (RCN).

Established in 1942 surrounding Albro Lake, then several kilometres north of the town of Dartmouth, Nova Scotia. NRS Albro Lake was divided into two locations: the primary receiving site was located on the grounds of NRS Albro Lake, and its primary transmitting site was located at NRS Newport Corner, 50 kilometres northwest (NRS Newport Corner being a sub-unit of NRS Albro Lake). NRS Albro Lake also had secondary transmitting capabilities for forwarding along transmissions it received.

Its callsign was CFH and it was constructed for $6 million. It could receive from (and transmit to, through NRS Newport Corner) locations halfway across the world and stretching from Murmansk, Russia to the Falkland Islands. The facility was instrumental in helping allied navies during the Battle of the Atlantic in combating the U-boat threat.

NRS Albro Lake was renamed HMCS Albro Lake on July 1, 1956. Dartmouth's growth during the post-war years degraded radio reception as the town became a city by the early 1960s. Unification of the Canadian Forces in 1968 resulted in HMCS Albro Lake closing. CFS Mill Cove opened in 1967 as the replacement receiving station.

The site of NRS Albro Lake is now occupied by Highfield Park housing development.
