= Naval Radio Section Newport Corner =

Canadian military facility in Nova Scotia

Coordinates: 44°58′4.09″N 63°59′3.44″W

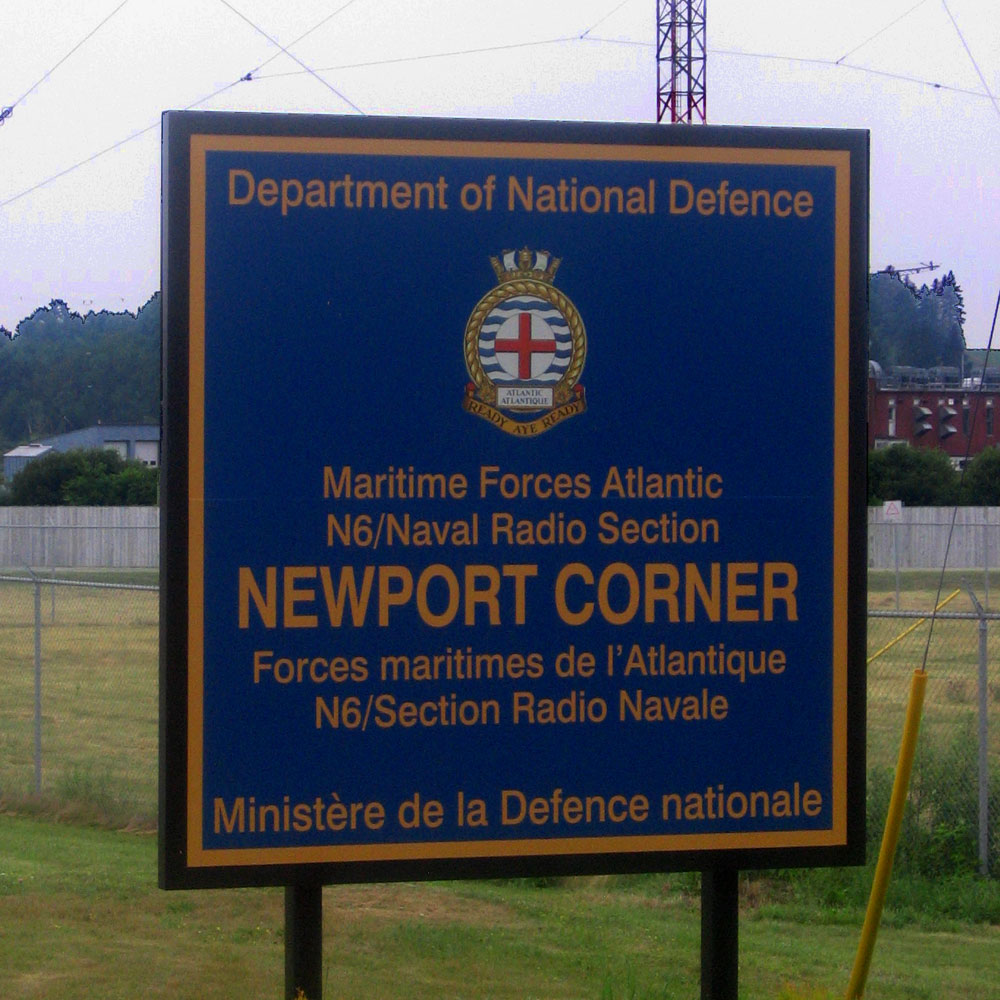
NRS Newport Corner

Naval Radio Section Newport Corner (NRS Newport Corner) is a Canadian Forces naval radio station located in Brooklyn, Nova Scotia. Founded in 1942, it is still in operation today but remotely controlled from CFB Halifax.

== History ==
NRS Newport Corner was established by the Royal Canadian Navy (RCN) in 1942 in the St. Croix River valley in Newport Corner, 50 kilometres northwest of NRS Albro Lake in Dartmouth.

NRS Newport Corner was a sub-unit of NRS Albro Lake and functioned as the primary transmitting facility, while the receiving facility was located at Albro Lake. A landline connected the two operations. A secondary transmitter was co-located at NRS Albro Lake should the connection to NRS Newport Corner fail. The callsign for NRS Albro Lake (which was responsible for both facilities) was "CFH" and the combined construction cost was $6 million. NRS Newport Corner was a critical component in the success of the RCN and its allies in the Battle of the Atlantic; it could transmit to locations halfway across the world, stretching from Murmansk, Russia to the Falkland Islands. The powerful radio transmissions regularly leaked into passing car radio which would pick up routine Morse Code naval traffic and disrupted local television reception. Transmitters were often moved to low-power during the Stanley Cup hockey playoffs as a courtesy to nearby residents.

NRS Albro Lake and its sub-unit NRS Newport Corner was renamed HMCS Albro Lake on July 1, 1956. Permanent married quarters (PMQs) were constructed on the site during this time. Dartmouth's growth during the post-war years degraded radio reception in Albro Lake as the town became a city by the early 1960s. Unification of the Canadian Forces in 1968 resulted in the Albro Lake location closing and the unit HMCS Albro Lake was recommissioned as CFS Mill Cove when the new receiving facility opened at Mill Cove, approximately 50 kilometres west of Halifax in 1967.

NRS Newport Corner functioned much as before, as a detachment of CFS Mill Cove instead of HMCS Albro Lake. Defence cutbacks in the late 1990s saw both the Newport Corner transmitter and the Mill Cove receiver automated from CFB Halifax, eliminating the requirement for a separately administered Canadian Forces Station, thus CFS Mill Cove was decommissioned and both facilities were renamed as "Naval Radio Section".

Both the NRS Newport Corner transmitter and NRS Mill Cove receivers are operated remotely from HMCS Trinity at CFB Halifax and function as detachments of the base.
