= List of communities in Lunenburg County, Nova Scotia =

List of communities in Lunenburg County, Nova Scotia

Communities are ordered by the highway on which they are located, whose routes start after each terminus near the largest community.

== Trunk routes ==
- Trunk 3: Middlewood - Italy Cross - Hebb's Cross - Hebbville - Bridgewater - Dayspring - Upper LaHave -Rhodes Corner - Spectacle Lakes - Centre - Lunenburg - Deans Corner - Martin's Brook - Mader's Cove - Mahone Bay - Oakland - Martin's River - Martin's Point - Western Shore - Gold River - Chester Basin - Marriott's Cove - Robinsons Corner - Chester - East River
- Trunk 10: Bridgewater - Cookville -West Northfield - Northfield - Pinehurst - New Germany - Meiseners Section - Cherryfield
- Trunk 12: Chester Basin - Chester Grant - Seffernsville - New Ross - Aldersville

== Collector roads ==
- Route 208: New Germany - Simpson's Corner - Hemford - Nineveh - Colpton
- Route 210: Newcombville - Chelsea - Upper Chelsea
- Route 324: Lunenburg - Lilydale - Northwest - Fauxburg - Blockhouse - Middle New Cornwall - Upper New Cornwall
- Route 325: Mahone Bay - Blockhouse - Maitland - Oak Hill - Bridgewater - Wileville - Newcombville - Bakers Settlement - West Clifford
- Route 329: East River - Deep Cove - Blandford - Bayswater - Aspotogan - Northwest Cove - Mill Cove - Fox Point
- Route 331: Bridgewater - Pleasantville - West LaHave - Pentz - LaHave - Dublin Shore - Crescent Beach - Petite Rivière - Broad Cove - Cherry Hill - Vogler's Cove
- Route 332: Lunenburg - First South - Bayport - Rose Bay - Riverport - East LaHave - Middle LaHave - Upper LaHave

== Rural roads ==
- Auburndale
- Back Centre
- Barry's Corner
- Barss Corner
- Beech Hill
- Blue Rocks
- Camperdown
- Canaan
- Clearland
- Conquerall Mills
- Crouse's Settlement
- Crousetown
- East Clifford
- Elmwood
- Farmington
- Farmville
- Feltzen South
- First Peninsula
- Five Houses
- Forties
- Franey Corner
- Fraxville
- Front Centre
- Glengarry
- Grimm's Settlement
- Heckman's Island
- Herman's Island
- Indian Path
- Indian Point
- Kingsburg
- Laconia
- Lake Centre
- Lake Ramsay
- Lake William
- Lapland
- Leville
- Lower Branch
- Lower Northfield
- Maplewood
- Mader's Cove
- Martins Point
- Mason's Beach
- Middle New Cornwall
- Midville Branch
- Mill Road
- Mount Pleasant
- New Canada
- New Cumberland
- New Elm
- New Russell
- Newburne
- North River
- Oakland
- Parkdale
- Pine Grove
- Schnare's Crossing
- Second Peninsula
- Stanburn
- Stanley Section
- Stonehurst
- Sunnybrook
- Sweetland
- Big Tancook Island
- Tanner's Settlement
- The Ovens
- Union Square
- Upper Branch
- Upper Northfield
- Walden
- Waterloo
