= Municipality of the District of Chester =

Provides local government to the rural residents in part of Nova Scotia, Canada

Chester
- District municipality
- Municipality of the District of Chester
- Seal
- Motto: Nova Scotia's Treasure
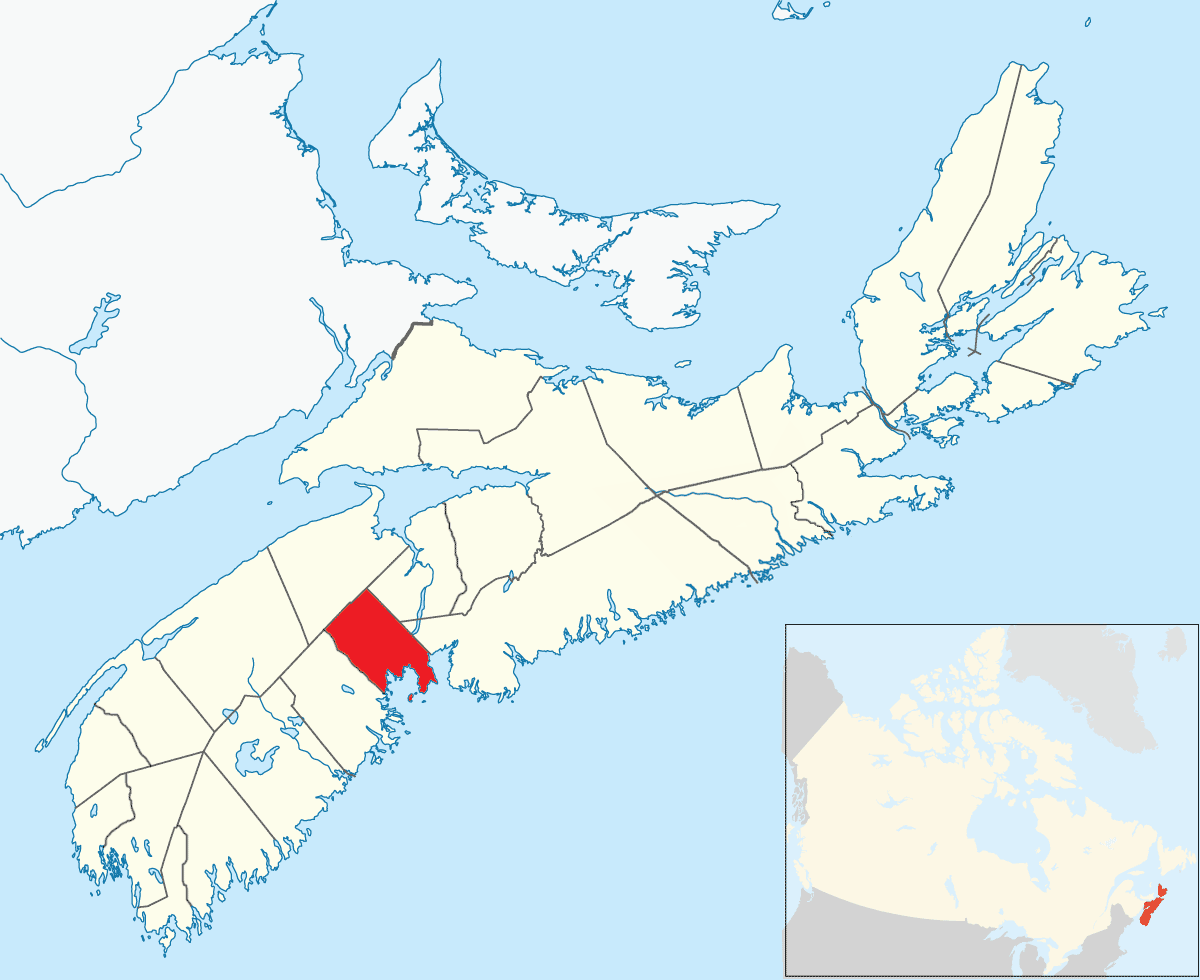
- Location of the Municipality of the District of Chester
- Coordinates: 44.65°N 64.3°W
- Country: Canada
- Province: Nova Scotia
- County: Lunenburg
- Incorporated: April 17, 1879
- Electoral Districts Federal: South Shore—St. Margaret's
- Provincial: Chester-St. Margaret's / Lunenburg

Government
  - Type: Municipal Council
  - Municipal Seat: Chester
  - Warden: Allen Webber

Area
  - Land: 1,122.11 km^{2} (433.25 sq mi)

Population (2021)
  - Total: 10,693
  - Density: 9.5294/km^{2} (24.681/sq mi)
  - Change 2016-21: ▲3.7%
- Time zone: UTC-4 (AST)
  - Summer (DST): UTC-3 (ADT)
- Area code: 902
- Dwellings: 6,482
- Average Income*: $47,360 CDN
- Website: Official website
- Average 2020 total income

The Municipality of the District of Chester is a Nova Scotia district municipality occupying the northeastern half of Lunenburg County, Canada.

The district boundary was originally drawn for court sessional purposes, before the existence of elected local government. In 1879 it became a district municipality, to provide local government to the residents who live outside incorporated towns. under the authority of the Municipal Government Act of 1998.

The Municipality of the District of Chester is also a census division for Statistics Canada.

== Municipal Council ==
The Municipality of Chester has a town council that consists of 7 councillors and a warden who is appointed by the council, the municipal council was incorporated and founded in 1879. Elections to the council occur every four years unless there is a vacancy. If there is a vacancy in a district, a by-election occurs and the person who is elected will serve their term until the next scheduled election in the four-year cycle.

=== Municipal Districts ===
- District 1: includes the communities Aspotogan, Bayswater, Blandford, Northwest Cove, Deep Cove, East River, and part of East Chester.
- District 2: Hubbards, Mill Cove, Fox Point, Simms Settlement, Mill Lake, and The Lodge.
- District 3: Chester village and part of East Chester.
- District 4: Chester Basin, Chester Grant, and part of Middle River.
- District 5: Gold River, Beech Hill, Western Shore, Martin's Point, and part of Martin's River.
- District 6: Seffernsville, Lake Ramsay, Forties, Franey Corner, and Fraxville.
- District 7: Windsor Road, Canaan, Sherwood, and Marriotts Cove.

=== Council Sessions ===
The current warden of the Municipality is Allen Webber, and the current deputy warden is Andre Veinotte

2024-2028 Council Session
Party	District	Name
No Affiliation	1	Andre Veinotte
No Affiliation	2	Clarissa Coolen
No Affiliation	3	Tom Bremner
No Affiliation	4	Allen Webber
No Affiliation	5	Abdella Assaff
No Affiliation	6	Tina Connors
No Affiliation	7	Sharon Church

2020-2024 Council Session
Party	District	Name
No Affiliation	1	Andre Veinotte
No Affiliation	2	Floyd Shatford
No Affiliation	3	Derek Wells
No Affiliation	4	Allen Webber
No Affiliation	5	Abdella Assaff
No Affiliation	6	Tina Connors
No Affiliation	7	Sharon Church

*Following the 2021 Nova Scotia general election, District 3 councillor Danielle Barkhouse was elected as MLA to the riding of Chester-St. Margaret's. Following her election, she tendered her resignation from the municipal council, triggering a special election where Derek Wells was elected councillor, for the remainder of the 2020-2024 council session.

2016-2020 Council Session
Party	District	Name
No Affiliation	1	Andre Veinotte
No Affiliation	2	Floyd Shatford
No Affiliation	3	Danielle Barkhouse
No Affiliation	4	Allen Webber
No Affiliation	5	Abdella Assaff
No Affiliation	6	Tina Connors
No Affiliation	7	Sharon Church

Nova Scotian Municipal politics do not have party affiliations.

== Departments and services ==
There are five departments in the district:

- Community Development & Recreation
- Corporate & Strategic Management
- Financial & Information Services
- Public Works
- Solid Waste

== Demographics ==
Historical population
Year	Pop.	±%
1981	10,230	—
1986	10,579	+3.4%
1991	10,762	+1.7%
1996	10,602	−1.5%
2001	10,781	+1.7%
2006	10,741	−0.4%
2011	10,599	−1.3%
2016	10,310	−2.7%
2021	10,693	+3.7%
Source: Statistics Canada:

In the 2021 Census of Population conducted by Statistics Canada, the Municipality of the District of Chester had a population of 10,693 living in 5,028 of its 6,482 total private dwellings, a change of 3.7% from its 2016 population of 10,310. With a land area of 1,120.61 km^{2} (432.67 sq mi), it had a population density of 9.5/km^{2} (24.7/sq mi) in 2021.

Mother tongue language (2006)
Language	Population	Pct (%)
English only	10,145	95.40%
Other languages	365	3.43%
French only	110	1.03%
Both English and French	15	0.14%

== Parks, playgrounds and open spaces ==
The municipality operates 46 kilometres (29 mi) of trail on the former railway from Martins River to Hubbards. The trails are open to walkers, off-road vehicles, cyclists and horseback riders.

Parks and outdoor areas include Anvil Park in Chester Basin, East River Property, Village of Chester Gazebo, Wild Rose Park in Western Shore, a Green Gym Park in Chester Basin, Castle Rock in East River. There are six beaches along the coast, public wharves and launches, and several islands preserved for public use (including four owned by the Municipality of Chester).

The Municipality of the District of Chester also has two playgrounds; Croft Road Playground located in Chester Basin and Gold River Playground located at the former Gold River Elementary School.

Within the Village of Chester there is a skate park that was opened in 2009 after five years of planning and fundraising.

== Schools ==
The Municipality of the District of Chester has five schools within its boundaries. All five are open to the public for community use. These schools are Forest Heights Community School (FHCS) in Chester Grant; Aspotogan Consolidated Elementary School (ACES) in Mill Cove; Chester Area Middle School in Chester; Chester District Elementary School in Chester, and New Ross Consolidated School in New Ross.

== Economy ==
The Municipality identifies five sectors: arts, culture & recreation; business services; construction; green industries; and niche manufacturing.

=== Arts, Culture & Recreation ===
The Municipality has a high concentration of arts, entertainment, and recreation workers with artist-in-residents programs, galleries, a theatre, golf courses, museums, marinas, and the first and only Nordic spa in Nova Scotia. Productions filmed in the Municipality include:

- Moonshine
- The Sinner
- Good House
- Candles on Bay Street
- Christmas With Holly
- Delores Claiborne
- Haven
- The Curse of Oak Island
- The Healer
- Two if by Sea
- Feudal
