= Northfield, Nova Scotia =

Northfield could be the following places in the Province of Nova Scotia, Canada:

- Northfield, Hants, Nova Scotia (in Hants County)
- Northfield, Queens, Nova Scotia (in the Region of Queens Municipality)
- In Lunenberg County:
  - Northfield, Lunenberg, Nova Scotia
  - Lower Northfield, Nova Scotia
  - West Northfield, Nova Scotia
  - Upper Northfield, Nova Scotia
