= Glengarry (disambiguation) =

A Glengarry is a boat-shaped cap without a peak made of thick-milled woollen material.

Glengarry may also refer to any of the following:

== Places ==
=== In Australia ===
- Glengarry, New South Wales, an opal mining field.
- Glengarry, Tasmania
- Glengarry, Victoria, a town in Australia
- Glengarry (Campus of The Scots College), Sydney, Australia
- Glengarry, Western Australia, A suburb of Perth

=== In Canada ===
==== Alberta ====
- Glengarry (Edmonton), a residential neighbourhood in Edmonton

==== Nova Scotia ====
- Glengarry, Inverness County
- Glengarry, Lunenburg, Nova Scotia, a community
- Glengarry, Pictou, Nova Scotia, a community

==== Ontario ====
- Glengarry (federal electoral district), a former federal electoral district represented in the Canadian House of Commons
- Glengarry County, Ontario, a historic county
- Glengarry—Prescott—Russell, a federal and provincial electoral district
- Glengarry and Stormont, a former federal electoral district represented in the Canadian House of Commons
- North Glengarry, Ontario, a township
- South Glengarry, Ontario, a township
- Stormont, Dundas and Glengarry United Counties, Ontario, a census division
- Stormont—Dundas—South Glengarry, a federal and provincial electoral district

=== In New Zealand ===
- Glengarry, New Zealand, a suburb of Invercargill

=== In the United Kingdom ===
- The valley of the River Garry, Inverness-shire
- The valley of the River Garry, Perthshire

== Organisations ==
- Glengarry Shinty Club, a shinty team from Glengarry, Inverness-shire, Scotland
- The Stormont, Dundas and Glengarry Highlanders, a reserve infantry regiment of the Canadian Forces
- Glengarry Bhoys, a Celtic fusion band from Canada
- Glengarry Light Infantry, properly the Glengarry Light Infantry Fencibles, a light infantry unit raised in Glengarry District of Upper Canada to fight in the War of 1812.

== People ==
- Clan MacDonell of Glengarry, a Scottish clan
  - Alexander Ranaldson MacDonell of Glengarry (1771–1828), 15th chief of Clan MacDonell of Glengarry
