= Lunenburg, Nova Scotia (disambiguation) =

Lunenburg, Nova Scotia can mean:

- Lunenburg, Nova Scotia (town)
- Lunenburg, Nova Scotia (municipal district)
- Lunenburg County, Nova Scotia
