= Barss Corner, Nova Scotia =

Coordinates: 44°33′30.35″N 64°41′54.55″W

Barss Corner, in Nova Scotia

Barss Corner is a community in the Canadian province of Nova Scotia, located in Lunenburg County. It is located approximately 30 kilometres north of Bridgewater and 68 kilometres south of Middleton, Annapolis County. It has a population of 476 as of the 2021 census.

== History ==
Before adopting the name Barss Corner, the community was known as Centreville, a designation that reflected its location among several neighbouring settlements, including New Germany, Watford (formerly Durland's Settlement), and Parkdale-Maplewood (formerly Foster's Settlement). The community traces its origins to 1838, when approximately twenty families arrived from the Hanley Mountain and Nictaux regions. Travelling by foot, horseback, and sled, these settlers acquired land from large grants that had been issued by the Crown to individuals such as Captain William Ross of New Ross. After purchasing their properties, they cleared forested land and established farms and homesteads.

== Early life ==
Among the earliest settlers were Joseph Barss Sr. and his wife Elizabeth Robinson, whose descendants became closely associated with the community. Other founding families included the Chesley's, Durland's, DeLong's, Nichols', and many others who contributed to the area's growth and development.

Life for the first settlers was demanding and largely self-sufficient. Families constructed log homes with stone chimneys and large fireplaces that provided both heat and a means of cooking. Before the widespread availability of matches, fire was often preserved overnight by keeping embers alive until morning. Residents tapped maple trees for syrup, cultivated large gardens, and preserved food for the long winter months. Hunting, fishing, and small-scale livestock farming supplied additional food and materials. Deer tallow was commonly used for candle-making, while sheep's wool was spun into yarn and feathers from poultry were gathered for bedding.

As the settlement matured, a variety of industries and businesses emerged. These included grist mills, lumber mills, country stores, carpentry shops, a tannery, a carding mill, a stave mill, and a successful cooperage that produced barrels and casks. A funeral home and ambulance service were eventually established, and postal services were introduced through the efforts of a local blacksmith.

General stores played a vital role in community life. Residents often travelled considerable distances to purchase supplies, many of which were sold in bulk quantities. The first known store in Barss Corner was built by Joseph Wentzell of Parkdale. Over time, additional stores were opened and operated by local families, including the Morton's, DeLong's, Mader's, and Nauss'. These businesses served not only Barss Corner but also neighbouring communities.

A number of skilled trades flourished in the area. Blacksmithing was particularly important, with several shops operating throughout the years. Among the most notable was the shop of Freeland Minard, who worked in the trade for nearly seventy years.

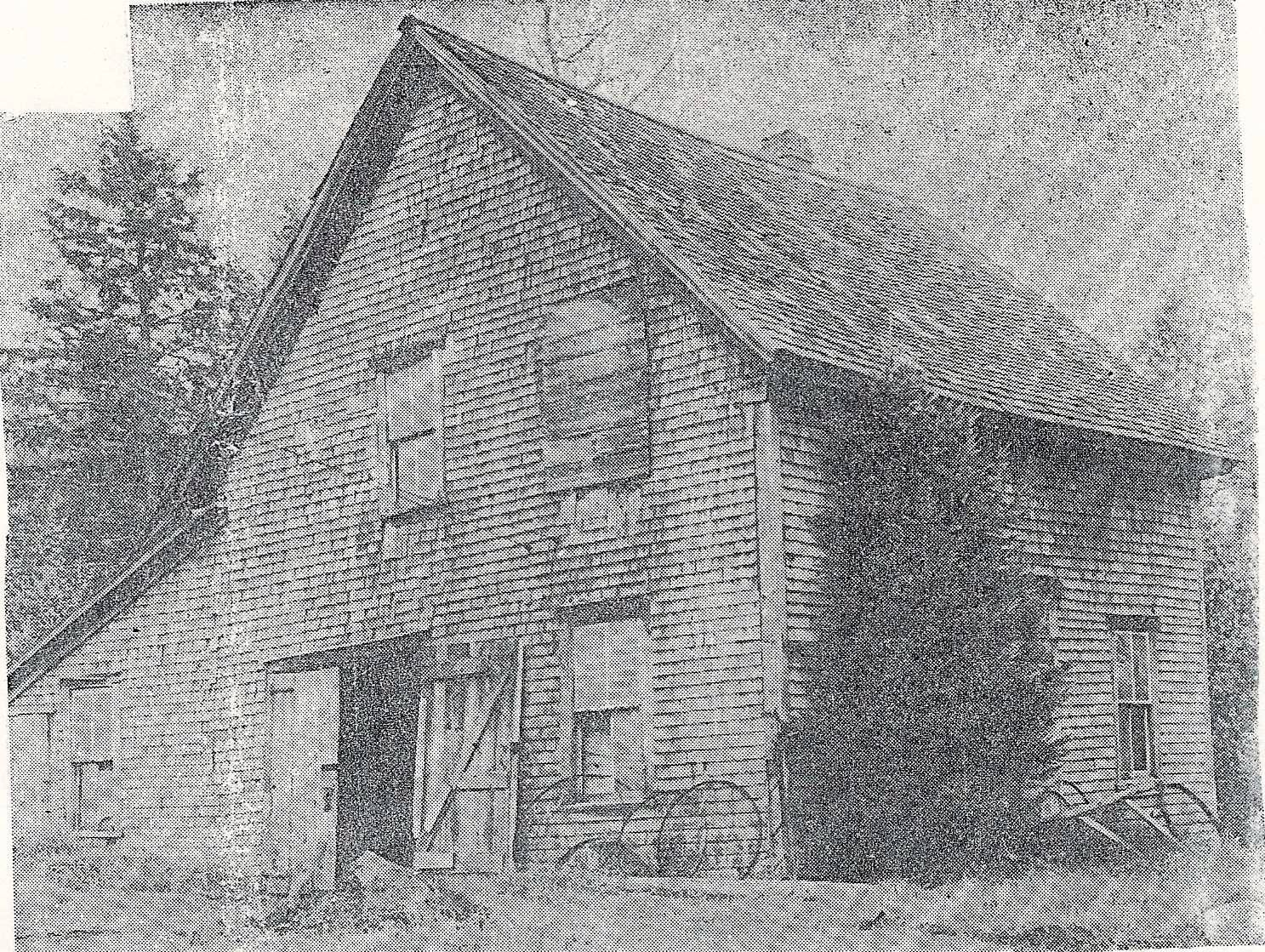
Freeland Minard's blacksmith shop

Other enterprises included a service station operated by Leroy Webber, a carpentry business owned by Timothy Rhodes, and the tannery and carding mill run by Forman Morton and his sons.

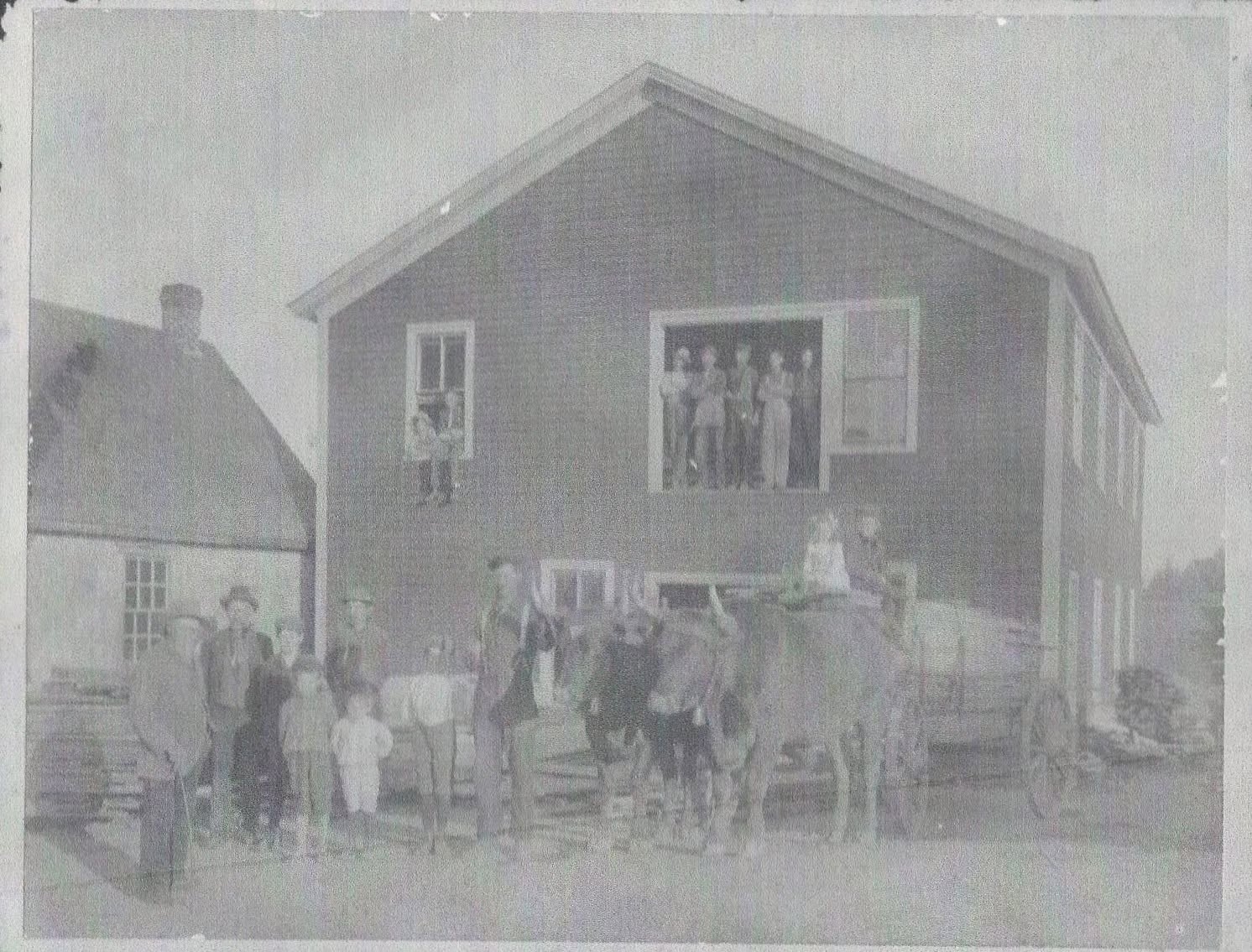
Timothy Rhodes Carpentry Shop. Hamm's Blacksmith Shop is on the left.

The community's cooperage industry became especially prominent during the early twentieth century. Operated by L. S. DeLong and Maynard DeLong, the business employed skilled coopers and produced barrels used throughout the region. Meanwhile, funeral services expanded under the management of several local proprietors, including members of the Langille family, who maintained the service for many decades.

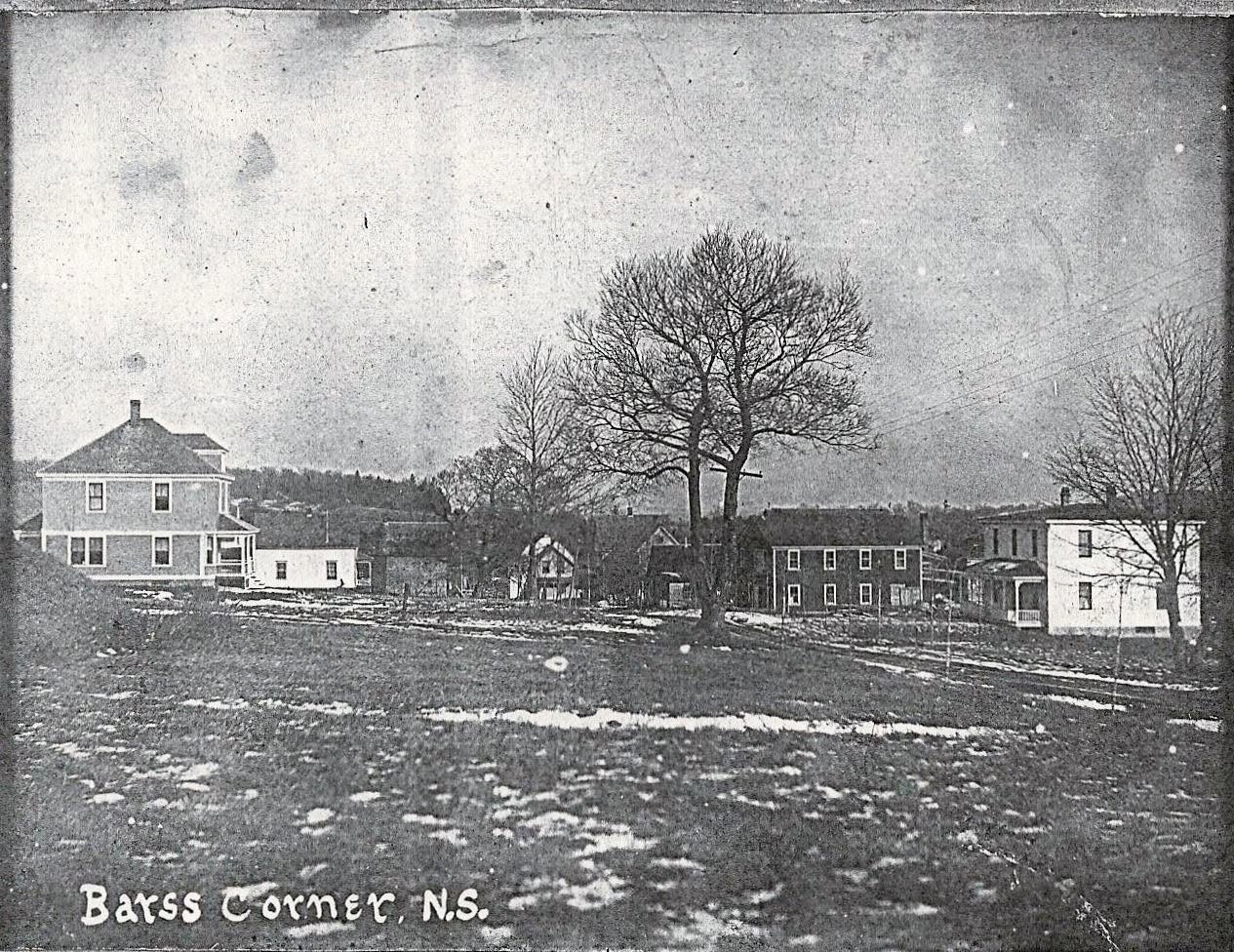
A view of the early houses of Barss Corner sometime around 1910. All if not most of these homes are still standing.

Communications and utilities gradually arrived in Barss Corner. Telephone service was extended from New Germany in 1894, with Maggie Barss reportedly becoming the first local subscriber. Electricity followed in 1921, when the Electric Light Company of Barss Corner was formed and supplied power from Zwicker's Mill in New Germany. Street lighting was not introduced until 1971, marking a significant modernization of the community.

Transportation evolved considerably from the settlement's earliest days. The first routes were little more than footpaths and horse trails through the forest. Road construction and maintenance depended heavily on local labour, with residents contributing work and equipment through the system of Statute Labour. Road conditions improved gradually, and by the 1930s provincial authorities had begun paving major highways. The main route through Barss Corner was paved from New Germany to the Stanburne Road in 1957.

Religious and educational institutions also played important roles in community life. Religious services were initially held in private homes before moving to a local schoolhouse. A Baptist church, built in 1842, remains one of the community's oldest surviving buildings. A Methodist church, established in 1900, later served as a community recreation hall before its eventual demolition.

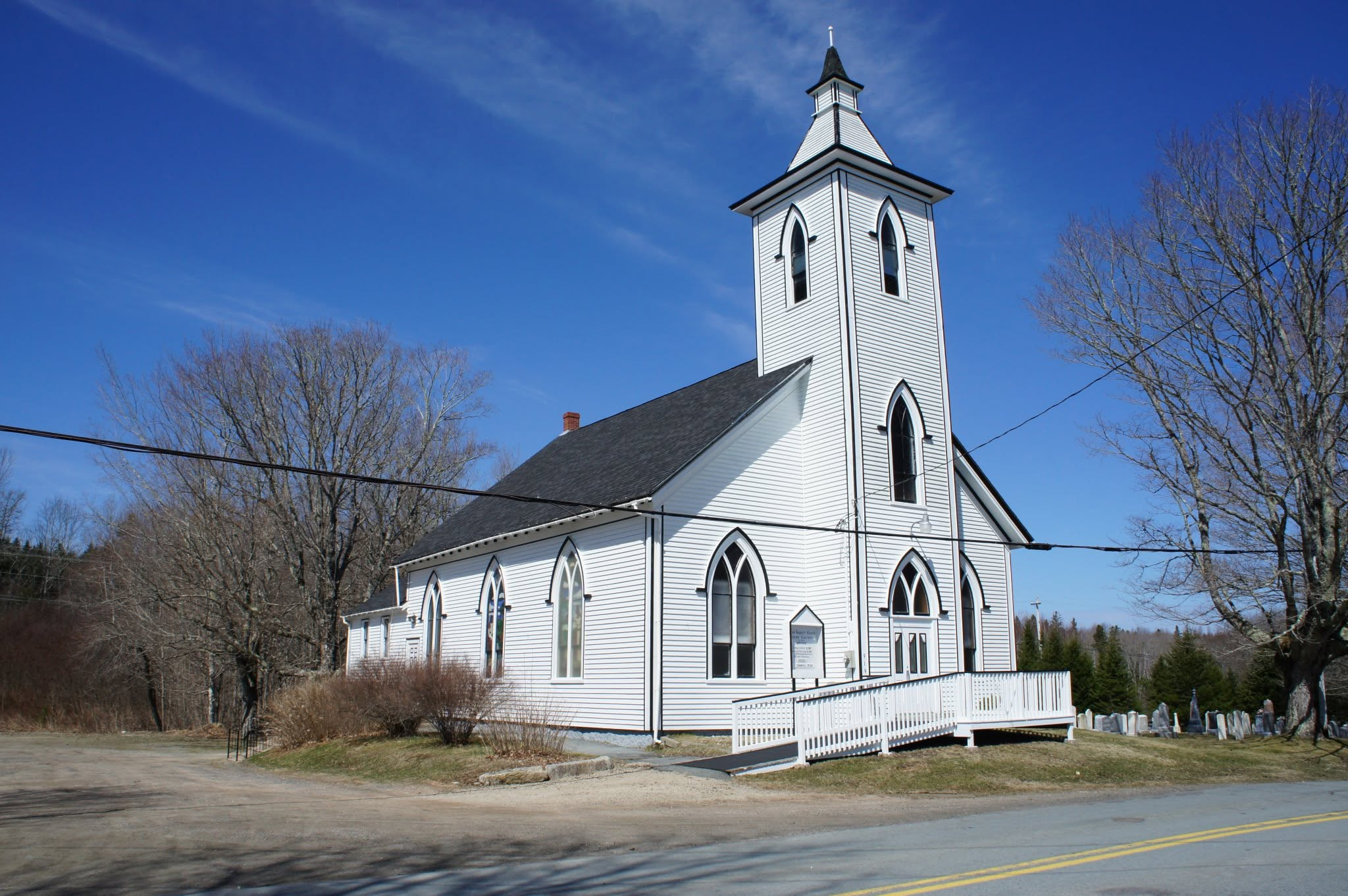
A present day photo of the Barss Corner Baptist Church, built in 1842.

Education began in a small school at the base of Hawkesworth Hill before a larger schoolhouse was constructed in 1873. As enrolment increased, additional facilities were built, and the school eventually became known as Barss Corner School Section No. 37. Secondary students began attending New Germany Rural High School in 1954, and by 1965 elementary students had also been consolidated into schools in New Germany, leading to the closure of the local school.

Postal services have been available in the community since 1854, initially through a "Way Office" operated from a private residence. A dedicated post office was officially opened on 10 July 1967.

== Present Day ==
Barss Corner continues to be a predominantly residential and agricultural community surrounded by forests, lakes, and farmland. While many of the historic industries described in the community's early history—such as cooperages, tanneries, and blacksmith shops—have disappeared, the area retains a strong rural character and remains closely connected to nearby centres such as New Germany, Bridgewater, and Mahone Bay.

=== Community Services ===
Several longstanding institutions continue to serve the area:

- The Barss Corner Post Office remains an important local service point. In 2024, the community received its first custom Canada Post postmark, a recognition of the community's identity and heritage. A CBC report noted that the post office serves approximately 500 addresses in the surrounding area.
- The Barss Corner Community Hall remains a local gathering place and is listed as a notable community facility.
- The historic Barss Corner Baptist Church, first established in 1842, continues to serve the community according to local historical records.

=== Business and Industry ===
==== Delong Farms ====
One of the best-known agricultural businesses connected with the Barss Corner - New Germany area and has become particularly well known throughout Nova Scotia and Atlantic Canada for its Christmas wreaths, eggs, produce, and Christmas tree products. The farm was established and currently operates in its original location on Barss Corner Road.

==== Maders General Store ====
First established in 1908, also continues to serve Barss Corner and surrounding communities.

=== Economy and Lifestyle ===
Today, most residents rely on a mix of farming, forestry, trades, small businesses, and employment in nearby communities. The area has also attracted people seeking a quieter rural lifestyle while remaining within commuting distance of Bridgewater. The presence of cottage properties, recreational land, and vacation rentals reflects a growing interest in the area's natural setting and outdoor recreation opportunities.

=== Geography and Recreation ===
The community is situated in the inland South Shore region and is surrounded by lakes, brooks, trails, and woodland. Outdoor activities such as hiking, ATV riding, hunting, fishing, paddling, and snowmobiling remain popular. Nearby communities such as New Germany provide additional commercial and recreational services.
