= Cornwall, Nova Scotia =

Cornwall may refer to the following places in Nova Scotia, Canada, all in Lunenburg County:

- Lower New Cornwall, Nova Scotia
- Middle New Cornwall, Nova Scotia
- Upper New Cornwall, Nova Scotia
