= Bayport, Nova Scotia =

Community in Nova Scotia, Canada

Bayport
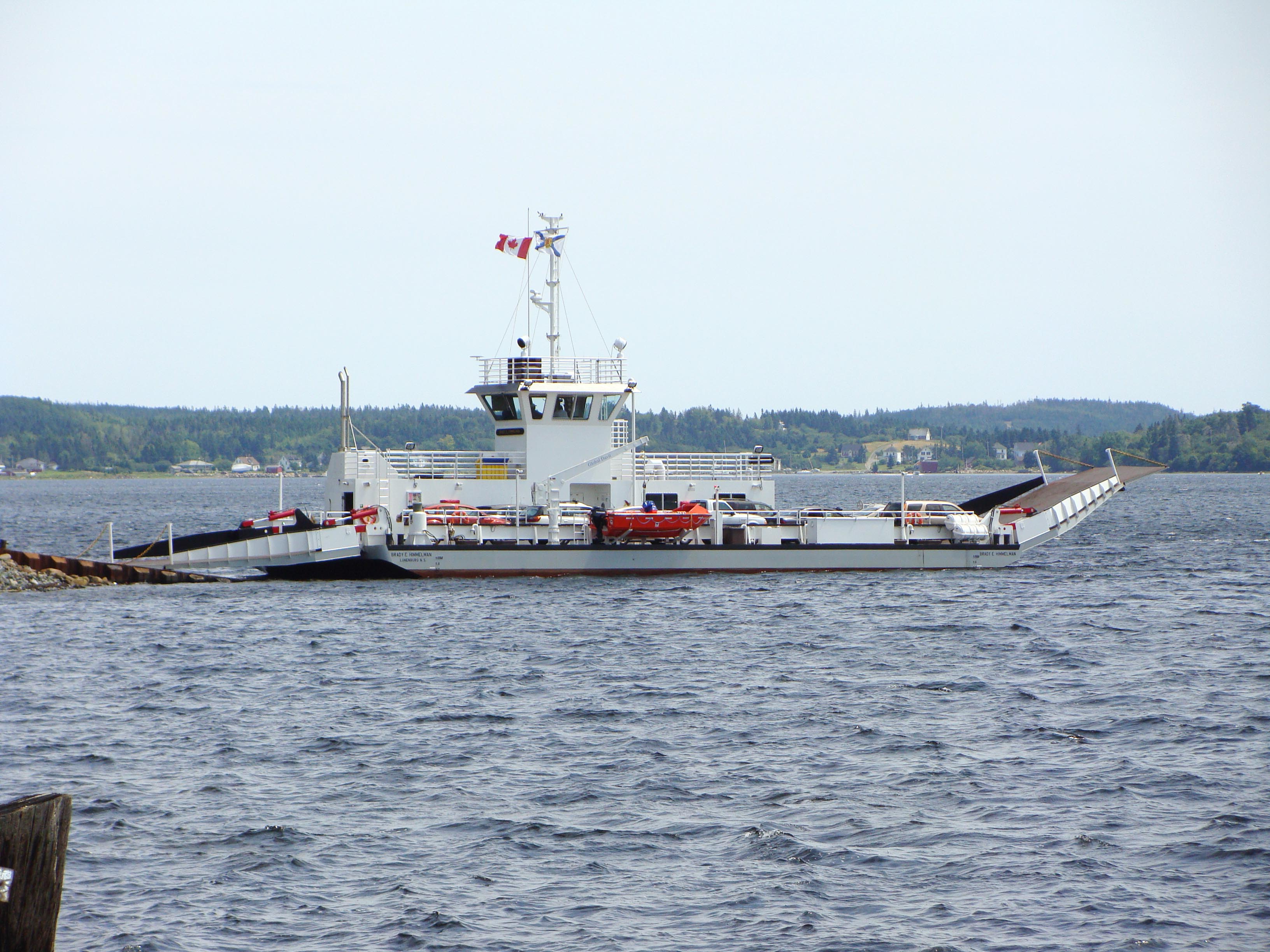
- The River Can't Divide

- Location of Bayport, Nova Scotia
- Coordinates: 44°18′54.02″N 64°18′8.25″W
- Country: Canada
- Province: Nova Scotia
- Municipality: Lunenburg Municipality
- Elevation: 0 m (0 ft)
- Highest elevation: 119 m (390 ft)
- Lowest elevation: 0 m (0 ft)
- Time zone: UTC-4 (AST)
  - Summer (DST): UTC-3 (ADT)
- Canadian Postal code: B0J 2X0
- Area code: 902
- Telephone Exchanges: 764, 766
- NTS Map: 021A08
- GNBC Code: CBFUW
- Website: www.riverport.org

Bayport is a small community in the Canadian province of Nova Scotia. The community is located in the Lunenburg Municipal District in Lunenburg County.
