= Clearland, Nova Scotia =

Community in Nova Scotia, Canada

Coordinates: 44°28′53.19″N 64°24′34.49″W

Clearland in Nova Scotia

Clearland is a community in the Canadian province of Nova Scotia, located in the Lunenburg Municipal District in Lunenburg County.
