= Oakland, Nova Scotia =

Community in Nova Scotia, Canada

Coordinates: 44°27′2.05″N 64°21′53.81″W

Oakland in Nova Scotia

Oakland is a community in the Canadian province of Nova Scotia, located in the Lunenburg Municipal District in Lunenburg County.
