= Farmville, Nova Scotia =

Community in Nova Scotia, Canada

Coordinates: 44°27′57.63″N 64°28′6.46″W

Farmville in Nova Scotia

Farmville is a community in the Canadian province of Nova Scotia, located in the Lunenburg Municipal District in Lunenburg County.
