= Mill Road, Nova Scotia =

Community in Nova Scotia, Canada

Coordinates: 44°47′19.17″N 64°26′39.32″W

Mill Road in Nova Scotia

Mill Road is a community in the Canadian province of Nova Scotia, located in the Chester Municipal District in Lunenburg County.
