= Dublin Shore, Nova Scotia =

Community in Nova Scotia, Canada

Coordinates: 44°16′3.49″N 64°22′4.01″W

Dublin Shore in Nova Scotia

Dublin Shore is a community in the Canadian province of Nova Scotia, located in the Lunenburg Municipal District in Lunenburg County. It takes its name from Dublin, Ireland.
