= Martins Brook =

Community in Nova Scotia, Canada

Coordinates: 44°24′23.62″N 64°20′37.18″W

Martin's Brook in Nova Scotia

Martins Brook is a community in the Canadian province of Nova Scotia, located along NS Highway # 3 East of the UNESCO World Heritage Town of Lunenburg, Nova Scotia in the Municipality of the District of Lunenburg in Lunenburg County. It is a popular boating and cottage destination and is home to the Krispy Kraut Sauerkraut plant and the Old Black Forest Restaurant along with a number of Bed and Breakfast and cottage rental operations.
