= New Cumberland, Nova Scotia =

Community in Nova Scotia, Canada

Coordinates: 44°17′7.21″N 64°27′0.33″W

New Cumberland in Nova Scotia

New Cumberland is a community in the Canadian province of Nova Scotia, located in the Lunenburg Municipal District in Lunenburg County.
