= Elmwood, Nova Scotia =

Community in Nova Scotia, Canada

Coordinates: 44°34′48.38″N 64°37′45.5″W

Elmwood in Nova Scotia

Elmwood is a community in the Canadian province of Nova Scotia, located in the Lunenburg Municipal District in Lunenburg County.
