= Conquerall Mills, Nova Scotia =

Community in Nova Scotia, Canada

Coordinates: 44°18′14.22″N 64°31′26.68″W

Conquerall Mills in Nova Scotia

Conquerall Mills is a community in the Canadian province of Nova Scotia, located in the Lunenburg Municipal District in Lunenburg County. Conquerall Mills is dominated by Fancy Lake which is the source for the picturesque Petite Rivière. Fancy Lake is home to small mouth bass and the invasive species of chain pickerel. There are warnings against fishing the endangered Atlantic whitefish which are rumoured to exist in the Fancy Lake/Petite Rivière system. The community is 125 kilometers southwest of Halifax.

== Parks ==
- Fancy Lake Provincial Park
- Oakhill Pines Camp & Trailer Park Limited
- Bridgewater Parks & Recreation
