= Aaldersville, Nova Scotia =

Community in Nova Scotia, Canada

Coordinates: 44°48′51″N 64°30′8″W

Aldersville in Nova Scotia

Aaldersville, formerly Aldersville, is a community in the Canadian province of Nova Scotia, located in the Chester Municipal District in Lunenburg County.
