= Upper Branch, Nova Scotia =

Community in Nova Scotia, Canada

Coordinates: 44°27′22.79″N 64°41′2.64″W

Upper Branch in Nova Scotia

Upper Branch is a community in the Canadian province of Nova Scotia, located in the Lunenburg Municipal District in Lunenburg County.
