= Indian Path, Nova Scotia =

- Community
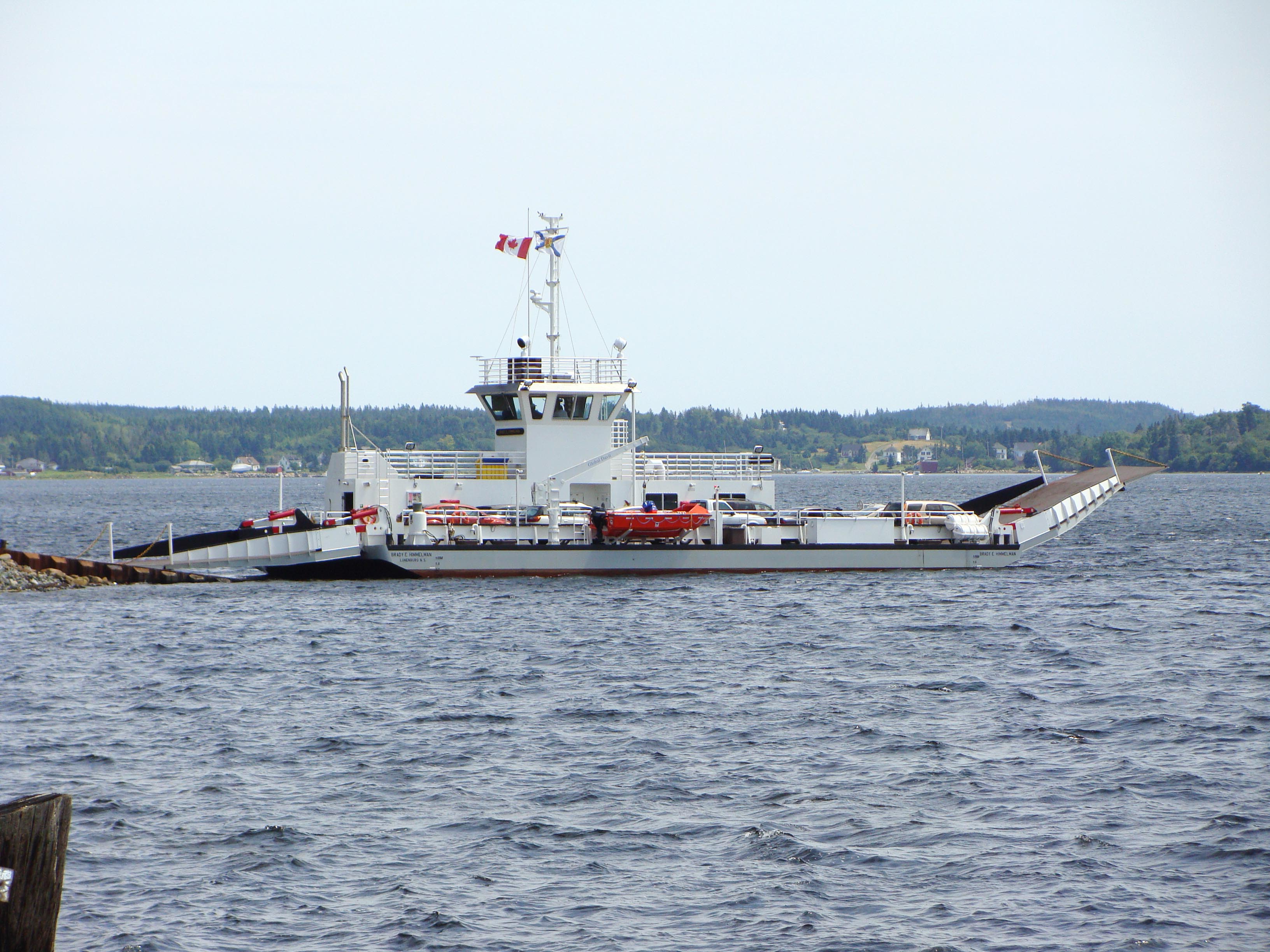
- The River Can't Divide

- Location within Nova Scotia
- Coordinates: 44°18′39.87″N 64°20′41.51″W
- Country: Canada
- Province: Nova Scotia
- Municipality: Lunenburg Municipality
- Elevation: 0 m (0 ft)
- Highest elevation: 119 m (390 ft)
- Lowest elevation: 0 m (0 ft)
- Time zone: UTC-4 (AST)
  - Summer (DST): UTC-3 (ADT)
- Canadian Postal code: B0J 2W0
- Area code: 902
- Telephone Exchanges: 764, 766
- NTS Map: 021A08
- GNBC Code: CBFUW
- Website: www.riverport.org

Indian Path is part of the Riverport District, a community in the Canadian province of Nova Scotia, in Lunenburg County.

Much of the rural infrastructure for Bayport is centered in Riverport, Nova Scotia. This includes the Riverport & District Fire Department, Riverport & District Community Center, Riverport Community School and Riverport Post Office. Rose Bay General Store offers a wide range of locally based goods and services.
