= Rhodes Corner, Nova Scotia =

Community in Nova Scotia, Canada

Coordinates: 44°22′42.28″N 64°25′7.55″W

Rhodes Corner in Nova Scotia

Rhodes Corner is a community in the Canadian province of Nova Scotia, located in the Lunenburg Municipal District in Lunenburg County.
