= East Clifford, Nova Scotia =

Community in Nova Scotia, Canada

Coordinates: 44°25′40.65″N 64°43′48.88″W

East Clifford in Nova Scotia

East Clifford is a community in the Canadian province of Nova Scotia, located in the Lunenburg Municipal District in Lunenburg County.
