= Lake William, Nova Scotia =

Locality in Nova Scotia, Canada

Coordinates: 44°34′55.75″N 64°39′55.9″W

Lake William in Nova Scotia

Lake William is a locality in the Canadian province of Nova Scotia, located in the Lunenburg Municipal District in Lunenburg County. The community is situated near Lake William, which is part of the LaHave River watershed.
