= Bakers Settlement, Nova Scotia =

Community in Nova Scotia, Canada

Coordinates: 44°23′52.72″N 64°40′50.28″W

Bakers Settlement in Nova Scotia

Bakers Settlement is a community in the Canadian province of Nova Scotia, located in the Lunenburg Municipal District in Lunenburg County.
