= Sweetland, Nova Scotia =

Community in Nova Scotia, Canada

Coordinates: 44°28′4.91″N 64°31′24.21″W

Sweetland in Nova Scotia

Sweetland is a community in the Canadian province of Nova Scotia, located in the Lunenburg Municipal District in Lunenburg County.
