= Leville, Nova Scotia =

Community in Nova Scotia, Canada

Coordinates: 44°44′50.87″N 64°25′18.37″W

Leville in Nova Scotia

Leville is a community in the Canadian province of Nova Scotia, located in the Chester Municipal District in Lunenburg County.
