= Barrys Corner, Nova Scotia =

Community in Nova Scotia, Canada

Coordinates: 44°25′46.16″N 64°28′35.04″W

Barrys Corner in Nova Scotia

Barrys Corner is a community in the Canadian province of Nova Scotia, located in the Lunenburg Municipal District in Lunenburg County.
