= Mount Pleasant, Lunenburg County, Nova Scotia =

Community in Nova Scotia, Canada

Coordinates: 44°17′4.33″N 64°25′35.67″W

Mount Pleasant in Nova Scotia

Mount Pleasant is a community in the Canadian province of Nova Scotia, located in the Lunenburg Municipal District in Lunenburg County.
