= Pentz, Nova Scotia =

Community in Nova Scotia, Canada

Coordinates: 44°18′2.72″N 64°22′54.99″W

Pentz in Nova Scotia

Pentz is a rural community in the Canadian province of Nova Scotia, located in the Lunenburg Municipal District in Lunenburg County.
