= Farmington, Lunenburg, Nova Scotia =

Community in Nova Scotia, Canada

Coordinates: 44°36′47.74″N 64°39′54.35″W

Farmington in Nova Scotia

Farmington is a community in the Canadian province of Nova Scotia, located in the Lunenburg Municipal District in Lunenburg County.

Climate data for Farmington, 1981−2010 normals, extremes 1982−present
Month	Jan	Feb	Mar	Apr	May	Jun	Jul	Aug	Sep	Oct	Nov	Dec	Year
Record high °C (°F)	17 (63)	16.5 (61.7)	26.2 (79.2)	27 (81)	33.5 (92.3)	33.5 (92.3)	33.5 (92.3)	35.0 (95.0)	33.2 (91.8)	27 (81)	20 (68)	18 (64)	35.0 (95.0)
Mean daily maximum °C (°F)	−1.1 (30.0)	−0.5 (31.1)	3.3 (37.9)	9.2 (48.6)	16.4 (61.5)	21.4 (70.5)	24.6 (76.3)	24.1 (75.4)	19.6 (67.3)	13.2 (55.8)	7.2 (45.0)	1.4 (34.5)	11.6 (52.9)
Daily mean °C (°F)	−5.4 (22.3)	−4.9 (23.2)	−1.0 (30.2)	4.7 (40.5)	10.8 (51.4)	15.9 (60.6)	19.1 (66.4)	18.9 (66.0)	14.6 (58.3)	8.8 (47.8)	3.4 (38.1)	−2.5 (27.5)	6.9 (44.4)
Mean daily minimum °C (°F)	−9.6 (14.7)	−9.2 (15.4)	−5.3 (22.5)	.1 (32.2)	5.3 (41.5)	10.3 (50.5)	13.6 (56.5)	13.5 (56.3)	9.6 (49.3)	4.3 (39.7)	−0.3 (31.5)	−6.4 (20.5)	2.2 (36.0)
Record low °C (°F)	−29 (−20)	−28.5 (−19.3)	−21.5 (−6.7)	−14.5 (5.9)	−3 (27)	1.5 (34.7)	6.0 (42.8)	3.5 (38.3)	−1.5 (29.3)	−5 (23)	−13.5 (7.7)	−22.5 (−8.5)	−29 (−20)
Average precipitation mm (inches)	129.2 (5.09)	109.9 (4.33)	133.8 (5.27)	107.8 (4.24)	108.4 (4.27)	99.2 (3.91)	91 (3.6)	88.9 (3.50)	114.3 (4.50)	112 (4.4)	148 (5.8)	132.9 (5.23)	1,375.3 (54.15)
Average rainfall mm (inches)	75.6 (2.98)	65.1 (2.56)	93.1 (3.67)	92.1 (3.63)	107.6 (4.24)	99.2 (3.91)	91 (3.6)	88.9 (3.50)	114.3 (4.50)	111.4 (4.39)	133.4 (5.25)	90.8 (3.57)	1,162.4 (45.76)
Average snowfall cm (inches)	53.6 (21.1)	44.8 (17.6)	40.7 (16.0)	15.7 (6.2)	.7 (0.3)	0 (0)	0 (0)	0 (0)	0 (0)	.6 (0.2)	14.6 (5.7)	42.1 (16.6)	212.9 (83.8)
Average precipitation days (≥ 0.2 mm)	15.9	12.6	13.2	13.1	13.9	12.1	10.6	9.7	10.1	11.3	14.9	15.7	152.9
Average rainy days (≥ 0.2 mm)	6.9	5.7	8.4	11.1	13.8	12.1	10.6	9.7	10.1	11.1	12.5	8.1	119.9
Average snowy days (≥ 0.2 cm)	11.1	9.1	6.7	3.2	0.24	0.0	0.0	0.0	0.0	0.25	3.5	9.7	43.6
Source: Environment Canada
