= West Clifford, Nova Scotia =

Community in Nova Scotia, Canada

Coordinates: 44°24′39.51″N 64°43′27.25″W

West Clifford in Nova Scotia

West Clifford is a community in the Canadian province of Nova Scotia, located in the Lunenburg Municipal District in Lunenburg County.
