= Lapland, Nova Scotia =

Community in Nova Scotia, Canada

Coordinates: 44°17′40.16″N 64°40′49.66″W

Lapland in Nova Scotia

Lapland is a community in the Canadian province of Nova Scotia. It is located in the Lunenburg Municipal District in Lunenburg County.
