= Stonehurst =

Stonehurst may refer to:

== Settlements ==
- Stonehurst, Nova Scotia, Canada
- Stonehurst East, New Jersey, United States
- Stonehurst West, New Jersey, United States

== Structures ==
- Robert Treat Paine Estate, or Stonehurst, in Waltham, Massachusetts, listed on the U.S. National Register of Historic Places (NRHP)
- Stonehurst (Grosse Pointe Shores, Michigan), a Gilded Age mansion
- Stonehurst (Ripley, Ohio), on the NRHP-listed in Brown County

== Other uses ==
- Stonehurst Family Farm and Motor Museum, Mountsorrel, Leicestershire, England
- Stonehurst Historic Preservation Overlay Zone, Los Angeles, California, U.S.
