= Front Centre, Nova Scotia =

Community in Nova Scotia, Canada

Coordinates: 44°22′55.75″N 64°20′56.96″W

Front Centre n Nova Scotia

Front Centre is a community in the Canadian province of Nova Scotia, located in the Lunenburg Municipal District in Lunenburg County.
