= Sunnybrook, Nova Scotia =

Community in Nova Scotia, Canada

Coordinates: 44°25′13.72″N 64°21′2.21″W

Sunnybrook in Nova Scotia

Sunnybrook is a community in the Canadian province of Nova Scotia, located in the Lunenburg Municipal District in Lunenburg County.
