= Upper Chelsea, Nova Scotia =

Community in Nova Scotia, Canada

Coordinates: 44°20′13.15″N 64°46′4.22″W

Upper Chelsea in Nova Scotia

Upper Chelsea is a community in the Canadian province of Nova Scotia, located in the Lunenburg Municipal District in Lunenburg County.
