= Tanners Settlement =

Community in Nova Scotia, Canada

Coordinates: 44°21′18.56″N 64°21′59.38″W

Tanners Settlement in Nova Scotia

Tanners Settlement is a community in the Canadian province of Nova Scotia, located in the Lunenburg Municipal District in Lunenburg County. It is northeast of Grimm's Settlement and east of Cosman's Meadow.
