= Meisners Section, Nova Scotia =

Community in Nova Scotia, Canada

Coordinates: 44°35′49.45″N 64°46′0.51″W

Meisners Section in Nova Scotia

Meisners Section is a community in the Canadian province of Nova Scotia, located in the Lunenburg Municipal District in Lunenburg County.
