= Parkdale, Lunenburg, Nova Scotia =

Community in Nova Scotia, Canada

Coordinates: 44°39′26.27″N 64°38′13.31″W

Parkdale in Nova Scotia

Parkdale is a community in the Canadian province of Nova Scotia, located in the Lunenburg Municipal District in Lunenburg County.
