= Crouses Settlement, Nova Scotia =

Community in Nova Scotia, Canada

Coordinates: 44°20′44.53″N 64°24′28.93″W

Crouses Settlement in Nova Scotia

Crouses Settlement is a community in the Canadian province of Nova Scotia, located in the Lunenburg Municipal District in Lunenburg County.
