= Auburndale, Nova Scotia =

Community in Nova Scotia, Canada

Coordinates: 44°24′18.77″N 64°35′33.87″W

Auburndale in Nova Scotia

Auburndale is a community in the Canadian province of Nova Scotia, located in the Lunenburg Municipal District in Lunenburg County. Located approximately 1.5 km northwest of Bridgewater, Nova Scotia, Auburndale was formerly named Branch.
