= Laconia, Nova Scotia =

Community in Nova Scotia, Canada

Coordinates: 44°20′10.06″N 64°38′26.91″W

Laconia in Nova Scotia

Laconia is a community in the Canadian province of Nova Scotia, located in the Lunenburg Municipal District in Lunenburg County.

Laconia is located about 13.5 south west of Bridgewater, NS.

Local family names include Eisnor and Eisenhauer as evidenced by the records of Laconia Road cemetery.
