= List of shipwrecks in March 1823 =

The list of shipwrecks in March 1823 includes some ships sunk, foundered, grounded, or otherwise lost during the month of March 1823.

== 1 March ==
List of shipwrecks: 1 March 1823
Ship	State	Description
John	(United Kingdom of Great Britain and Ireland) Colony of Jamaica	The schooner was captured by a privateer while on a voyage from Kingston, Colony of Jamaica, to St. Jago de Cuba, Cuba. She was set afire and sunk.
Mad Bull	(United Kingdom of Great Britain and Ireland) Colony of Jamaica	The schooner was lost.
Simon Taylor	(United Kingdom of Great Britain and Ireland) Colony of Jamaica	The sloop was lost.

== 2 March ==
List of shipwrecks: 2 March 1823
Ship	State	Description
Aid	United Kingdom	The ship capsized and sank in the North Sea off Aldeburgh, Suffolk. Her crew were rescued. She was on a voyage from Peterhead, Aberdeenshire, to London.
Charles	United Kingdom	The ship foundered in the Irish Sea off Point Lynas, Anglesey. She was on a voyage from Wexford to Liverpool, Lancashire.
David	United Kingdom	The ship departed from Liverpool on this date. No further trace, presumed foundered with the loss of all hands.
Eleanor	United Kingdom	The ship departed from Galway for Liverpool. No further trace, presumed foundered with the loss of all hands.
Friends	United Kingdom	The ship was wrecked near Easton Bavents, Suffolk, with the loss of all but her captain.
John and Mary	United Kingdom	The ship departed from Penzance, Cornwall, for Liverpool. No further trace, presumed foundered with the loss of all hands.

== 3 March ==
List of shipwrecks: 3 March 1823
Ship	State	Description
Betsey	United Kingdom	The brig was driven ashore near Cardross, Argyllshire. Betsey was refloated in early April and taken in to dock for repairs.
Eliza	France	The ship was driven ashore and wrecked on the north coast of Guernsey, Channel Islands. Her crew and a passenger were rescued.
Ellen	United Kingdom	The ship was driven ashore on the coast of Cumberland. She had been refloated by 17 March and taken in to Ravenglass.
Headley	United Kingdom	The ship was lost on Corton Sand, in the North Sea off Lowestoft, Suffolk. Hew crew were rescued.
Lady Arabella	United Kingdom	The ship was driven ashore at Greenock, Renfrewshire. She was on a voyage from Killybegs, County Donegal, to Glasgow, Renfrewshire. Lady Arabella was refloated on 5 March.
Lady Kinnaird	United Kingdom	The ship ran aground on the Hollywood Bank, in the Irish Sea off the coast of County Antrim. She was refloated on 17 March and resumed her voyage.
Lighthouse Yacht	United Kingdom	The sloop was driven ashore and wrecked south of Ayr with the loss of two lives. She was on a voyage from Sligo to Greenock.
Margaret Bogle	United Kingdom	The ship was driven ashore at Port Glasgow, Renfrewshire. She was on a voyage from Greenock to Demerara Margaret Bogle was refloated in early April and docked for repair.
Prince of Wales	United Kingdom	The sloop was lost on the Trinity Sand, in the River Humber with the loss of all hands. She was on a voyage from London to Gainsborough, Lincolnshire.
St. Pierre	France	The ship foundered in the Bay of Biscay off the mouth of the Garonne. Her crew survived. She was on a voyage from Jersey, Channel Islands, to Bordeaux, Gironde.
Thames	United Kingdom	The ship was severely damaged at Port Glasgow.
Union	United Kingdom	The ship was run down and sunk in the North Sea off Great Yarmouth, Norfolk. Her crew survived. She was on a voyage from Newcastle upon Tyne, Northumberland, to Southwold, Suffolk.
Veracity	United Kingdom	The ship was driven ashore at Spurn Point, Yorkshire.

== 4 March ==
List of shipwrecks: 4 March 1823
Ship	State	Description
Acadia	(United Kingdom of Great Britain and Ireland) Trinidad	The ship was lost on Anegada, Virgin Islands. She was on a voyage from Puerto Rico to Trinidad.
Albatross	United Kingdom	The ship collided with Isabella and Dorothy (United Kingdom) in the North Sea off Newcastle upon Tyne, Northumberland, and sank with the loss of her captain.
Amelia	United Kingdom	The brig foundered in the Irish Sea south of the Isle of Man. She was on a voyage from Limerick to the Clyde.
Ann	United Kingdom	The ship was wrecked on the North Bank, in Liverpool Bay. Her crew were rescued. She was on a voyage from Sligo to Liverpool, Lancashire.
Commerce	United Kingdom	The ship was wrecked on the Dunbar Sand. She was on a voyage from Bideford to Dartmouth, Devon.
Ellen	United Kingdom	The ship was driven ashore at Ravenglass, Cumberland. Her crew were rescued. She was on a voyage from Whitehaven, Cumberland, to Dublin. Ellen was refloated on 17 March and taken in to Ravenglass.
Fanny	United Kingdom	The ship foundered on Carnarvon Bay. Her crew were rescued. She was on a voyage from Wicklow to Dublin.
Four Johns	United Kingdom	The ship was driven ashore at Winterton-on-Sea, Norfolk. Her crew were rescued. She was on a voyage from London to Leeds, Yorkshire Four Johns was refloated on 20 March and taken in to Great Yarmouth, Norfolk, for repairs.
Henrietta	United Kingdom	The schooner was driven ashore in Carnarvon Bay. Her crew were rescued.
Hippolyta	United Kingdom	The ship was driven ashore and wrecked at Boulogne, Pas-de-Calais, France, with the loss of a crew member. She was on a voyage from Havana, Cuba, to London.
Hope	United Kingdom	The ship was driven ashore and wrecked in Carnarvon Bay. She was on a voyage from London to Liverpool.
Hunter	United Kingdom	The ship was driven ashore at Liverpool. She was on a voyage from Liverpool to Charleston, South Carolina, United States. Hunter was refloated on 10 March and taken in to Liverpool.
Janet	United Kingdom	The ship was abandoned in the North Sea off the coast of Norfolk. She was on a voyage from St. Andrews, Fife, to London.
John & Harriet	United Kingdom	The ship was wrecked at Trusthorpe, Lincolnshire.
Johns	United Kingdom	The ship was driven ashore at Winterton-on-Sea. Her crew were rescued. She was on a voyage from Newcastle upon Tyne to London.
Marcelia	United Kingdom	The schooner foundered in the Irish Sea off Holywood, County Down.
Maria	United Kingdom	The ship was driven ashore in Bootle Bay and hogged. She was on a voyage from Liverpool to Africa Maria was refloated on 10 March and taken in to Liverpool.
Portsmouth	United Kingdom	The smack was driven ashore at Portsmouth, Hampshire. She was refloated on 6 March.
Prince of Waterloo	United Kingdom	The ship was driven ashore near "Selkar", Cumberland. Her crew were rescued. She was on a voyage from Dublin to Whitehaven.
Recovery	United Kingdom	The ship was driven onto the Kettle Bottom Sand, in the North Sea off the coast of Norfolk. She consequently foundered. Her crew were rescued. Recovery was on a voyage from Newcastle upon Tyne to London.
Sarah	United Kingdom	The ship was driven ashore and wrecked at Boulogne with the loss of four of her crew. She was on a voyage from Cork to London.
Sussex	United Kingdom	The brig foundered in the North Sea off Lowestoft, Suffolk, with the loss of all hands.
Thomas	United Kingdom	The ship was driven ashore at Boulogne. Her crew were rescued. She was on a voyage from Limerick to London.
Wilhelm	Netherlands	The ship was driven ashore and wrecked at Dunkirk, Nord, France. She was on a voyage from Liverpool to Antwerp.
Wilton	United Kingdom	The brig was driven ashore at "Laughill". She was on a voyage from Limerick to Liverpool.

== 5 March ==
List of shipwrecks: 5 March 1823
Ship	State	Description
Endeavour	United Kingdom	The sloop foundered in the Irish Sea off Ballintrae, County Antrim. Her crew and a passenger were rescued. She was on a voyage from Sligo to Glasgow, Renfrewshire.
Guardian	United Kingdom	The collier was abandoned off the Dutch coast. Her crew were rescued by the fishing smack Ebenezer (United Kingdom).
Jane	United Kingdom	The sloop was driven ashore and wrecked at Walney Island, Lancashire, with the loss of three crew.
Jenny	United Kingdom	The collier was abandoned off the Dutch coast. Her crew were rescued by the fishing smack Ebenezer (United Kingdom).
Liveley	United Kingdom	The sloop was driven ashore and wrecked at Holyhead, Anglesey. She was on a voyage from Poole, Dorset, to Liverpool, Lancashire.
Norfolk	United Kingdom	The brig foundered in the North Sea off Flamborough Head, Yorkshire, with the loss of one of her six crew. She was on a voyage from King's Lynn, Norfolk, to Newcastle upon Tyne.
Rufford	United Kingdom	The ship was lost in the Broad Fourteens. Her crew were rescued by Sociable (United Kingdom).
Sisters	United Kingdom	The ship was driven ashore near Étaples, Pas-de-Calais, France. She was on a voyage from Neath, Glamorgan, to London. Sisters was refloated in late April and taken in to Falmouth, Cornwall.
Two Sisters	United Kingdom	The ship foundered in the North Sea with the loss of all hands. She was on a voyage from Alnmouth, Northumberland, to Hull, Yorkshire.
Union	United Kingdom	The schooner was driven ashore near Holyhead.
Young William	United Kingdom	The ship was driven ashore and wrecked near Boulogne, Pas-de-Calais, France, with the loss of a crew member. She was on a voyage from Weymouth, Dorset, to London.

== 6 March ==
List of shipwrecks: 6 March 1823
Ship	State	Description
Félicité	France	The ship was driven ashore and wrecked at Calais. She was on a voyage from Morlaix, Finistère to Newcastle upon Tyne, Northumberland, United Kingdom.
Grist	United Kingdom	The ship foundered in the North Sea off Dunkerque, Nord, France. Her crew were rescued by a pilot boat.
Hannah	United Kingdom	The ship was driven ashore at Liverpool, Lancashire.
Sidus	United Kingdom	The brig was driven ashore near Calais. She was on a voyage from Dartmouth, Devon, to London.

== 7 March ==
List of shipwrecks: 7 March 1823
Ship	State	Description
Guardian	United Kingdom	The collier was abandoned in the North Sea off the Dutch coast. Her crew were rescued by the fishing smack Ebenezer (United Kingdom).
Jenny	United Kingdom	The collier was abandoned in the North Sea off the Dutch coast. Her crew were rescued by the fishing smack Ebenezer (United Kingdom).
Liveley	United Kingdom	The ship was driven ashore and damaged at Sunderland, County Durham. She was on a voyage from Sunderland to Aberdeen. Lively was refloated on 11 March.
Nelson	United Kingdom	The ship was driven ashore and wrecked at Dublin. Her crew were rescued.
Pallas	United Kingdom	The ship was driven ashore and wrecked at Tynemouth, Northumberland, with the loss of her captain.
Three Friends	United Kingdom	The ship was driven ashore at Harwich, Essex. She was on a voyage from Great Yarmouth, Norfolk, to Faversham, Kent. Three Friends was later refloated and taken in to Harwich.

== 8 March ==
List of shipwrecks: 8 March 1823
Ship	State	Description
Belle Alliance	(United Kingdom of Great Britain and Ireland) Guernsey	The ship was lost on the Goodwin Sands, Kent. Her crew were rescued. She was on a voyage from Antwerp, Netherlands, to Guernsey.

== 9 March ==
List of shipwrecks: 9 March 1823
Ship	State	Description
Mary Jemima	United Kingdom	The ship was dismasted in the English Channel. She was towed in to Newhaven, Sussex, and beached. Mary Jemima was on a voyage from Swanage, Dorset, to London.
Palermo	United Kingdom	The ship was sighted off the Île de Ré, Morbihan on this date. She subsequently foundered. Palermo was on a voyage from the Charente to London.
Sybil	United States	The ship was wrecked at Saint-Michel, 8 leagues (24 nautical miles (44 km) west of the Île de Batz, Finistère), France, with the loss of thirteen of her seventeen crew. She was on a voyage from Le Havre, Seine Maritime, France, to Charleston, South Carolina.
Tamer	United Kingdom	The ship was driven ashore and wrecked at Breaksea Point, Glamorgan, with the loss of her captain. She was on a voyage from Exeter, Devon, to Newport, Monmouthshire.

== 10 March ==
List of shipwrecks: 10 March 1823
Ship	State	Description
Liverpool	(United Kingdom of Great Britain and Ireland) Jamaica	The ship was lost south of Cape Henry, Virginia, United States. She was on a voyage from Jamaica to Norfolk, Virginia.
Vine	United Kingdom	The sloop was driven ashore near the Cow and Calf, Pembrokeshire, and wrecked.

== 11 March ==
List of shipwrecks: 11 March 1823
Ship	State	Description
Apollo	United Kingdom	The ship was wrecked on the Gunfleet Sand, in the North Sea off Harwich, Essex. Her crew survived.
Eliza Piggott	United States	The ship was in collision with another vessel and was abandoned by her crew. She was on a voyage from New York to Madeira.
Fanny	United Kingdom	The ship foundered in Carnarvon Bay. Her crew were rescued. She was on a voyage from Wicklow to Dublin.
Friendship	United Kingdom	The ship was wrecked near Bowmore, Islay, Inner Hebrides. She was on a voyage from Killybegs, County Donegal, to Rothesay, Bute.

== 12 March ==
List of shipwrecks: 12 March 1823
Ship	State	Description
Etoile du Nord	France	The ship sprang a leak and foundered in the Irish Sea off the coast of the Isle of Man. Her crew survived. She was on a voyage from Liverpool, Lancashire, United Kingdom, to Le Havre, Seine-Inférieure.
Hoop	Netherlands	The ship was driven ashore and wrecked at Marbella, Spain. She was on a voyage from Cette, Hérault, France, to Amsterdam, North Holland.
Julia	United States	The ship was wrecked in the Bay of Honduras. She was on a voyage from Antigua to New Orleans, Louisiana.
Nautilus	United Kingdom	The ship was wrecked on São Miguel, Azores, Portugal. Her crew were rescued.
Regulus	United Kingdom	The ship was wrecked at Île Bourbon.

== 15 March ==
List of shipwrecks: 15 March 1823
Ship	State	Description
Gazelle	United States	The ship was driven ashore at Cape Henry, Virginia. She was on a voyage from New Orleans, Louisiana, to Richmond, Virginia.
Neptune	United Kingdom	The ship was beached at Blyth, Northumberland. Her crew were rescued.
Oliver	United States	The ship was wrecked on "Cape Marys". She was on a voyage from Jamaica to Philadelphia, Pennsylvania.

== 16 March ==
List of shipwrecks: 16 March 1823
Ship	State	Description
Eleanor	United Kingdom	The ship was driven ashore and damaged on the coast of Sierra Leone. She was refloated with assistance from HMS Driver (Royal Navy).
Mary	United Kingdom	The ship was driven ashore at Barnahard Point. She was on a voyage from Limerick to Glasgow, Renfrewshire. Mary was refloated on 18 March.

== 18 March ==
List of shipwrecks: 18 March 1823
Ship	State	Description
Heworth	United Kingdom	The ship was driven ashore at the Cape of Good Hope. She was on a voyage from London to Algoa Bay.

== 19 March ==
List of shipwrecks: 19 March 1823
Ship	State	Description
Eliza	United Kingdom	The schooner ran aground on the Herd Sand, in the North Sea off North Shields, County Durham. Her crew were rescued by the North Shields Lifeboat. Eliza was on a voyage from Sunderland, County Durham, to Aberdeen. She was refloated on 26 March and taken in to North Shields.
Mariner	(United Kingdom of Great Britain and Ireland) New South Wales	The ship departed from New South Wales for Rio de Janeiro, Brazil. No further trace, presumed foundered in the Pacific Ocean with the loss of all hands.

== 20 March ==
List of shipwrecks: 20 March 1823
Ship	State	Description
Cornwall	United Kingdom	The ship became stuck on a bank off Cape Aden during a voyage from Mokha to England with a cargo of coffee. She sustained considerable damage but reached Bombay on 25 May for repairs.
Fortune	United Kingdom	The ship was driven ashore east of Palermo Sicily. She was on a voyage from Palermo to Rio de Janeiro, Brazil. Fortune was declared a total loss.
Juno	United Kingdom	The ship was driven ashore between Penzance and Newlyn, Cornwall. She was on a voyage from London to Penzance. Juno was later refloated.
La Gata	Pirates	The schooner was captured and sunk in the Caribbean Sea off the Isle of Pines, Cuba, by HMS Grecian (Royal Navy) with the loss of 30 of her 100 crew.

== 21 March ==
List of shipwrecks: 21 March 1823
Ship	State	Description
Atlas	United States	The ship was wrecked near "Kijk Dam", Netherlands. She was on a voyage from New Orleans, Louisiana, to Amsterdam, North Holland, Netherlands.
Empress	United States	The ship was driven ashore on Long Island, New York. She was on a voyage from Charleston, South Carolina, to New York City.
Harriet	United Kingdom	The ship struck a rock off St David's Head, Pembrokeshire, and consequently foundered with the loss of one life. She was on a voyage from Dublin to Barbados and Trinidad.
Leviathan	United Kingdom	The ship departed from St. Domingo for London. No further trace, presumed foundered with the loss of all hands.
Sankt Carlo	Russia	The brig was driven ashore and wrecked at Malta.
Sky Lark	United Kingdom	The ship was driven ashore at Littlehampton, Sussex. She was on a voyage from Beaumaris, Anglesey to Littlehampton. Sky Lark was later refloated and taken in to Littlehampton.
Strever	Netherlands	The ship was driven ashore and wrecked near Boulogne, Pas-de-Calais, France. She was on a voyage from Surinam to Amsterdam, North Holland.

== 22 March ==
List of shipwrecks: 22 March 1823
Ship	State	Description
Harriet	United Kingdom	The ship struck a rock and foundered in the Irish Sea off St David's Head, Pembrokeshire, with the loss of one life. She was on a voyage from Dublin to Barbados.
Hero	United States	The ship was driven ashore at Cape May, New Jersey. She was on a voyage from Newburne, Nova Scotia, British North America, to New York.
Warren	United Kingdom	The ship capsized at St. Mary's, Isles of Scilly.

== 24 March ==
List of shipwrecks: 24 March 1823
Ship	State	Description
Abraham and Moses	United Kingdom	The ship foundered in the North Sea off Aldeburgh, Suffolk. Her crew were rescued.
Frau Maria	Grand Duchy of Oldenburg	The schooner foundered in the North Sea off the mouth of the Elbe. Her crew survived. She was on a voyage from Elbing to Cuxhaven.
Ranger	United States	The schooner was abandoned in the Atlantic Ocean. Her crew were rescued by Diamond (United Kingdom). She was on a voyage from New York to Pernambuco, Brazil.

== 25 March ==
List of shipwrecks: 25 March 1823
Ship	State	Description
Abraham & Moses	United Kingdom	The ship foundered off Bawdsey, Suffolk. Her crew were rescued.

== 26 March ==
List of shipwrecks: 26 March 1823
Ship	State	Description
Alert	United Kingdom	The ship struck the West Mouse Rock, in the Irish Sea off The Skerries, Anglesey and foundered with the loss of 134 of the 160 people on board. She was on a voyage from Dublin to Liverpool, Lancashire.
Eleanor & Catherine	United Kingdom	The ship was wrecked near Kidwelly, Carmarthenshire. Her crew were rescued. She was on a voyage from Newport, Monmouthshire, to Kidwelly.

== 27 March ==
List of shipwrecks: 27 March 1823
Ship	State	Description
George	United Kingdom	The ship was lost at Lagavulin, Isle of Islay. She was on a voyage from Coleraine, County Antrim, to Tobermory, Isle of Mull.

== 29 March ==
List of shipwrecks: 29 March 1823
Ship	State	Description
Elizabeth	United Kingdom	The ship departed from Bristol, Gloucestershire, for the Clyde. No further trace, presumed foundered with the loss of all hands.
Hope	United Kingdom	The sloop was wrecked on the Gruggy Rock, in the River Severn. Her crew survived. She was on a voyage from Lydney, Gloucestershire, to Exeter, Devon.
Renown	(United Kingdom of Great Britain and Ireland) Guernsey	The ship foundered off the Smalls Lighthouse. Her three crew survived. She was on a voyage from Liverpool, Lancashire, to Jersey, Channel Islands.

== 30 March ==
List of shipwrecks: 30 March 1823
Ship	State	Description
Argo	United States	The ship was wrecked whilst on a voyage from Portland, Oregon, to "Martanza".
Weltberger	Bremen	The ship was driven ashore and wrecked in the Rappahannock River with the loss of all on board. She was on a voyage from Bremen to Baltimore, Maryland, United States.

== Unknown date ==
List of shipwrecks: Unknown date 1823
Ship	State	Description
Almira	United States	The two-masted schooner was abandoned in the Atlantic Ocean on or before 13 March.
Anne	United Kingdom	The ship was driven ashore near Liverpool, Lancashire, on or before 10 March. She was on a voyage from Dublin to Whitehaven, Cumberland. Anne was refloated on 15 March.
Antelope	United Kingdom	The ship was wrecked on Brier Island, Nova Scotia, British North America. Her crew were rescued. She was on a voyage from Saint John, New Brunswick, British North America, to the West Indies.
Britannia	United Kingdom	The ship was driven ashore and wrecked near Marsala, Sicily. She was on a voyage from Odesa to Bristol, Gloucestershire.
Corn Planter	United States	The ship was driven ashore on Long Island, New York.
Diana	Kingdom of Sardinia	The ship struck a rock and sank between "Gallon Island" and the "Malse". She was on a voyage from "Quillea" to Lima, Peru.
Eagle	United States	The ship was driven ashore on the Dutch coast. She was on a voyage from Baltimore, Maryland, to Amsterdam, North Holland, Netherlands.
Fantaisie	France	The ship was wrecked at Île Bourbon.
Jane	United States	The ship was abandoned in the Atlantic Ocean. She was on a voyage from Portsmouth, New Hampshire, to Havana, Cuba.
Polly	United Kingdom	The ship foundered in the Irish Sea off Aberystwyth, Cardiganshire, on or before 5 March.
Marianne	United Kingdom	The ship ran aground at Gravesend, Kent. She was on a voyage from London to the Cape of Good Hope. Marianne was refloated and put into Blackwall, Middlesex.
Narford Lake	United Kingdom	The ship foundered in the North Sea off the coast of Yorkshire. She was on a voyage from King's Lynn, Norfolk, to Newcastle upon Tyne, Northumberland.
Sarah Ann	(United Kingdom of Great Britain and Ireland) Bahamas	The schooner was wrecked on Green Key, Bahamas, in early March. She was on a voyage from a Cuban port to Nassau, Bahamas.
Union	United Kingdom	The ship was driven ashore and wrecked at Sandy Hook, New Jersey, United States.
Upstalboom	Kingdom of Hanover	The ship was wrecked at La Tremblade, Charente-Maritime, France. She was on a voyage from Emden to Bordeaux, Gironde, France.
Upton	United States	The brig was abandoned in the Atlantic Ocean on or before 14 March.
