= First Peninsula, Nova Scotia =

Community in Nova Scotia, Canada

Coordinates: 44°22′58.84″N 64°18′55.22″W

First Peninsula in Nova Scotia

First Peninsula is a community in the Canadian province of Nova Scotia, located in the Lunenburg Municipal District in Lunenburg County.
