= Union Square, Nova Scotia =

Community in Nova Scotia, Canada

Coordinates: 44°33′9.21″N 64°38′18.26″W

Union Square in Nova Scotia

Union Square is a community in the Canadian province of Nova Scotia, located in the Lunenburg Municipal District in Lunenburg County.
