= Back Centre, Nova Scotia =

Community in Nova Scotia, Canada

Coordinates: 44°22′6.72″N 64°21′32.18″W

Back Centre in Nova Scotia

Back Centre is a community in the Canadian province of Nova Scotia, located in the Lunenburg Municipal District in Lunenburg County.
