= Oakhill, Nova Scotia =

Community in Nova Scotia, Canada

Coordinates: 44°23′48.3″N 64°29′52.75″W

Oakhill in Nova Scotia

Oakhill (formerly Oak Hill) is a community in the Canadian province of Nova Scotia, located in the Lunenburg Municipal District in Lunenburg County.
