= New Canada, Nova Scotia =

Community in Nova Scotia, Canada

Coordinates: 44°28′41.51″N 64°40′49.97″W

New Canada in Nova Scotia

New Canada is a community in the Canadian province of Nova Scotia, located in the Lunenburg Municipal District in Lunenburg County.
