= Pine Grove, Lunenburg County =

Community in Nova Scotia, Canada

Coordinates: 44°44′50.87″N 64°25′18.37″W

Pine Grove in Nova Scotia

Pine Grove is a community in the Canadian province of Nova Scotia, located in the Lunenburg Municipal District in Lunenburg County.
