= Midville Branch, Nova Scotia =

Community in Nova Scotia, Canada

Coordinates: 44°25′25.42″N 64°38′13.31″W

Midville Branch in Nova Scotia

Midville Branch is a community in the Canadian province of Nova Scotia, located in the Lunenburg Municipal District in Lunenburg County.
