= Hemford, Nova Scotia =

Community in Nova Scotia, Canada

Coordinates: 44°30′32.38″N 64°47′20.84″W

Hemford in Nova Scotia

Hemford is a community in the Canadian province of Nova Scotia, located in the Municipality of the District of Lunenburg in Lunenburg County.
