= Lake Centre, Nova Scotia =

Community in Nova Scotia, Canada

Coordinates: 44°18′57.56″N 64°28′56.51″W

Lake Centre in Nova Scotia

Lake Centre is a community in the Canadian province of Nova Scotia, located in the Lunenburg Municipal District in Lunenburg County.
