= First South, Nova Scotia =

Community in Nova Scotia, Canada

Coordinates: 44°21′59.43″N 64°20′51.24″W

First South in Nova Scotia

First South is a community in the Canadian province of Nova Scotia, located in the Lunenburg Municipal District in Lunenburg County. The community boasts of two churches, the Grace Lutheran Church and the First South United Church, as well as a cemetery.
