= Stanley Section, Nova Scotia =

Community in Nova Scotia, Canada

Coordinates: 44°30′58.82″N 64°44′16.69″W

Stanley Section in Nova Scotia

Stanley Section is a community in the Canadian province of Nova Scotia, located in the Lunenburg Municipal District in Lunenburg County.
