= Walden, Nova Scotia =

Community in Nova Scotia, Canada

Coordinates: 44°35′57.81″N 64°32′1.29″W

Walden in Nova Scotia

Walden is a community in the Canadian province of Nova Scotia, located in the Lunenburg Municipal District in Lunenburg County on the shore of the LaHave River.
