= Nineveh, Nova Scotia =

Nineveh, Nova Scotia may refer to the following Canadian communities:

- Nineveh, Lunenburg, Nova Scotia
- Nineveh, an unincorporated place in the Municipality of the County of Victoria
