= New Elm, Nova Scotia =

Community in Nova Scotia, Canada

Coordinates: 44°24′17.44″N 64°49′59.67″W

New Elm in Nova Scotia

New Elm is a community in the Canadian province of Nova Scotia, located in the Lunenburg Municipal District in Lunenburg County.
