= Upper New Cornwall, Nova Scotia =

Community in Nova Scotia, Canada

Coordinates: 44°31′19.09″N 64°34′12.3″W

Upper New Cornwall in Nova Scotia

Upper New Cornwall is a community in the Canadian province of Nova Scotia, located in the Lunenburg Municipal District in Lunenburg County.
