= West Northfield, Nova Scotia =

Community in Nova Scotia, Canada

Coordinates: 44°26′27.64″N 64°34′38.87″W

West Northfield in Nova Scotia

West Northfield is a community in the Canadian province of Nova Scotia, located in the Lunenburg Municipal District of Lunenburg County. It lies in a drumlinized area along the LaHave River. The loam-textured podzolic soils tend to be strongly acidic and stony. A favorable drainage and moisture-holding capacity makes them suitable for agriculture and forestry. A Christmas tree industry has developed around the community in recent years.
