= Newburne, Nova Scotia =

Community in Nova Scotia, Canada

Coordinates: 44°35′44.6″N 64°35′52.41″W

Newburne in Nova Scotia

Newburne is a community in the Canadian province of Nova Scotia, located in the Lunenburg Municipal District in Lunenburg County.
