= Martins Point, Nova Scotia =

Human settlement in Nova Scotia, Canada

Coordinates: 44°28′51.54″N 64°19′15.12″W

Martins Point is a small community in the Canadian province of Nova Scotia. There are various waterfronts down the many side roads of Martins Point. The two other communities surrounding Martins Point are Western Shore and Martins River. Some of the shops located there are The Whirlyjig Factory and the Sunflower Shop. Martin's Point is also home to Bigfoot Systems Inc, manufacturers of plastic footing forms used with construction tubes.
