= Gold River, Nova Scotia =

Community in Nova Scotia, Canada

Gold River
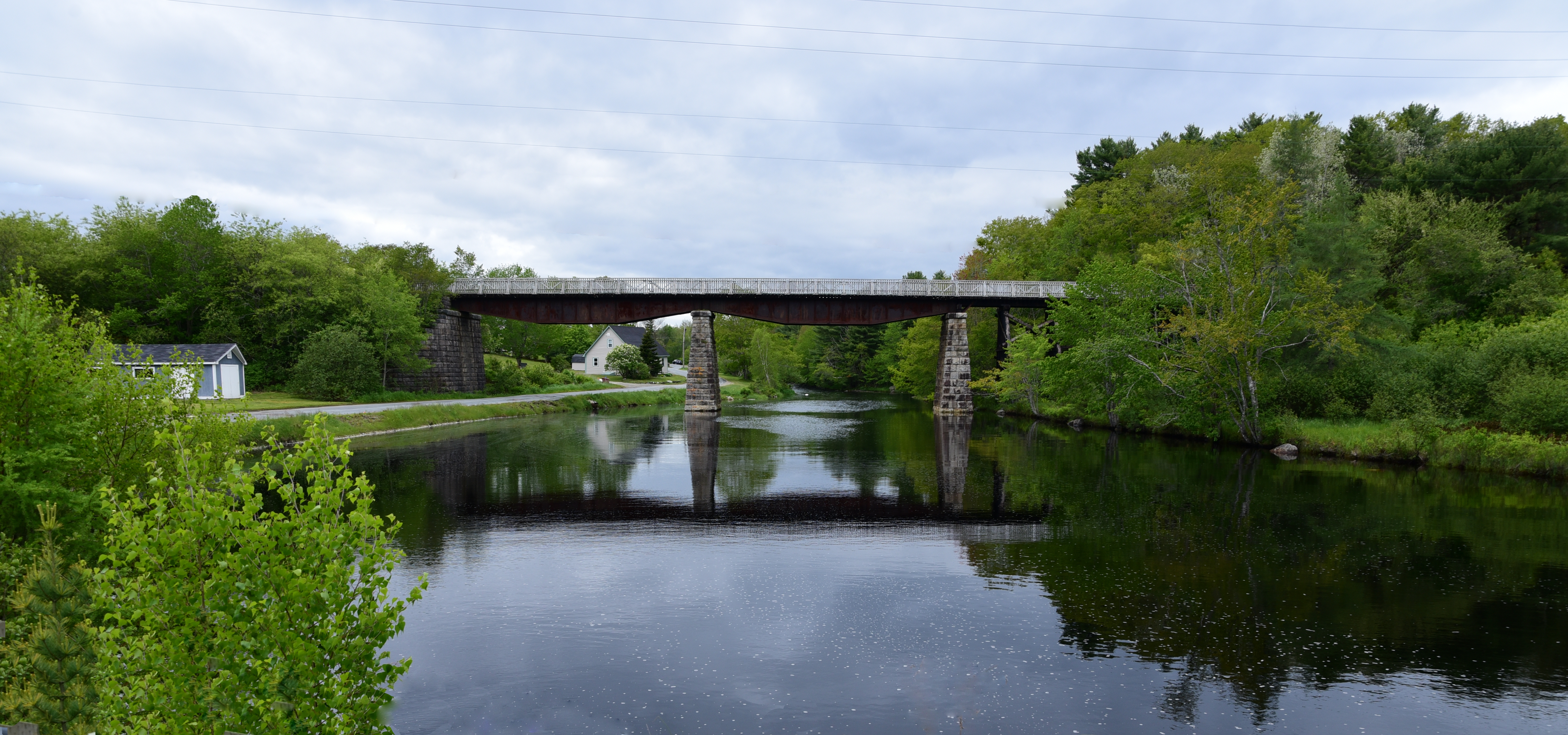

- Location of Gold River in Nova Scotia
- Coordinates: 44°32′42″N 64°19′07″W
- Country: Canada
- Province: Nova Scotia
- County: Lunenburg County.
- Municipality: Chester Municipal District
- Elevation: 17 m (56 ft)
- Time zone: UTC-4 (AST)
  - Summer (DST): UTC-3 (ADT)
- Postal code: B0J 1J0
- Area code: 902
- NTS Map: 021A09
- GNBC Code: CAGYN
- Part of a series about Places in Nova Scotia

Gold River is a community in the Canadian province of Nova Scotia, located in the Chester Municipal District. It is located near the mouth of the same-named river, where it empties into Mahone Bay.

Gold was discovered in Gold River, Lunenburg County, in September 1861. The area produced 7610 ounces of gold between 1881 and 1940.

Mining took place only sporadically from 1861–86 but then became more continuous from 1886–1915. The area was then quiet for 15 years until it started up again in the 1930s. In 1931 the Lacey Gold Mining Syndicate dewatered an old 25-m shaft in the Lacey Fissure, which was discovered in 1910 and became one of the most productive mines in Gold River. A 25-ton ball mill was installed in 1935 but operations were discontinued because too much gold was being lost to the tailings. The mill equipment was not effective enough and the mine shut down.

In 1937 the Lacey Mine was taken over by the Government of Nova Scotia. There was installed a 25-ton ball mill. The mine was operated under the Mine Apprentice Project, a government program that trained about 500 men in "modern hard rock mining techniques" in 1937–40.

The outbreak of World War II brought the program to an end. But it appeared, Canadian miners played important role in the war. They dug many kilometers of tunnels into the Rock of Gibraltar to protect Allied soldiers from bombardment. The Rock of Gibraltar was strategically important for controlling access to the Mediterranean Sea, and Canada’s experience with hard rock mining was key to holding it.

Gold River is well-known as a good river for panning gold because the gold-bearing quartz vein systems actually outcrop within and adjacent to the river. Gold River erodes some of the rock that hosts the gold and carries it downriver until the gold settles out. While it was not used extensively at Gold River, panning was a simple but effective small-scale method of extracting gold at many historical sites.

In 2019, Gold River Marina was voted by the people as ″2019 Best Marine Services in the Chester Municipality."
