= Nineveh, Lunenburg, Nova Scotia =

Community in Nova Scotia, Canada

Coordinates: 44°28′39.52″N 64°48′15.23″W

Nineveh in Nova Scotia

Nineveh is a community in the Canadian province of Nova Scotia, located in the Lunenburg Municipal District in Lunenburg County. It was named for the ancient city of Nineveh.
