= Fraxville, Nova Scotia =

Community in Nova Scotia, Canada

Coordinates: 44°46′0.21″N 64°34′1.18″W

Fraxville in Nova Scotia

Fraxville is a community in the Canadian province of Nova Scotia, located in the Lunenburg Municipal District in Lunenburg County.
