= Schnares Crossing =

Locality in Nova Scotia, Canada

Coordinates: 44°24′14.68″N 64°20′35.02″W

Schnares Crossing in Nova Scotia

Schnares Crossing is a locality in the Canadian province of Nova Scotia, located in Lunenburg County.
