= Glengarry, Lunenburg, Nova Scotia =

Locality in Nova Scotia, Canada

Coordinates: 44°43′5.95″N 64°26′44.26″W

Glengarry in Nova Scotia

Glengarry is a locality in the Canadian province of Nova Scotia, located in the Lunenburg Municipal District in Lunenburg County.
