= Lake Ramsay, Nova Scotia =

Community in Nova Scotia, Canada

Coordinates: 44°45′11.94″N 64°30′42.81″W

Lake Ramsay in Nova Scotia

Lake Ramsay is a community in the Canadian province of Nova Scotia, located in the Chester Municipal District in Lunenburg County. It is located to the north of a body of water also named Lake Ramsay.
