= Masons Beach =

Community in Nova Scotia

Coordinates: 44°21′46.84″N 64°20′14.32″W

Mason's Beach in Nova Scotia

Masons Beach is a community in the Canadian province of Nova Scotia, located in Lunenburg County.
