= Dolores Claiborne (film) =

1995 film by Taylor Hackford

- Theatrical release poster
- Directed by: Taylor Hackford
- Screenplay by: Tony Gilroy
- Based on: Dolores Claiborne by Stephen King
- Produced by: Charles Mulvehill; Taylor Hackford
- Starring: Kathy Bates; Jennifer Jason Leigh; David Strathairn; John C. Reilly; Eric Bogosian; Christopher Plummer
- Cinematography: Gabriel Beristain
- Edited by: Mark Warner
- Music by: Danny Elfman
- Production company: Castle Rock Entertainment
- Distributed by: Columbia Pictures
- Release date: March 24, 1995 (United States)
- Running time: 131 minutes
- Country: United States
- Language: English
- Budget: $13 million
- Box office: $46.4 million (estimated)

Dolores Claiborne is a 1995 American psychological thriller drama film directed by Taylor Hackford and starring Kathy Bates and Jennifer Jason Leigh, with David Strathairn, John C. Reilly, Eric Bogosian, and Christopher Plummer in supporting roles. The screenplay by Tony Gilroy is based on the 1992 novel by Stephen King. The plot focuses on the strained relationship between a mother and her daughter, largely told through flashbacks. The daughter arrives to her remote hometown on a Maine island, where her mother has been accused of murdering the elderly woman for whom she had long been a caregiver and companion.

Dolores Claiborne was the second major King film adaptation to star Bates in a leading role after Misery (1990) five years earlier. The film was shot in Nova Scotia in 1994. It was released by Columbia Pictures on March 24, 1995 and was a sleeper hit, grossing $46.4 million worldwide on a $13 million budget and little promotion. The film was well received by critics, with the performances of Bates and Leigh being especially praised. Bates stated in a retrospective interview that her performance as the titular Dolores was her favorite performance she had ever given. In 2014, Time named the film among the top 10 greatest Stephen King film adaptations.

== Plot ==
In 1995, Dolores Claiborne works as a domestic servant for her elderly, partially paralyzed employer, Vera Donovan, in her mansion in the fictional Little Tall Island in Maine. One afternoon, the pair struggles, and Vera falls down the stairs. After ransacking the kitchen, Dolores is caught by the mailman, who sees her standing over Vera with a rolling pin. Vera dies, and the local police begin a murder investigation.

Dolores's estranged daughter, Selena St. George, a successful NYC journalist with depression and substance abuse, reluctantly arrives in town to support her mother, despite her own doubts about Dolores's innocence. Dolores insists she did not kill Vera, but the entire town has little trust, as they still believe she killed her husband, Joe St. George, 18 years earlier. Detective John Mackey, who was the chief detective in his murder case, is determined to put Dolores away for life.

In 1975, Joe was an abusive alcoholic who, unbeknownst to Dolores, was also sexually abusing 14-year-old Selena. Dolores accepted the job cleaning for Vera to save money to pay for Selena's education. When Dolores discovered Selena was being molested, she went to the bank to withdraw the money so they could flee Joe's abuse, but found that Joe had stolen it. Dolores confided in Vera about the situation, and Vera implied that she had killed her own husband, who had supposedly died in a car wreck, which Vera engineered to look like an accident. Vera's confession formed a bond between the two women and convinced Dolores to take control of her own situation.

Dolores says Vera threw herself down the stairs in a suicide attempt, and then begged Dolores to put her out of her misery. Mackey refuses to believe her because Vera left her entire fortune to Dolores in a will, which Dolores knew nothing about. Dolores and Selena argue about Joe's abuse, which Selena has always strongly denied, and Selena storms out, leaving Dolores to fend for herself.

A flashback reveals that one day, when Dolores returned home from work, she told a drunken Joe she knew he stole the money and also that he molested Selena. She then provoked him into a rage and led him to fall down a well in their front yard, leaving him to die as he plunged to the stone bottom. Selena hears this story on a tape left for her by Dolores, who had foreseen her departure. While on the ferry, Selena suddenly uncovers a repressed memory of her father forcing her to touch him sexually. Realizing everything, Selena rushes back to Dolores, who is attending the coroner's inquest.

As Mackey makes a case to be sent to a grand jury in an attempt to indict Dolores for murder, Selena arrives and tells him he has no admissible evidence; he is only doing this because of his personal vendetta against Dolores, and that, despite an often stormy relationship, Vera and Dolores loved each other. Realizing that the case would likely end with either a dismissal or an acquittal, Mackey reluctantly drops the charges. Dolores and Selena reconcile on the ferry wharf before Selena returns home to NYC.

== Cast ==
- Kathy Bates as Dolores Claiborne
- Jennifer Jason Leigh as Selena St. George
  - Ellen Muth as Young Selena
  - Taffara Jessica Stella Murray as 5-year-old Selena
- Christopher Plummer as Detective John Mackey
- David Strathairn as Joe St. George
- Judy Parfitt as Vera Donovan
- John C. Reilly as Constable Frank Stamshaw
- Bob Gunton as Mr. Pease
- Eric Bogosian as Peter
- Roy Cooper as Magistrate
- Wayne Robson as Sammy Marchant
- Ruth Marshall as Secretary
- Weldon Allen as Bartender
- Tom Gallant as Searcher
- Kelly Burnett as Jack Donovan

== Production ==
Castle Rock Entertainment executive William Goldman approached screenwriter Tony Gilroy with the offer to adapt Stephen King's novel Dolores Claiborne, which had been the bestselling work of fiction of 1992. Initially, Gilroy was turned off by certain scenes, including when Vera hurls and smears excrement around her room, as well as by how the story was told: "It had some really fascinating angles, but the whole narrative was one long slog of a monologue from Dolores, which made it feel one dimensional, and to be honest, raw and unrevised." Nevertheless, he took on the project.

Hackford encountered several obstacles in pre-production, including neglecting to get Stephen King's approval for Gilroy's revised storyline, and a fruitless search for Little Tall Island, until a phone call with King clarified that it was a fictional location. Later, when Christopher Plummer was cast as Detective Mackey, Hackford became frustrated with his costume designer because Plummer, meant to look like a disheveled cop, kept appearing "like he'd just stepped out of the page of GQ Magazine." Plummer resolved the dilemma by using an eyebrow pencil to draw a large scar across his nose, which gave him a scraggy appearance.

Exterior shots of the St. George house were done in Blue Rocks, Nova Scotia, and to achieve the special effects of the solar eclipse which were done by The Computer Film Company in Los Angeles, without CGI technology, the house was disassembled and rebuilt on what was then the largest blue screen sound stage in existence at a hockey arena. Because the inexperienced effects company misunderstood the pricing from the storyboards, the sequence went 500% over budget.

The film's flashbacks were captured with Fuji film stock, which created bright, vivid pastels, and the present was filmed using cold, blue Kodak film, made harsher by desaturating the codec. In order to give tonal indications of erupting memories of buried trauma, Hackford created visual echoes of paintings by surrealist Belgian painter René Magritte, which appear in the scenes when Dolores breaks her window with an ax and when Selena gazes into the mirror on the ferryboat.

Dolores Claiborne was primarily filmed in Lunenburg, Mahone Bay, Chester, Stonehurst, and Digby, all in Nova Scotia, Canada during the spring and summer of 1994.

== Themes and interpretations ==
Though typically classified as a drama and psychological thriller, some critics, such as Roger Ebert, have classified Dolores Claiborne as a horror film, while it has also been identified as a Gothic romance.

=== Repression ===
Film theorist Kirsten Thompson identifies the film as a melodrama, "produced by the repression of specific traumas, [in this case] domestic violence and incest." According to Martha McCaughey and Neal King, the film's use of flashbacks suggest a specific narrative point of view when considering the film's themes of abuse and incest between Dolores, as well as Selena and Joe: "That all the flashbacks save one belong to Dolores tells us that not only are we watching her story; it also tells us of the unavailability of the past to Selena, and of the displacement and repression forced into play by the girl's experience of incest."

The flashback scene in which Selena recalls her father's forcing her to masturbate him on the ferry has been particularly noted by critics: "Here, Selena and the viewer alike come finally to see Joe's transgressions, and by implication, to understand the truth of Dolores's tale. Throughout this scene, the perspective offered by the camera remains firmly focused on the reactions of the victim of the sexual crime."

=== Feminist interpretation ===
Dolores Claiborne has been cited as a "self-consciously feminist" film that "combines the melodramatic impulse with the investigative structure of a noir crime thriller and a contemporary feminist consciousness." The film has also been read as an example of a maternal melodrama that features an "idealized mother-figure" who sacrifices the needs of her own for others. In the book Screening Genders, one scholar considered Dolores Claiborne and Stage Door (1937) to be the only "truly feminist" films made in Hollywood, in that they "don't cop out at the end."

Britt Hayes writes of the main character, "Through Dolores, King poignantly explores the way the world often forces women into a series of compromises, and the way those small compromises have a way of stacking up to an imposing height, backing us into a corner until we have no choice but to become bitches... a woman (a wife, a mother) is emotionally and physically abused to the point where she breaks and feels she has no other option [than to become a bitch]." The three main women in the story – Dolores, Selena, and Vera – each repeat, mutatis mutandis, "Sometimes being a bitch is the only thing a woman has left to hold on to."

== Reception ==
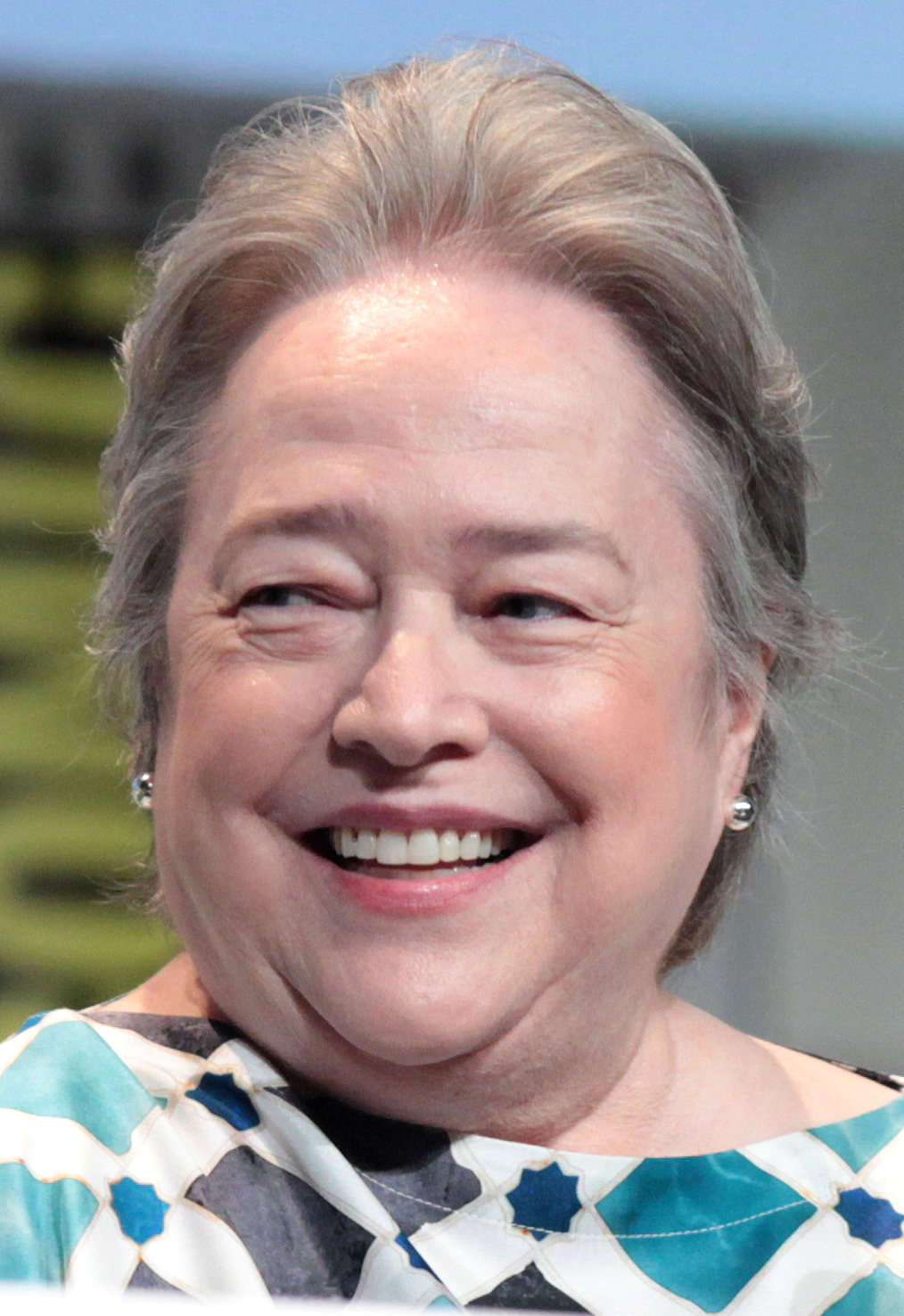
Kathy Bates was praised by critics for her portrayal in the film.

The original release date for Dolores Claiborne was December 21, 1994, according to Castle Rock prexy Martin Shafer. By January 1995, a release date of March 1995 had been announced.

Dolores Claiborne received generally positive reviews from critics. On Rotten Tomatoes it has an 87% rating based on 52 reviews, with an average rating of 6.90/10. The site's consensus states: "Post-Misery Kathy Bates proves to be another wonderful conduit for Stephen King's novels in this patient, gradually terrifying thriller." On Metacritic the film has a rating of 62 out of 100 based on 19 reviews, indicating "generally favorable" reviews. Audiences polled by CinemaScore gave the film an average grade of "B+" on an A+ to F scale.

Janet Maslin of The New York Times called it "a vivid film that revolves around Ms. Bates's powerhouse of a performance... Only after the film has carefully laid the groundwork for a story of old wounds and violent mishaps does the anticlimactic truth become apparent." Roger Ebert gave the film three out of four stars and praised the performances of Bates and Leigh, saying: "This is a horror story, all right, but not a supernatural one; all of the elements come out of such everyday horrors as alcoholism, wife beating, child abuse and the sin of pride."

Entertainment Weekly gave the film a negative review, awarding it a D+ rating and saying: "This solemnly ludicrous 'psychological' thriller is like one of Hollywood's old-hag gothics turned into a therapeutic grouse-a-thon – it's Hush...Hush, Sweet Charlotte for the Age of Oprah."

=== Box office ===
The movie debuted at number three for the week of March 26, 1995, with $5,721,920. It went on to make $24,361,867 domestically. That ranks it as the 15th-highest-grossing film based on a Stephen King novel, unadjusted for inflation. Adjusting for inflation, it ranks as the 17th-highest.

=== Awards ===
Kathy Bates and Jennifer Jason Leigh were nominated for the Best Actress and Best Supporting Actress awards at the 22nd Saturn Awards. Ellen Muth also won the Tokyo International Film Festival Award for Best Supporting Actress.

== Home video ==
Warner Bros. released the film on Blu-ray on November 21, 2017, under the label Warner Archive Collection. (Note: All movies pre-2010 produced by "Castle Rock Entertainment", with few exceptions are owned by Warner Bros. Entertainment.)

== See also ==
- List of films featuring eclipses
