= Seffernville, Nova Scotia =

Locality in Nova Scotia, Canada

Coordinates: 44°40′1.88″N 64°23′59.26″W

Seffernville in Nova Scotia

Seffernville (formerly Seffernsville) is a locality in the Canadian province of Nova Scotia, located in the Lunenburg Municipal District in Lunenburg County.
