= Pinehurst, Nova Scotia =

Community in Nova Scotia, Canada

Coordinates: 44°28′56.8″N 64°39′20″W

Pinehurst (population around 500) is a small community in the Canadian province of Nova Scotia, located along the LaHave River between New Germany and Wentzell's Lake in Nova Scotia. It is a stopping place on Trunk 10, which runs from Bridgewater to Middleton.

Pinehurst in Nova Scotia

== Economy ==
In the early 1990s, an Irving Oil service station was the main economic source for the village but was torn down in the late 1990s. Pinehurst has no community council. The only major business within the village limits is the New Germany Building Supply. Most people from this village seek work in Middleton, New Germany, Bridgewater, Halifax and any other major towns in the South Shore Region.

The Pinehurst area is part of the Lunenburg County Christmas Tree Growers' Association with many private growers who are very busy from mid November to mid December harvesting trees for export and also for private sale. Many of the growers even allow people to go into the "lots" and pick and cut their own trees.

== Recreation ==
The Lahave River, running through Pinehurst from New Germany Lake to Wentzell's Lake, is a favourite fishing spot for most anglers, boasting some of the best salmon fishing in Lunenburg County, and during high water levels can make for some very exciting canoeing and kayaking adventures.

== Education ==
The local youth who are involved with 4-H go to the Livewires 4-H club and Branch Lahave 4-H club. Students in the area go to New Germany Rural High School, New Germany Elementary School or West Northfield Elementary.
