= Maplewood, Nova Scotia =

Community in Nova Scotia, Canada

Coordinates: 44°37′37.78″N 64°37′20.63″W

Maplewood in Nova Scotia

Maplewood is a community in the Canadian province of Nova Scotia, located in the Lunenburg Municipal District in Lunenburg County.
