= Forties, Nova Scotia =

Community in Nova Scotia, Canada

Coordinates: 44°44′0.39″N 64°33′9.88″W

Forties in Nova Scotia

Forties (formerly Forties Settlement) is a community in the Canadian province of Nova Scotia, located in the Lunenburg Municipal District in Lunenburg County.
