= Marriotts Cove =

Community in Nova Scotia, Canada

Coordinates: 44°33′20.33″N 64°16′12.69″W

- Interactive map of Marriotts Cove
- Country: Canada
- Province: Nova Scotia
- County: Lunenburg
- Elevation: 1 m (3.3 ft)

Marriotts Cove is a community in the Canadian province of Nova Scotia, located in the Chester Municipal District.
