= Grimms Settlement =

Community in Nova Scotia, Canada

Coordinates: 44°20′27.96″N 64°23′12.61″W

Grimm's Settlement in Nova Scotia

Grimms Settlement is a community in the Canadian province of Nova Scotia, located in Lunenburg County.
