= Upper Northfield, Nova Scotia =

Community in Nova Scotia, Canada

Coordinates: 44°30′20.92″N 64°36′45.56″W

Upper Northfield in Nova Scotia

Upper Northfield is a community in the Canadian province of Nova Scotia, located in the Lunenburg Municipal District in Lunenburg County.
