= Hermans Island =

Community in Nova Scotia, Canada

Coordinates: 44°25′5.56″N 64°19′5.41″W

Herman's Island in Nova Scotia

Hermans Island is a community in the Canadian province of Nova Scotia, located in Lunenburg County.
