= Stanburn, Nova Scotia =

Community in Nova Scotia, Canada

Coordinates: 44°35′51.43″N 64°42′48.62″W

Stanburn in Nova Scotia

Stanburn is a community in the Canadian province of Nova Scotia, located in the Lunenburg Municipal District in Lunenburg County.
