= Middle New Cornwall, Nova Scotia =

Community in Nova Scotia, Canada

Coordinates: 44°30′9.46″N 64°31′21.74″W

Middle New Cornwall in Nova Scotia

Middle New Cornwall is a community in the Canadian province of Nova Scotia, located in the Lunenburg Municipal District in Lunenburg County.

While it is a small community, it has many lakes that served and still serve as great use for saw mills. In 1883, six saw mills were in use in Cornwall, but today only one remains.

Of all the lakes that you find Cornwall, Big Mush-a-Mush is the largest and most populated. Although throughout the 1800s the lake was often labeled on maps as Great Mush-a-Mush Lake.
