= Lower Branch, Nova Scotia =

Community in Nova Scotia, Canada

Coordinates: 44°25′22.77″N 64°34′49.38″W

Lower Branch in Nova Scotia

Lower Branch is a community in the Canadian province of Nova Scotia, located in the Lunenburg Municipal District.

== Parks ==
- Cookville Provincial Park
