= Chester Grant, Nova Scotia =

Community in Nova Scotia, Canada

Coordinates: 44°36′40″N 64°19′33″W

Chester Grant in Nova Scotia

Chester Grant is a community in the Canadian province of Nova Scotia, located in the Chester Municipal District.
