= Lower Northfield, Nova Scotia =

Community in Nova Scotia, Canada

Coordinates: 44°28′36″N 64°34′18.48″W

Lower Northfield in Nova Scotia

Lower Northfield is a community in the Canadian province of Nova Scotia, located in the Chester Municipal District.
