= Canaan, Lunenburg County, Nova Scotia =

Community in Nova Scotia, Canada

Coordinates: 44°41′8″N 64°14′37″W

Canaan in Nova Scotia

Canaan is a community in the Canadian province of Nova Scotia, located in the Chester Municipal District.
