= Stonehurst, Nova Scotia =

Community in Nova Scotia, Canada

Coordinates: 44°21′21.65″N 64°13′53.64″W

Stonehurst in Nova Scotia

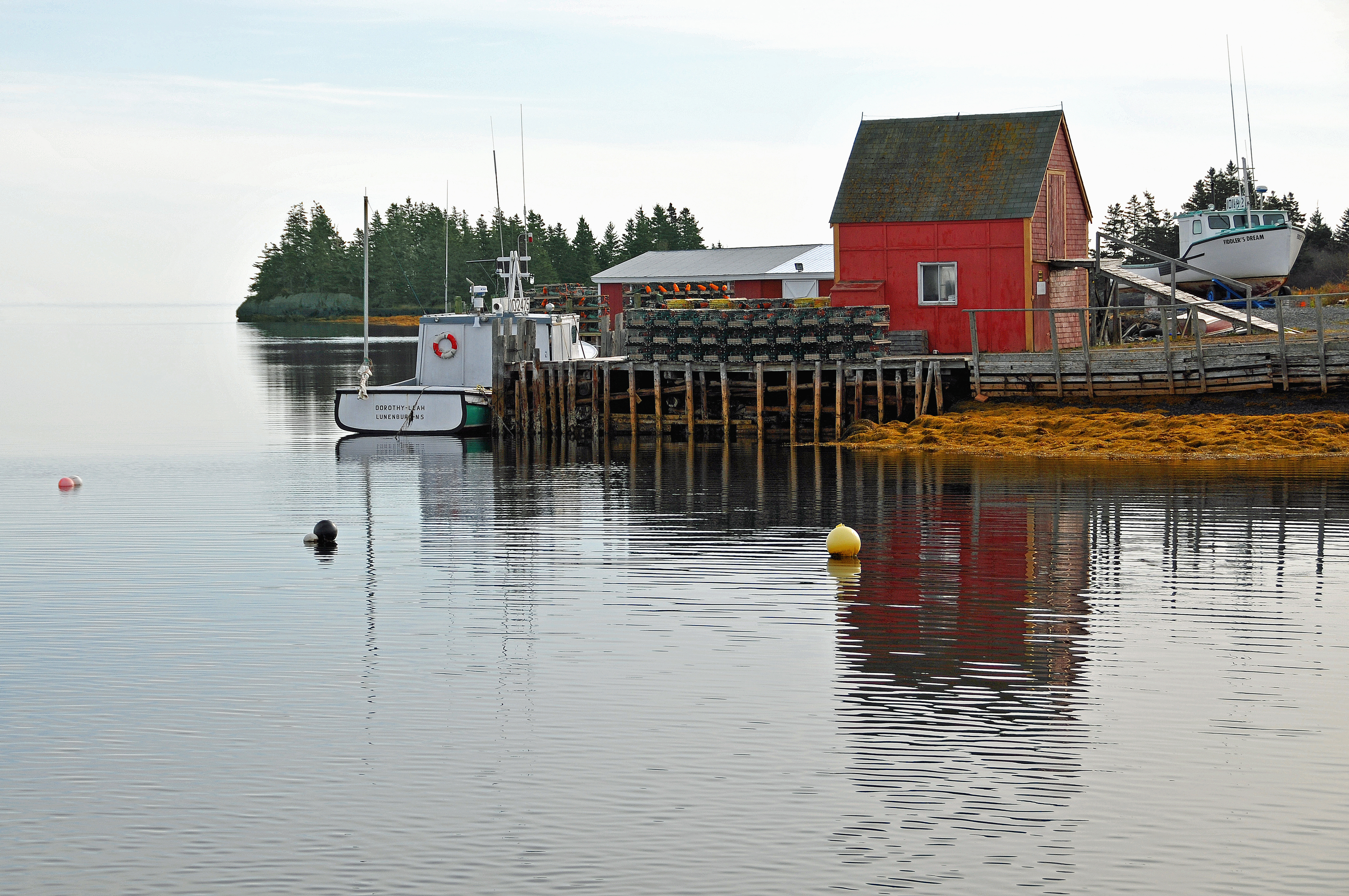

Stonehurst is a community in the Canadian province of Nova Scotia, located in the Lunenburg Municipal District in Lunenburg County.
