= Franey Corner, Nova Scotia =

Community in Nova Scotia, Canada

Coordinates: 44°43′36.25″N 64°39′13.88″W

Franey Corner in Nova Scotia

Franey Corner is a community in the Canadian province of Nova Scotia, located in the Chester Municipal District.

The 1838 Nova Scotia Census shows James Franey and Patrick Franey enumerated in Sherbrooke Settlement, Lunenburg Co. They are listed as the second and third household respectively. The first head of household listed in Sherbrooke is John Butler who was the father of Mary Butler, wife of the above Patrick Franey. Nearby Butler Lake was named after John Butler. The fourth head of household listed is John Connell, husband of James Franey's daughter Ann. The fifth head of household listed is William Tobin, husband of James Franey's daughter Margaret. The Franey name was also given to nearby Franey Lake, Franey Brook, and Franey Hill. The Franey family originated in New Ross, County Wexford, Ireland, arriving in Nova Scotia supposedly around 1824 when Patrick was a boy aged ten years. Patrick had two other sisters - Margaret who married Patrick Donnellan in Newfoundland before being one of the original settlers in Dalhousie Settlement in 1817, and Mary who married Charles McClintock in 1835. Donnellan Stillwater in East Dalhousie and McClintock Brook on the Dalhousie Road are named for those two families. Donnellan Brook on the Bay of Fundy is named after Patrick and Eleanor's son John Donnellan who married Anne Ogilvie. By the taking of the 1911 census, the Franeys had all left Franey Corner. Patrick Franey had eleven children. Of his sons, Martin's family were living in East Dalhousie, John's family was living in Weston, David and Albert were in Kentville, James, Ned, and Will were living in Aylesford, and Robert had moved to Washington State.
