= Glengarry, Pictou, Nova Scotia =

Community in Nova Scotia, Canada

Coordinates: 45°25′9.91″N 62°45′36.31″W

Glengarry in Nova Scotia

Glengarry is a community in the Canadian province of Nova Scotia, located in Pictou County. It is at the headwaters of the Middle River and on the Cape Breton and Northern Nova Scotia Railway line to Truro. It is now a small farming community but once had a railway station, post office, watering tank for steam locomotives supplied by water from the Middle River, and a school.
