= Beech Hill, Nova Scotia =

Community in Nova Scotia, Canada

Coordinates: 44°46′2.84″N 62°55′23.39″W

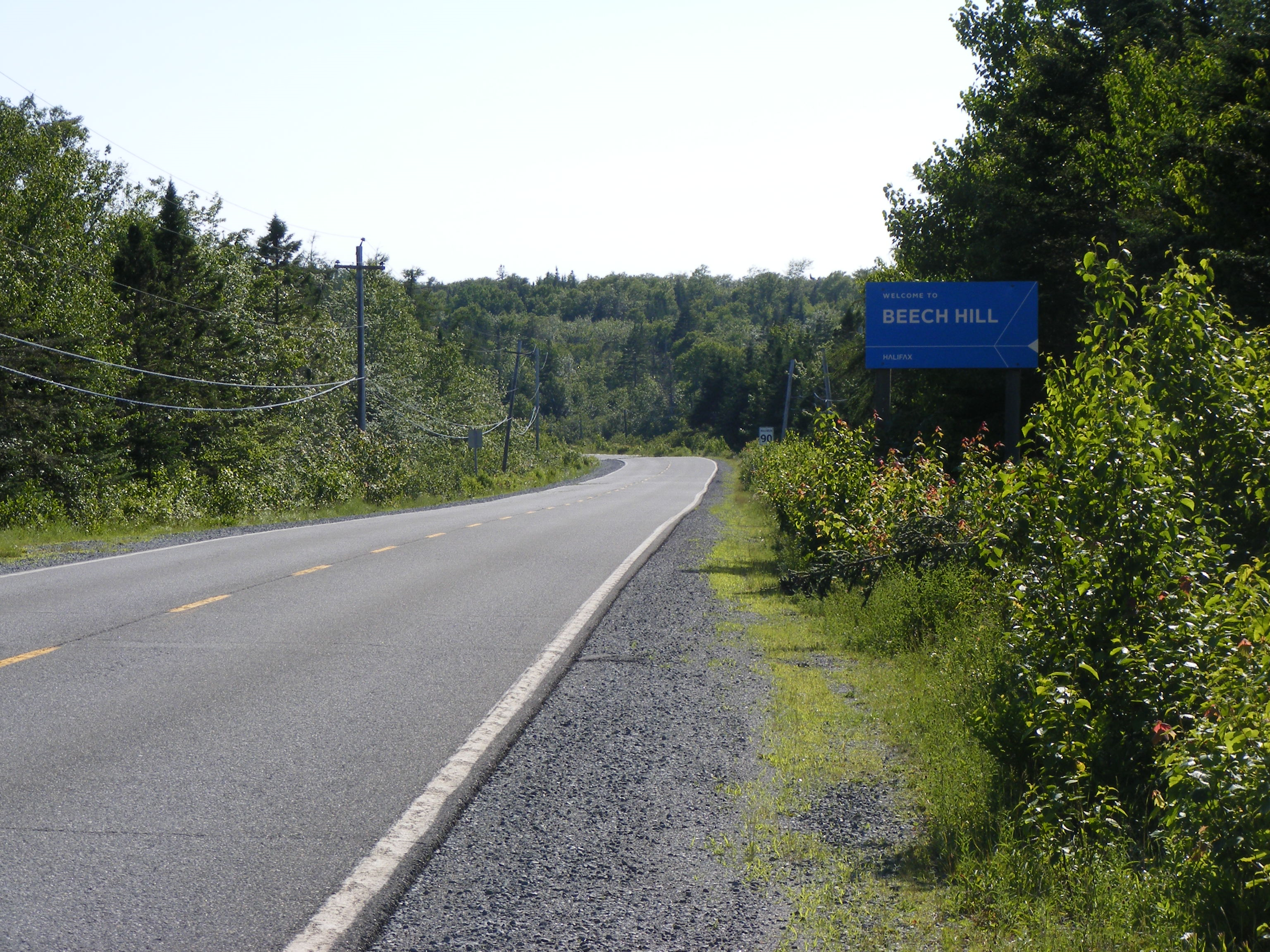
Beech Hill, July 2023.

Beech Hill in Nova Scotia

Beech Hill is a rural community in the Canadian province of Nova Scotia, located in Halifax Regional Municipality. The community has a population of 23. It is home to a baseball field, located inside of Beech Hill Road Park.
