= Martins River =

Community in Nova Scotia, Canada

Coordinates: 44°29′8.18″N 64°20′5.67″W

Martins River in Nova Scotia

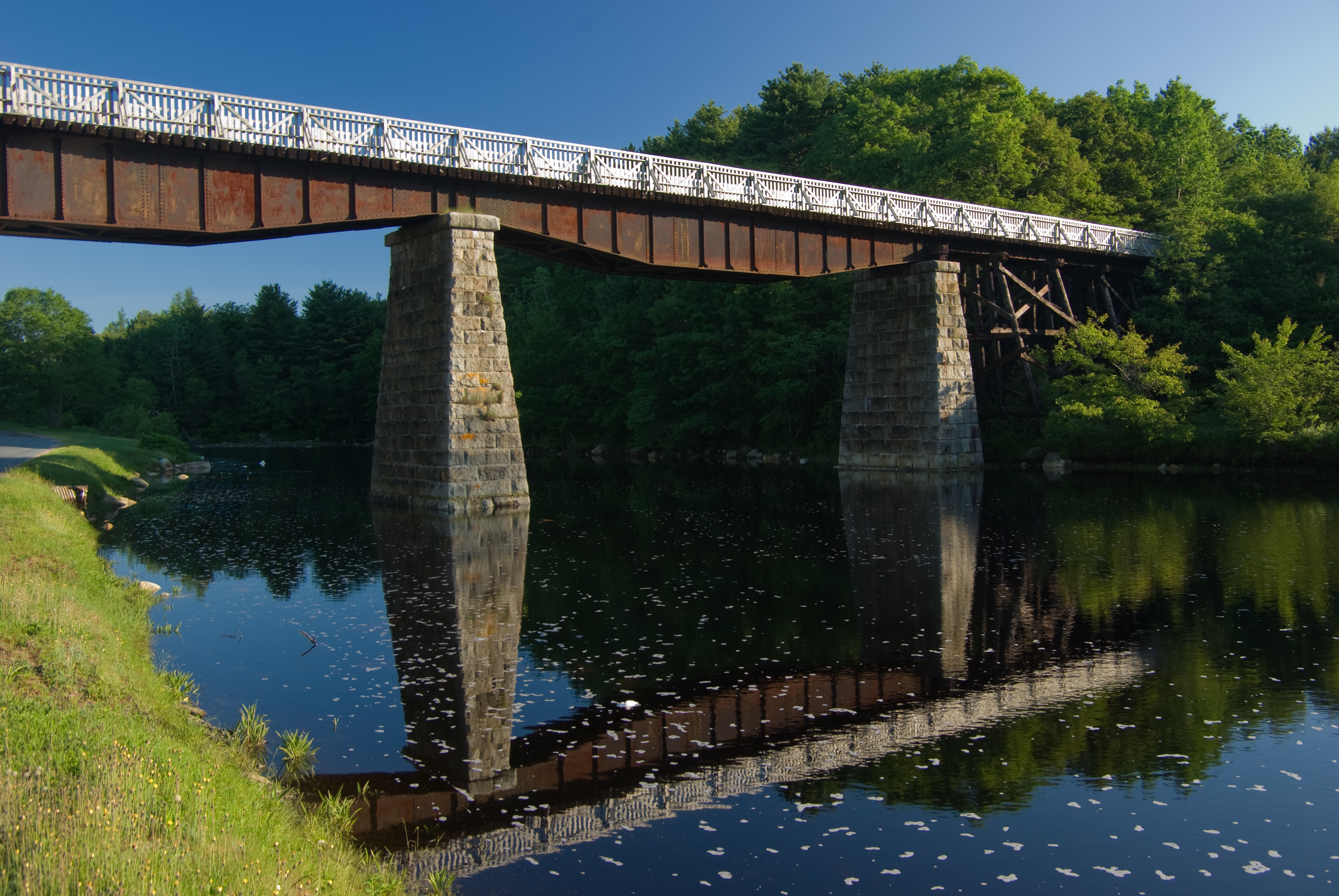
The Trans Canada Trail crosses Martins River on this former rail bridge.

Martins River is a community in the Canadian province of Nova Scotia, located in Lunenburg County. It takes its name from the river which flows through the community. A section of the Trans Canada Trail passes through the community on the former alignment of the Halifax and Southwestern Railway.
