= Western Shore, Nova Scotia =

Community in Nova Scotia, Canada

Coordinates: 44°31′53″N 64°18′52″W

Western Shore in Nova Scotia

Western Shore is a community in the Canadian province of Nova Scotia, located in Lunenburg County.
