= Municipality of the District of Lunenburg =

Lunenburg
- District municipality
- Municipality of the District of Lunenburg
- Seal

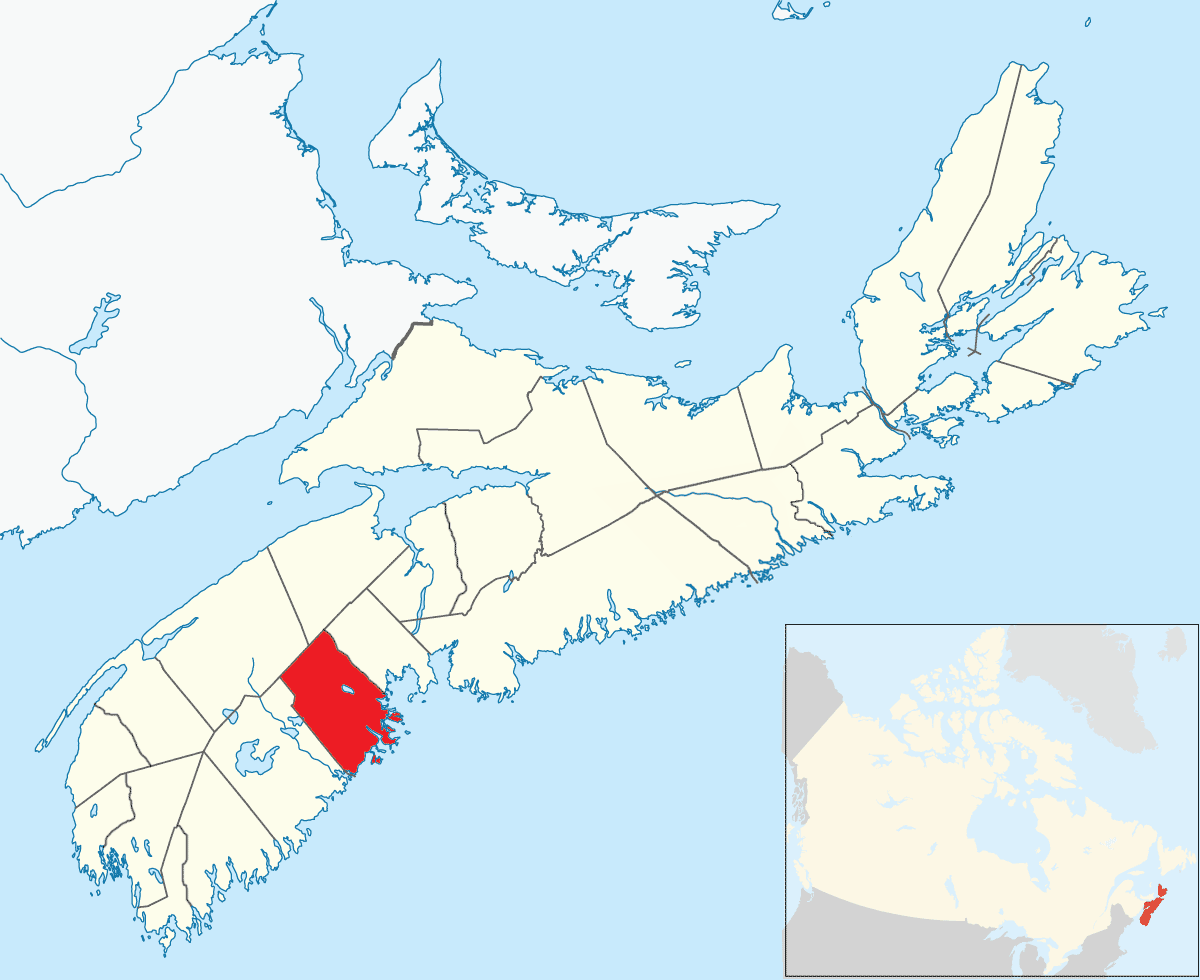
- Location of the Municipality of the District of Lunenburg
- Coordinates: 44°26′00″N 064°35′57″W
- Country: Canada
- Province: Nova Scotia
- County: Lunenburg
- Incorporated: April 17, 1879
- Municipal Seat: Bridgewater

Government
  - Type: Lunenburg Municipal Council
  - Mayor: Elspeth McLean-Wile
  - Deputy Mayor: Chasidy Veinotte

Area
  - Land: 1,759.59 km^{2} (679.38 sq mi)

Population (2016)
  - Total: 24,863
  - Density: 14.130/km^{2} (36.597/sq mi)
  - Change 2011-16: ▼1.0%
  - Census ranking: 173 of 4,870

Electoral districts
  - Federal: South Shore—St. Margarets
  - Provincial: Lunenburg / Lunenburg West
- Time zone: UTC−04:00 (AST)
  - Summer (DST): UTC−03:00 (ADT)
- Dwellings: 13,392
- Median Income*: $45,088 CDN
- Website: Official website
- Median household income, 2005 (all households)

The Municipality of the District of Lunenburg, is a district municipality in Lunenburg County, Nova Scotia, Canada. Statistics Canada classifies the district municipality as a municipal district.

Lunenburg surrounds the towns of Bridgewater, Lunenburg, and Mahone Bay, which are incorporated separately and not part of the district municipality.

== Demographics ==
Historical population
Year	Pop.	±%
1981	24,592	—
1986	25,196	+2.5%
1991	25,720	+2.1%
1996	25,949	+0.9%
2001	25,570	−1.5%
2006	25,164	−1.6%
2011	25,118	−0.2%
2016	24,863	−1.0%
2021	25,545	+2.7%
Source: Statistics Canada

In the 2021 Census of Population conducted by Statistics Canada, the Municipality of the District of Lunenburg had a population of 25,545 living in 11,502 of its 14,233 total private dwellings, a change of 2.7% from its 2016 population of 24,863. With a land area of 1,757.79 km^{2} (678.69 sq mi), it had a population density of 14.5/km^{2} (37.6/sq mi) in 2021.

=== Ethnicity ===
Panethnic groups in the Municipality of the District of Lunenburg (2001−2021)
Panethnic group	2021		2016		2011		2006		2001	
Panethnic group	Pop.	%	Pop.	%	Pop.	%	Pop.	%	Pop.	%
European (Note: Statistic includes all persons that did not make up part of a visible minority or an indigenous identity.)	24,140	95.08%	23,720	95.97%	24,305	97.36%	24,620	98.36%	24,970	98.25%
Indigenous	860	3.39%	760	3.08%	475	1.9%	345	1.38%	215	0.85%
African	155	0.61%	105	0.42%	60	0.24%	30	0.12%	115	0.45%
East Asian (Note: Statistic includes total responses of "Chinese", "Korean", and "Japanese" under visible minority section on census.)	75	0.3%	40	0.16%	55	0.22%	0	0%	45	0.18%
South Asian	60	0.24%	10	0.04%	0	0%	25	0.1%	10	0.04%
Southeast Asian (Note: Statistic includes total responses of "Filipino" and "Southeast Asian" under visible minority section on census.)	45	0.18%	15	0.06%	35	0.14%	0	0%	25	0.1%
Middle Eastern (Note: Statistic includes total responses of "West Asian" and "Arab" under visible minority section on census.)	35	0.14%	10	0.04%	0	0%	10	0.04%	40	0.16%
Latin American	15	0.06%	35	0.14%	0	0%	0	0%	0	0%
Other/multiracial (Note: Statistic includes total responses of "Visible minority, n.i.e." and "Multiple visible minorities" under visible minority section on census.)	15	0.06%	20	0.08%	0	0%	0	0%	0	0%
Total responses	25,390	99.39%	24,715	99.4%	24,965	99.39%	25,030	99.47%	25,415	99.39%
Total population	25,545	100%	24,863	100%	25,118	100%	25,164	100%	25,570	100%
Note: Totals greater than 100% due to multiple origin responses

=== Language ===
Mother tongue language (2006)
Language	Population	Pct (%)
English only	24,510	97.92%
Other languages	275	1.10%
French only	225	0.90%
Both English and French	20	0.08%

== See also ==
- List of municipalities in Nova Scotia
