= Lunenburg County, Nova Scotia =

Lunenburg County
- County
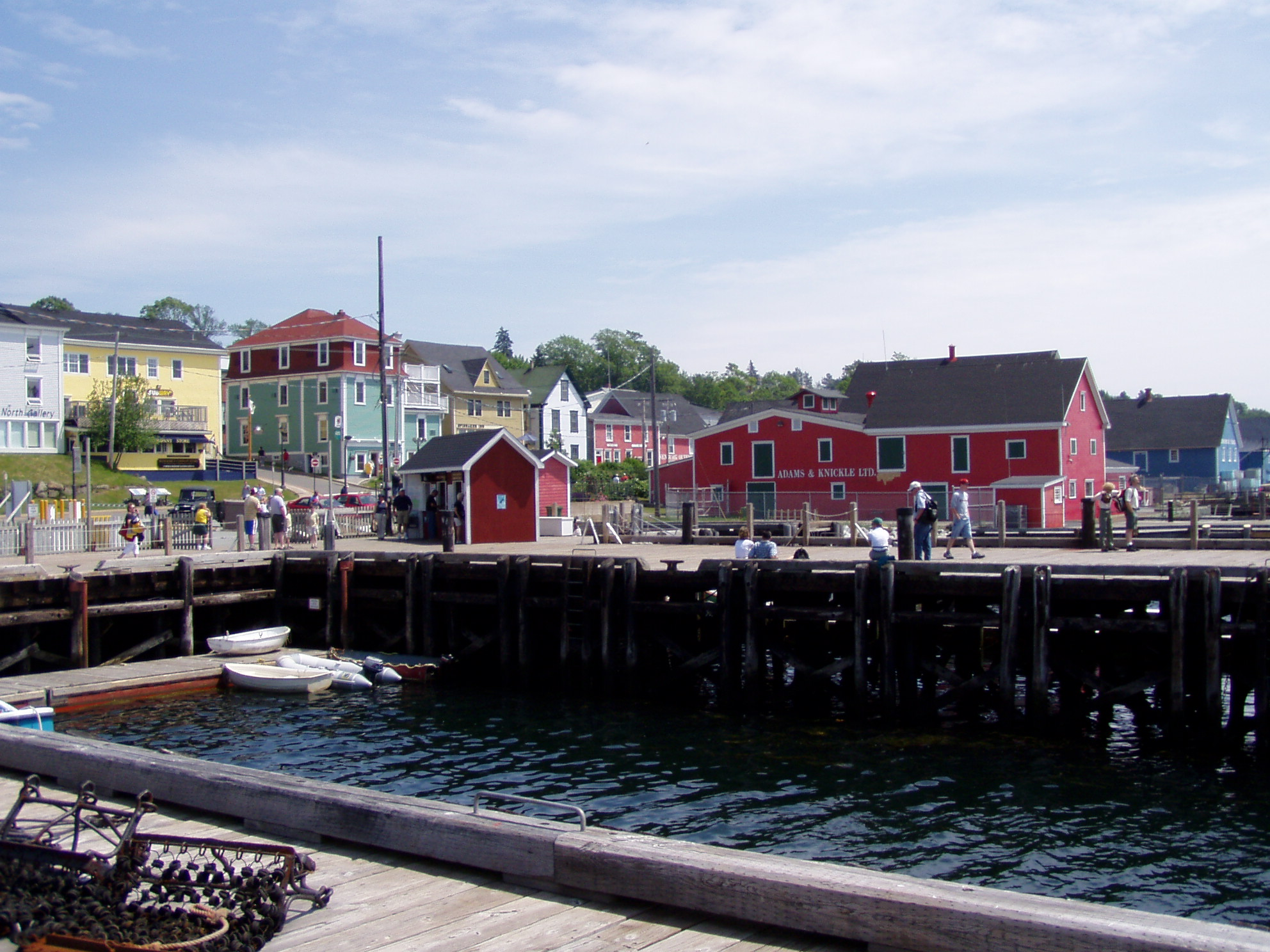
- Lunenburg harbourfront
- Nickname: "Christmas Tree Capital of the World"
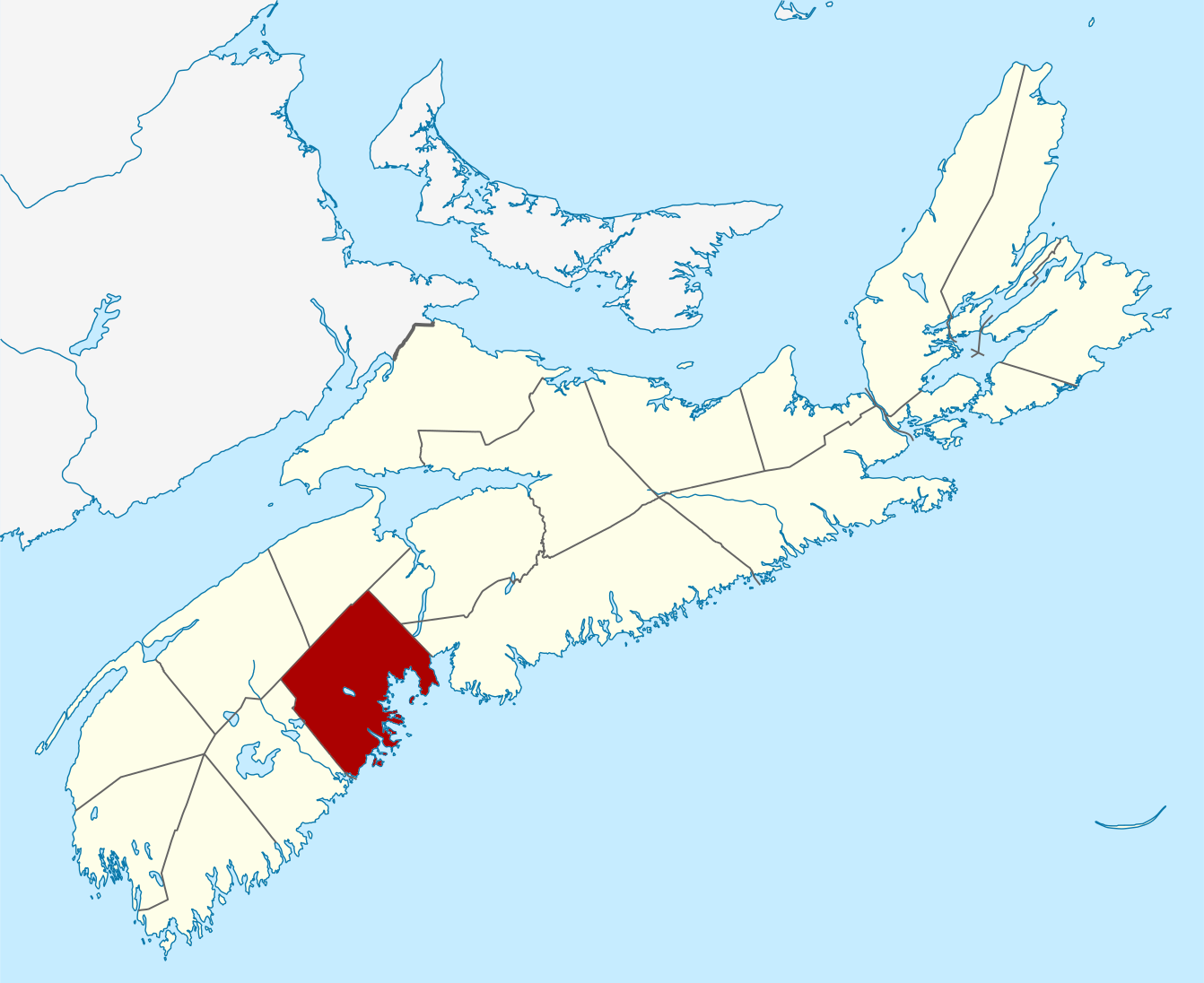
- Location of Lunenburg County, Nova Scotia
- Coordinates: 44.5°N 64.5°W
- Country: Canada
- Province: Nova Scotia
- District municipalities: Chester / Lunenburg
- Towns: Bridgewater / Lunenburg / Mahone Bay
- Established: August 17, 1759
- Divided into District Municipalities: April 17, 1879
- Electoral Districts Federal: South Shore–St. Margaret's
- Provincial: Chester-St. Margaret's / Lunenburg / Lunenburg West

Area
  - Land: 2,906.47 km^{2} (1,122.19 sq mi)

Population (2021)
  - Total: 48,599
  - Density: 16.7/km^{2} (43/sq mi)
- Time zone: UTC-4 (AST)
  - Summer (DST): UTC-3 (ADT)
- Area code: 902
- Dwellings: 24,786
- Median Income*: $43,257 CDN
- Median household income, 2005 (all households)

Lunenburg County is a historical county and census division on the South Shore of the Canadian province of Nova Scotia. Major settlements include Bridgewater, Lunenburg, and Mahone Bay.

== History ==
Named in honour of the British king who was also the duke of Brunswick-Lüneburg, it was established in 1759, when the Nova Scotia peninsula was divided into five counties. The county became smaller when new counties were created from its boundaries: Queens (1762), Hants (1781), Shelburne (1784), and Sydney (1784).

By Chapter 52 of the Statutes of 1863, Lunenburg County was divided into two districts for court sessional purposes – Chester and Lunenburg. That statute provided authority for the appointment of a Custos Rotulorum and for the establishment of a general sessions of the peace for the District of Chester, with the same powers as if it were a separate county. In 1879, the two districts were incorporated as district municipalities.

== Governance ==
Today the county has no legal status, although its borders are coincident with the five municipalities contained within it:

- the municipality of the District of Chester
- the municipality of the District of Lunenburg
- the town of Bridgewater
- the town of Lunenburg
- the town of Mahone Bay

The above municipalities comprise the entire territory of the county.

There are three Sipekneꞌkatik First Nation reserves in the county:

- Gold River 21
- New Ross 20
- Pennal 19

== Demographics ==
As a census division in the 2021 Census of Population conducted by Statistics Canada, Lunenburg County had a population of 48,599 living in 22,443 of its 27,092 total private dwellings, a change of 3.1% from its 2016 population of 47,126. With a land area of 2,906.47 km^{2} (1,122.19 sq mi), it had a population density of 16.7/km^{2} (43.3/sq mi) in 2021.

Population trend

Census	Population	Change (%)
1871	23,834	N/A
1881	28,583	▲19.93%
1891	31,075	▲8.72%
1901	32,389	▲4.23%
1911	33,260	▲2.69%
1921	33,742	▲1.45%
1931	31,674	▼6.13%
1941	32,942	▲1.45%
1981	45,746	N/A
1986	46,483	▲2.5%
1991	47,634	▲4.1%
1996	47,561	▼0.2%
2001	47,591	▲0.1%
2006	47,150	▼0.9%
2011	47,313	▲0.3%
2016	47,126	▼0.4%
2021	48,599	▲3.1%

Mother tongue language (2011)

Language	Population	Pct (%)
English only	45,305	96.83%
French only	525	1.12%
Other languages	805	1.72%
Multiple responses	150	0.32%

Ethnic Groups (2006)

Ethnic Origin	Population	Pct (%)
Canadian	19,265	41.3%
German	16,290	34.9%
English	13,405	28.8%
Scottish	8,655	18.6%
French	6,360	13.6%
Irish	6,155	13.2%
Dutch	3,105	6.7%
Indigenous	1,930	4.1%
Welsh	1,000	2.1%

Religious make-up (2001)

Religion	Population	Pct (%)
Protestant	34,220	72.80%
No religion	6,810	14.49%
Catholic	5,230	11.13%
Other Christian	535	1.14%
Muslim	80	0.17%
Jewish	70	0.15%
Christian Orthodox	20	0.04%
Hindu	20	0.04%
Buddhist	15	0.03%
Other religions	10	0.02%

== Access routes ==
Highways and numbered routes that run through the county, including external routes that start or finish at the county boundary:

- Highways
  - Hwy 103
- Trunk Routes
  - Trunk 3
  - Trunk 10
  - Trunk 12
- Collector Routes:
  - Route 208
  - Route 210
  - Route 324
  - Route 325
  - Route 329
  - Route 331
  - Route 332
- External Routes:
  - None

== See also ==
- List of communities in Lunenburg County, Nova Scotia
- List of communities in Nova Scotia
- Lunenburg English, the distinctive dialect of the area
