= Nova Scotia Highway 103 =

Highway in Nova Scotia

Highway 103
- Fishermen's Memorial Highway
- Highway 103 highlighted in red

Route information
- Maintained by Nova Scotia Department of Public Works
- Length: 291.3 km (181.0 mi)
- Existed: 1963–present

Major junctions
- East end: Hwy 102 in Halifax
- Trunk 3 in Halifax; Trunk 3 in Timberlea; Trunk 14 in Windsor Road; Trunk 12 in Chester Basin; Trunk 10 in Cookville; Trunk 3 in Hebbville; Trunk 3 in Brooklyn; Trunk 8 in Milton; Trunk 3 in Port Mouton; Trunk 3 in Sable River; Trunk 3 in Jordan Falls; Trunk 3 in Woodlawn; Trunk 3 in Birchtown; Trunk 3 in Barrington; Trunk 3 in Argyle; Trunk 3 in Glenwood
- West end: Hardscratch Road in Yarmouth

Location
- Country: Canada
- Province: Nova Scotia
- Counties: Halifax Regional Municipality, Lunenburg, Queens, Shelburne, Yarmouth
- Towns: Yarmouth, Shelburne, Bridgewater, Lunenburg, Mahone Bay

Highway system
- Provincial highways in Nova Scotia; 100-series
← Hwy 102	→ Hwy 104 (TCH)

Highway 103 is an east–west highway in Nova Scotia that runs from Halifax to Yarmouth.

The highway follows a route of 291 kilometres (181 mi) along the province's South Shore region fronting the Atlantic coast. The route parallels its predecessor, local Trunk 3. The highway varies from 2-lane controlled access to 2-lane local secondary roads on the section between Yarmouth and Hebbville. East of Hebbville to Hubbards, the highway is 2-lane controlled access, with the exception of a 3 km (2 mi) 4-lane divided freeway near Chester. From just west of Hubbards (exit 6), to the interchange with Highway 102 (near Bayers Lake) in Halifax, the highway is 4-lane divided freeway. Same as Highway 101, kilometre markers increase running west-to-east, increasing from Yarmouth to Halifax; with exit numbers running east-to-west, increasing from Halifax to Yarmouth.

In 2013, Highway 103 was redesignated as the Fishermen's Memorial Highway.

== History ==
The highway has developed sporadically since the 1970s, with the 2-lane controlled access portion to Bridgewater being largely responsible for the abandonment of CN Rail's South Shore line, the former Halifax and Southwestern Railway.

In November 1998, construction was completed that twinned a five kilometer section of highway between exit 2 and exit 3. In November 2006, construction was completed that twinned 15 kilometres of highway between exit 3 and exit 5. In December 2006, an 8.3 kilometre bypass around Barrington was completed.

In late September 2015 a new section of highway was opened to bypass the Port Joli area. In November 2016, a new section was completed which bypassed Port Mouton. Residents complained that the single exit east of the community had lengthened the trip for people heading west from Port Mouton.

The new interchange in Ingramport (exit 5A) opened in January 2017.

Work on twinning Highway 103 from exit 5 (Tantallon) to exit 5A (Ingramport) began in February 2018 and was completed in December 2020. Twinning from exit 5A (Ingramport) to exit 6 (Hubbards) started in 2020 and was completed in July 2024. Construction on the twinning from exit 6 (Hubbards) to exit 9 (Chester) is underway.

== Names of Highway 103 ==
- Fishermen's Memorial Highway – June 2013
- Barrington Bypass – Barrington to Oak Park, Shelburne County
- Nine Mile Road – Sable River to Jordan Falls, Shelburne County

== Safety concerns ==
Between 2006 and 2009, there were 29 deaths on the highway. In 2009, it was considered Nova Scotia's deadliest highway and was ranked the second most dangerous highway in Canada by the Canadian Automobile Association. In 2009 alone, ten people died in automobile accidents on the highway, according to the Nova Scotia Department of Transportation and Infrastructure Renewal. Between 2008 and 2012, there were 22 fatalities on the highway.

In September 2018, local residents raised concern over the presence of a road sign on the highway, near the turnoff to Port Mouton, that had a very confusing appearance, looking like a patchwork of several other road signs. It was supposedly revealed when a hotel removed its billboard advertisement, revealing the sign below.

== Exit list ==
County	Location	km	mi	Exit	Destinations	Notes
Halifax	Halifax	0.0	0.0	1B	Hwy 102 to Hwy 101 – Halifax, Dartmouth, Windsor, Airport, Truro, Bedford	Hwy 103 eastern terminus.
Halifax	Halifax	0.4	0.25	1D	Dunbrack Street	Eastbound exit only.
Halifax	Halifax	1.2	0.75	2	Trunk 3 west (St. Margarets Bay Road) to Route 333 (Lighthouse Route) – Beechville, Lakeside, Peggys Cove	Westbound signed as exits 2A (west) and 2B (east)
Halifax	Timberlea	5.6	3.5	3	To Trunk 3 / Timberlea Village Parkway	
Halifax	Hubley	12.7	7.9	4	Trunk 3 – Timberlea, Five Island Lake	
Halifax	Upper Tantallon	19.6	12.2	5	Route 213 (Hammond's Plains Road) to Trunk 3 / Route 333 – Peggys Cove, Bedford	
Halifax		29.9	18.6	5A	To Trunk 3 – Ingramport, Black Point, Boutiliers Point	
Lunenburg	Hubbards	40.8	25.4	6	Trunk 3 / Route 329 – Queensland, Blandford	
Lunenburg	East River	50.0	31.1	7	Trunk 3 / Route 329 – Chester, Blandford	
Lunenburg	Chester	57.2	35.5	8	Trunk 14 – Chester, Windsor	
Lunenburg	Chester Basin	61.3	38.1	9	Trunk 12 – Kentville, New Ross	
Lunenburg	Mahone Bay	75.0	46.6	10	Trunk 3 – Lunenburg, Martin's River	
Lunenburg	Blockhouse	79.9	49.6	11	Route 324 (Cornwall Road) to Route 325 – Mahone Bay, Lunenburg	
Lunenburg	Bridgewater	91.6	56.9	12	Trunk 10 to Route 331 / Route 332 – West LaHave, East LaHave, Riverport	
Lunenburg	Bridgewater	91.8	57.0	Crosses the LaHave River		
Lunenburg	Bridgewater	93.0	57.8	12A	Bridgewater Business Park	New roundabout interchange opened on December 20, 2024
Lunenburg	Bridgewater	94.8	58.9	13	Route 325 (Victoria Road) to Route 331 – Bakers Settlement, Wileville	
Lunenburg	Hebb's Cross	101.4	63.0	14	Trunk 3 east – Hebbville, Bridgewater	At-grade
Lunenburg	Italy Cross	107.9	67.0	15	Italy Cross Road − Crousetown, Petite Riviere, Broad Cove, Rissers Beach Provincial Park	At-grade
Lunenburg	Middlewood	111.7	69.4	16	Hirtle Road / Camperdown School Road − Vogler's Cove, Broad Cove, Camperdown	At-grade
Queens		122.4	76.1	17	Route 331 – East Port Medway, Voglers Cove, Charleston, Cherry Hill	At-grade
Queens				Crosses the Medway River		
Queens		124.2	77.2	17A	Port Medway Road − Mill Village, Port Medway, East/West Berlin, Charleston	At-grade
Queens		130.5	81.1	18	Trunk 3 west – Brooklyn, Liverpool	At-grade
Queens	Liverpool	136.9	85.1	19	Trunk 8 to Trunk 3 – Milton, Brooklyn	
Queens	Liverpool	137.5	85.4	Crosses the Mersey River		
Queens		140.3	87.2	20A	To Trunk 3 (Old Port Mouton Road) – White Point, Hunt's Point	At-grade
Queens		153.2	95.2	21	To Trunk 3 – Summerville Centre, Hunt's Point, White Point	At-grade
Queens	Port Mouton	155.9	96.9		Trunk 3 east	Intersection closed, use exit 21
Queens		160.7	99.9	22	Trunk 3 west – Port Joli, East Side Port l'Hébert, Kejimkujik National Park (Seaside Adjunct)	At-grade; Trunk 3 is unsigned
Queens		163.3	101.5		Trunk 3 east – Port Joli	Intersection closed, use exit 22
Shelburne	Sable River	176.6	109.7	23	Trunk 3 west – Lockeport	At-grade
Shelburne	Jordan Falls	190.3	118.2	24	Trunk 3 east / Lake John Road – Lockeport	At-grade
Shelburne	Jordan Falls	190.8	118.6		Jordan Branch Road − Jordan Branch, Jordan Ferry, Jordan Bay	At-grade
Shelburne		196.0	121.8	25	Trunk 3 west – Shelburne	At-grade
Shelburne	Shelburne	200.0	124.3	26	Route 203 – Ohio, East Kemptville	At-grade
Shelburne	Birchtown	206.9	128.6	27	Trunk 3 east – Gunning Cove, Ingomar	At-grade
Shelburne	Clyde River	220.3	136.9	28	Route 309 south (South Road) / Quinns Falls Road – Port Clyde, Eel Bay, Port La Tour	At-grade
Shelburne	Barrington	230.0	142.9	29	Trunk 3 west to Route 309 – Port La Tour	At-grade
Shelburne	Riverhead	234.3	145.6	30	To Trunk 3 – Barrington Passage, Lower Woods Harbour, Upper Woods Harbour	
Yarmouth	Pubnico	256.0	159.1	31	To Trunk 3 / Route 335 – Lower Argyle	At-grade
Yarmouth	Argyle	268.4	166.8	32	Trunk 3 east – Central Argyle, Argyle Head	East end of Trunk 3 unsigned concurrency; at-grade, proposed interchange
Yarmouth	Argyle	269.0	167.1	Crosses the Argyle River		
Yarmouth	Argyle	269.4	167.4	32A	Trunk 3 west – Glenwood	West end of Trunk 3 unsigned concurrency; at-grade, proposed intersection closure
Yarmouth		276.2	171.6		Eel Lake Road / Belleville Road	At-grade
Yarmouth		276.8– 277.4	172.0– 172.4	Crosses Eel Lake		
Yarmouth	Tusket	281.2	174.7	33	Route 308 to Trunk 3 – Quinan	
Yarmouth	Tusket	282.4	175.5	Crosses the Tusket River		
Yarmouth	Yarmouth	291.3	181.0		Hardscratch Road − Brooklyn	Hwy 103 western terminus
Yarmouth	Yarmouth	292.1	181.5		Trunk 3 (Starrs Road) to Hwy 101 / Trunk 1 – Ferry	
1.000 mi = 1.609 km; 1.000 km = 0.621 mi: Closed/former; Concurrency terminus; Incomplete access; Unopened

== Communities ==
- Halifax
- Beechville
- Lakeside
- Timberlea
- Hubley
- Lewis Lake
- Upper Tantallon
- Head of St. Margarets Bay
- Ingramport
- Black Point
- Queensland
- Hubbards
- Simms Settlement
- East River
- East Chester
- Windsor Road
- Chester Basin
- Beech Hill
- Gold River
- Western Shore
- Martins Point
- Martins River
- Oakland
- Clearland
- Blockhouse
- Maitland
- Pine Grove
- Oakhill
- Bridgewater
- Cookville
- Bridgewater
- Wileville
- Hebbville
- Hebbs Cross
- Italy Cross
- Middlewood
- Danesville
- Mill Village
- Brooklyn
- Milton
