= Nova Scotia Trunk 3 =

Highway in Nova Scotia, Canada

Trunk 3
- Lighthouse Route
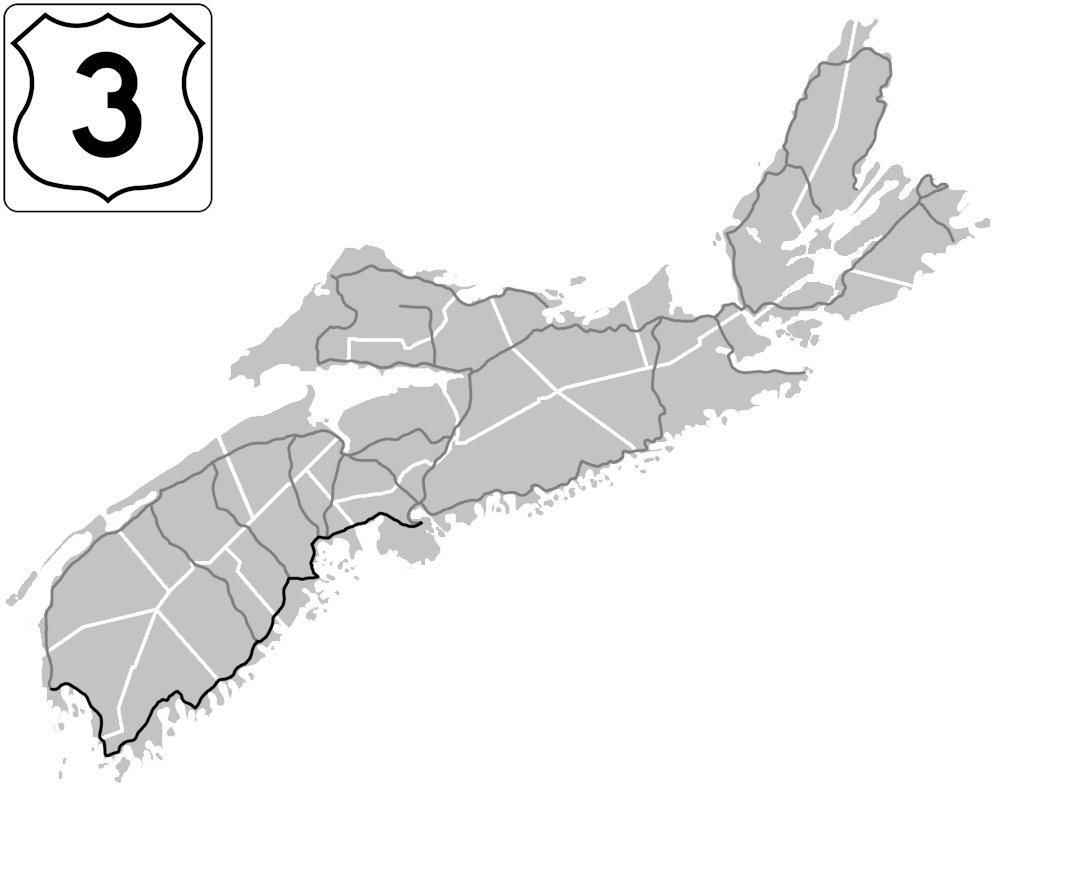

Route information
- Maintained by Nova Scotia Department of Transportation and Infrastructure Renewal
- Length: 389.4 km (242.0 mi)

Major junctions
- East end: Connaught Avenue in Halifax
- Hwy 103 in Halifax; Trunk 14 in Chester; Trunk 12 in Chester Basin; Trunk 8 in Liverpool; Hwy 101 in Yarmouth
- West end: Trunk 1 in Yarmouth

Location
- Country: Canada
- Province: Nova Scotia
- Counties: Halifax, Lunenburg, Queens, Shelburne, Yarmouth Halifax Regional Municipality, Chester Municipal District, Lunenburg Municipal District, Region of Queens Municipality, Municipality of the District of Shelburne; Municipality of the District of Barrington; Municipality of the District of Yarmouth, Municipality of Argyle
- Towns: Yarmouth, Shelburne, Lockeport, Bridgewater, Lunenburg, Mahone Bay

Highway system
- Provincial highways in Nova Scotia; 100-series
← Trunk 2	→ Trunk 4

Nova Scotia Trunk 3 is an east–west trunk highway in Nova Scotia. The route runs from Halifax to Yarmouth, along the South Shore. Trunk 3's status as an important regional highway link has been superseded by the parallel Highway 103.

== Route description ==
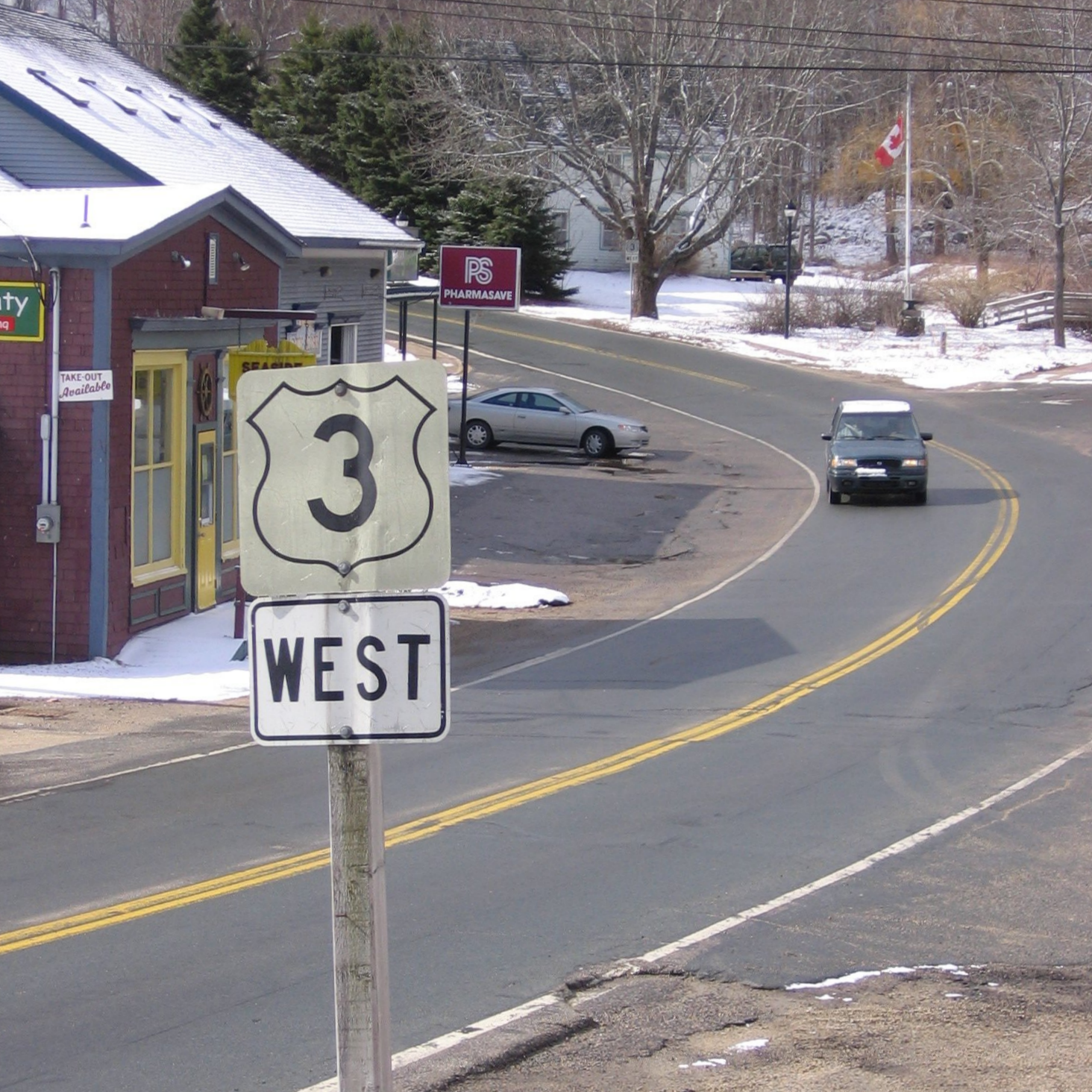
View of Trunk 3 as it passes through Chester Basin, Lunenburg County, Nova Scotia.

The eastern terminus of Trunk 3 on provincial maps is at the Armdale Roundabout in Halifax. Travelling inbound from the traffic circle along Quinpool Road, Trunk 3 continues to be marked with "3 INBOUND" signs until just before Quinpool Road's intersection with Connaught Avenue. The sign "3 ENDS" marks the signed eastern terminus of the route. Traveling outbound from the traffic circle Trunk 3 formally proceeds west using the name St. Margaret's Bay Road and passes through Timberlea and Upper Tantallon.

The road follows the coast of St. Margarets Bay, passing through Hubbards. It crosses the isthmus of the Aspotogan Peninsula to reach Chester. West of Chester, Trunk 3 follows the shore of Mahone Bay to reach the town of the same name. The highway then turns southeast to the town of Lunenburg, enters the town following Maple Street, Falkland Street and Victoria Road, before continuing westward to the town of Bridgewater.

Leaving Bridgewater to the southwest, Trunk 3 intersects Highway 103 at exit 14. Trunk 3 is no longer signed in some portions between Bridgewater and Barrington, as Highway 103 assumed some of its former route in the 1970s. Trunk 3 "re-appears" as the main street and approaches to some towns that Highway 103 has bypassed, including the Liverpool, Lockeport and Shelburne areas.

At Barrington, Trunk 3 departs Highway 103. The highway closely follows the coast of the Barrington Passage and the Gulf of Maine to reach the Pubnico area, then continuing north along the coast to Argyle. The highway turns west through Tusket to reach its western end at Yarmouth where it meets the Highway 101 and Trunk 1.

== Communities ==
- Halifax
- Beechville
- Lakeside
- Timberlea
- Hubley
- Lewis Lake
- Upper Tantallon
- Head Of St. Margarets Bay
- Boutiliers Point
- Ingramport
- Black Point
- Queensland
- Hubbards
- Simms Settlement
- East River
- East Chester
- Chester
- Robinsons Corner
- Marriotts Cove
- Chester Basin
- Gold River

== Major intersections ==
County	Location	km	mi	Destinations	Notes
Halifax	Halifax	−1.4	−0.87	Quinpool Road (Hwy 102 inbound) – Downtown Halifax Connaught Avenue (Hwy 102 outbound)	Signed as Trunk 3 Inbound/Outbound along Quinpool Road
Halifax	Halifax	0.0	0.0	Chebucto Road – Macdonald Bridge; To Hwy 102 / Hwy 103 / Joseph Howe Drive – Bedford; Herring Cove Road (Route 349 south) to Purcells Cove Road (Route 253)	Armdale Rotary; Trunk 3 eastern terminus; Trunk 3 follows St. Margarets Bay Road
Halifax	Halifax	1.9	1.2	Dunbrack Street (Trunk 32) to Hwy 102 / Route 306 – Fairview, Spryfield	Partially grade separated; formerly Northwest Arm Drive
Halifax	Halifax	3.6	2.2	Route 333 west – Ragged Lake, Prospect, Peggys Cove	
Halifax	Timberlea	4.0	2.5	Hwy 103 to Hwy 102 – Bridgewater, Yarmouth, Halifax, Airport	Hwy 103 exit 2
Halifax	Hubley	5.6	3.5	Hwy 103 – Upper Tantallon, Yarmouth, Timberlea, Halifax	Hwy 103 exit 4
Halifax	Upper Tantallon	24.0	14.9	Route 213 east – Hammonds Plains, Bedford	
Halifax	Upper Tantallon	24.3	15.1	Route 333 south – Tantallon, Peggys Cove	
Lunenburg	Hubbards	47.2	29.3	Route 329 south – Mill Cove, Fox Point, Blandford	
Lunenburg	East River	57.1	35.5	Route 329 north – Deep Cove, Blandford	Route 329 is signed as north but heads south
Lunenburg	Chester	68.5	42.6	Trunk 14 north – Windsor	
Lunenburg	Chester Basin	73.5	45.7	Trunk 12 north – New Ross, Kentville	
Lunenburg	Mahone Bay	90.4	56.2	Route 325 north – Bridgewater	
Lunenburg	Lunenburg	99.9	62.1	Route 332 west – Bridgewater, Riverport	East end of Route 332 concurrency
Lunenburg	Lunenburg	100.1	62.2	Route 332 east – Blue Rocks, First Peninsula	West end of Route 332 concurrency
Lunenburg	Lunenburg	101.7	63.2	Route 324 north (Green Street) – Blockhouse	
Lunenburg	Lunenburg	103.6	64.4	Route 332 to Route 324 – Blue Rocks, Mahone Bay, Riverport	
Lunenburg	Upper LaHave	113.6	70.6	Route 332 east – Middle LaHave, Riverport	
Lunenburg	Bridgewater	119.6	74.3	To Trunk 10 / Route 325 / LaHave Street	Trunk 3 turns onto Old Bridge Street
Lunenburg	Bridgewater	119.8	74.4	Crosses the LaHave River	
Lunenburg	Bridgewater	119.9	74.5	Route 331 east (King Street) to Route 325 – Middleton, Kejimkujik National Park	Trunk 3 turns onto King Street; east end of Route 331 concurrency
Lunenburg	Bridgewater	120.1	74.6	Route 331 west (King Street) – West LaHave, East LaHave	Trunk 3 turns onto Dufferin Street; west end of Route 331 concurrency
Lunenburg	Hebb's Cross	128.1	79.6	Hwy 103 – Liverpool, Yarmouth, Mahone Bay, Halifax	At-grade; Hwy 103 exit 14
Gap in Trunk 3
Queens		157.1	97.6	Hwy 103 – Liverpool, Shelburne, Yarmouth, Mill Village, Bridgewater, Halifax	At-grade; Hwy 103 exit 18
Queens	Liverpool	164.4	102.2	Trunk 8 north – Kejimkujik National Park, Annapolis Royal	
Queens	Liverpool	165.2	102.7	Crosses the Mersey River	
Queens		184.2	114.5	To Hwy 103 – Shelburne, Yarmouth, Liverpool, Halifax	Connects to Hwy 103 exit 21
Queens	Port Mouton	186.0	115.6	Central Port Mouton Road – South West Port Mouton	
Queens		186.7	116.0	Hwy 103	Intersection closed (dead end), use exit 21
Gap in Trunk 3
Queens		191.5	119.0	Hwy 103 – Shelburne, Yarmouth, Liverpool, Halifax	At-grade; Hwy 103 exit 22; east end of Trunk 3 unsigned section
Queens	Port Joli	193.5	120.2	St. Catherines Road – Kejimkujik National Park (Seaside Adjunct)	
Queens		196.0	121.8	Hwy 103	Intersection closed (dead end), use exit 22; west end of Trunk 3 unsigned section
Gap in Trunk 3
Shelburne	Sable River	209.3	130.1	Hwy 103 – Shelburne, Yarmouth, Liverpool, Halifax	At-grade; Hwy 103 exit 23
Shelburne	Jordan Falls	242.8	150.9	Hwy 103 – Shelburne, Liverpool	At-grade; Hwy 103 exit 24
Gap in Trunk 3
Shelburne		248.5	154.4	Hwy 103 – Barrington, Yarmouth, Liverpool, Halifax	At-grade; Hwy 103 exit 25
Shelburne	Shelburne	255.1	158.5	Route 203 north – Ohio	
Shelburne	Birchtown	262.1	162.9	Hwy 103 – Barrington, Yarmouth, Liverpool, Halifax	At-grade; Hwy 103 exit 27
Gap in Trunk 3
Shelburne	Barrington	298.7	185.6	Hwy 103 – Pubnico, Yarmouth, Shelburne, Halifax	At-grade; Hwy 103 exit 29
Shelburne	Barrington	300.0	186.4	Route 309 north – Villagedale, Port La Tour	Route 309 is signed as north but heads south
Shelburne	Barrington Passage	308.0	191.4	Route 330 south – Cape Sable Island, Clark's Harbour, Stoney Island	
Yarmouth	Pubnico	347.6	216.0	Route 335 south – West Pubnico	
Yarmouth	Argyle	361.4	224.6	Hwy 103 east – Pubnico, Halifax	At-grade; east end of Hwy 103 unsigned concurrency; Hwy 103 exit 32
Yarmouth	Argyle	362.0	224.9	Crosses the Argyle River	
Yarmouth	Argyle	362.4	225.2	Hwy 103 west – Tusket, Yarmouth	At-grade; west end of Hwy 103 unsigned concurrency; Hwy 103 exit 32A
Yarmouth	Tusket	374.1	232.5	Route 308 south – Amiraults Hill, Sluice Point	East end of Route 308 concurrency
Yarmouth	Tusket	374.6	232.8	Route 308 north – Quinan	West end of Route 308 concurrency
Yarmouth	Tusket	376.0	233.6	Crosses the Tusket River	
Yarmouth	Yarmouth	387.3	240.7	To Hwy 103 east / Haley Road / Hardscratch Road – Airport, Tusket, Halifax	
Yarmouth	Yarmouth	387.9	241.0	Hwy 101 east – Hebron, Digby, Halifax	Hwy 101 western terminus
Yarmouth	Yarmouth	389.4	242.0	Main Street (Trunk 1) – Ferry, Hebron, Digby	Trunk 3 western terminus
1.000 mi = 1.609 km; 1.000 km = 0.621 mi: Closed/former; Concurrency terminus
