= St. Margaret's Bay, Nova Scotia (administrative district) =

St. Margarets Bay
- Administrative District
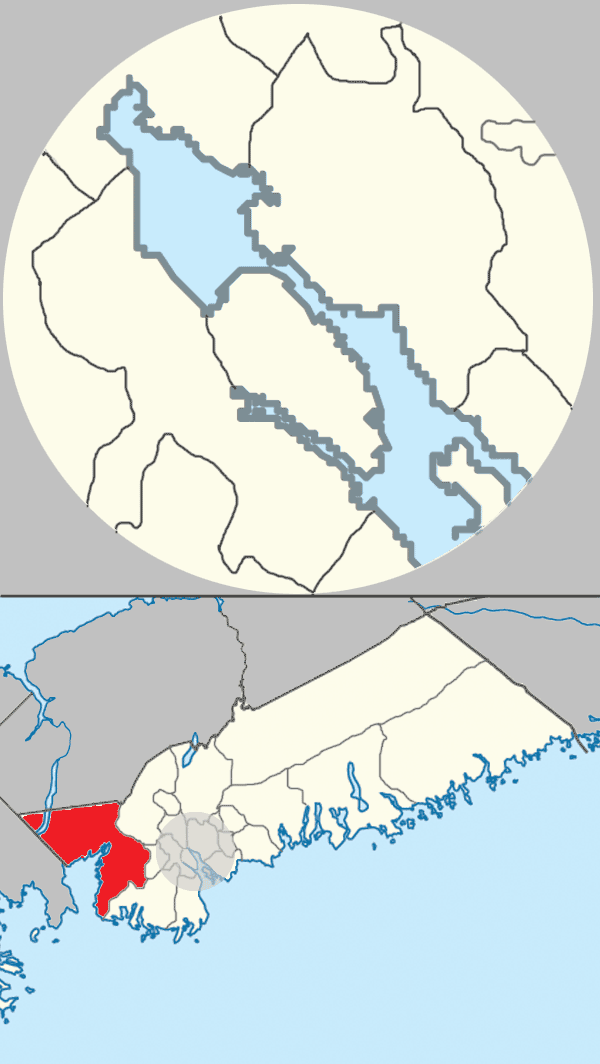
- Location of St. Margarets Bay planning area of municipal Halifax.

- Location within Nova Scotia
- Coordinates: 44.6444°N 63.6762°W
- Country: Canada
- Province: Nova Scotia
- Municipality: Halifax Regional Municipality
- Founded: 1612 (Head of St. Margarets Bay)
- Communities: Black Point, Boutiliers Point, French Village, Glen Haven, Glen Margaret, Hackett's Cove, Head of St. Margaret's Bay, Hubbards, Hubley, Indian Harbour, Ingramport, Lewis Lake, Peggys Cove, Queensland, Seabright, Simms Settlement, Tantallon, Upper Tantallon

Government
  - Council: Western Region Community Council
- Time zone: UTC−4 (AST)
  - Summer (DST): UTC−3 (ADT)
- Area code: 902
- Part of a series about Places in Nova Scotia

St. Margaret's Bay is the westernmost administrative planning district of the Halifax Regional Municipality in the Canadian province of Nova Scotia.

It is a rural area located on the southwestern part of Halifax County comprising those communities in the county located on the eastern and northern shores of St. Margaret's Bay through to the county line, terminating at the community of Hubbards. It borders on Hants County to the north and on Lunenburg County to the west.
