= Nova Scotia Route 331 =

Highway in Nova Scotia, Canada

Route 331

Route information
- Maintained by Nova Scotia Department of Transportation and Infrastructure Renewal
- Length: 57 km (35 mi)

Major junctions
- South end: Hwy 103 in Mill Village
- Trunk 3 in Bridgewater
- North end: Route 325 in Bridgewater

Location
- Country: Canada
- Province: Nova Scotia
- Counties: Queens County, Lunenburg

Highway system
- Provincial highways in Nova Scotia; 100-series
← Route 330	→ Route 332

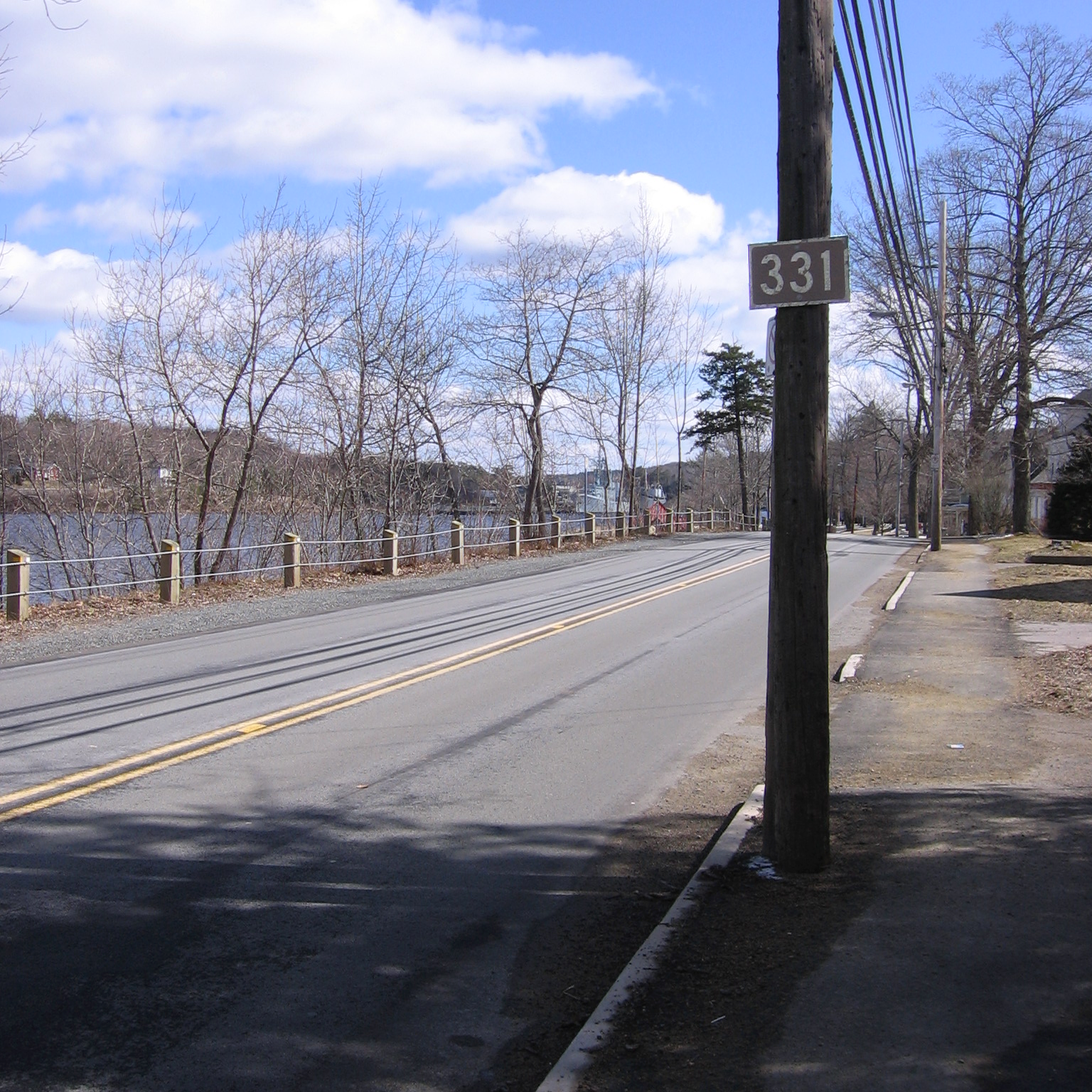
Route 331 outside Bridgewater beside the Lahave River.

Route 331 is a collector road in the Canadian province of Nova Scotia.

It is located on the province's South Shore, connecting Mill Village at Highway 103 with Bridgewater at Route 325.

== Communities ==
- Mill Village
- East Port Medway
- Vogler's Cove
- Cherry Hill
- Broad Cove
- Petite Rivière
- Crescent Beach
- West Dublin
- Dublin Shore
- LaHave
- Pentz
- West LaHave
- Pleasantville
- Conquerall Bank
- Bridgewater

== Parks ==
- Rissers Beach Provincial Park

== History ==
The entirety of Collector Highway 331 was once designated as Trunk Highway 31.

== See also ==
- List of Nova Scotia provincial highways
