= Nova Scotia Trunk 10 =

Highway in Nova Scotia, Canada

Trunk 10

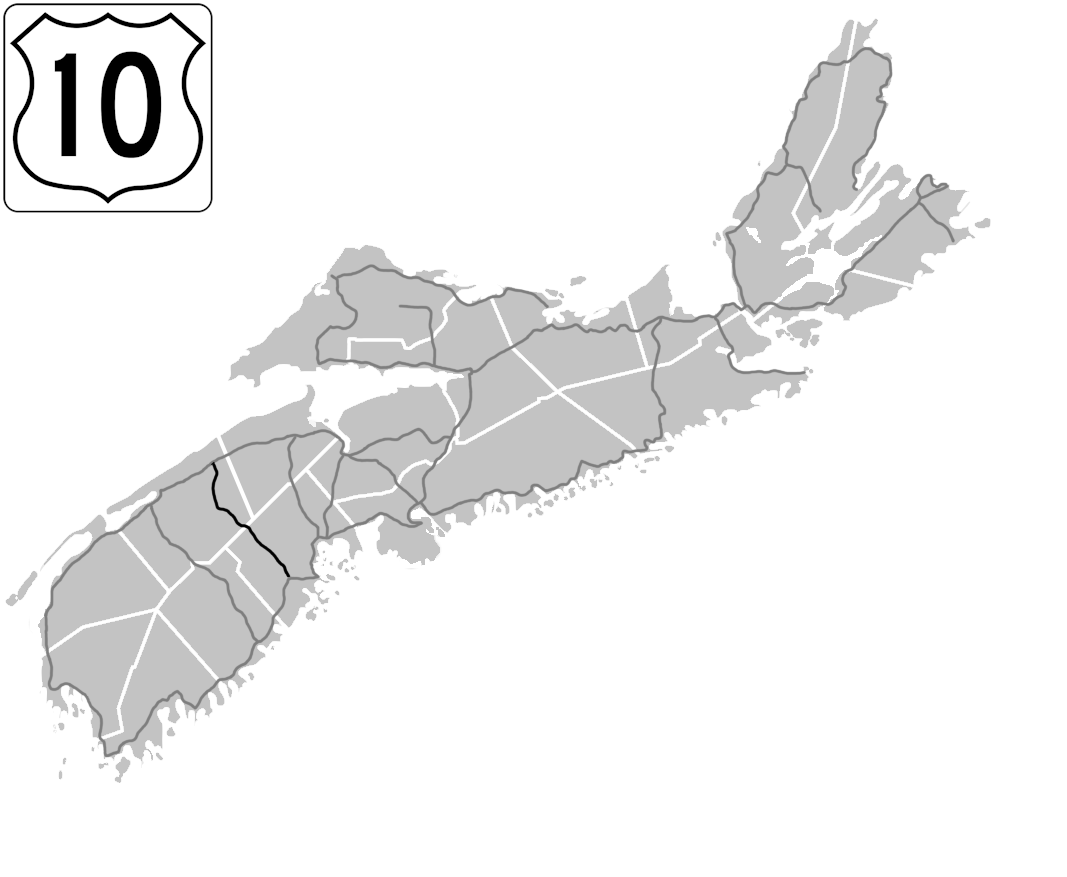

Route information
- Maintained by Department of Transportation and Infrastructure Renewal
- Length: 88.2 km (54.8 mi)

Major junctions
- South end: Route 325 in Bridgewater
- Hwy 103 in Bridgewater
- North end: Trunk 1 in Middleton

Location
- Country: Canada
- Province: Nova Scotia
- Counties: Lunenburg, Annapolis
- Towns: Bridgewater, Middleton

Highway system
- Provincial highways in Nova Scotia; 100-series
← Trunk 8	→ Trunk 12

Trunk 10 is part of the Canadian province of Nova Scotia's system of Trunk Highways. This rural road runs from Bridgewater to Middleton, a distance of 88 kilometres (55 mi).

== Route description ==
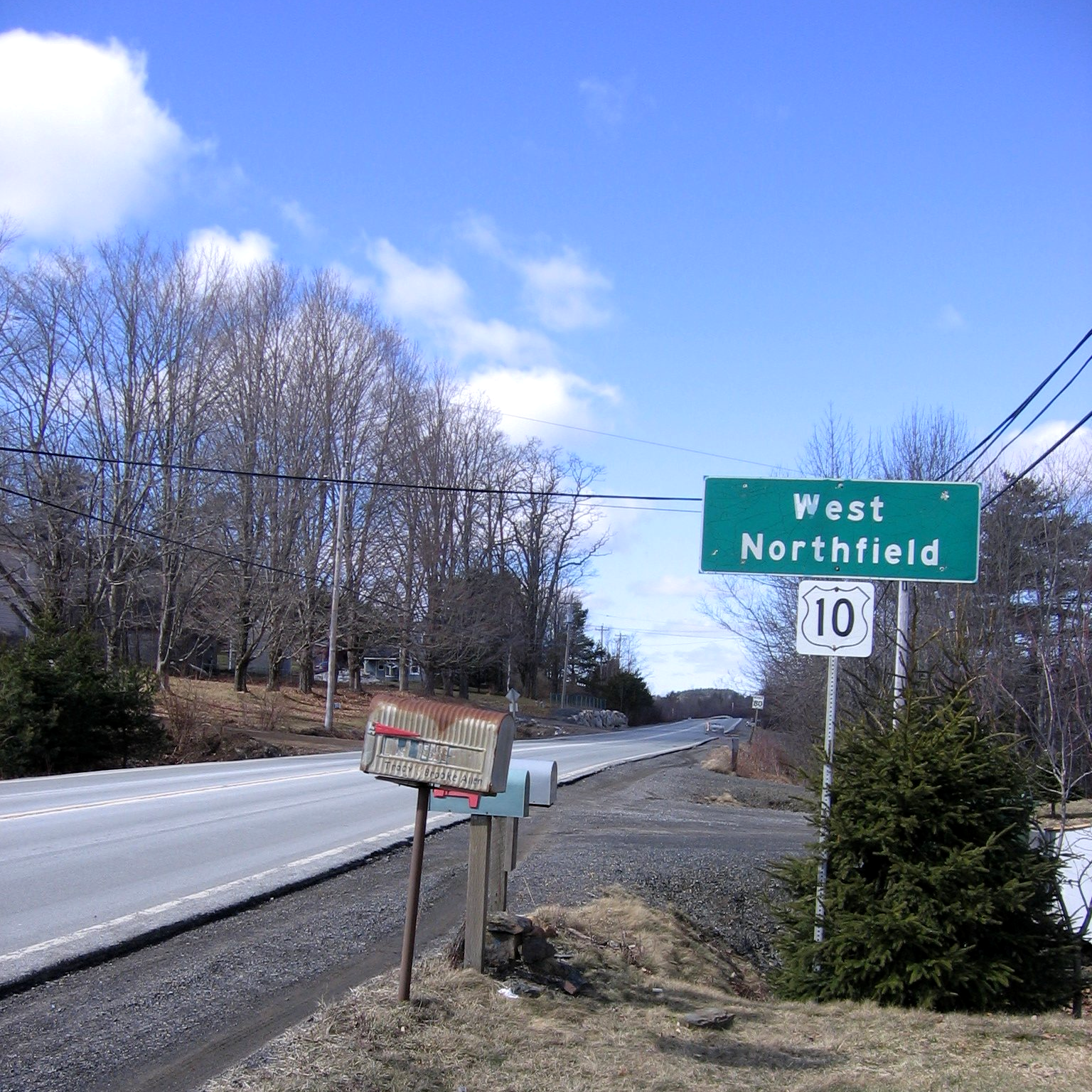
View of Route 10 as it passes through West Northfield.

From Bridgewater, Trunk 10 runs in a northwesterly direction along the east bank of the LaHave River through Northfield and the village of New Germany, crossing the river near Cherryfield at the community of Meiseners Section. The route continues northwest by lakes, forests, Christmas tree farms, and cottages and through the villages of Springfield and Albany Cross, where it turns north and follows the Nictaux River near its west bank, to the route's end in the town of Middleton.

The section between Springfield and Albany Cross follows the route of the Old Annapolis Road.

== Major intersections ==
County	Location	km	mi	Destinations	Notes
Lunenburg	Bridgewater	0.0	0.0	Glen Allan Drive Route 325 (Aberdeen Road) to Trunk 3 / Route 332 / Route 331 – Mahone Bay, Riverport, Lunenburg	Southern terminus; Trunk 10 follows North Street; roadway continues as Glen Allan Drive
Lunenburg	Bridgewater	1.8	1.1	Hwy 103 – Blockhouse, Halifax, Liverpool, Yarmouth	Hwy 103 exit 12
Lunenburg	New Germany	26.3	16.3	Route 208 west – Caledonia, Kejimkujik National Park	
Lunenburg	Meiseners Section	33.2	20.6	Crosses the LaHave River	
Annapolis	Nictaux	85.5	53.1	Route 201 – Nictaux West, Wilmot	
Annapolis	Middleton	87.6	54.4	Crosses the Annapolis River	
Annapolis	Middleton	88.2	54.8	Trunk 1 (Main Street) to Hwy 101 / Route 362 – Margaretsville, Kingston, Halifax, Lawrencetown, Yarmouth	Northern terminus
1.000 mi = 1.609 km; 1.000 km = 0.621 mi
