= Camperdown, Nova Scotia =

Community in Nova Scotia, Canada

Coordinates: 44°15′49″N 64°36′8″W

Camperdown is an unincorporated community in the Canadian province of Nova Scotia, located in Lunenburg County. Situated southwest of Bridgewater and about 3 kilometres west of Italy Cross, Camperdown is likely named after Lord Viscount Duncan of Camperdown, or possibly the village in Holland where he earned his title after the Battle of Camperdown.

Among the early settlers of Camperdown were Frederick Wincock, James Weagle, and Frederick Wild, arriving in the area sometime before 1829. A school was erected in Camperdown in 1883, and a post office in 1900. Camperdown had a population of 176 people in 1956, mainly employed in farming and lumbering.
