= Seniors' College Association of Nova Scotia =

Canadian community association

- Other name: SCANS
- Established: 2007
- Founders: Association of Dalhousie Retirees and Pensioners
- President: Sharon Reashore
- Vice-president: vacant
- Location: Nova Scotia, Canada
- Website: www.thescans.org
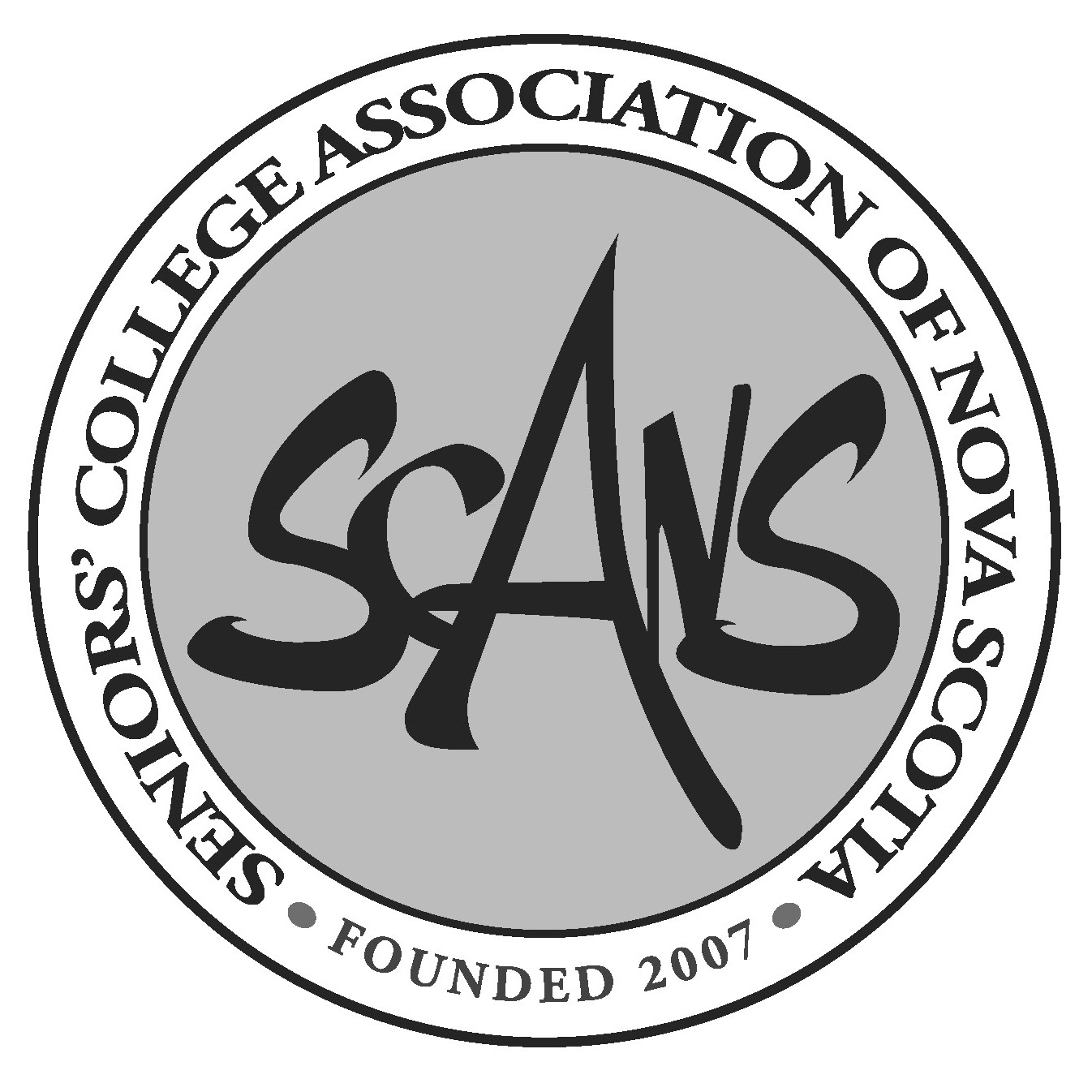

The Seniors' College Association of Nova Scotia (SCANS) is a member-based community association that provides non-credit academic courses to seniors delivered through a number of chapters in various locations of Nova Scotia.

== History ==
The idea of a college for academic learning by seniors in Nova Scotia was first discussed in 2006 by the Association of Dalhousie Retirees and Pensioners (Dalhousie University, Halifax). A task-force was authorized in 2007 with the goal of organizing an academy “modelled on the Seniors College of the University of Prince Edward Island”. The task-force drafted a Memorandum of Association and By-laws for a member-directed, volunteer-based, non-profit organization to provide affordable academic learning opportunities for persons 50 years and older. The Constitution of SCANS was adopted at a general meeting of interested persons on November 16, 2007. Two months later on January 16, 2008, SCANS was incorporated as a registered non-profit society with the Nova Scotia Registry of Joint Stocks. The first classes at SCANS were held in the fall of 2007 with just over 100 participating members who attended any or all of four courses on offer - "Islam, Peace, and Terrorism", "Writing for Life", "Managing Your Money", and "Interpreting the King James Bible as Literature".

== Chapters ==
The central chapter of SCANS, started in 2007, is in the Halifax Regional Municipality, with teaching locations in public libraries, community centres, retirement living residences, and churches distributed in Halifax, Dartmouth, Bedford, Sackville, and Tantallon. Other chapters include Mahone Bay (2010), Truro (2011), Liverpool (2013), and Chester (2013).

== Programs ==
The core program of SCANS is the portfolio of courses delivered through weekly classes in three terms each year. Course subjects range across the natural sciences, the social sciences, and the arts and humanities. The portfolio of courses offered at any term depends on the expertise of instructors, who are engaged on a volunteer basis with a small honorarium. An additional program of SCANS is the regular presentation of special topical lectures to the general public.

== Membership ==
The membership of SCANS increased from about 100 persons at inception in 2007 to about 800 persons in 2019. Based on a 2019 survey of the active membership, there are more women (about 70%) than men (about 30%), and more people in the age category of 70–74 years than any other 5-year age category. As at 2023, the eldest active member is 99 years old.

== Administration ==
SCANS is governed by a member-elected board of directors and administered by a small number of standing committees, such as those responsible inter alia for curriculum, finance, and publicity. Day-to-day administration of member affairs is handled by an office manager.
