= Massacre Island =

Island in Nova Scotia, Canada

Coordinates: 43°54′29″N 64°47′56″W

Massacre Island is an island off the coast of Port Mouton, Nova Scotia, Canada.

Its name is believed to derive from Mi'kmaq natives slaughtering the survivors of a French shipwreck.
