= Middlewood =

Middlewood may refer to:

- Middlewood, South Yorkshire, a suburb of Sheffield, South Yorkshire, England
  - Middlewood Hospital, a former Psychiatric hospital in Middlewood, Sheffield.
- Middlewood, Cheshire, a settlement next to Higher Poynton in Cheshire, England.
  - Middlewood railway station, a railway station on the Stockport to Buxton line in England
  - Middlewood Way, a linear park between Macclesfield and Marple in England
- Middlewood, Cornwall, a village in Cornwall, England
- Middlewood, Herefordshire, a village in Herefordshire, England
- Middlewood, Nova Scotia, Canada
- Middlewood Green, a village in Surrey, England
- Middlewood Scout Camp, a campsite for Scouts and Guides in Worsley, Greater Manchester.
