= Stella Bowles =

Canadian environmentalist

Stella Marguerite Bowles M.S.M. O.N.S.
- Born: Bridgewater, Nova Scotia, Canada
- Known for: Her grade 6 science project brought attention to river pollution in the LaHave River and prompted three levels of government to commit $15 million to clean up the LaHave River
- Awards: Order of Nova Scotia
- Website: twitter.com/stellabowlesearlgrey5.wixsite.com/stellab

Stella Marguerite Bowles ONS MSM is a Canadian environmentalist, writer, and the youngest recipient of the Order of Nova Scotia. Canada also recognized Stella with a Meritorious Service Medal. As an advocate for youth activism, Stella co-wrote a book for children titled My River: Cleaning up the LaHave River with Anne Laurel Carter, Stella gave a TEDx talk about her project on the LaHave River titled Oh poop! It's worse than I thought.

== Early life ==
At age 11, Stella wanted to swim in the LaHave River, but her mother said the water was contaminated by illegal straight pipes that flush unprocessed sewage directly into the river. Her mentor, Dr. David Maxwell, helped her start testing bacteria levels in water samples from the river. Stella drew national attention when she reported the bacterial pollution levels that she measured. Stella's project influenced the allocation of $15.7 million from federal, provincial, and municipal governments to remove the straight pipes by 2023.

She attends school at Dalhousie University.

== Career ==
Stella now presents at conferences and in schools around the world, teaching the youth how to test water in their communities.

Stella is politically active. She spent a day with Elizabeth May at parliament. About meeting with May, Stella said, "[she] felt really great that she took time to talk to me" and understand Stella's advocacy message, which is that "We only have one Earth and it's kind of going downhill right now and a lot of people aren't standing up, and I really want people to know that even if you're 12 or 50 or 80, you can make a difference."

She also introduced Prime Minister Justin Trudeau at a gathering at St. Francis Xavier University.

The LaHave River cleanup project will divert 100 straight pipes per year until 2023 when all of the raw sewage will stop flowing.

Stella has also taken her advocacy abroad beyond Canada.

== Awards ==
- In 2020, Stella was the youngest-ever recipient of the Order of Nova Scotia.
- In 2018, Stella was the only Canadian to win a Young Eco-Hero Awards.
- In 2017, Stella received Canada's Meritorious Service Medal
