= Mill Village, Nova Scotia =

Canadian rural community

Coordinates: 44°8′40.95″N 64°38′55.03″W

Mill Village is a community in the Canadian province of Nova Scotia, located in the Region of Queens Municipality. It developed in relation to the lumber industry. Located inland from the Atlantic coast, Mill Village was the site of Canada's first satellite earth station constructed in the 1960s.

== History ==
Historically developed around logging and lumber, Mill Village lies along the Medway River. It has many old structures related to these industries pre-dating the era of cheap fuel. Many homes in the Mill Village area are well over 180 years old, and trees that were mature before the houses were built. Mill Village has a fire hall, churches, garage, and general store.

Mill Village in Nova Scotia

Mill Village is less than 15 minutes from the town of Liverpool; about 20 minutes from the town of Bridgewater (the largest shopping and commercial center in the region); about 40 minutes from the towns of Lunenburg (designated a World Heritage Site by the United Nations) and Mahone Bay; about an hour and a half from the ferry terminals in Yarmouth and Digby; about an hour and a half from Halifax International Airport; and about an hour from downtown Halifax.

== Area attractions ==
Mill Village is located in a 20-to-30-mile stretch along the southern coast of Queens County that is known as "Coastal Queens". The region, which includes the Medway Bay area, is among the most important ecological areas in Nova Scotia. Coastal Queens includes a host of white sandy beaches, bays and inlets, several Nova Scotia and national parks, a federal wilderness park and bird sanctuary, a number of small fishing villages, and several coastal lighthouses.

The Seaside Adjunct to Kejimkujik National Park at Port Joli, Queens County is among the major attractions in the region. It is about a 35-minute drive from Mill Village.

Closer to Mill Village is Carter's Beach, at Port Mouton, Queens County. The beach is among the most photographed white sandy beaches in the area. This area is among the most popular Nova Scotia sea kayaking routes in Coastal Queens.

The Port Medway Lighthouse Park is about a 10-minute drive from Medway Bay. The park was officially opened in November 2002.

Other outdoor destinations include Thomas Raddall Park (Port Joli), Fort Point Lighthouse Park (Liverpool), and Summerville Beach Provincial Park, (Summerville Center). One of the major events in the region is Privateer Days, held annually in nearby Liverpool during the last weekend in June.

== Climate ==
Climate data for Mill Village (1971–2000)
Month	Jan	Feb	Mar	Apr	May	Jun	Jul	Aug	Sep	Oct	Nov	Dec	Year
Record high °C (°F)	15.6 (60.1)	15.0 (59.0)	23.0 (73.4)	26.1 (79.0)	35.5 (95.9)	35.0 (95.0)	35.0 (95.0)	36.7 (98.1)	31.0 (87.8)	27.5 (81.5)	22.8 (73.0)	16.5 (61.7)	36.7 (98.1)
Mean daily maximum °C (°F)	0.8 (33.4)	1.1 (34.0)	5.2 (41.4)	10.7 (51.3)	16.8 (62.2)	21.8 (71.2)	24.9 (76.8)	25.0 (77.0)	20.5 (68.9)	14.6 (58.3)	9.2 (48.6)	3.5 (38.3)	12.8 (55.0)
Daily mean °C (°F)	−4.6 (23.7)	−4.7 (23.5)	−0.3 (31.5)	5.1 (41.2)	10.3 (50.5)	15.0 (59.0)	18.3 (64.9)	18.4 (65.1)	13.8 (56.8)	8.5 (47.3)	4.2 (39.6)	−1.6 (29.1)	6.9 (44.4)
Mean daily minimum °C (°F)	−10.0 (14.0)	−10.5 (13.1)	−5.8 (21.6)	−0.6 (30.9)	3.7 (38.7)	8.2 (46.8)	11.7 (53.1)	11.7 (53.1)	7.1 (44.8)	2.5 (36.5)	−0.9 (30.4)	−6.7 (19.9)	0.9 (33.6)
Record low °C (°F)	−35.0 (−31.0)	−33.0 (−27.4)	−27.0 (−16.6)	−11.7 (10.9)	−8.0 (17.6)	−2.0 (28.4)	0.0 (32.0)	−1.0 (30.2)	−6.0 (21.2)	−9.4 (15.1)	−18.0 (−0.4)	−30.0 (−22.0)	−35.0 (−31.0)
Average precipitation mm (inches)	149.9 (5.90)	115.0 (4.53)	130.8 (5.15)	135.2 (5.32)	98.8 (3.89)	112.3 (4.42)	89.2 (3.51)	72.8 (2.87)	93.3 (3.67)	122.8 (4.83)	154.7 (6.09)	160.4 (6.31)	1,435.1 (56.50)
Average rainfall mm (inches)	108.9 (4.29)	79.6 (3.13)	107.2 (4.22)	129.6 (5.10)	98.6 (3.88)	112.3 (4.42)	89.2 (3.51)	72.8 (2.87)	93.3 (3.67)	121.8 (4.80)	148.3 (5.84)	137.3 (5.41)	1,298.8 (51.13)
Average snowfall cm (inches)	40.9 (16.1)	35.4 (13.9)	23.6 (9.3)	5.6 (2.2)	0.2 (0.1)	0.0 (0.0)	0.0 (0.0)	0.0 (0.0)	0.0 (0.0)	1.0 (0.4)	6.5 (2.6)	23.1 (9.1)	136.3 (53.7)
Average precipitation days (≥ 0.2 mm)	12.3	10.4	11.9	13.0	13.1	11.9	10.4	9.3	10.1	12.8	13.4	13.9	142.2
Average rainy days (≥ 0.2 mm)	8.0	6.3	9.2	12.7	13.1	11.9	10.4	9.3	10.1	12.8	12.9	11.3	127.8
Average snowy days (≥ 0.2 cm)	5.6	5.0	3.8	0.86	0.05	0.0	0.0	0.0	0.0	0.05	0.76	3.8	19.9
Source: Environment Canada
