= Tantallon, Nova Scotia =

Tantallon
- Suburban Community
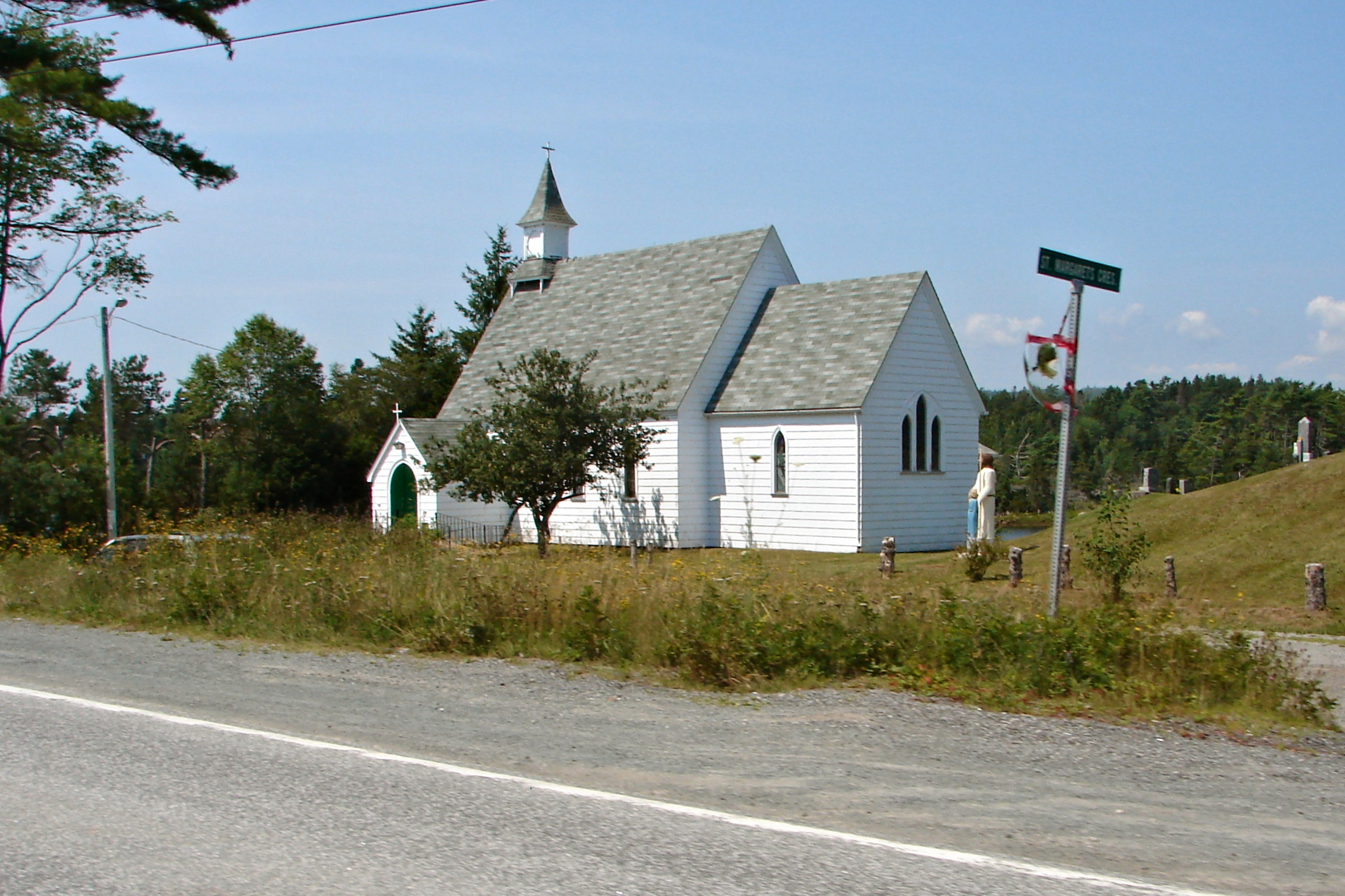
- Interactive map of Tantallon
- Coordinates: 44.6583°N 63.9°W
- Country: Canada
- Province: Nova Scotia
- Municipality: Halifax Regional Municipality
- Community council: Western Region Community Council
- Planning Area: St. Margarets Bay
- Postal code: B3Z
- Area code: 902
- GNBC code: CBLJF

Tantallon (pronounced 'tan-TAL-en') is an exurban community in Halifax Regional Municipality, Nova Scotia, Canada. It extends from about two kilometres south of Trunk 3, along Route 333, just north of Ballfield Road, for roughly three kilometres along Route 333, to just south of Longards road, and includes Whynachts Point and Sheeps Head Island. It is bordered to the north by Upper Tantallon and to the south by Glen Haven. The community is about 32 km (20 mi) from Downtown Halifax.

The community is likely named for Tantallon Castle in Scotland.

== 2008 fire ==
On June 13, 2008, a forest fire broke out causing minor damage to two homes and burning 130 acres (53 ha). The fire was believed to have been caused by a campfire. The Royal Canadian Mounted Police laid no charges. It was determined that remnant fallen debris of Hurricane Juan fueled the fire.

== 2023 wildfire ==
On May 28, 2023, a major wildfire broke out in Tantallon. As of May 29, the fire was approximately 788.3 hectares (1,948 acres) hectares in size.
