= Hebbville, Nova Scotia =

Hebbville
- Village
- Location of Hebbville in Nova Scotia
- Coordinates: 44°20′49.83″N 64°32′9.32″W
- Country: Canada
- Province: Nova Scotia
- Municipality: Lunenburg County
- Incorporated: 1978

Government
  - Village Chair: Vernon Cornish
  - Village Committee: The Village Commissioners of Hebbville

Area
  - Total: 15.79 km^{2} (6.10 sq mi)
- Elevation: 71 m (233 ft)

Population (2021)
  - Total: 796
  - Density: 50.4/km^{2} (131/sq mi)
- Time zone: UTC−4 (AST)
  - Summer (DST): UTC−3 (ADT)
- Canadian Postal Code: B4V 2W3
- Area code: 902
- Telephone Exchange: 543

Hebbville (2021 pop. 796) is an incorporated village bordering the town of Bridgewater in Lunenburg County, Nova Scotia, Canada. The village borders many other unincorporated communities as well as Fancy Lake on its southern border.

== History ==
Hebbville is named after the Hebb family, whose name is still prominent in the area today. Until about one hundred years ago, it was known as Hebbs Mills because of three mills owned by the Hebb family and powered by the water flowing out of Hebb Lake (now the Town of Bridgewater water supply) to Fancy Lake.

== Present day ==
The small commercial base of the village is based in farming and automobiles. Both of the major farming entities are owned by the Hebb families (who are distantly related). "Indian Garden Farms" is located off Highway #3 up the hill from the cemetery and they grow a wide variety of fruit and vegetable crops for the local market. Bordering them, but located on the Conquerall Mills Rd, is another Hebb family farm and they specialize in greenhouse plants & are known as Stewart Hebb's Greenhouses where their claim is that they are the oldest Hebb farm in Nova Scotia, having worked the same piece of land since the late 18th century. An auto row is located just outside Bridgewater town limits on Dufferin St (known as Highway #3 once in Hebbville) and is populated with dealers such as Ford, Volkswagen and Hyundai.

The village has one school, Hebbville Academy, serving grades PP-9 with student population of 687. The school was constructed in 1997 and offers students a wide variety of modern teaching aides. It also serves as a collector school for much of the western part of the county.

Hebbville is also seeing much growth in subdivisions as people in Bridgewater look for areas where the tax rate is lower. Much new housing is in the planning stages along the William Hebb Road in particular, which borders town limits.

== Demographics ==
In the 2021 Census of Population conducted by Statistics Canada, Hebbville had a population of 796 living in 334 of its 352 total private dwellings, a change of −0.7% from its 2016 population of 802. With a land area of 15.79 km^{2} (6.10 sq mi), it had a population density of 50.4/km^{2} (130.6/sq mi) in 2021.
