= Nova Scotia Route 324 =

Highway in Nova Scotia, Canada

Route 324

Route information
- Maintained by Nova Scotia Department of Transportation and Infrastructure Renewal
- Length: 11 km (6.8 mi)

Major junctions
- South end: Trunk 3 in Lunenburg
- Route 332 in Lilydale; Route 325 in Blockhouse
- North end: Hwy 103 in Blockhouse

Location
- Country: Canada
- Province: Nova Scotia
- Counties: Lunenburg

Highway system
- Provincial highways in Nova Scotia; 100-series
| ← Route 322 | → Route 325 |

Route 324 is a collector road in the Canadian province of Nova Scotia.

The road is located in Lunenburg County and connects Blockhouse at Highway 103 with Lunenburg at Trunk 3.

== Communities ==
- Lunenburg
- Lilydale
- Northwest
- Fauxburg
- Blockhouse

== Parks ==
- Second Peninsula Provincial Park

== Museum ==
- Lunenburg Fisheries Museum of the Atlantic

== See also ==
- List of Nova Scotia provincial highways
