= Nova Scotia Route 213 =

Highway in Nova Scotia, Canada

Route 213
- Hammonds Plains Road

Route information
- Maintained by Halifax Regional Municipality
- Length: 22 km (14 mi)
- Existed: 1969–present

Major junctions
- West end: Trunk 3 in Upper Tantallon
- Hwy 103 (Exit 5) in Stillwater Lake; Hwy 102 (Exit 3) in Killarney
- East end: Trunk 2 in Bedford

Location
- Country: Canada
- Province: Nova Scotia
- Counties: Halifax Regional Municipality

Highway system
- Provincial highways in Nova Scotia; 100-series
← Route 212	→ Route 214

Route 213 is a collector road in the Canadian province of Nova Scotia. It is located in the Halifax Regional Municipality, connecting Bedford at Trunk 2 (the Bedford Highway) with Upper Tantallon at Trunk 3 with interchanges at Highway 102 and Highway 103 located near the termini.

It is known as the "Hammonds Plains Road."

== Route description ==
From its eastern terminus with the Trunk 2 (Bedford Highway) it is a 2-lane collector road until its junction with Highway 102. Heading west from Highway 102 it is four lanes to Gary Martin Drive with a speed of 50 km/h. From Gary Martin Drive until Pockwock Road, it is a two-lane collector road with a speed limit of 70 km/h. From Pockwock Road until its terminus at Trunk 3 (St. Margaret's Bay Road), it is a two lane limited access road with a speed limit varying between 60 km/h and 80 km/h.

== Communities along Route 213 ==
- Upper Tantallon
- Stillwater Lake
- English Corner
- Hammonds Plains
- West Bedford
- Bedford

== Major intersections ==
The entire route is in Halifax County.

Location	km	mi	Destinations	Notes
Bedford	0.0	0.0	Trunk 2 (Bedford Highway)	
Bedford	1.3	0.81	Hwy 102	Hwy 102 exit 3
Upper Tantallon	16.6	10.3	Hwy 103	Hwy 103 exit 5
Upper Tantallon	18.8	11.7	Trunk 3 (St. Margaret's Bay Road)	
1.000 mi = 1.609 km; 1.000 km = 0.621 mi

== See also ==
- List of Nova Scotia provincial highways
