= Nova Scotia Route 325 =

Highway in Nova Scotia, Canada

Route 325

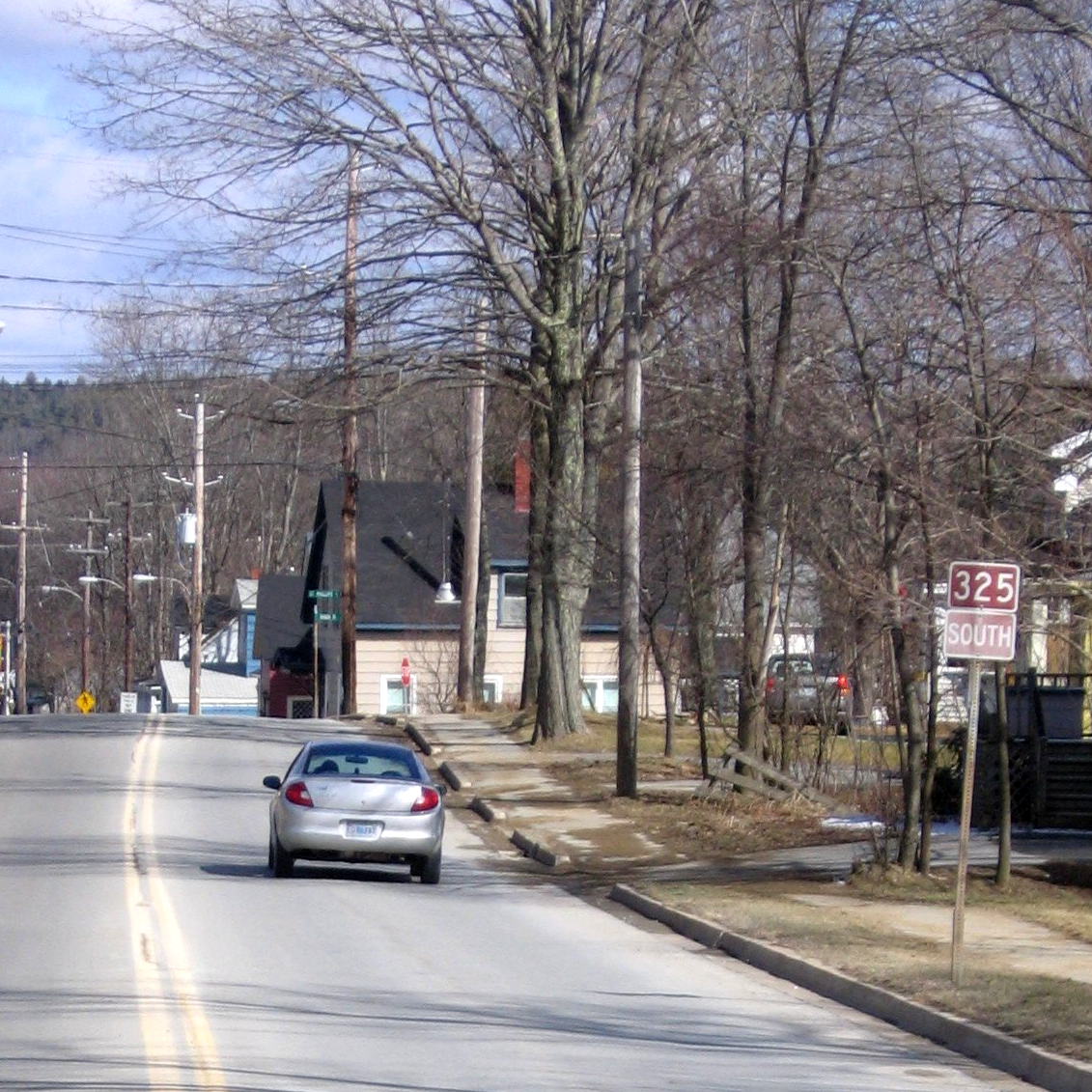
- Route 325 as it passes through Bridgewater, NS. Within the town, it is known as Victoria Road.

Route information
- Maintained by Nova Scotia Department of Transportation and Infrastructure Renewal
- Length: 46 km (29 mi)

Major junctions
- West end: Route 208 in Colpton
- Route 210 in Newcombville; Hwy 103 in Wileville; Trunk 3 / Route 331 in Bridgewater; Route 324 in Blockhouse
- East end: Trunk 3 in Mahone Bay

Location
- Country: Canada
- Province: Nova Scotia
- Counties: Lunenburg

Highway system
- Provincial highways in Nova Scotia; 100-series
← Route 324	→ Route 326

Route 325 is a collector road in the Canadian province of Nova Scotia. It is located in Lunenburg County and connects Colpton at Route 208 with Mahone Bay at Trunk 3.

The route originated as a post road between Halifax and Liverpool, dating from the latter part of the eighteenth century. In 1825, following the construction of a bridge across the Lahave River at present-day Bridgewater, the surveyor George Wightman recommended a change in the alignment between Mahone Bay and the new bridge. This shortened the route (now more or less equivalent to Route 332) that required a ferry crossing at LaHave. The new connection led to the growth of Bridgewater as the main commercial and transportation centre of Lunenburg County.

== Communities ==
- Colpton
- West Clifford
- Bakers Settlement
- Newcombville
- Wileville
- Bridgewater
- Oak Hill
- Whynotts Settlement
- Maitland
- Blockhouse
- Mahone Bay

== Parks ==
- Cookville Provincial Park

== History ==
Trunk 3A
- Location: Bridgewater–Mahone Bay
- Length: 15 km (9.3 mi)

The 15 km (9 mi) section of Collector Highway 325 between Bridgewater and Mahone Bay was once designated as Trunk Highway 3A. It served as a shortcut between the two communities, bypassing a 30 km (19 mi) section of Trunk Highway 3; it was superseded in importance by Highway 103.

== See also ==
- List of Nova Scotia provincial highways
