= Hubley, Nova Scotia =

Hubley
- Location within Nova Scotia
- Coordinates: 44°40′31″N 63°49′19″W
- Country: Canada
- Province: Nova Scotia
- Municipality: Halifax Regional Municipality
- Community council: Western Region Community Council
- Planning Area: St. Margarets Bay

Population (2006 census)
  - Total: 1,029
- GNBC code: CAQYR

Hubley is a residential community within the Halifax Regional Municipality, Nova Scotia on Trunk 3 between Upper Tantallon and Timberlea approximately 15 kilometres from Halifax.

== Communications ==
- The first three digits of the postal code are B3Z
- The telephone exchange is 902 876
- Cable Internet access - Eastlink, DSL - Aliant

== Overview ==
- Total population 1029
- Total dwellings 348
- Total land area: 57.4445 km^{2}
- Many lakes in the area
- Hubley is primarily composed of three subdivisions: Lake of the Woods, Sheldrake Lake and Three Brooks. Lake of the Woods, Sheldrake Lake and Three Brooks are affluent communities. There are several parks and hiking trails in the area.
- Other areas of Hubley include Birch Bear Woods and Five Island Lake Estates, which are smaller areas located near Three Brooks.
- The former Sir John A. Macdonald High School (1969) is located in Hubley. In 2006, a new high school was opened in Tantallon and the building in Hubley became Five Bridges Junior High School.
- The BLT Trail runs through Hubley, primarily parallel to St Margaret's Bay Road.

== Area Lakes ==
- Sheldrake Lake
- Upper Sheldrake Lake
- Fredrick Lake
- Big Hubley Lake
- Five Island Lake
