= Charleston, Nova Scotia =

Community in Nova Scotia, Canada

Coordinates: 44°9′45.02″N 64°40′28.03″W

Charleston in Nova Scotia

Charleston is a community in the Canadian province of Nova Scotia, located in the Region of Queens Municipality.

Robert (Bobby) Millard lived in Charleston from 1929 to 1939 in the Netson MacKinnon house, just below the bridge on the Medway River. At that time, the population was about 150 people, about 20 of whom worked in the pulp mill just above the MacKinnon home.
