= Cookville, Nova Scotia =

Community in Nova Scotia, Canada

Coordinates: 44°24′41.28″N 64°33′7.41″W

Cookville in Nova Scotia

Cookville is a community in the Canadian province of Nova Scotia, located in Lunenburg Municipal District in Lunenburg County.

== Parks ==
- Cookville Provincial Park
