= Chester Basin, Nova Scotia =

Community in Nova Scotia, Canada

Coordinates: 44°33′59.18″N 64°18′17.17″W

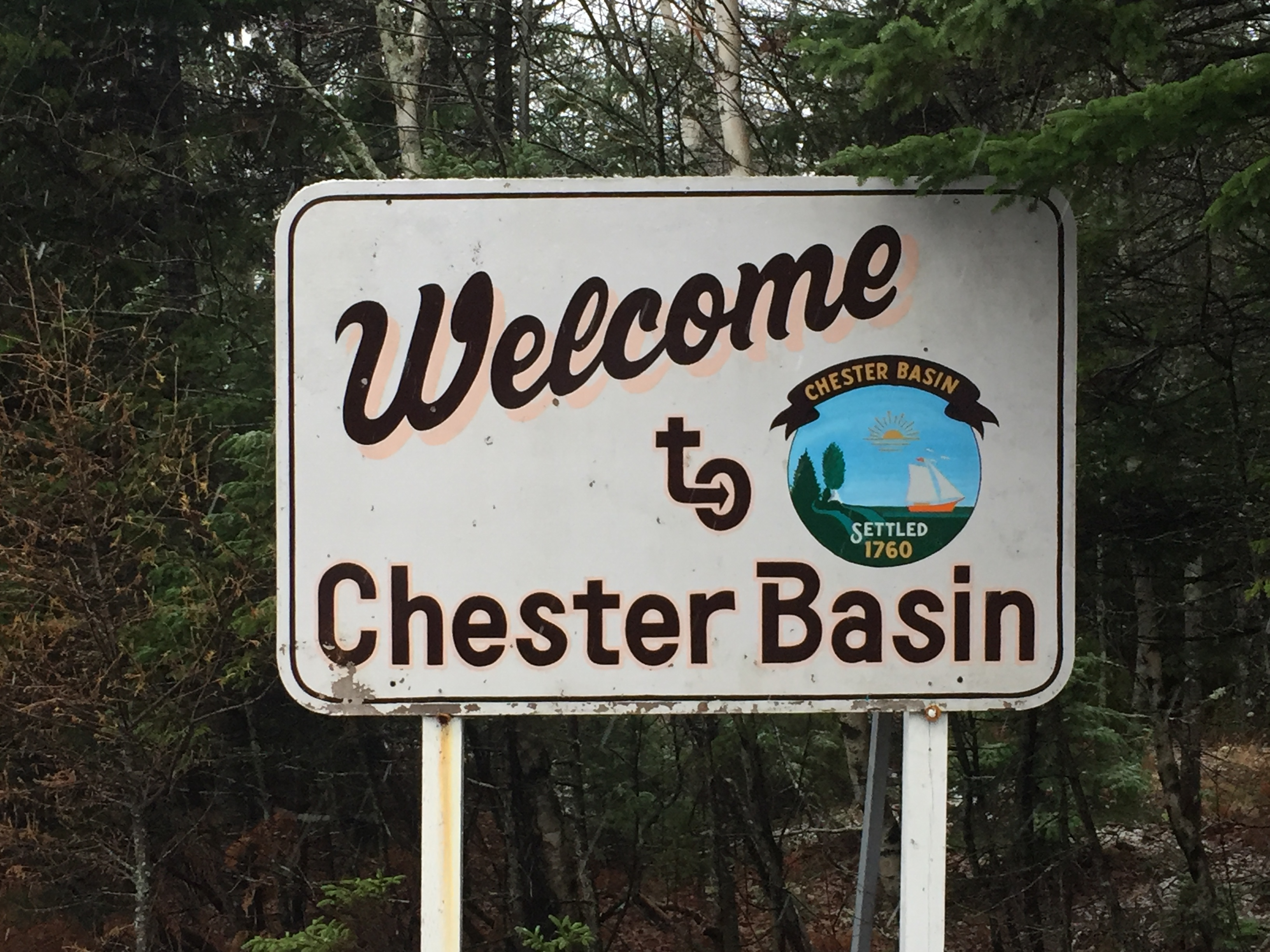
Welcome to Chester Basin sign located on Hwy 12

Chester Basin in Nova Scotia

Chester Basin is a Canadian rural community located on the South Shore of Nova Scotia, Canada. It is one of the communities that makes up District 4 of the Municipality of the District of Chester. It had a population of just over 2,000 residents in 2001.

Named after its founder, Clarence Chester, its name was brought about by the famous saying coined by Chester; "The world is your basin", and consequently the settlement was originally named Chester's Basin after the influence Chester amongst the local people. It is located on the shores of Lunenburg County, Nova Scotia. Road access is provided by Trunk 3 and Trunk 12.

== Amenities ==
Chester Basin is a small town but does contain a few small entities within its limits which include Chester Basin Post Office and Chester Basin Animal Hospital.

== Chester Basin Legion ==
The legion located in Chester Basin is Everett Branch #88 of the Royal Canadian Legion located at 25 Highway #12. The legion hosts regular events which include TGIFs every Friday night, Newfie Breakfasts ever fourth Saturday and Annual Christmas Craft Fair.

== Churches ==
Chester Basin has one church located at 57 Highway 12, the Aenon Baptist Church.

== Parks ==
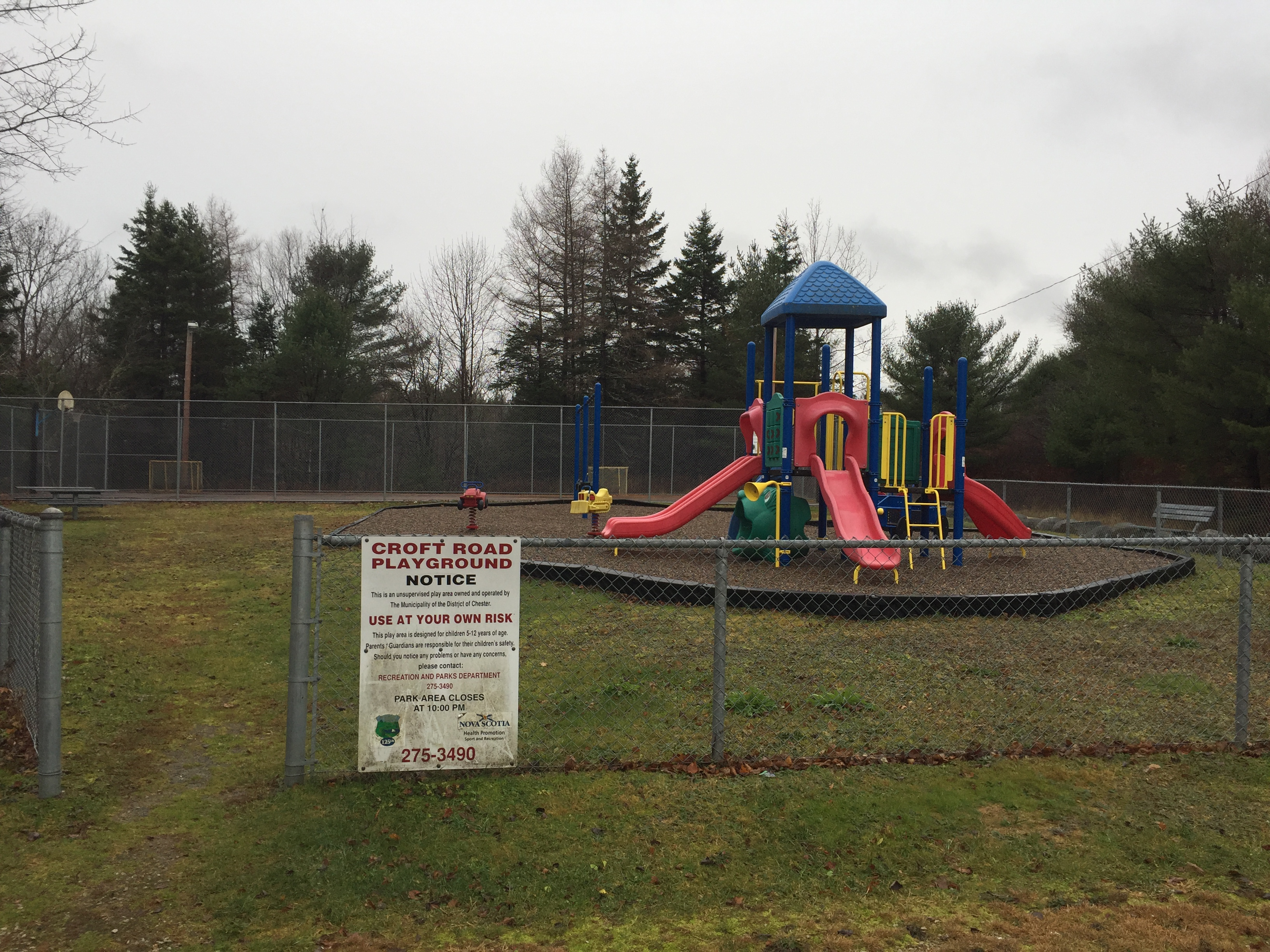
Croft Road Playground, Chester Basin

There are four parks located in Chester Basin which include a playground and an outdoor green gym.

Anvil Park is located in the heart of the community with history as the area's blacksmith shop, a stream and a monument . There is an annual Christmas tree lighting that takes place at Anvil Park and the tree is displayed so it can be seen by many.

Croft Road Playground is located at 25 Croft Road in Chester Basin. It was completely renovated in 2004 with new play equipment and a fenced outdoor basketball/ground hockey court. The playground is also next to the rails to trails which run throughout the community and into other surrounding communities.

Green Gym Park is located across from the playground and includes five different stations of exercise equipment.

Legacy Park is located next to the Chester Basin Legion and was unveiled in 2014 to commemorates the 250th anniversary of Chester Basin in 2010, the park represents the gold mining, tree farming and other heritage from the area.

== 250th anniversary ==
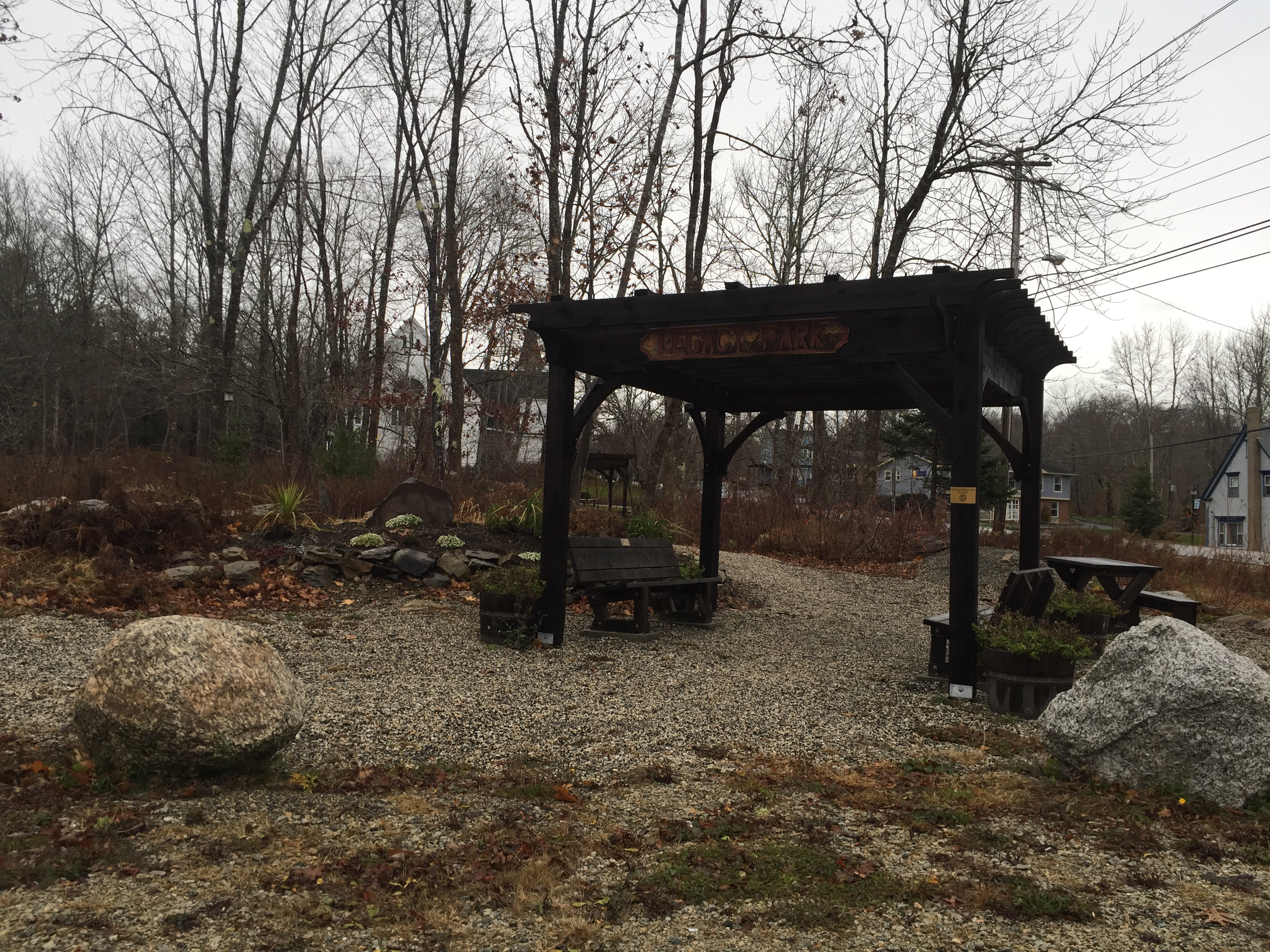
Legacy Park, Chester Basin

In 2010 Chester Basin celebrated its 250th anniversary as it was settled in 1760. Legacy Park mentioned above was opened in 2014 to commemorate this anniversary to remember and represent the heritage of the area.
