= Middlewood, Nova Scotia =

Community in Nova Scotia, Canada

Coordinates: 44°13′23.79″N 64°34′20.8″W

Middlewood in Nova Scotia

Middlewood is a community in the Canadian province of Nova Scotia, located in the Lunenburg Municipal District in Lunenburg County.
