= Port Joli, Nova Scotia =

Community in Nova Scotia, Canada

Coordinates: 43°51′54″N 64°52′14″W

Port Joli in Nova Scotia

Port Joli is a community in the Canadian province of Nova Scotia, located in the Region of Queens Municipality. It is about 20 miles from Liverpool, Nova Scotia, the nearest significant town, and 120 miles from Halifax, Nova Scotia, the provincial capital. Port Mouton is about midway between Port Joli and Liverpool. The village's name, Port Joli, comes from the French joli, meaning "pretty."

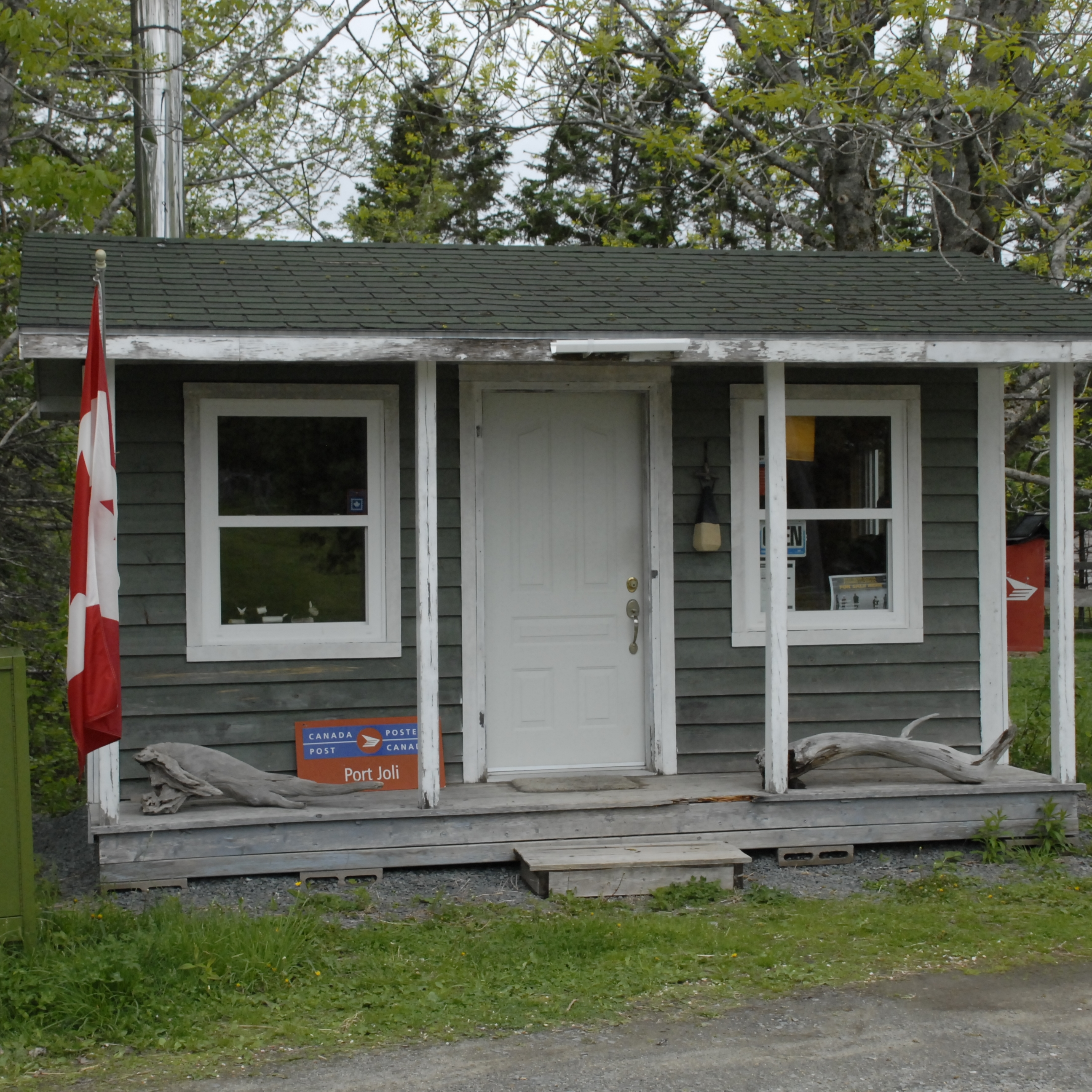
Port Joli post office

The major attraction in Port Joli is the Seaside Adjunct to Kejimkujik National Park, the entrance to which is located about three miles down St. Catherine's Road, which runs from Route 3 to the sea. From there, a footpath leads through forest and brush to the beach at Cadden Bay. Most of Port Joli's homes are only occupied during the summer months, and the majority of those who do live there year-round are retired. The only public facilities are a United Church of Canada, recently closed and sold, a small general store(also closed), a post office(also closed)and a community hall, heritage building still being used. The fishing wharf at the end of St. Catherine's Road was closed in the mid-1990s; a rock breakwater now exists in its place. The few remaining fishermen work from nearby Port L'Herbert and Port Mouton.

Well-known American violist Walter Trampler died here in 1997. Movie star Dudley Moore often summered here.

== Parks ==
- Kejimkujik National Park
- Thomas H. Raddall Provincial Park
- Port Joli Federal Migratory Bird Sanctuary(CWS)
- Nature Conservancy of Canada Reserves
- Peppered Moon Provincial Reserve
