= Boutiliers Point, Nova Scotia =

Community in Nova Scotia, Canada

Boutiliers Point
- Location within Nova Scotia
- Coordinates: 44°39′34″N 63°57′10″W
- Country: Canada
- Province: Nova Scotia
- Municipality: Halifax Regional Municipality
- Community council: North West Community Council
- District 13: 13 - Hammonds Plains - St. Margarets
- Founded: 1752

Population (2021 census)
  - Total: 781
- Postal code: B3Z
- Area Code: 902
- GNBC code: CAEUL

Boutiliers Point (English: /ˈbuːtɪlɪərs/) is a rural community in the Halifax Regional Municipality on the shore of the Atlantic Ocean on Trunk 3, 27.61 kilometers from Halifax.

The original European settlers in Boutiliers Point were mostly Protestants from France. They were given grants of land under the condition that they would settle permanently in the area.

The community evolved after Jacques Boutilier's son, James Frederick and Jacques' nephew John Coulaw Boutilier *purchased on September 20, 1794 from Charles Ingram's son-in-law, William Coolen, the 1500 acre Ingram Grant for 140 pounds, to be paid 20 pounds yearly. This area later became known as Boutilier's Point, likely named for James Frederick Boutilier, a patriarch of the community.

Many in the community have the last name of Boutilier /ˈbuːtlɪər/. It is common that one is referred to by one's first name followed by the name of one's father (e.g., Tom the son of Eric Boutilier becomes Tom Eric).

Boutiliers Point is home to the Willard Christie Memorial Park, which includes a playground, located at the top of Christie's Road and Island View Drive, and a baseball pitch located down a short driveway, which is frequented by dog walkers. There is also an outdoor ice rink that is a hot spot for hockey players in the winter months.

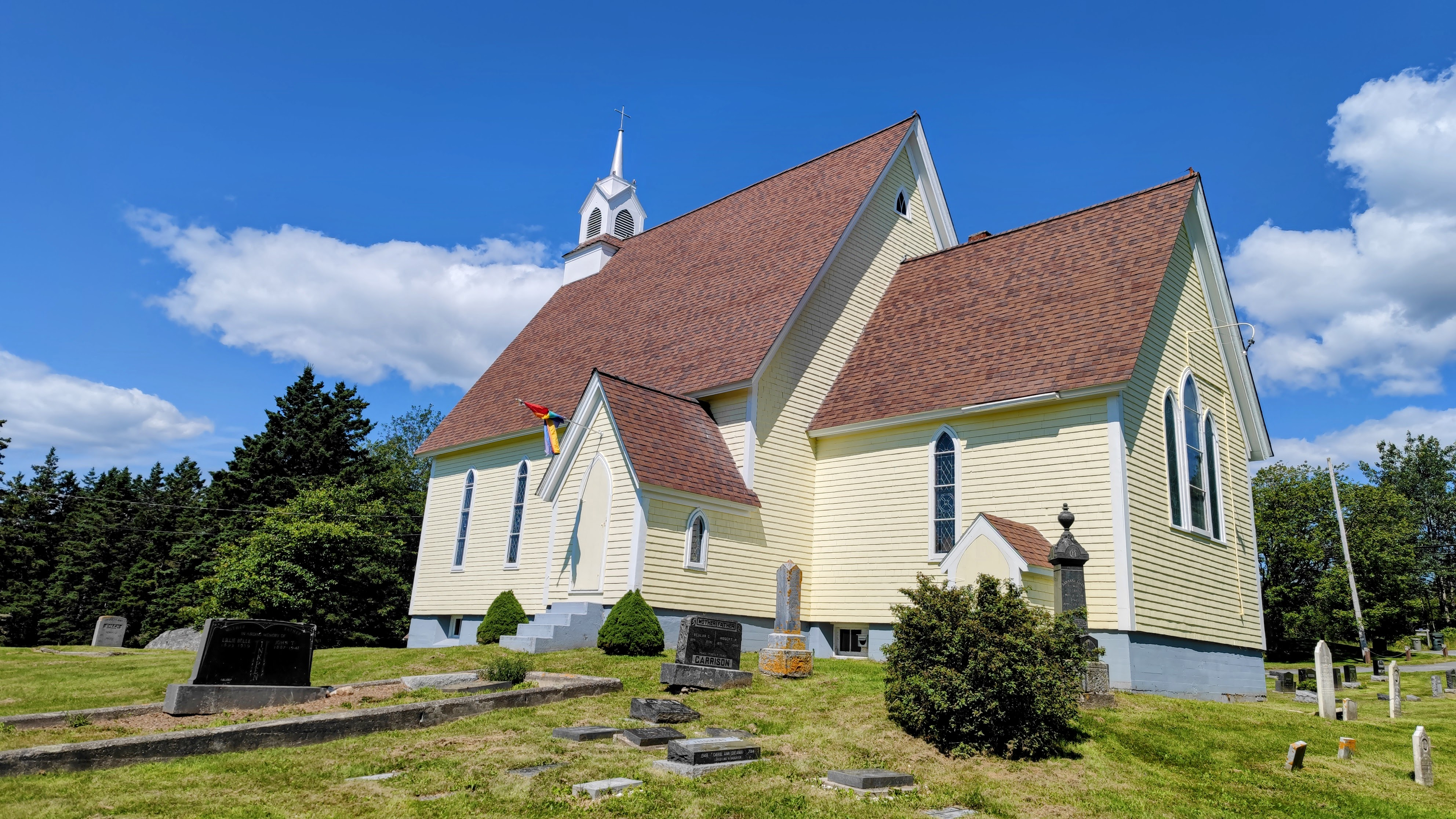
St. James Anglican Church, Boutilier's Point, July 2023

The St. James Anglican Church, consecrated in 1848, is located in Boutiliers Point. It was the first church built on the west side of St. Margaret's Bay, Nova Scotia. It was originally built 40 ft by 30 ft with a capacity of up to 250 people. The earliest gravestone from the cemetery is dated 1854. The church is part of The Anglican Parish of French Village. There was a St. James' school in operation during the 19th century. It burned down in 1893 and was rebuilt the following year.

== Bay Lookout Park ==
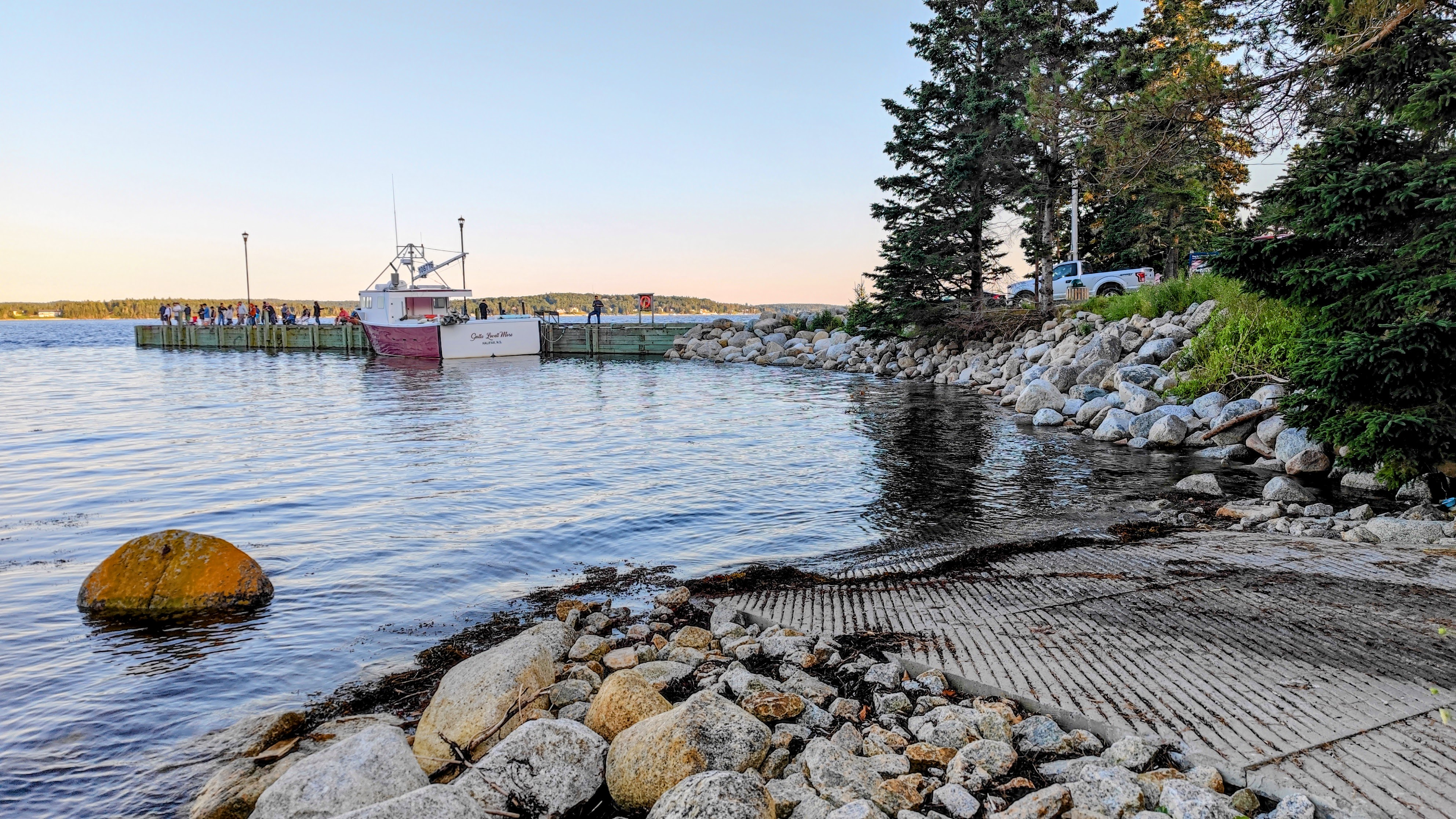
Bay Lookout Park, Boutilier's Point, Nova Scotia, July 2023

The main attraction in Boutiliers Point is the Bay Lookout Park. The park includes a small beach and a wharf used in the summer months for mackerel and squid fishing, a dock for a few lobster fishing boats, and a boat launch. The wharf was originally built by the federal government to be part of a research station. The research station was never built.

In the late 1990s, the federal government of Canada sought to divest this wharf as part of a larger asset divestment program. The Bay Lookout Association was founded by local community members to petition the government to transfer the wharf and surrounding land to the municipal government to form a public park. Initially, the proposal met challenges from bureaucratic disagreements between the federal, provincial and municipal levels of government. Negotiations proceeded for years. Finally, The Bay Lookout Park was created by the Halifax Regional Municipality in 1998, with the Bay Lookout Association acting to maintain the park grounds. The wharf was completely rebuilt in 2012 for a cost of approximately $1,000,000. In 2023, the park was being maintained by the Halifax Regional Municipality. A user survey conducted in July 2010 showed that the park is used by people across the Halifax Regional Municipality, as well as tourists from inside and outside the province.

== Demographics ==
In the 2021 Census of Population conducted by Statistics Canada, Boutliers Point had a population of 781 living in 359 of its 409 total private dwellings, a change of 2.1% from its 2016 population of 765. With a land area of 2.6 km^{2} (1.0 sq mi), it had a population density of 300.4/km^{2} (778.0/sq mi) in 2021.

In the 2006 Census of Population conducted by Statistics Canada, Boutliers Point had a population of 777. The same census reported a 2001 population of 806.

The population in 1956 was 414.
