= Broad Cove, Nova Scotia =

Community in Nova Scotia, Canada

Coordinates: 44°11′14.55″N 64°29′0.22″W

Broad Cove in Nova Scotia

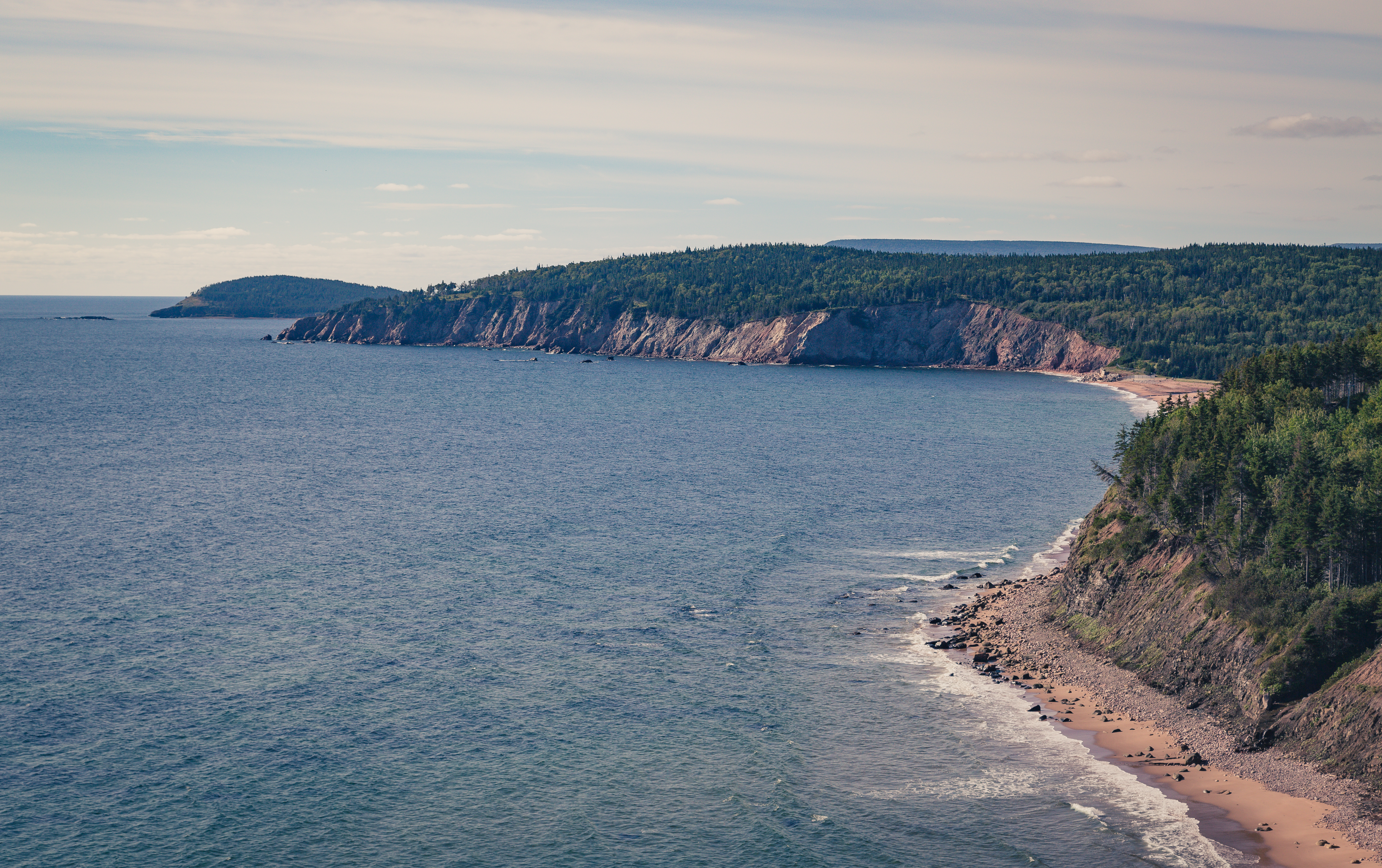
Broad Cove, Nova Scotia

Broad Cove (Scottish Gaelic: An Caolas Leathann) is a community in the Canadian province of Nova Scotia, located in the Lunenburg Municipal District in Lunenburg County.

The community thrives on tourism, especially in the peak summer months. It is served by a community hall where regular community events are held.
