= Wileville, Nova Scotia =

Community in Nova Scotia, Canada

Coordinates: 44°22′18.2″N 64°32′38.37″W

Wileville in Nova Scotia

Wileville is a community in the Canadian province of Nova Scotia, located in the Lunenburg Municipal District in Lunenburg County.

Wileville is named after the Wile family, whose name is still prominent in the area today.
