= Voglers Cove =

Community in Nova Scotia, Canada

- Community
- Location within Canada Location within Nova Scotia
- Coordinates: 44°9′30.83″N 64°31′59.44″W

Population
  - Approximate Population: 200

Voglers Cove is a community in the Canadian province of Nova Scotia, located in Lunenburg County.
