= Hebbs Cross =

Community in Nova Scotia, Canada

Coordinates: 44°18′12.89″N 64°33′50.05″W

Hebb's Cross in Nova Scotia

Hebbs Cross is a community in the Canadian province of Nova Scotia, located in Lunenburg County.
