= Italy Cross, Nova Scotia =

Community in Nova Scotia, Canada

Coordinates: 44°16′0.62″N 64°32′58.76″W

Italy Cross in Nova Scotia

Italy Cross is a community in the Canadian province of Nova Scotia, located in the Lunenburg Municipal District in Lunenburg County.
