= Jordan Falls, Nova Scotia =

Canadian community

Coordinates: 43°49′0″N 65°14′0″W

Jordan Falls in Nova Scotia

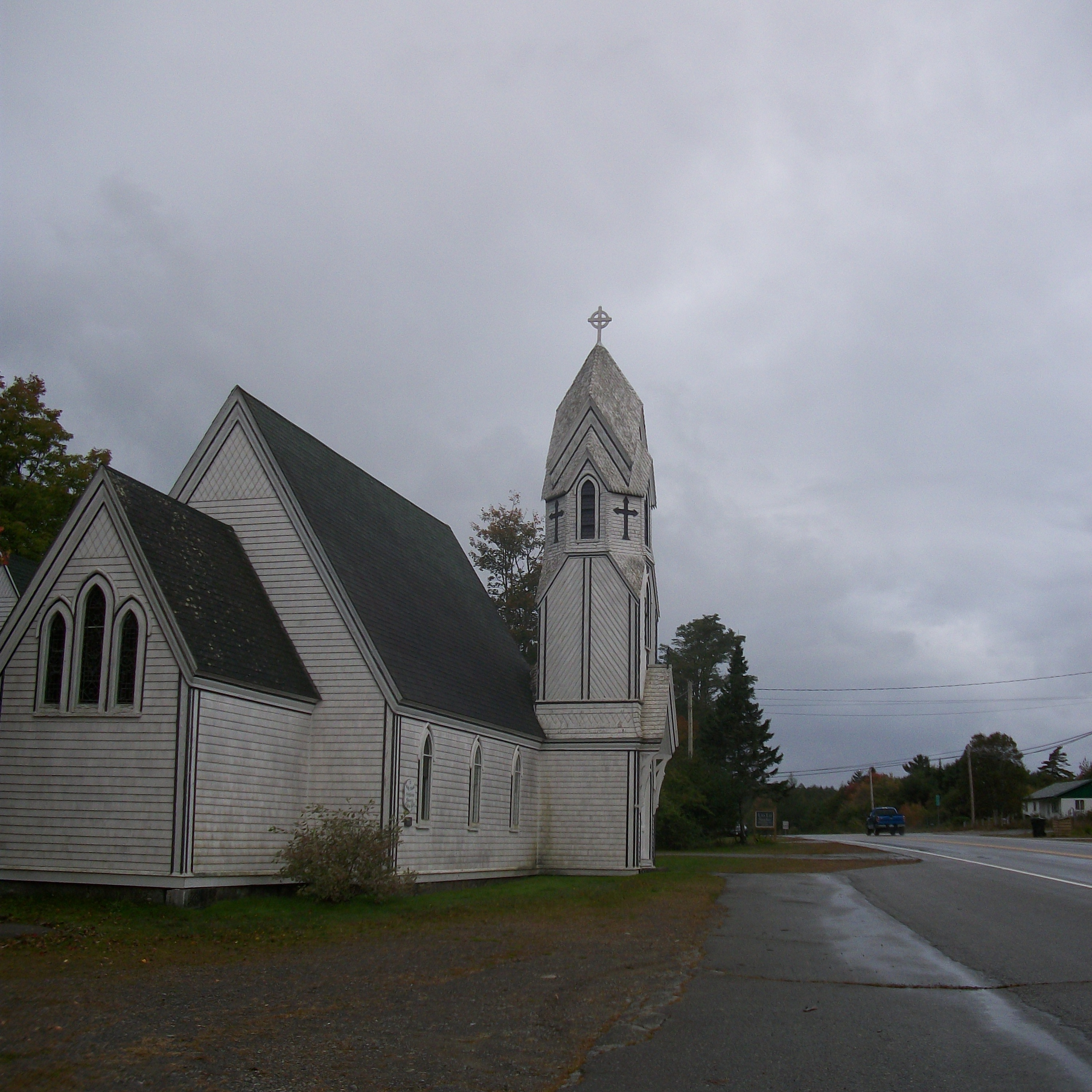
Church beside highway in Jordan Falls, Nova Scotia

Jordan Falls is a community of the Municipality of the District of Shelburne in the Canadian province of Nova Scotia.

Temperate climate. Village on the Jordan River and resulting delta basin: The lands are tidal with substantial marshlands that can be visited by trails starting from several points in the village. Jordan River and delta feeds Jordan Bay. Forests, marshes and fields predominate. Wildlife populate both land and waters. Waterfowl, marshland animals and deer in lower delta. Northern river delta lowly populated and used by hunters and recreationalists.

Aboriginal peoples and acadiennes replaced by US puritans in lower farmlands in 1700s, then mixed settlers, and then loyalists from American revolution in 1776. Jordan Falls rests between Towns of Shelburne and Lockeport. Baptist and Anglicans hold church, cemetery and summer camp properties.

Wood milling, micro-farming, merchants, sports and artists continue long tradition- the noted nineteenth-century shipbuilder and designer Donald McKay came from Jordan Falls. His most famous vessel was the clipper ship Flying Cloud.
