= West LaHave, Nova Scotia =

Community in Nova Scotia, Canada

Coordinates: 44°18′45.18″N 64°24′53.65″W

West LaHave in Nova Scotia

West LaHave is a community in the Canadian province of Nova Scotia, located in the Lunenburg Municipal District in Lunenburg County. The community is the home of St. Peter's Anglican Church.
