= Bridgewater, Nova Scotia =

Bridgewater
- Town
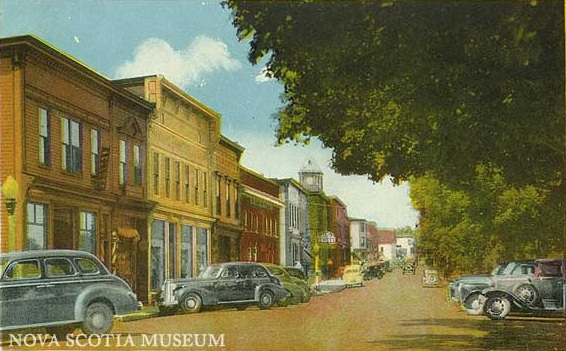
- A postcard showing King Street

- Flag Seal
- Nickname: Main Street of the South Shore
- Location of Bridgewater, Nova Scotia
- Coordinates: 44°22′12″N 64°31′12″W
- Country: Canada
- Province: Nova Scotia
- County: Lunenburg County
- Founded: 1812
- Incorporated: 13 February 1899

Government
  - Body: Bridgewater Town Council
  - Mayor: David Mitchell
  - CAO: Tammy Crowder
  - MLA: Becky Druhan (PC)
  - MP: Jessica Fancy-Landry (LIB)

Area (2021)
  - Total: 13.63 km^{2} (5.26 sq mi)
- Elevation: 22.11 m (72.5 ft)

Population (2021)
  - Total: 8,790
  - Density: 644.9/km^{2} (1,670/sq mi)
- Time zone: UTC−4 (AST)
  - Summer (DST): UTC−3 (ADT)
- Postal code: B4V
- Area code(s): 902 & 782
- Telephone Exchange: 212, 298, 521, 523, 527, 529, 530, 541, 543, 553
- Highways: Hwy 103; Trunk 3 Trunk 10; Route 331; Route 325
- Median Earnings*: $57,200
- NTS Map: 21A7 Bridgewater
- GNBC Code: CAFBR
- Website: www.bridgewater.ca
- Median household income, 2020 ($) (all households)

Bridgewater is a town in Lunenburg County, Nova Scotia, Canada, at the navigable limit of the LaHave River. With a 2021 population of 8,790, Bridgewater is the largest town in the South Shore region.

== History ==
The original inhabitants of the Bridgewater area are the Mi'kmaq people who have lived in the area for thousands of years based on artifacts that have been discovered in the town. Prior to European settlement, the Mi'kmaq used the area where the town now stands as an inland encampment on the edge of the LaHave River.

In 1604 French explorer Pierre Dugua, Sieur de Mons visited the area, and in the mid-1600s there was a small French settlement downriver of the current site at LaHave. The first bridge was built around 1825, and by 1850 the village had a population of 300. Lots were first surveyed in 1874.

Around this time industries were developed using water power from the river, including lumber manufacture, a carding mill, a foundry, a gristmill and a tannery. As the town expanded, it made it more and more difficult for the area's Mi'kmaq inhabitants to maintain their historic way of life.

From 1889 the town was connected by rail to Middleton, and eventually to the rest of the province and Canada via mergers with the Halifax and Southwestern Railway. Passenger service ended in 1976. The railway station, a local landmark, was burned in 1986 and is now the site of fast food outlets. Freight service ended in the early 1990s.

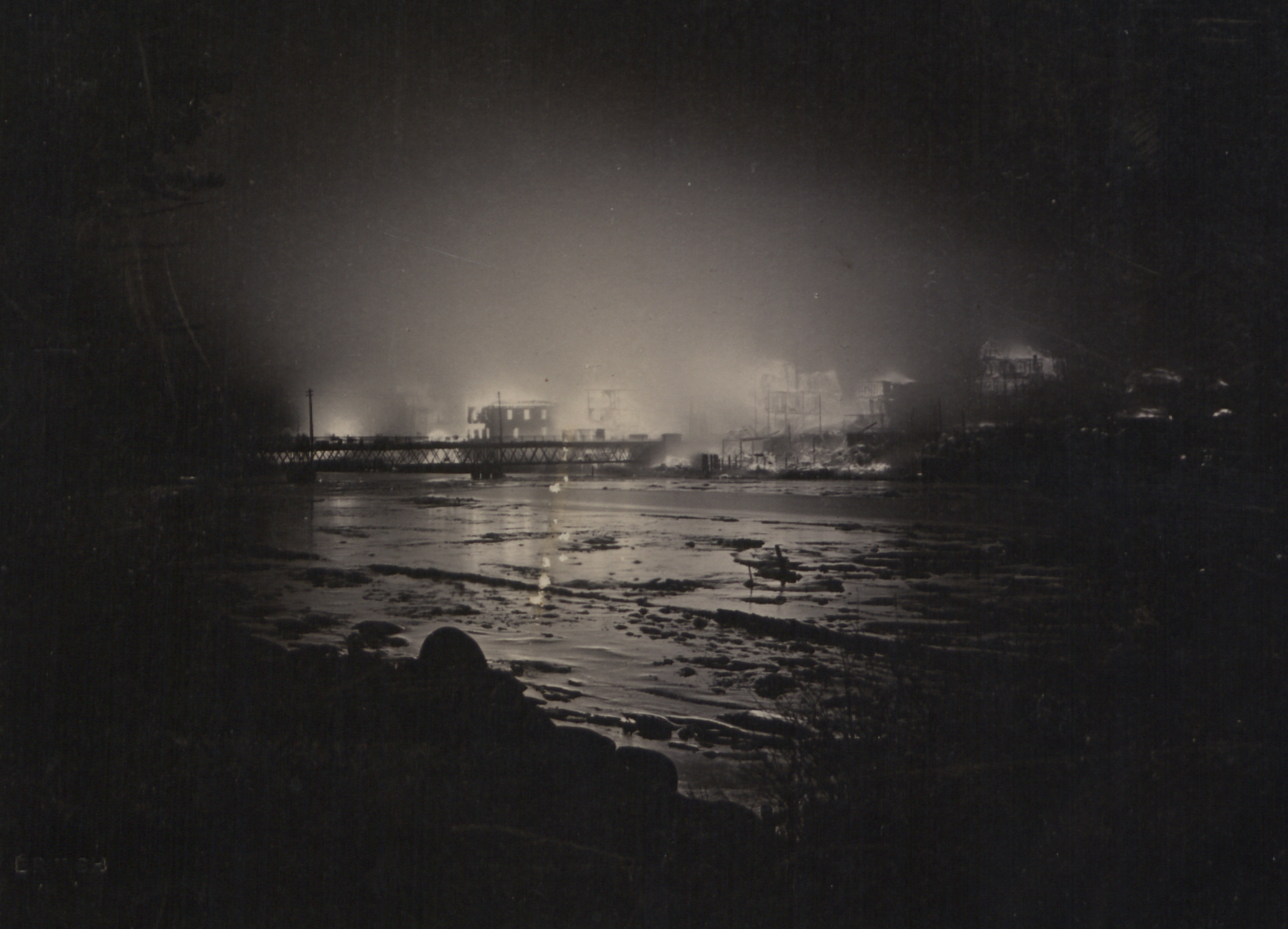
In January 1899 a fire devastated the downtown core

In January 1899 a fire devastated the downtown core. One month later, the town was incorporated.

A lumber mill started by Edward Doran Davison on the site of the present-day South Shore Shopping Centre was in operation during the first two decades of the 1900s.

A major employer in the 1900s was the Acadia Gas Engines company, the largest marine inboard motor manufacturer in Canada. Their two-stroke engines, manufactured entirely in Bridgewater and nicknamed make and break engines, were exported worldwide. Employing over 100 at the King Street plant, the company declined and closed in the 1970s.

In 1971 Michelin opened a tire factory, eventually employing more than 1,000.

The western bank of the LaHave River was the area first settled, and continued to be the commercial and civic heart of the town well into the 20th century. However, since the 1970s, population and economic growth has been stronger on the eastern bank, with the development of shopping malls, new housing, and a regional hospital.

=== Climate ===
Like most of eastern Canada, Bridgewater experiences a humid continental climate (Dfb). The South Shore's proximity to the Atlantic Ocean does serve to moderate the climate, and the region is usually milder than most of Canada during the winter months. Nevertheless, winters are generally cold, damp, and snowy, along with frequent rain. Summers, while less extreme than inland central Canada, are warm to hot and sometimes humid, accented by occasional storms and showers. Autumn and spring are often wildly unpredictable, and snowfall in October and May is not unheard of.

Because it lies inland from the ocean, Bridgewater is usually warmer than coastal Nova Scotia during the summer, reporting far fewer foggy days.

Climate data for Bridgewater, 1981–2010 normals, extremes 1961–present
Month	Jan	Feb	Mar	Apr	May	Jun	Jul	Aug	Sep	Oct	Nov	Dec	Year
Record high °C (°F)	19.5 (67.1)	17.0 (62.6)	28.5 (83.3)	32.0 (89.6)	35.0 (95.0)	35.0 (95.0)	36.0 (96.8)	36.7 (98.1)	34.0 (93.2)	27.8 (82.0)	22.8 (73.0)	18.0 (64.4)	36.7 (98.1)
Mean daily maximum °C (°F)	−0.1 (31.8)	1.1 (34.0)	4.7 (40.5)	10.5 (50.9)	16.8 (62.2)	22.1 (71.8)	25.4 (77.7)	25.2 (77.4)	20.9 (69.6)	14.5 (58.1)	8.5 (47.3)	3.0 (37.4)	12.7 (54.9)
Daily mean °C (°F)	−5.2 (22.6)	−4.3 (24.3)	−0.5 (31.1)	5.0 (41.0)	10.5 (50.9)	15.6 (60.1)	19.0 (66.2)	18.9 (66.0)	14.7 (58.5)	8.9 (48.0)	3.9 (39.0)	−1.7 (28.9)	7.1 (44.8)
Mean daily minimum °C (°F)	−10.4 (13.3)	−9.6 (14.7)	−5.7 (21.7)	−0.5 (31.1)	4.2 (39.6)	8.9 (48.0)	12.6 (54.7)	12.5 (54.5)	8.4 (47.1)	3.2 (37.8)	−0.7 (30.7)	−6.3 (20.7)	1.4 (34.5)
Record low °C (°F)	−32.0 (−25.6)	−33.5 (−28.3)	−29.4 (−20.9)	−13.9 (7.0)	−8.3 (17.1)	−2.2 (28.0)	1.7 (35.1)	−0.5 (31.1)	−5.6 (21.9)	−10.0 (14.0)	−17.5 (0.5)	−28.5 (−19.3)	−33.5 (−28.3)
Average precipitation mm (inches)	143.7 (5.66)	119.5 (4.70)	156.3 (6.15)	127.0 (5.00)	127.5 (5.02)	103.6 (4.08)	96.5 (3.80)	100.0 (3.94)	111.5 (4.39)	137.2 (5.40)	165.2 (6.50)	147.6 (5.81)	1,535.7 (60.46)
Average rainfall mm (inches)	86.2 (3.39)	74.6 (2.94)	118.9 (4.68)	113.1 (4.45)	126.9 (5.00)	103.6 (4.08)	96.5 (3.80)	100.0 (3.94)	111.5 (4.39)	137.1 (5.40)	153.3 (6.04)	114.5 (4.51)	1,336.3 (52.61)
Average snowfall cm (inches)	57.5 (22.6)	45.0 (17.7)	37.4 (14.7)	13.9 (5.5)	0.6 (0.2)	0.0 (0.0)	0.0 (0.0)	0.0 (0.0)	0.0 (0.0)	0.1 (0.0)	11.9 (4.7)	33.1 (13.0)	199.4 (78.5)
Average precipitation days (≥ 0.2 mm)	14.8	13.0	13.8	14.9	15.2	13.1	12.2	11.4	12.2	14.3	16.0	15.3	166.2
Average rainy days (≥ 0.2 mm)	7.8	7.3	9.8	14.1	15.2	13.1	12.2	11.4	12.2	14.3	14.8	10.9	143.1
Average snowy days (≥ 0.2 cm)	10.0	8.3	6.8	2.6	0.16	0.0	0.0	0.0	0.0	0.04	2.3	7.0	37.2
Source: Environment Canada

== Demographics ==
Historical population
Year	Pop.	±%
1901	2,203	—
1911	2,775	+26.0%
1921	3,147	+13.4%
1931	3,262	+3.7%
1941	3,445	+5.6%
1951	4,010	+16.4%
1956	4,445	+10.8%
1961	4,497	+1.2%
1981	6,672	+48.4%
1986	6,617	−0.8%
1991	7,248	+9.5%
1996	7,351	+1.4%
2001	7,621	+3.7%
2006	7,944	+4.2%
2011	8,241	+3.7%
2016	8,532	+3.5%
2021	8,790	+3.0%

In the 2021 Census of Population conducted by Statistics Canada, Bridgewater had a population of 8,790 living in 4,260 of its 4,493 total private dwellings, a change of 3% from its 2016 population of 8,532. With a land area of 13.63 km^{2} (5.26 sq mi), it had a population density of 644.9/km^{2} (1,670.3/sq mi) in 2021.

In 2016, the average age was 46.8 years, over three years above the provincial average. 54% of the population was female, nearly 3% above the provincial average. 5.2% of residents declared themselves as immigrants, with most having arrived in Canada before 1981. Mother tongue was primarily English, with 1.4% reporting French, and 2.7% other. 7.8% were bilingual in French and English.

== Economy ==
Michelin is by far the town's largest employer. The Michelin tire factory in Bridgewater can make up to 7,500 tires per day, and employs more than a quarter of the town's working population. The factory is the centre of Nova Scotia's manufacturing industry. Other major sectors are a call centre, retail, and healthcare.

In 2015, the average household income was $46,836, almost $14,000 below the provincial average.

== Education and health ==
According to the 2016 census, of the town's population ages 25–64, 15.0% had not received a high school diploma while 61.7% had received at least some sort of post secondary degree or certificate. Both figures were slightly worse than the average for Nova Scotia (12.2% and 64.2%, respectively), but significantly better than Lunenburg County (16% and 60.3%) and neighbouring Queens County (20.2% and 51.8%).

== Media ==
Bridgewater is served by CKBW-FM radio, CJHK-FM, the South Shore Breaker, and LighthouseNOW. Established in 1947, CKBW-FM has shifted its music focus several times over the past two decades, and now airs classic hits music. CJHK-FM began operating in 2010 as a sister-station to CKBW, and airs country music. The South Shore Breaker is owned by SaltWire Network and produces a weekly newspaper. The weekly LighthouseNow Progress Bulletin (formerly Bridgewater Bulletin) has been in publication since 1888 and has won numerous awards for its content and lay-out.

== Transportation ==
Since 2008, Bridgewater has supported Active Transportation, which guides policy and infrastructure. The goal is to promote human-powered means of transport as a safe part of everyday life.

Provincial Highway 103 links Bridgewater with Halifax and Yarmouth via two exits, with another under construction. Trunk highways 10 and 3 meet at Bridgewater, and other provincial routes include 325 and 331.

A public transit pilot operation began in 2017, and was made permanent in 2019 due to use exceeding expectations. The town's bus route runs through residential areas and popular destinations once per hour, six days per week. Feasibility studies into public transit between Bridgewater, Lunenburg and Mahone Bay have occurred but have not yet resulted in service.

== Notable residents ==
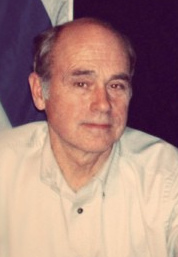
John Dunsworth

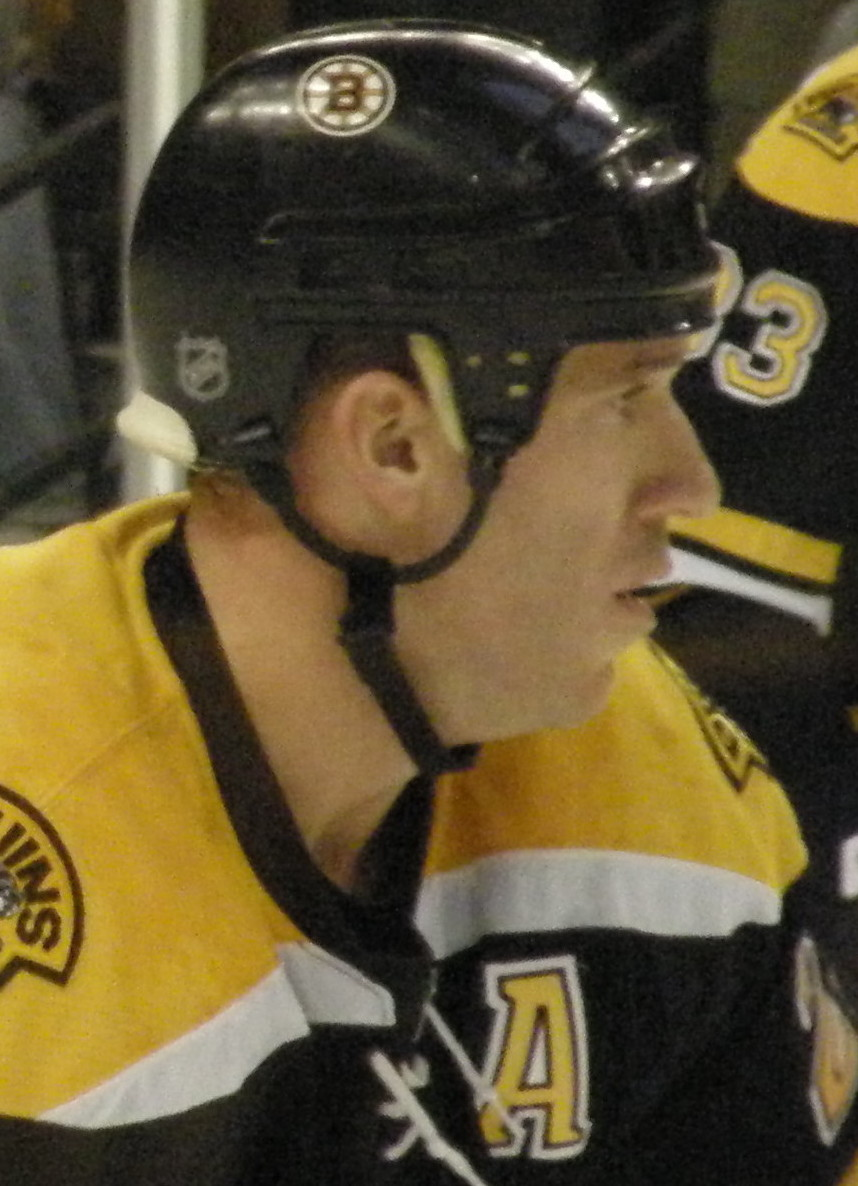
Glen Murray

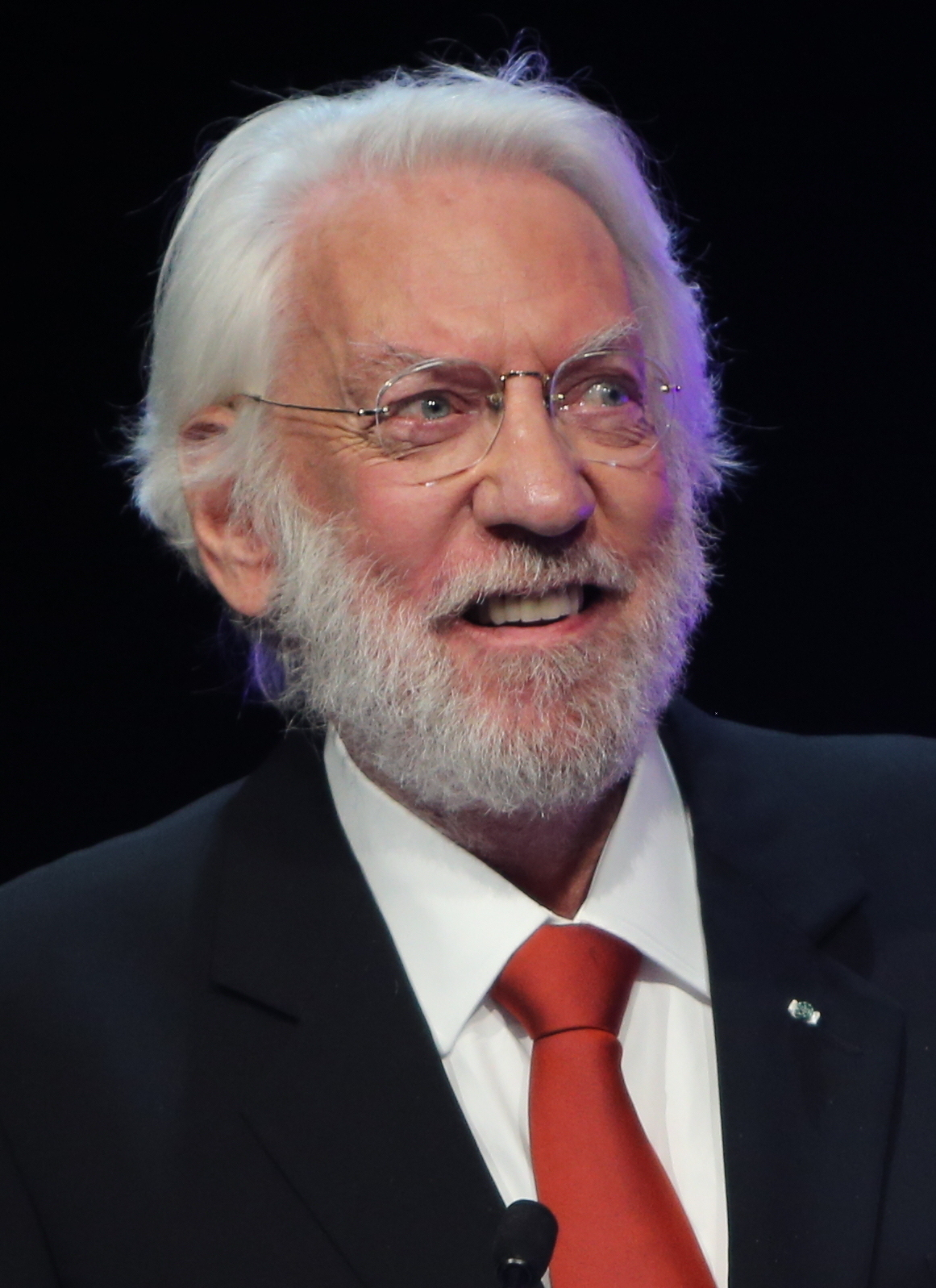
Donald Sutherland

Some notable former Bridgewater residents
- Allan Blakeney, 10th Premier of Saskatchewan, born in Bridgewater
- Stella Bowles MSM, environmental scientist and youngest recipient of the Order of Nova Scotia, appointed 2020
- Robert MacGregor Dawson – political scientist
- John Dunsworth – actor & politician
- Sheila A. Hellstrom – first woman to graduate from Canadian Forces College, and the first woman Regular Force member to achieve the rank of Brigadier-General
- Jenna Martin – Canadian Olympian
- Glen Murray – former NHL hockey player
- Donald Sutherland – actor

== See also ==
- List of municipalities in Nova Scotia
