= Black Point, Halifax =

Community in Nova Scotia, Canada

Coordinates: 44°39′5.7″N 63°58′50.7″W

Black Point in Nova Scotia

Black Point (2021 population: 486) is a rural community of the Halifax Regional Municipality in the Canadian province of Nova Scotia.

Black Point is the closest community in the Ten Beaches area to Metropolitan Halifax, just 30 minutes away, on Highway 3.

Black Point is believed to have been given its name because its land mass appear black from outside of St. Margaret's Bay. Original land grants were given in 1786, but it was not until the 19th century that the community began to take shape. Black's Point first post office opened in 1867. A new school opened in 1879. A United Baptist Church was dedicated in 1898.

Today, the fire station and community hall are focal points of the community, where community suppers and social events are held. The village also boasts some antique and craft shops, and has two sand beaches, the Black Point Beach and The Puddle Beach.

Fernwood Publishing has been headquartered in Black Point since the early 1990s.

== Demographics ==
In the 2021 Census of Population conducted by Statistics Canada, Black Point had a population of 486 living in 221 of its 281 total private dwellings, a change of 7.5% from its 2016 population of 452. With a land area of 1.48 km^{2} (0.57 sq mi), it had a population density of 328.4/km^{2} (850.5/sq mi) in 2021.
