= Ingramport, Nova Scotia =

Community in Nova Scotia, Canada

Coordinates: 44°39′42.7″N 63°58′5.7″W

Ingramport in Nova Scotia

Ingramport is a rural community of Halifax in the Canadian province of Nova Scotia.
