= Simms Settlement, Nova Scotia =

Community in Nova Scotia, Canada

Coordinates: 44°42′56.4″N 64°6′31″W

Simms Settlement in Nova Scotia

Simms Settlement is a rural community in Municipality of the District of Chester in the Canadian province of Nova Scotia.
