= Port Mouton, Nova Scotia =

Community in Nova Scotia, Canada

Coordinates: 43°55′38″N 64°50′55″W

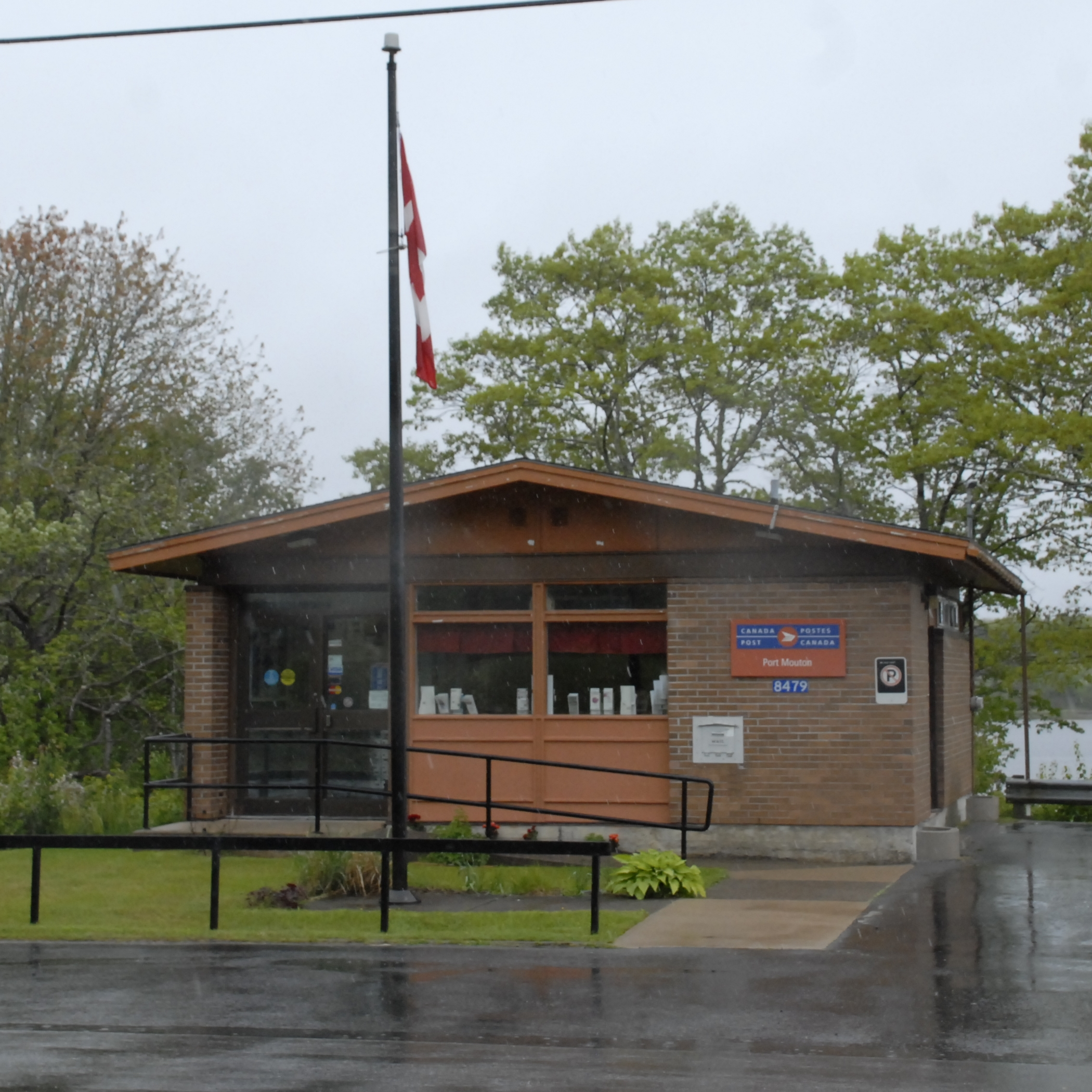
Port Mouton post office

Port Mouton is a small community along Highway 103 on the southwest coast of Region of Queens Nova Scotia, Canada. It is about ten miles from Liverpool, the nearest significant community, and 160 kilometres from Halifax. The local residents pronounce the community's name 'Port Mah-TOON'.

== History ==
On May 13, 1604, the French explorers Pierre Dugua, Sieur de Monts and Samuel de Champlain landed at Port Mouton and built a temporary camp at Bull Point. The village takes its name because a sheep, excited to see land after a long journey, jumped overboard one of the vessels and swam to shore.

Port Mouton in Nova Scotia

The most significant attraction near Port Mouton is the Seaside Adjunct to Kejimkujik National Park, part of which is accessible via a trail originating at Southwest Port Mouton, a fishing hamlet located on a local road which forks from the 103 Highway in Port Mouton. A study of the rocks (including a detailed map of the rocky landscape in the Seaside Adjunct) was made by a geology student from Dalhousie University's earth science department in 1988. Businesses include a restaurant, general store, liquor store, year-round traveler's hostel, and one or two seasonal craft shops. Fishing is the main employer for those residents who work in the town, with most employed on boats. The fish plant, which used to be the largest employer in Port Mouton, closed down. There is a United Church of Canada and a Canada Post office located on the main highway. The K-8 school closed in 1994 and children must now travel to Liverpool to attend school. The oldest house in Port Mouton is the Campbell House, which is now a local restaurant named Seascape.

== Points of interest ==
- Kejimkujik National Park
- Summerville Beach Provincial Park
