= Upper Tantallon, Nova Scotia =

Upper Tantallon
- Location within Nova Scotia
- Coordinates: 44°42′04″N 63°51′32″W
- Country: Canada
- Province: Nova Scotia
- Municipality: Halifax Regional Municipality
- Community council: Western Region Community Council
- Planning Area: St. Margarets Bay
- Postal code: B3Z
- Area Code: 902

Upper Tantallon (pronounced 'tan-TAL-en') is a suburban community that extends from the Hammonds Plains Road (Route 213) to the crossroads of Trunk 3 and Route 333 within the Halifax Regional Municipality of Nova Scotia Canada, 28.5 km (17.7 mi) west from Downtown Halifax, Nova Scotia, Canada. The community is likely named for Tantallon Castle in Scotland.

== Communications ==
- The first three characters of the postal code are B3Z
- The Telephone exchange is 902 826,820
- Cable Internet access – Eastlink, DSL – Aliant

== Statistics ==
- Total Population 3378
- Total Dwellings 1528
- Total Land Area – 97.5023 km^{2}
