= Aspotogan Peninsula =

Peninsula in Nova Scotia

Coordinates: 44°32′22.1″N 64°5′17.5″W

Aspotogan Peninsula in Nova Scotia

The Aspotogan Peninsula (/ˌæspəˈtoʊɡən/) is a peninsula in the eastern part of Lunenburg County, Nova Scotia, separating St. Margarets Bay in the east from Mahone Bay in the west. The peninsula was originally settled by second generation French immigrants on the east (St. Margarets Bay) side and by second generation German immigrants on the west (Mahone Bay) side. Traditionally fishing was a major industry for communities throughout the peninsula, however other primary industries such as farming and forestry were historically important as well. Shipping and shipbuilding were secondary and tertiary industries that also came into prominence during the 19th and early 20th centuries.

== Communities ==
The coast of the Aspotogan Peninsula is dotted with a number of small fishing and tourist-related communities; Hubbards in the northeast being the largest. Other communities going from Hubbards clockwise around the peninsula include Fox Point, Mill Cove, Birchy Head, The Lodge, Northwest Cove, Southwest Cove, Aspotogan, Bayswater, New Harbour, Blandford, Upper Blandford, Deep Cove, and East River.

Route 329 circles the peninsula along the coast while Trunk 3 and Highway 103 pass to the north.

== History: Eighteenth century ==
The name Aspotogan derives from the Mi'kmaq language. The word is a corruption of Ashmutogun or Ukpudeskakun meaning "block the passageway or where the seals go in and out". Because the high land of the Aspotogan is the highest on the south shore, the land was used as a marker for sailors coming from Europe and the West Indies on their way to Hallfax. Along with the Mi'kmaq, there were primarily three strains of immigrants who settled the Aspotogan Peninsula: first the Newfoundland Irish (1750s), then the New England Planters arrived from Chester, Nova Scotia (1760s) and, finally, second generation Foreign Protestants arrived from French Village, Nova Scotia and Lunenburg, Nova Scotia (1780s). The community of Blandford, Nova Scotia was the first community on the Aspotogan to be settled. The first recorded school house was built in Mill Cove, Nova Scotia (before 1833).

=== Mi'kmaq ===
The Aspotogan was first settled by Mi'kmaq who were a nomadic people. Mi'kmaq sites have been found in Fox Point, Northwest Cove, the village of Aspotogan and East River. They would settle along the Atlantic coast in the summer and move inland to the lakes in the winter. They lived on the Aspotogan until the beginning of World War II (1939).

=== Newfoundland Irish ===
The Acadians never lived on the Aspotogan Peninsula; however, their presence in Nova Scotia significantly influenced immigration to the colony. Even forty years after the British conquest of Nova Scotia (1710), the population of Nova Scotia was still dominated by Catholic Acadians (population 10,000). To offset the Catholic population, with the founding of Halifax (1749), the British created an immigration policy to attract Protestants to the colony.

Apart from the Foreign Protestants, the first immigrants to settle the Aspotogan Peninsula may have been Newfoundland Irish, who were Catholics. By 1750, there were 3500 Newfoundland Irish in Nova Scotia. By 1767, there were 22 Newfoundland Irish Catholics living on the Peninsula. Those who settled in the Aspotogan Peninsula seemed to have left the area after a short time. There are only three family names that remain: Murphy, Keating and Carroll. The only other evidence of these early immigrants that remains are landmarks named after them such as Riley Point and Riley's Lake in New Harbour, Nova Scotia and Hollahan Lake in Deep Cove, Nova Scotia. These Newfoundland Irish are sometimes referred to "three boaters", moving from Ireland to Newfoundland, then to Nova Scotia, before finally settling in Boston.

=== New England Planters ===
Prior to 1767, the Protestants who settled the Aspotogan Peninsula were the New England Planters, primarily from Massachusetts. For these Protestants from New England, the Governor of Nova Scotia established Chester (1759). Some of these New England Planters eventually crossed Mahone Bay to settle on the Aspotogan Peninsula. Nova Scotia Lt. Governor Michael Franklin reported that by January 1, 1767, there were eleven Americans already living on the Peninsula.

According to Nova Scotia Lt. Governor Franklin's return, by 1767 there were also 62 English living on the Aspotogan. The identities and location of the English who migrated to the Peninsula are unknown. They may have been associated with English names such as Hubbards and Blandford. It is unknown if after the American Revolution (1783), Loyalists from America settled on the Peninsula.

=== Foreign Protestants ===
After 1767, a significant strain of immigrants to settle the Aspotogan Peninsula was Foreign Protestants, both German and French speaking. Upon the founding of Halifax in 1749, Nova Scotia was a British Protestant colony with only Catholic Acadian settlers. In an attempt to assimilate the Catholic Acadians, the British invited Protestants from across Europe to settle in Nova Scotia. Between 1750 and 1753, over 2500 "Foreign Protestants" had arrived in Halifax. After living in Halifax for three years, Lunenburg was established for these "Foreign Protestants" (1753).

During the American Revolution (1776–83), the Americans plundered Lunenburg, burning buildings and taking prisoners (1782). After the Raid on Lunenburg, many German speaking and French speaking residents left Lunenburg. Some German-speaking residents went to nearby Rose Bay, while French-speaking residents established French Village, Nova Scotia in St. Margaret's Bay (1783). The west side of the Aspotogan Peninsula was first settled primarily by Germans from Rose Bay, while the east side of the Aspotogan was settled by the French, crossing St. Margaret's bay from French Village. Part of the German tradition that remained on the Peninsula until the end of the 20thcentury was the export of sauerkraut. Zinck p. 43-48

== Notable residents ==
One of the most famous people to make Deep Cove their home was Cyrus Eaton, a millionaire industrialist. He invited guests to stay at his home such as the first astronaut in space, Yuri Gagarin.

== Tourism ==
During the 1800s tourism increased and Hubbards became a regular stopping place for the stagecoach. The Halifax and Southwestern Railway between Halifax and Yarmouth, completed in 1905, carried both passengers and freight and crossed the base of the peninsula. This provided easy rail access for visitors to the scenic splendor and beaches of the area and made the Aspotogan Peninsula a popular tourist destination. Many hotels and cottages were established during this period, including The Gainsborough.

In 1969, Highway 103 was completed linking Hubbards to Halifax with a 2-lane controlled-access highway. With a driving time of only 45 minutes, more residents began to commute to Halifax for work. Reasonable land prices and the opportunity to live in a rural setting also encouraged many city dwellers to move to the area.

Tourism continues to be an important contributor to the local economy, drawing people from all over the world. Local bed and breakfast operators and inns, restaurants, and campgrounds are busy during the summer months. The Shore Club, which recently celebrated its 50th anniversary, remains one of the last great dance halls in the area and is well known for its Saturday night dances and lobster suppers.

The 131-room Aspotogan Sea Spa was conceived as a luxury getaway for European tourists. Construction was halted in the mid-1990s when the developers ran out of money. The five-storey hotel, substantially complete, sat abandoned for two decades before being demolished in 2016.

== Military ==
Regiments were raised on the Aspotogan to defend against possible Fenian Raids, such as the regiment at Blandford, Nova Scotia.

During World War I, the military built a forty-foot look off at the peak of the Aspotogan mountain.

The Gainsborough hotel was sold to the federal government in 1944 and was used as part of the St. Margaret's Bay Training School for the Canadian Merchant Navy. (In 1969, the J.D. Shatford Library was built on the site.)

In 1967, Canadian Forces Station Mill Cove (CFS Mill Cove) was opened to provide a naval radio communications receiving station for Maritime Forces Atlantic. The radio station consisted of approximately 4,000 acres (16 km^{2}) of land, private married quarters, and administration buildings. The complex was a major employer and contributor to the local economy until it was automated in the late 1990s.

== Film, television and literature ==
In 1994, the Aspotogan Heritage Trust was created to oversee the renovation and re-population of the land and buildings that were decommissioned at CFS Mill Cove following the automation of the receiver station. The Trust markets these assets as Mill Cove Park and includes the province's first dedicated sound stage (established in 1996) in the former administration and gymnasium buildings. More than $40 million of film and TV production took place at this sound stage over a 5-year period, including filming for the CBC Television series Black Harbour and Blackfly.

The Hollywood film High Tide at Noon (1957) was filmed at Northwest Cove, Nova Scotia while The Shipping News with Kevin Spacey was filmed in Blandford, Nova Scotia.

Author Frank Parker Day lived on East Ironbound, an island which is just off the shore of Blandford, Nova Scotia. He based his bestselling novel Rockbound on his experience on the island.

Kirsten Dunst and Lynn Redgrave filmed Deeply on East Ironbound.
