= Bayswater, Nova Scotia =

Community in Nova Scotia, Canada

Bayswater
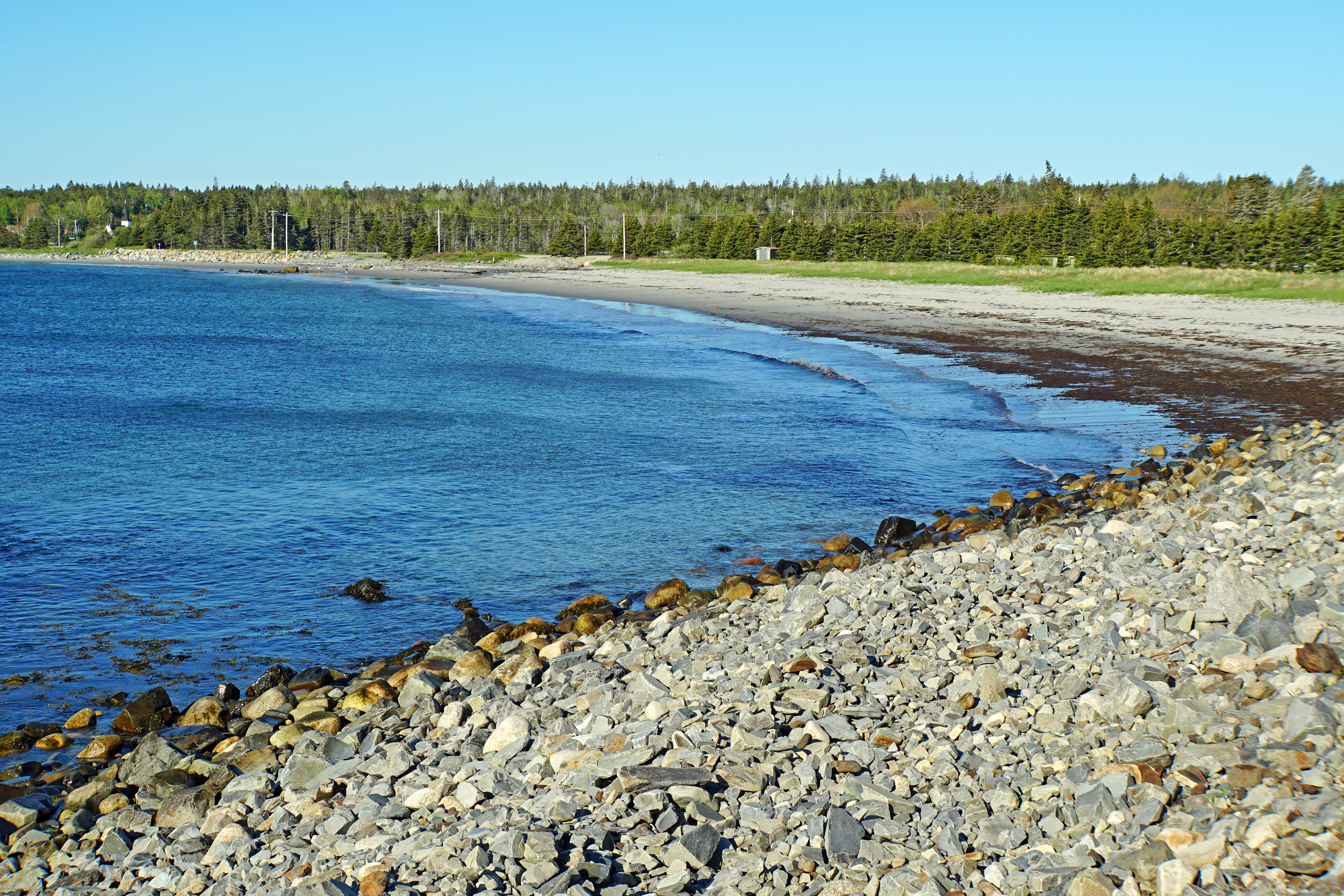

- Location in Nova Scotia
- Coordinates: 44°30′6.2″N 64°4′1.5″W
- Country: Canada
- Province: Nova Scotia
- County: Lunenburg
- Municipal district: Chester

Bayswater is a community in the Canadian province of Nova Scotia, located in the Chester Municipal District on the Aspotogan Peninsula in Lunenburg County on the Lighthouse Route (Nova Scotia Route 329). The community is home to Bayswater Beach Provincial Park, Swissair 111 Memorial, and All Saints Anglican Church.

== History ==
German settlers who first settled were Richard and Knickle who came from Lunenburg. Settled prior to 1767.

An early immigrant to Bayswater was James Boutilier from Montbéliard, eastern France. He had nine children; the first was born in Bayswater in 1862.

The village is probably named after Bayswater in England, an area of west London in the City of Westminster. It is a residential district located three miles (4.8 km) west-northwest of Charing Cross and borders the north side of Hyde Park and Kensington Gardens.

Bayswater was initially named Sandy Beaches.

== Swissair 111 ==
A Swissair Flight 111 memorial site is located in Bayswater. Bayswater is the site of the recovery operation for Swissair Flight 111. There is another memorial near the community of Peggy's Cove. The bodies of the unidentified passengers and crew are interred at this site.

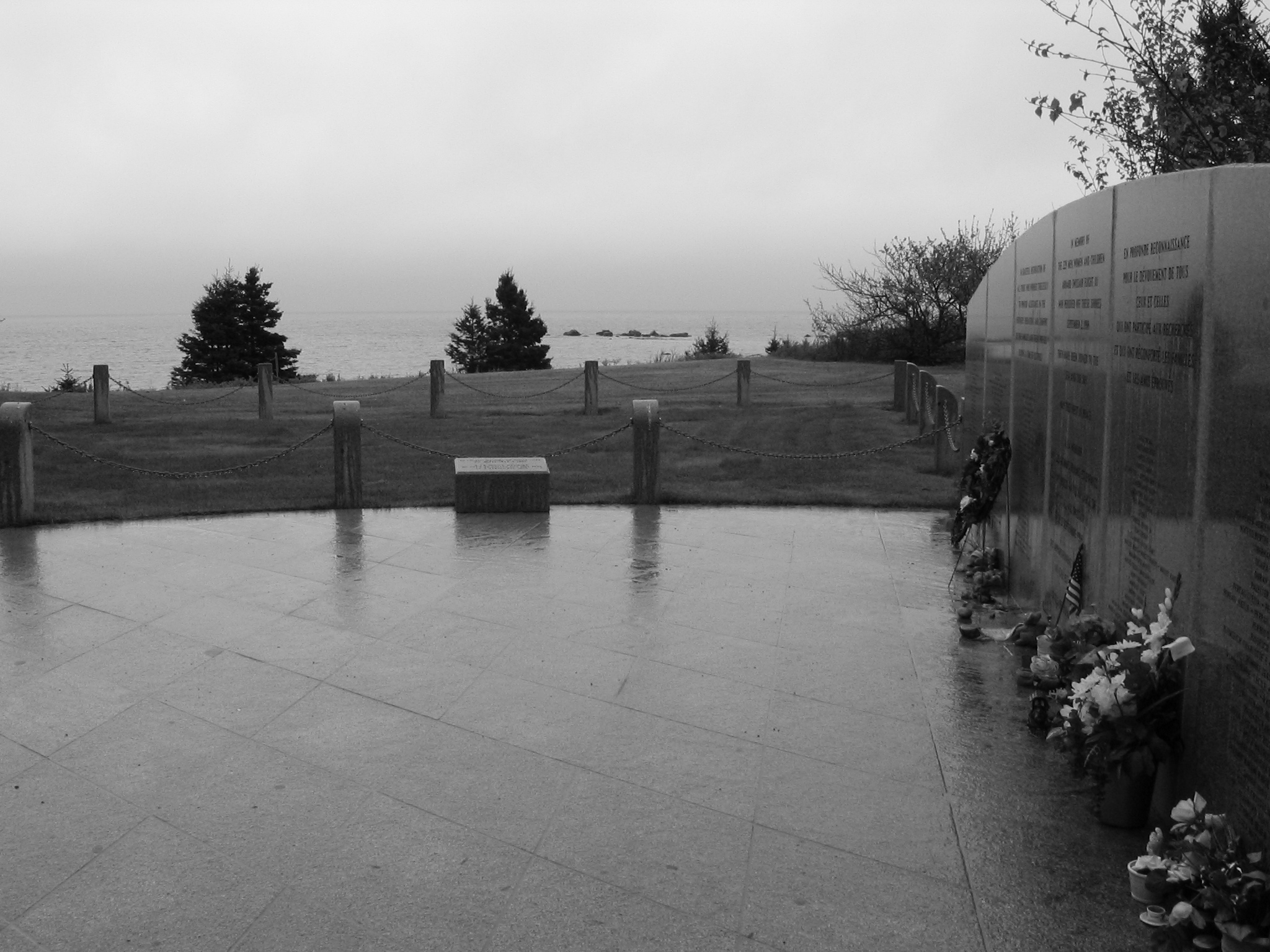
Bayswater, Nova Scotia memorial.

== Parks ==
- Bayswater Beach Provincial Park
- Swissair 111 Memorial

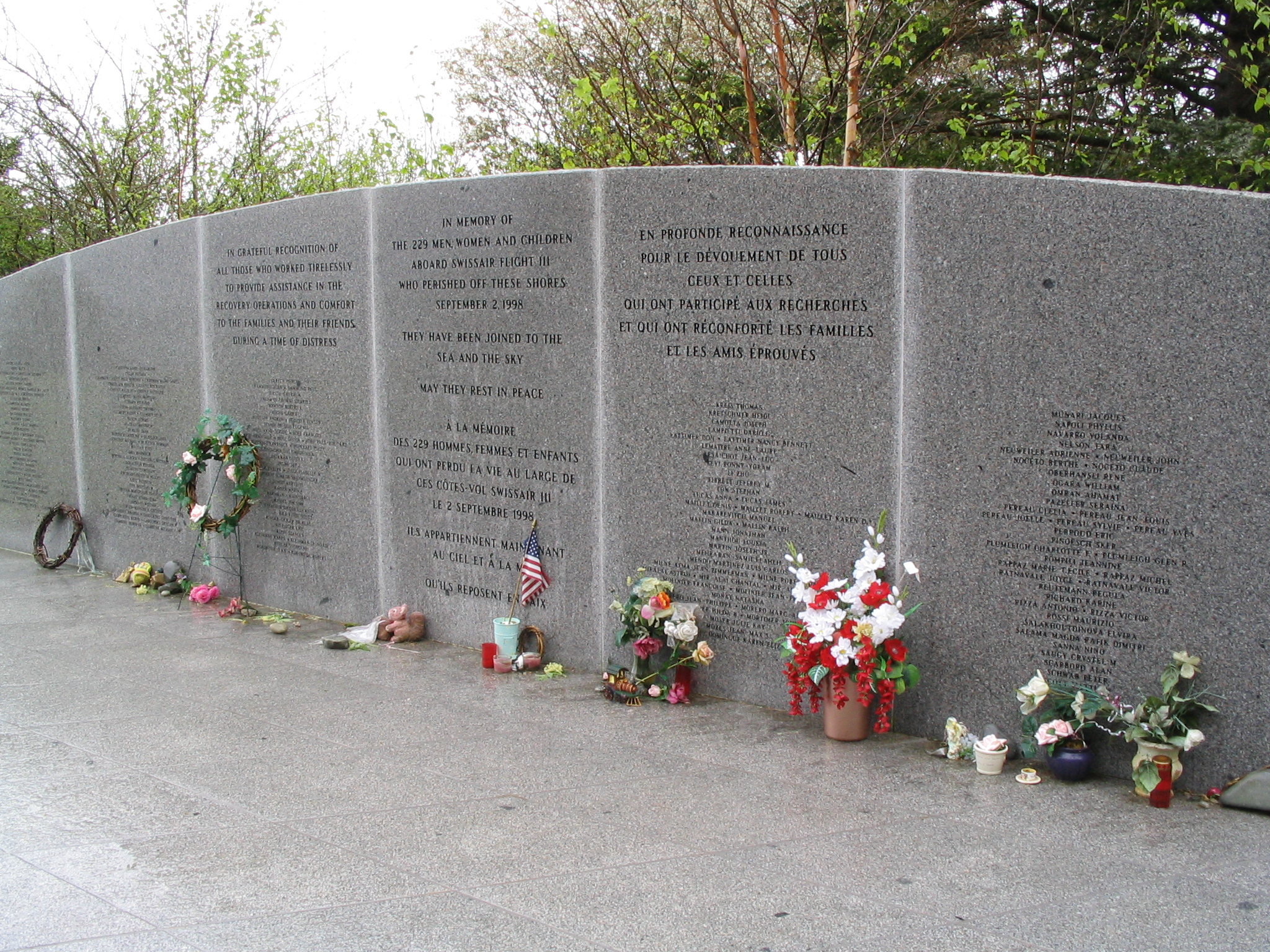
Flowers at the Bayswater memorial

== Nearby Islands ==
- Saddle island
- Gravel Island
- Big Tancook Island
- Little Tancook Island

== Nearby communities ==
- Blandford
- Chester
- Aspotogan
- Fox Point
- Deep Cove
