= New Harbour =

New Harbour or New Harbor can mean:

In Antarctica

- New Harbour (Antarctica) (sometimes spelt New Harbor)
- New Harbour Heights, former name of Mount Barnes in the Kukri Hills, Antarctica

In Australia

- New Harbour, Tasmania

In Canada

- New Harbour, Newfoundland and Labrador
  - New Harbour Island, Newfoundland and Labrador
- New Harbour, Nova Scotia
- New Harbour (Chester), Nova Scotia

In Gibraltar

- New Harbours, an industrial complex in Gibraltar

In Singapore

- New Harbour, former name of Keppel Harbour, Singapore

In the United States

- New Harbor, Maine
- New Harbour Mall, Fall River, Massachusetts

== See also ==
- Nyhavn, "New Harbour" in Danish
