= Nova Scotia Route 329 =

Highway in Nova Scotia, Canada

Route 329

Route information
- Maintained by Nova Scotia Department of Transportation and Infrastructure Renewal
- Length: 42 km (26 mi)

Major junctions
- West end: Trunk 3 in East River
- East end: Trunk 3 in Hubbards

Location
- Country: Canada
- Province: Nova Scotia
- Counties: Lunenburg

Highway system
- Provincial highways in Nova Scotia; 100-series
← Route 328	→ Route 330

Route 329 is a collector road in the Canadian province of Nova Scotia.

It is located in Lunenburg County and connects East River at Trunk 3 with Hubbards at Trunk 3.

It runs around the perimeter of the Aspotogan Peninsula.

== Communities ==
- East River
  - East River Point
- Deep Cove
- Upper Blandford
- Blandford
- Bayswater
- Aspotogan
- Northwest Cove
- The Lodge
- Birchy Head
- Fox Point
- Hubbards

== Parks ==
- Swissair 111 Memorial
- Bayswater Beach Provincial Park
- East River Provincial Park

== See also ==
- List of Nova Scotia provincial highways
