= Deep Cove =

Deep Cove may refer to:

== Places ==
In Canada

- Deep Cove, British Columbia
- Deep Cove, Newfoundland and Labrador
- Deep Cove, Nova Scotia

In New Zealand

- Deep Cove, New Zealand

In the United States

- Deep Cove, Maine

== Other ==
- Deep Cove (album), a 2004 album by Renee Rosnes
- Deep Cove (film), a 2009 horror film formerly known as Fear Island
- Deep Cove Stories, a collection of short stories by Bill Gaston
