= Swissair Flight 111 =

1998 aircraft accident in Canada

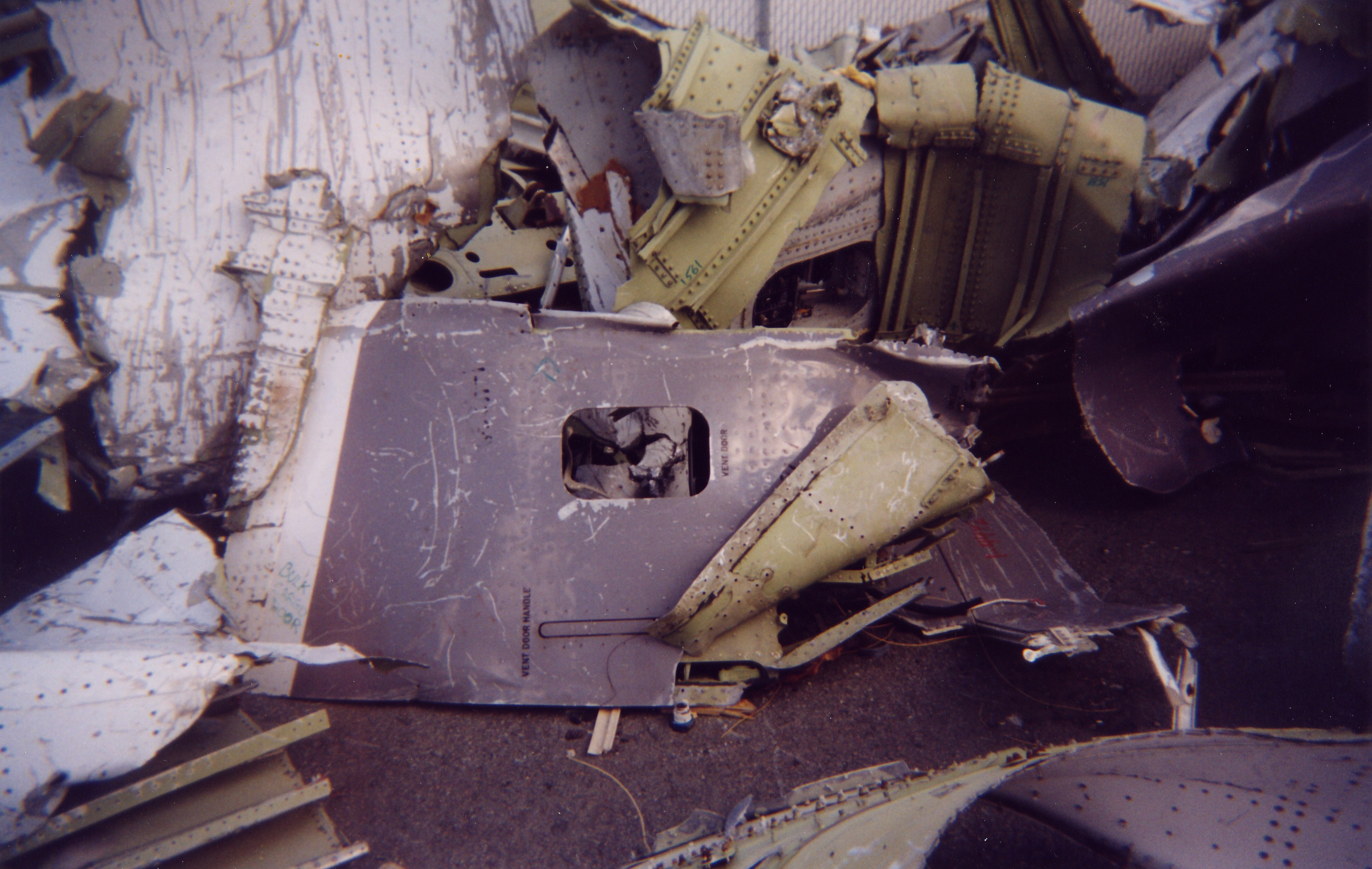
- Cargo door and other recovered debris

Accident
- Date: 2 September 1998
- Summary: In-flight fire leading to loss of control
- Site: Atlantic Ocean, 9 km (5.6 miles) southwest off Peggys Cove, Nova Scotia, Canada; 44°24′33″N 63°58′25″W

Aircraft
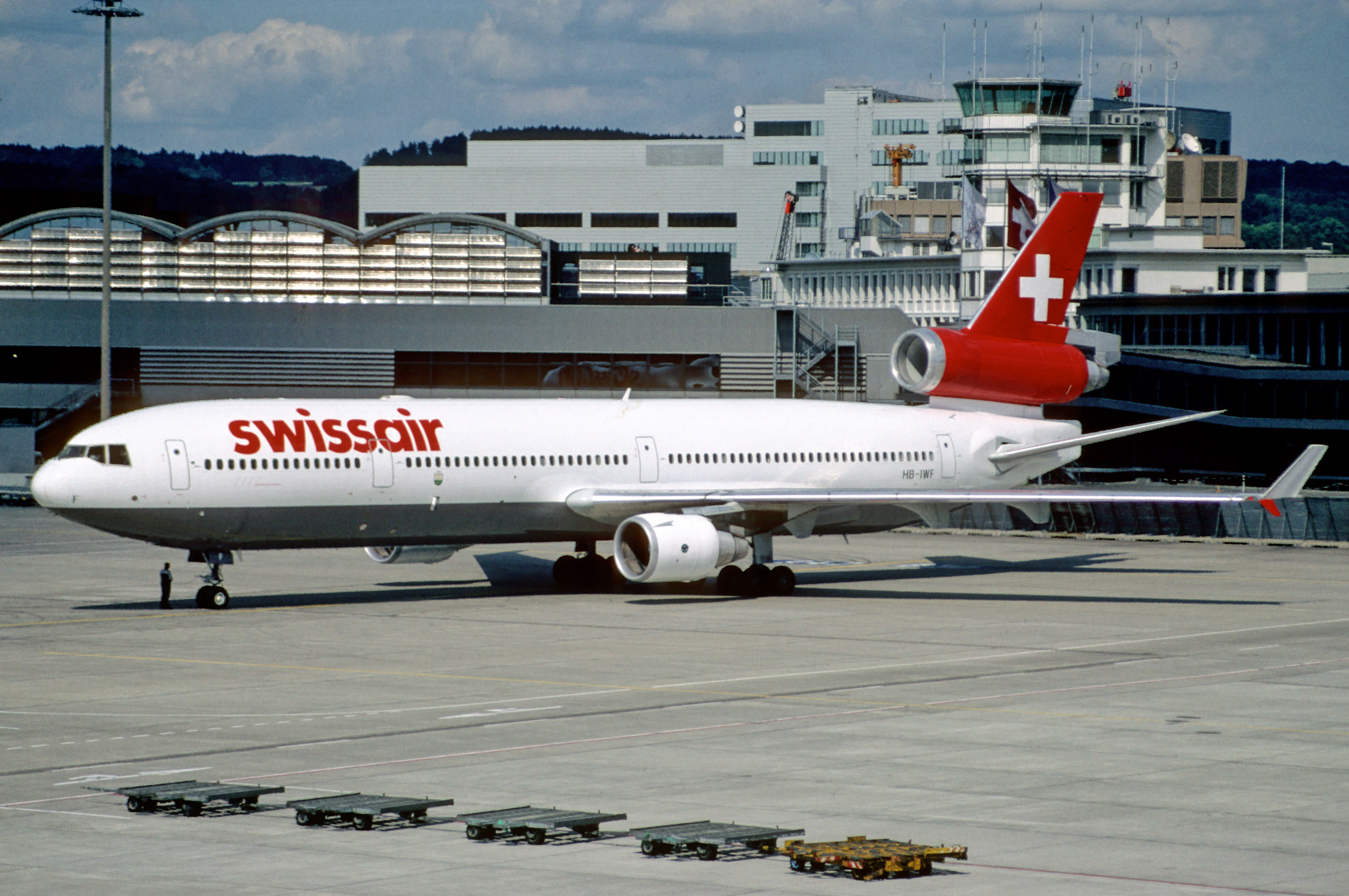
- HB-IWF, the aircraft involved in the accident, seen in July 1998
- Aircraft type: McDonnell Douglas MD-11
- Aircraft name: Vaud
- Operator: Swissair
- IATA flight No.: SR111
- ICAO flight No.: SWR111
- Call sign: SWISSAIR 111
- Registration: HB-IWF
- Flight origin: John F. Kennedy International Airport; New York City, United States
- Destination: Geneva Airport; Geneva, Switzerland
- Occupants: 229
- Passengers: 215
- Crew: 14
- Fatalities: 229
- Survivors: 0

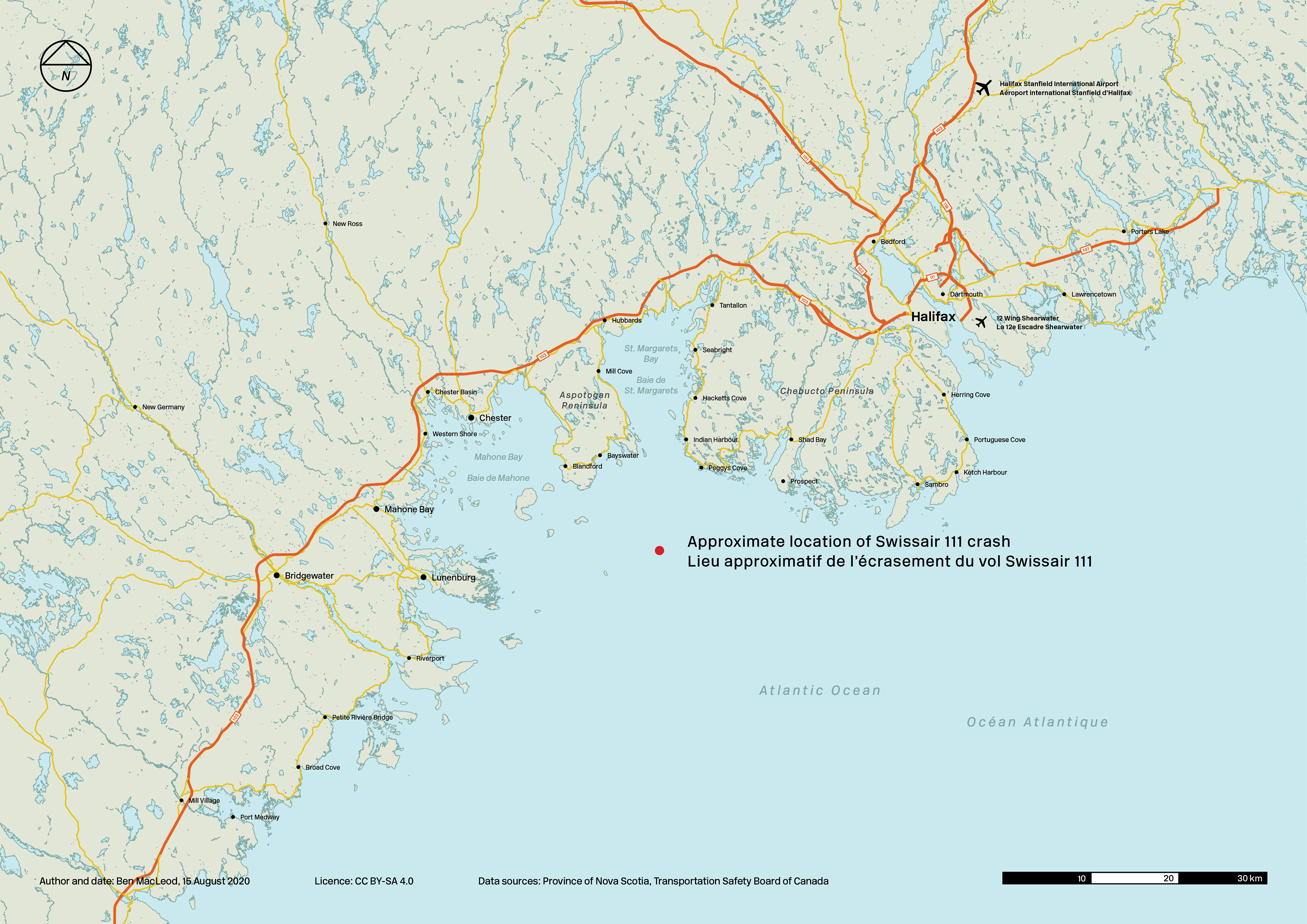
Approximate location of the crash

Swissair Flight 111 was a scheduled international passenger flight from John F. Kennedy International Airport in New York City, United States, to Cointrin Airport in Geneva, Switzerland. The flight was also a codeshare flight with Delta Air Lines. On 2 September 1998, the McDonnell Douglas MD-11 operating this flight crashed into the Atlantic Ocean southwest of Halifax Stanfield International Airport at the entrance to St. Margarets Bay, Nova Scotia, Canada, killing all 215 passengers and 14 crew members on board. The crash site was 8 kilometres (5 mi; 4 nmi) from shore, roughly equidistant from the small fishing and tourist communities of Peggys Cove and Bayswater. It is the deadliest accident in Swissair history, the deadliest involving the MD-11, and the second-deadliest aviation accident in Canada, behind Arrow Air Flight 1285R.

The search and rescue response, crash recovery operation, and investigation by the Government of Canada took more than four years and cost CA$57 million. The investigation carried out by the Transportation Safety Board of Canada (TSB) concluded that flammable material used in the aircraft's structure allowed a fire to spread beyond the control of the flight crew, resulting in the crash of the aircraft. Several wide-ranging recommendations were made, which were incorporated into newer US Federal Aviation Administration (FAA) standards.

== Background ==
=== Aircraft ===
The aircraft involved was a seven-year-old McDonnell Douglas MD-11 and registered as HB-IWF. The aircraft was powered by three Pratt & Whitney PW4462 turbofan engines, and the aircraft had logged 36,041 airframe hours before the accident. It bore the name of Schaffhausen until 1993, when it was renamed to Vaud. The cabin was configured with 241 passenger seats. First- and business-class seats were equipped with in-seat in-flight entertainment (IFE) systems from Interactive Flight Technologies.

The in-flight entertainment system was the first of its kind equipped on the aircraft. It allowed the first- and business-class passengers to select their own movies and games and to gamble. The system was installed in business class one year before the incident, between 21 August and 9 September 1997. It was installed in first class five months later, in February 1998, due to logistical delays.

=== Crew ===
In command was 49-year-old Captain Urs Zimmermann. At the time of the accident, he had logged approximately 10,800 hours of total flying time, of which 900 hours were logged in the MD-11. He was also an instructor pilot for the MD-11. Before his career with Swissair, he was a fighter pilot in the Swiss Air Force from 1967 to 1970. Zimmermann was described as a friendly person with professional skills, who always worked with exactness and precision. Zimmermann was due to turn 50 the day after the accident.

The first officer, 36-year-old Stefan Löw, had logged approximately 4,800 hours of total flying time, including 230 hours on the MD-11. He was an instructor on the McDonnell Douglas MD-80 and the Airbus A320. From 1982 to 1990, Löw had been a pilot in the Swiss Air Force. The cabin crew comprised a maître de cabine (purser) and eleven flight attendants. All crew members on board Flight 111 were qualified, certified, and trained in accordance with Swiss regulations under the Joint Aviation Authorities (JAA).

== Accident ==
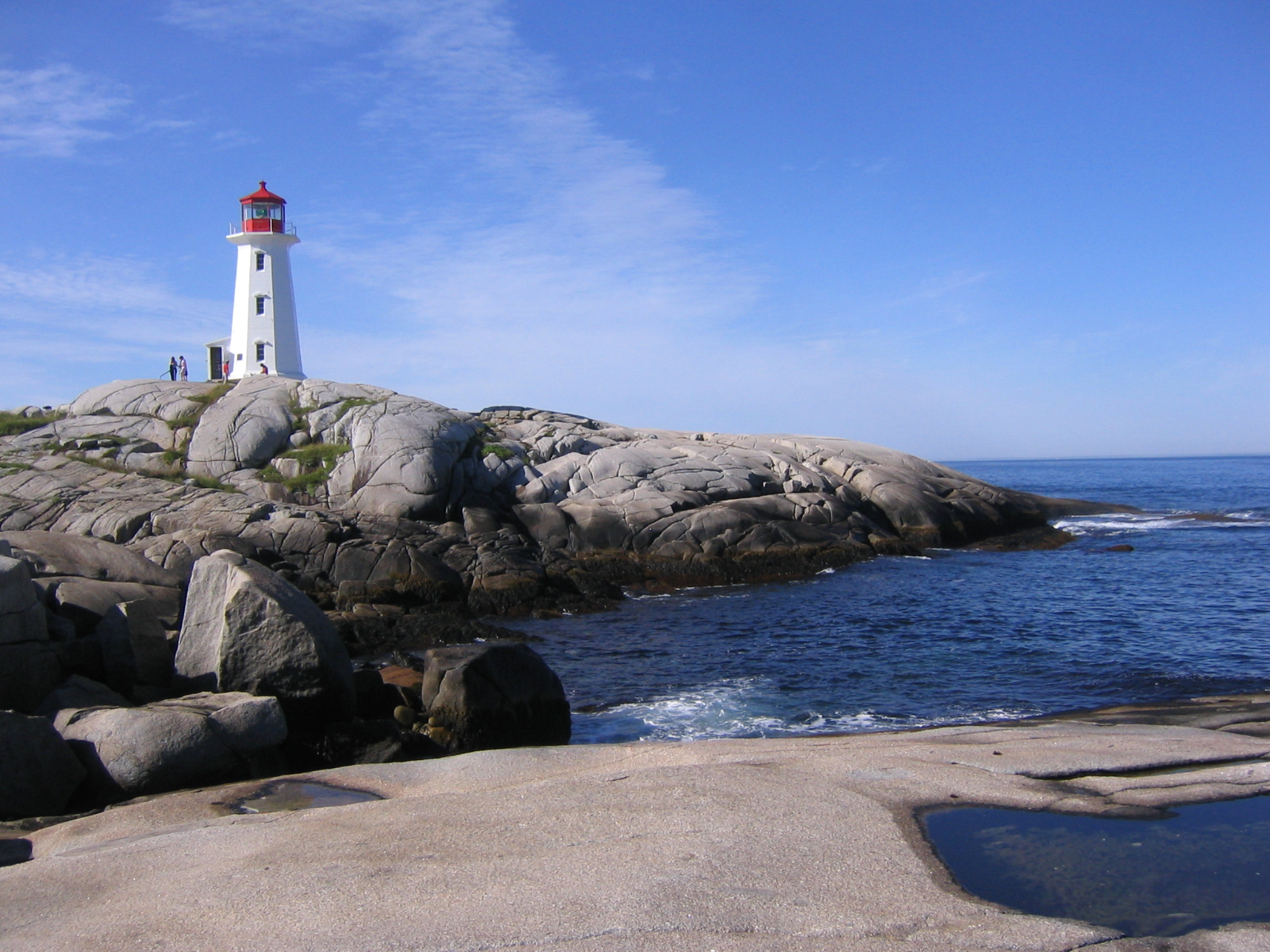
Swissair Flight 111 crashed 8 km (5 mi) off the coast of Peggys Cove. Pictured is the community's iconic Peggys Point Lighthouse in 2005, with St. Margarets Bay seen below the lighthouse on the right.

=== Departure ===
Flight 111 took off from New York City's John F. Kennedy International Airport at 20:18 EDT (00:18 UTC) on 2 September 1998. From 20:33 to 20:47 EDT (00:33 to 00:47 UTC), the aircraft experienced a radio blackout for approximately thirteen minutes, which was later found to be caused by communication radio tuning errors.

=== Flight ===
At 22:10 ADT (01:10 UTC, 52 minutes after takeoff), while flying over Yarmouth, Nova Scotia entering Canadian airspace after exiting from Boston Center, the flight crew detected an odour in the cockpit and determined it to be smoke from the air conditioning system. Four minutes later, the odour returned and smoke became visible, prompting the pilots to make a "pan-pan" radio call to Moncton Centre, the area control center (ACC) station in charge of air traffic over Nova Scotia. The pan-pan call indicated that there was an urgency due to smoke in the cockpit but did not declare an emergency as denoted by a "mayday" call. The crew requested a diversion to Boston (234 nautical miles (433 km; 269 mi) away) before accepting Moncton ATC's offer of radar vectors to the closer Halifax International Airport in Enfield, Nova Scotia, 66 nautical miles (76 mi; 122 km) away.

At 22:18 ADT (01:18 UTC), Moncton Centre handed over the plane's traffic control to the Halifax Terminal Control Centre, which was responsible for controlling traffic in and out of Halifax International Airport. Upon being advised by Halifax ATC that they were 30 nautical miles (35 mi; 55 km) from Halifax airport, the crew requested more flight distance to allow the aircraft to descend safely from its altitude of 21,000 feet (6,400 m) at the time. The crew then requested permission to dump fuel to reduce their weight for landing. Halifax thus vectored the plane south toward St. Margarets Bay, where it was safe for the aircraft to dump fuel while remaining within 40 nautical miles (45 mi; 75 km) of the airport.

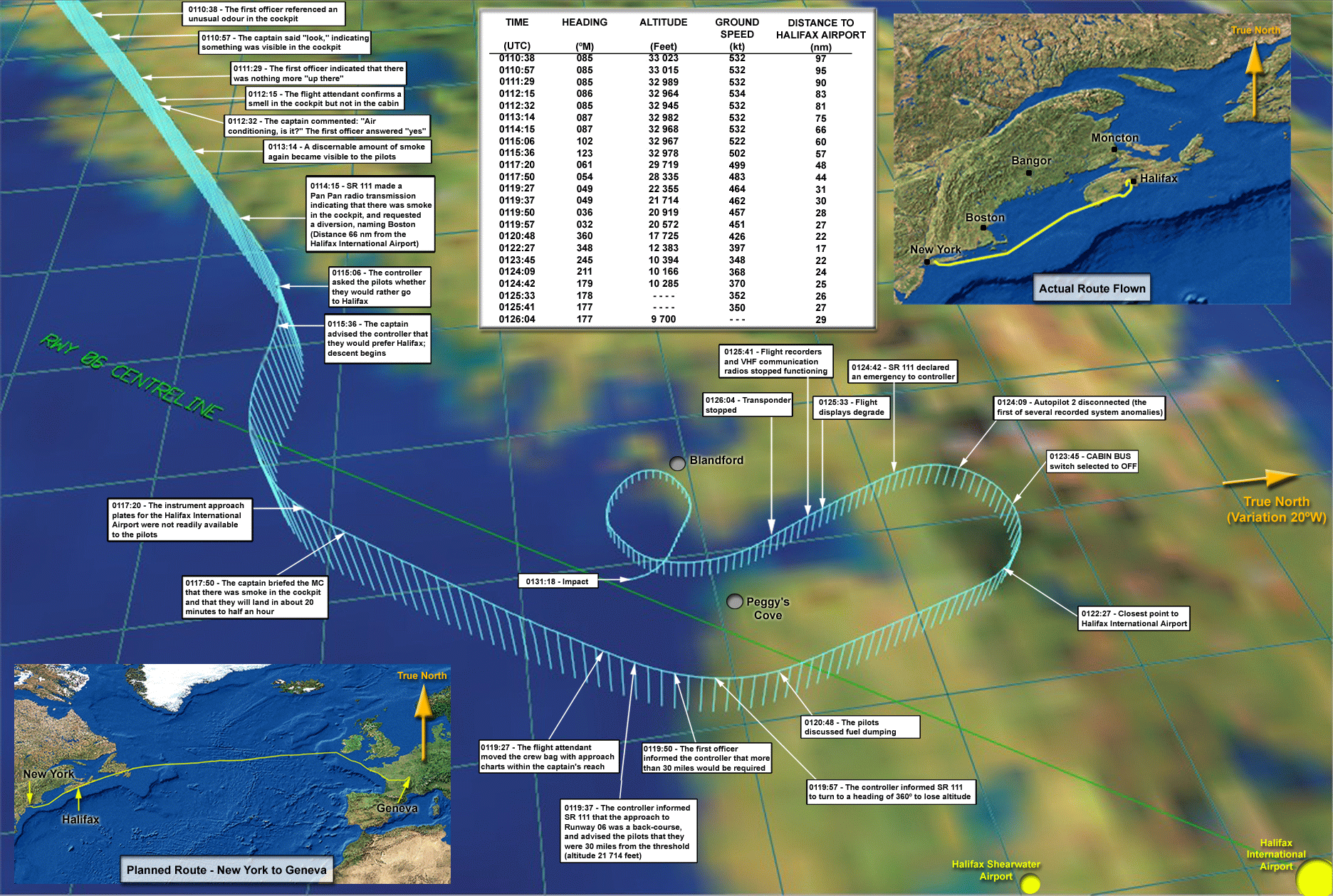
Final flight path of Swissair Flight 111

In accordance with the Swissair checklist "Smoke/fumes of unknown origin", the flight crew shut off power to the cabin using the "CABIN BUS" switch, which also turned off the recirculating fans in the cabin's ceiling. This allowed the fire to spread to the cockpit, eventually shutting off power to the aircraft's autopilot. At 22:24:28 ADT (01:24:28 UTC), the crew informed Halifax that "we now must fly manually", followed by an emergency declaration. Ten seconds later, the crew declared an emergency again, saying, "...and we are declaring [an] emergency now, Swissair one eleven," and this was the last transmission received from Flight 111.

The aircraft flight data recorder and cockpit voice recorder stopped operating at 22:25:41 ADT (01:25:41 UTC). The aircraft's transponder briefly resumed transmission of secondary radar returns from 22:25:50 to 22:26:04 ADT (01:25:50 to 01:26:04 UTC), at which time the aircraft's altitude was 9,700 feet (3,000 m). After this, the aircraft could be tracked only through primary radar, which does not provide altitude information.

=== Crash ===
Engine No. 2 (the middle engine in the MD-11's tail section) was shut down by First Officer Löw approximately one minute prior to the time of impact. The shutdown of Engine No. 2 would have had a minimal effect on aircraft controllability. In a smoke-filled cockpit and with almost no flight instruments and little to no view outside, Löw may have become spatially disoriented and, as a result, flew into the sea. Another possibility is that while attempting to see outside the cockpit windows, Löw inadvertently pushed the control column forward, thus resulting in a descent and eventual impact with the water.

At 22:31:18 ADT (01:31:18 UTC), Flight 111 struck the ocean at an estimated speed of 345 miles per hour (555 km/h; 154 m/s; 300 kn). The impact time also coincides with seismographic recorders at Halifax and Moncton, which detected a seismic event at the time. The collision with the water decelerated the aircraft with approximately 350 g, causing it to disintegrate instantly, killing everyone on board. The location of the crash was identified as approximately 44°24′33″N 63°58′25″W.

== Victims ==
Final tally of passenger nationalities (Note: Including passengers with dual citizens listed below)
Nationality	Passengers	Crew	Total
Afghanistan	1	0	1
Canada	3	0	3
Canada and Morocco	1	0	1
China	1	0	1
Egypt	1	0	1
France	41	0	41
France and United States	2	0	2
Germany	1	0	1
India	1	0	1
Iran	1	0	1
Iran and United States	1	0	1
Israel and Switzerland	1	0	1
Italy	3	0	3
Mexico	1	0	1
Russia	1	0	1
Saudi Arabia	1	0	1
Sweden	1	0	1
Switzerland	31	13	44
Switzerland and Greece	1	0	1
Switzerland and Netherlands	1	0	1
Switzerland and United Kingdom	2	0	2
Switzerland and United States	1	0	1
Spain	1	0	1
United Kingdom	3	0	3
United Kingdom and United States	2	0	2
United States	110	1	111
Yugoslavia	1	0	1
Total	215	14	229

There were 132 Americans (including one Delta Air Lines employee and one United Airlines employee), 41 Swiss (including the 13 crew members), 30 French, 4 Canadians, 3 Britons, 3 Italians, 2 Greeks, 2 Lebanese, and 1 each from Afghanistan, China, Germany, India, Iran, Russia, Saudi Arabia, Spain, St. Kitts and Nevis, Mexico, Sweden, and Yugoslavia, and 4 other passengers on board. Epidemiologists Jonathan Mann and Mary Lou Clements-Mann, a married couple who were both prominent researchers of HIV/AIDS, died in the crash.

== Post-crash response ==
=== Search and rescue operation ===
The search and rescue (SAR) operation was code-named Operation Persistence and was launched immediately by Joint Rescue Coordination Centre Halifax (JRCC Halifax). The search and rescue operation consisted of 400 Royal Canadian Air Force personnel, the Royal Canadian Navy, 700 Canadian Army personnel; the Canadian Coast Guard (CCG); Canadian Coast Guard Auxiliary (CCGA) resources; and 450 Royal Canadian Mounted Police and more than 2400 Canadian Armed Forces (CAF) personnel who were participating as part of Operation Homage. The United States Navy and the Red Cross were also involved in the operation.

Local fishermen and boaters, many of whom were CCGA volunteers, were the first rescue resources to approach the crash site, which were mostly privately owned fishing boats operating from Peggys Cove and Bayswater, as well as other harbours on St. Margaret's Bay and the Aspotogan Peninsula. The CCG Mahone Bay Inshore Rescue Boat arrived on scene at approximately 0045. They were soon joined by the CCGS Sambro.

The crash site's proximity to Halifax placed it within one hour's sailing time of ships docked at Canada's largest naval base, CFB Halifax, and one of the largest CCG bases in Canada, the CCG Regional Headquarters in Dartmouth. Calls went out immediately, and ships sailed directly to St. Margaret's Bay.

The provincial ambulance service, Emergency Health Services (EHS), received word of the crash at 22:39 AT and ordered 21 emergency units from Halifax, the South Shore, and the Annapolis Valley to respond. An EHS helicopter was also sent to the crash site, and the Queen Elizabeth II Health Sciences Centre in Halifax was put on emergency alert. The emergency health services were stood down around 3:30 the next morning, as expectations of finding survivors diminished.

The land search, including shoreline searching, was the responsibility of Halifax Regional Search and Rescue. The organization was responsible for all ground operations, including military operations and other ground search and rescue teams.

=== Search and recovery operation ===
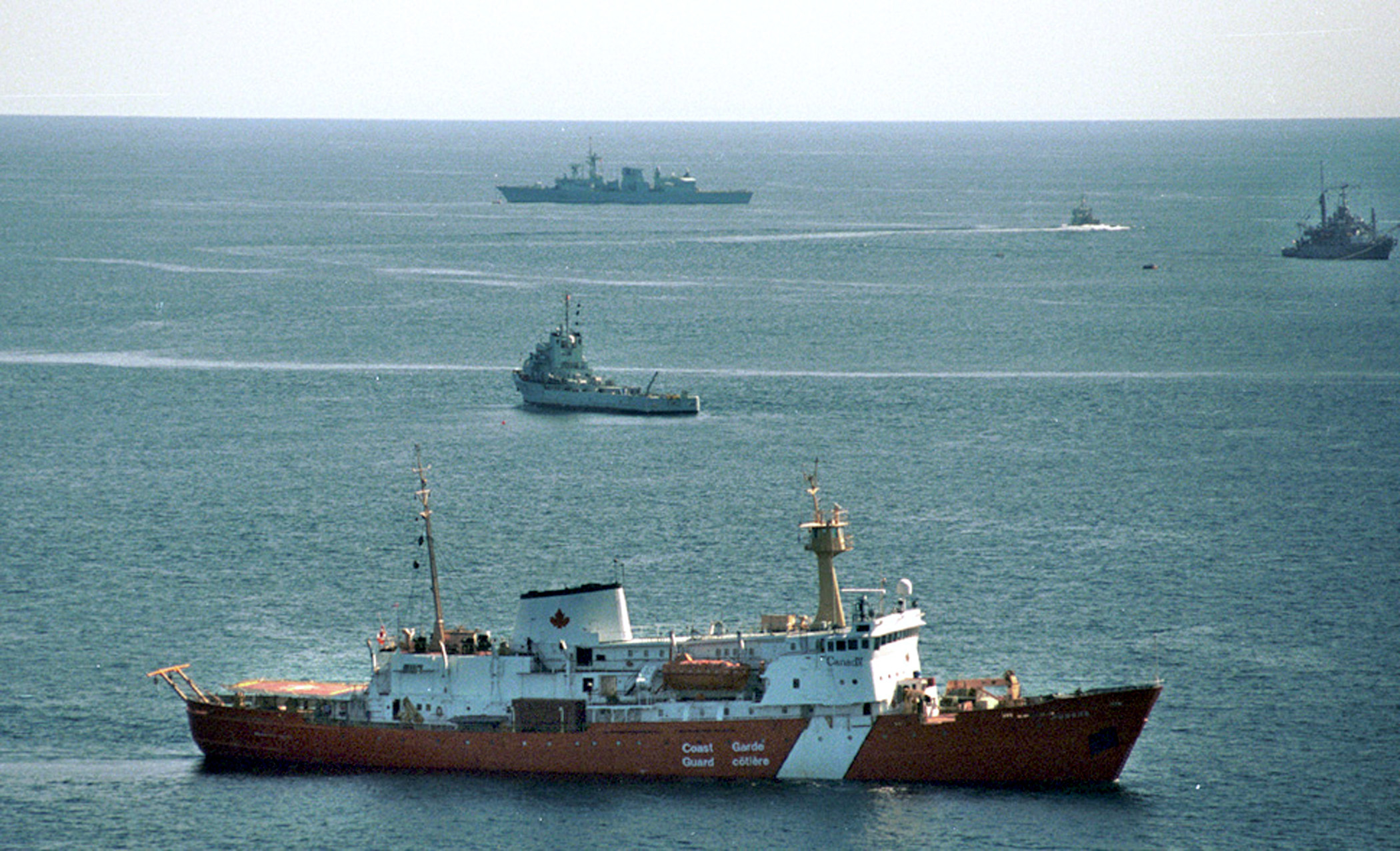
CCGS Hudson searches for Swissair Flight 111 debris on 14 September, with HMCS Anticosti (centre), USS Grapple (right), and a Halifax-class frigate (rear).

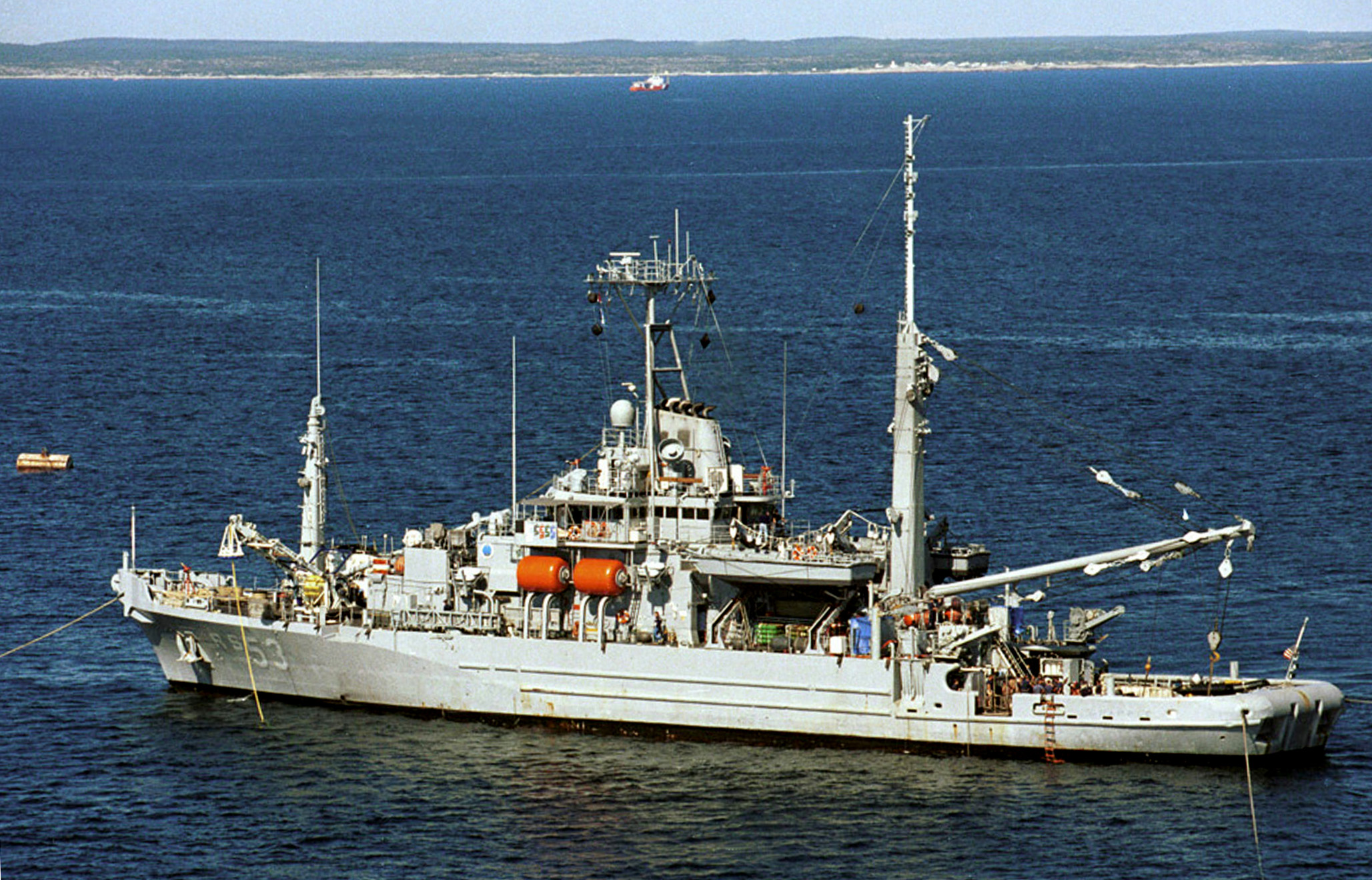
USS Grapple assisted in the underwater search phase of the Swissair Flight 111 crash near Halifax, Nova Scotia.

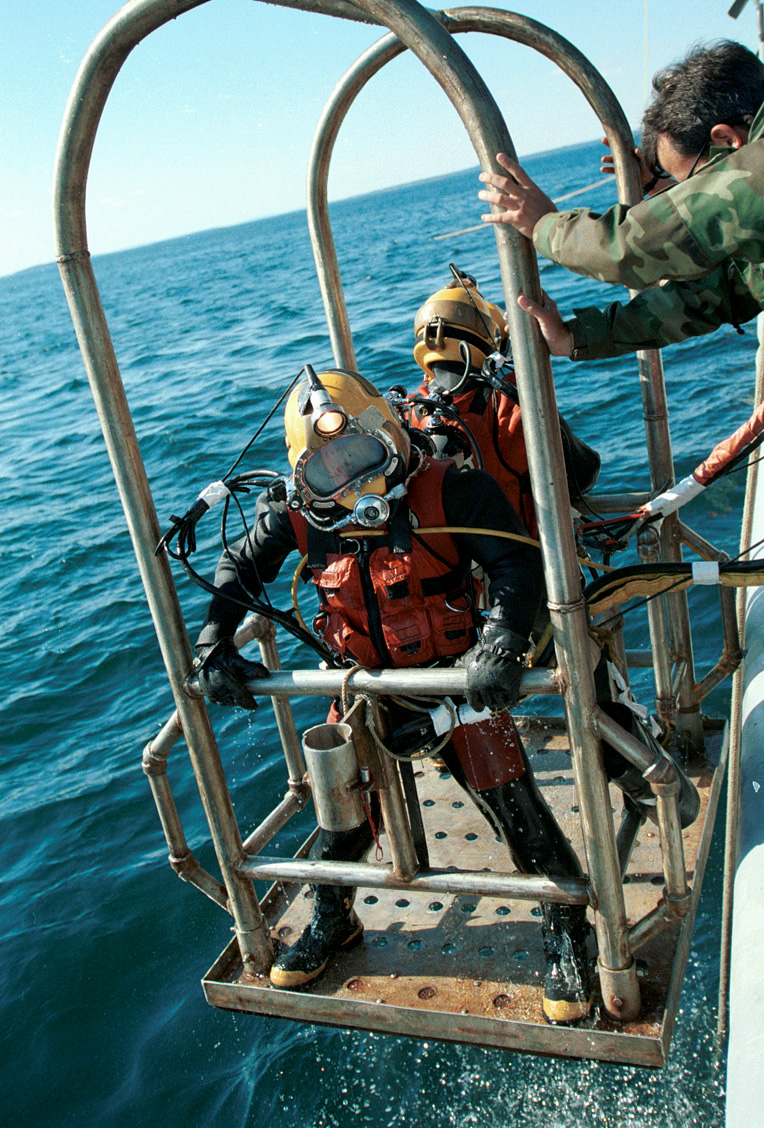
After completing 40 minutes of recovery work on the ocean floor, U.S. Navy divers from Mobile Diving Salvage Unit Two are raised to the deck of USS Grapple.

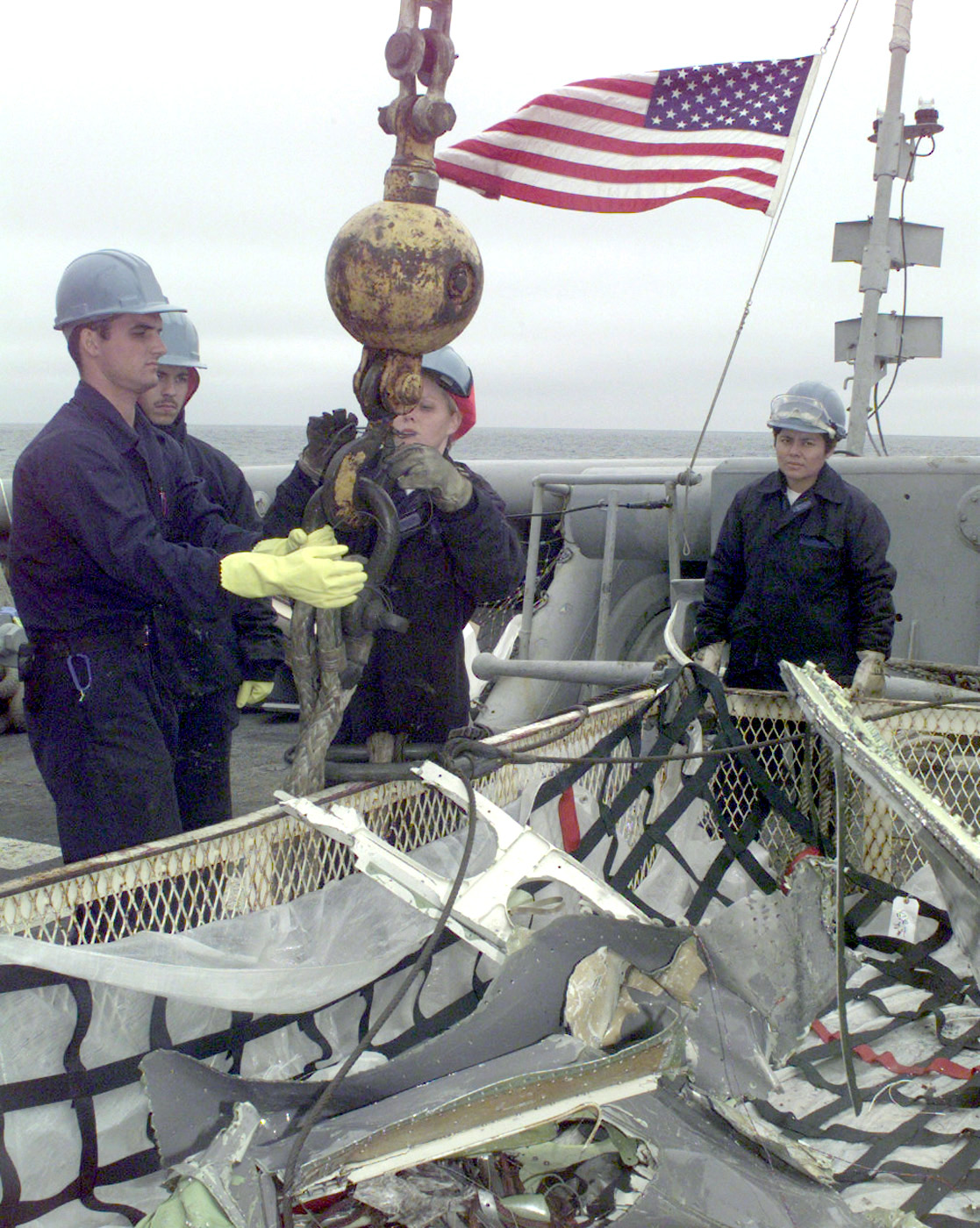
Crewmen of USS Grapple hooking up a basket containing debris from the crash site.

By the afternoon of 3 September, it was apparent that there were no survivors from the crash. On the morning of 4 September, JRCC Halifax de-tasked dedicated SAR assets and the Transportation Safety Board of Canada (TSB) were given control of the scene.

The aircraft broke up on impact with the water, and most of the debris sank to the ocean floor at a depth of 55 m (180 ft). Some debris was found floating in the crash area, and over the following weeks, debris washed up on nearby shorelines.

The initial focus of the recovery was on finding and identifying human remains and on recovering the flight recorders. As the force of impact was "in the order of at least 350 g", the aircraft was fragmented, and the environmental conditions only allowed the recovery of human remains along with the aircraft wreckage. Only one of the victims was visually identifiable. Eventually, 147 were identified by fingerprint, dental records, and X-ray comparisons. The remaining 81 were identified through DNA tests.

With CAF divers (navy clearance divers, port inspection divers, ship's team divers, and Army combat divers) working on the recovery, the Government of Canada requested a larger dedicated salvage recovery vessel from the Government of the United States. USS Grapple was tasked to the recovery effort, arriving from Philadelphia on 12 September. Among her crew were 32 salvage divers, and she welcomed two teams of Canadian Navy clearance divers that flew across Canada from Fleet Diving Unit (FDU) Pacific.

The cockpit voice recorder (CVR) and flight data recorder (FDR) were found by the Canadian submarine Okanagan using sonar to detect the underwater locator beacon signals and were quickly retrieved by Canadian Navy divers (the FDR on 6 September and the CVR on 11 September 1998). Both had stopped recording when the aircraft lost electrical power at approximately 10,000 ft (3,000 m), 5 minutes and 37 seconds before impact.

The recovery operation was guided by the TSB with resources from the Canadian Forces, Canadian Coast Guard, Royal Canadian Mounted Police, United States National Transportation Safety Board, and other agencies. The area was surveyed using route survey sonar, laser line scanners, and remotely operated vehicles (ROVs) to locate various items. After being located, the debris was then recovered (initially by divers and ROVs, later by dredging and trawling).

On 2 October 1998, the TSB initiated a heavy lift operation to retrieve major portions of the wreckage from deep water before expected winter storms began. By 21 October, an estimated 27% of the wreckage was recovered. At that point in the investigation, the crash was generally believed to have been caused by faulty wiring in the cockpit after the IFE system started to overheat. The TSB released its preliminary report on 30 August 2000 and the final report in 2003.

The final phase of wreckage recovery employed the ship Queen of the Netherlands to dredge the remaining aircraft debris. It concluded in December 1999 with 98% of the aircraft retrieved: approximately 127,000 kg (279,000 lb) of aircraft debris and 18,000 kg (40,000 lb) of cargo.

=== Response to victims' families and friends ===
JFK Airport used the JFK Ramada Plaza Hotel to house relatives and friends of the victims of the crash due to the hotel's central location relative to the airport. Jerome Hauer, the head of the emergency management task force of New York City, praised the swift actions of Swissair and codeshare partner Delta Air Lines in responding to the accident; he had criticized Trans World Airlines in its response to the TWA Flight 800 crash in 1996.

== Investigation ==
=== Identification of victims ===
The RCMP medical examiners positively identified most of the bodies within ten weeks of the accident. Due to extreme impact forces, only one body was identifiable by sight. DNA profiling was used to identify approximately one hundred bodies. At the time, it was "the largest DNA identification project ever undertaken in Canada". The RCMP contacted relatives of victims to request medical histories and dental records. They were also asked to provide blood samples for genetic matching in the DNA identification of the victims. About 90 bodies were identified by the medical examiners using dental records; owing to the large number of ante-mortem (before death) dental X-rays available to the examiners, these bodies were identified by late October 1998. Fingerprints and ante-mortem X-rays were used to identify around 30 bodies.

=== Examination of wreckage ===
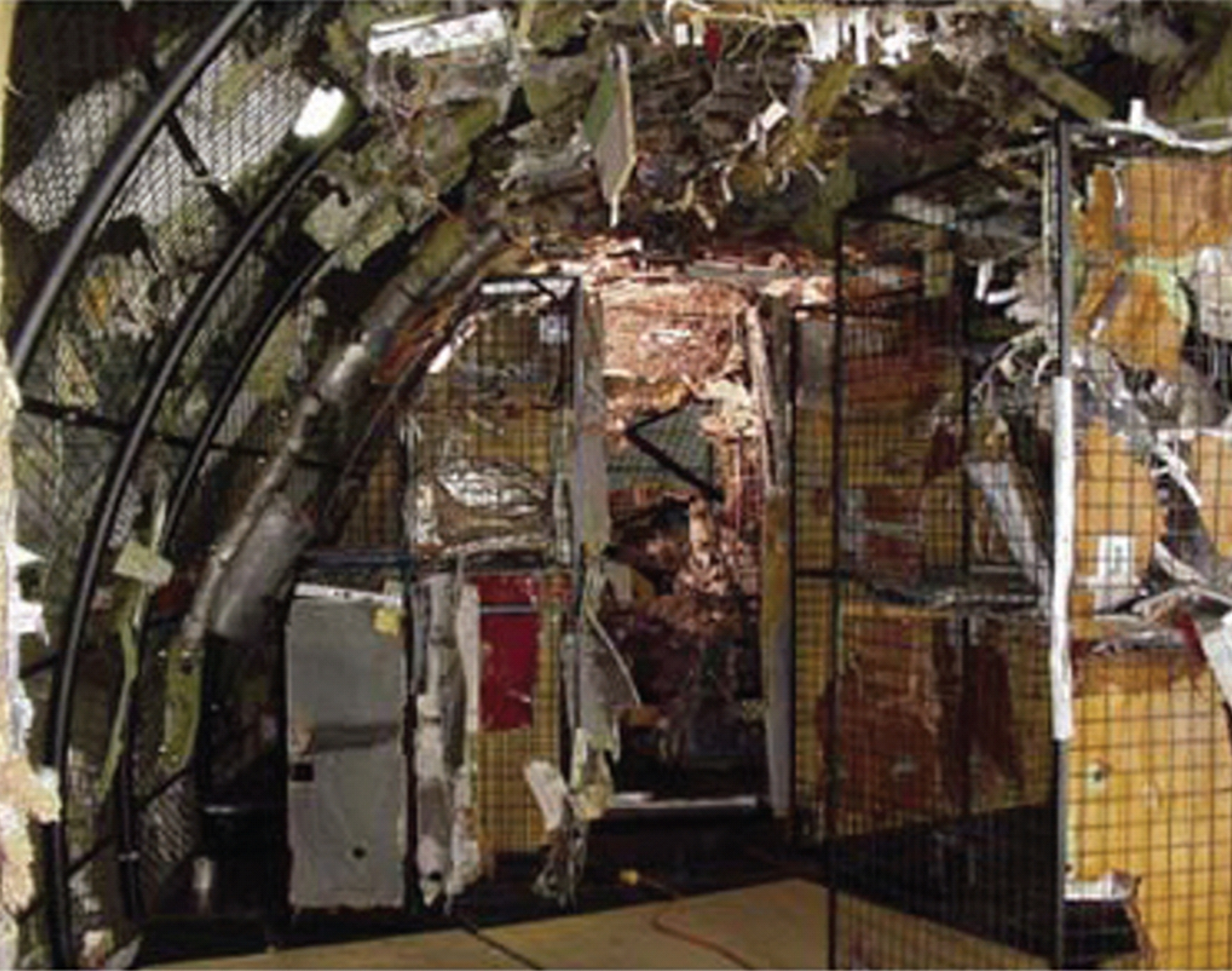
Reconstruction of the wreckage

An estimated 2 million pieces of debris were recovered and brought ashore for inspection at a secure handling facility in a marine industrial park at Sheet Harbour, where small material was hand-inspected by teams of RCMP officers looking for human remains, personal effects, and valuables from the aircraft's cargo hold. The material was then transported to CFB Shearwater, where it was sorted and inspected by over 350 investigators from multiple organizations and companies, including the Transportation Safety Board of Canada (TSB), the US National Transportation Safety Board, the US Federal Aviation Administration, the Swiss Aircraft Accident Investigation Bureau, Boeing, Pratt & Whitney, Air Line Pilots Association, and Swissair.

As each piece of wreckage was brought in, it was carefully cleaned with fresh water, sorted, and weighed. The item was then placed in a specific area of a hangar at CFB Shearwater, based on a grid system representing the various sections of the plane. All items deemed insignificant to the crash were stored with similar items in large boxes. When a box was full, it was weighed and moved to a custom-built temporary structure (J-Hangar) on a discontinued runway for long-term storage. If deemed significant to the investigation, the item was documented, photographed, and kept in the active examination hangar. Particular attention was paid to any item showing heat damage, burns, or other unusual marks. The front 10 m (33 ft) of the aircraft, from the front of the cockpit to near the front of the first-class passenger cabin, was reconstructed. Information gained by this allowed investigators to determine the severity and limits of the fire damage, its possible origins, and progression.

The lack of flight recorder data for the last six minutes of the flight added significant complexity to the investigation and was a major factor in its lengthy duration. The TSB team had to reconstruct the final six minutes entirely based on the physical evidence. The investigation became the largest and most expensive transport accident investigation in Canadian history, costing CA$57 million (US$48.5 million) over five years.

=== Cockpit recordings ===
The cockpit voice recorder used a 6-millimetre (1/4 in) recording tape that operated on a 30-minute loop. It therefore retained only that half-hour of the flight before the recorders failed, six minutes before the crash. The CVR recording and transcript were covered by a strict privilege under section 28 of the Canadian Transportation Accident Investigation and Safety Board Act and thus were not publicly disclosed, although the air traffic control recordings are less strictly privileged: section 29 of the same act provides only that they may not be used in certain legal proceedings. The air traffic control transcripts were released within days of the crash in 1998 and the air traffic control audio was released in May 2007, following a ruling by the Federal Court of Appeal. Several key minutes of the air traffic control audio can be found on the Toronto Star web site.

In 1999, an article in The Wall Street Journal alleged that the pilots disagreed about whether to dump fuel or descend straight to Halifax. Based on internal TSB summaries of the CVR recording, the Journal claimed that co-pilot Löw suggested steps aimed at a quick landing, which were ignored or rejected by Captain Zimmermann. Swissair and Canadian investigators would not comment on the accuracy of the reporting, with a TSB spokesman deeming it "a reporter's interpretation of a summary document of what might have been" on the CVR.

=== Probable cause ===
The Transportation Safety Board of Canada investigation identified eleven causes and contributing factors of the crash in its final report. The first and most prominent was the following:

Aircraft certification standards for material flammability were inadequate in that they allowed the use of materials that could be ignited and sustain or propagate fire. Consequently, flammable material propagated a fire that started above the ceiling on the right side of the cockpit near the cockpit rear wall. The fire spread and intensified rapidly to the extent that it degraded aircraft systems and the cockpit environment, and ultimately led to the loss of control of the aircraft.

Investigators identified evidence of arcing in wiring of the in-flight entertainment network (IFEN), but this did not trip the circuit breakers, which were not designed to trip on arcing. The investigation was unable to determine whether this arc was the "lead event" that was assumed to have ignited the flammable covering on MPET insulation blankets that quickly spread across other flammable materials. After the crew cut power to "non-essential" cabin systems, a reverse flow in the cockpit ventilation ducts increased the amount of smoke reaching the flight deck. By the time the crew became aware of the severity of the fire, it had become so extensive that it was impossible to address as it happened.

The rapid spread of electrical power failures led to the breakdown of key avionics systems, and the crew was soon rendered unable to control the aircraft. The pilot in command was forced to fly manually due to failure of the autopilot system and had no light by which to see his controls after the instrument lighting failed. The fuel-laden plane was above maximum landing weight, so the flight crew activated the dumping of fuel. The pilots lost all control, and the doomed plane flew into the ocean uncommanded. Recovered plane fragments show that the temperature inside the cockpit became so great that aluminium parts in the flight deck ceiling melted. The recovered standby attitude indicator and airspeed indicators showed that the aircraft struck the water at 300 knots (560 km/h; 350 mph) in a 20-degree nose-down and 110-degree bank attitude; the impact force of the aircraft crashing into the Atlantic Ocean was calculated to be 350 times the force of gravity (G-force). Death was instantaneous for all passengers and crew due to the impact forces and deceleration.

==== In-flight entertainment network ====
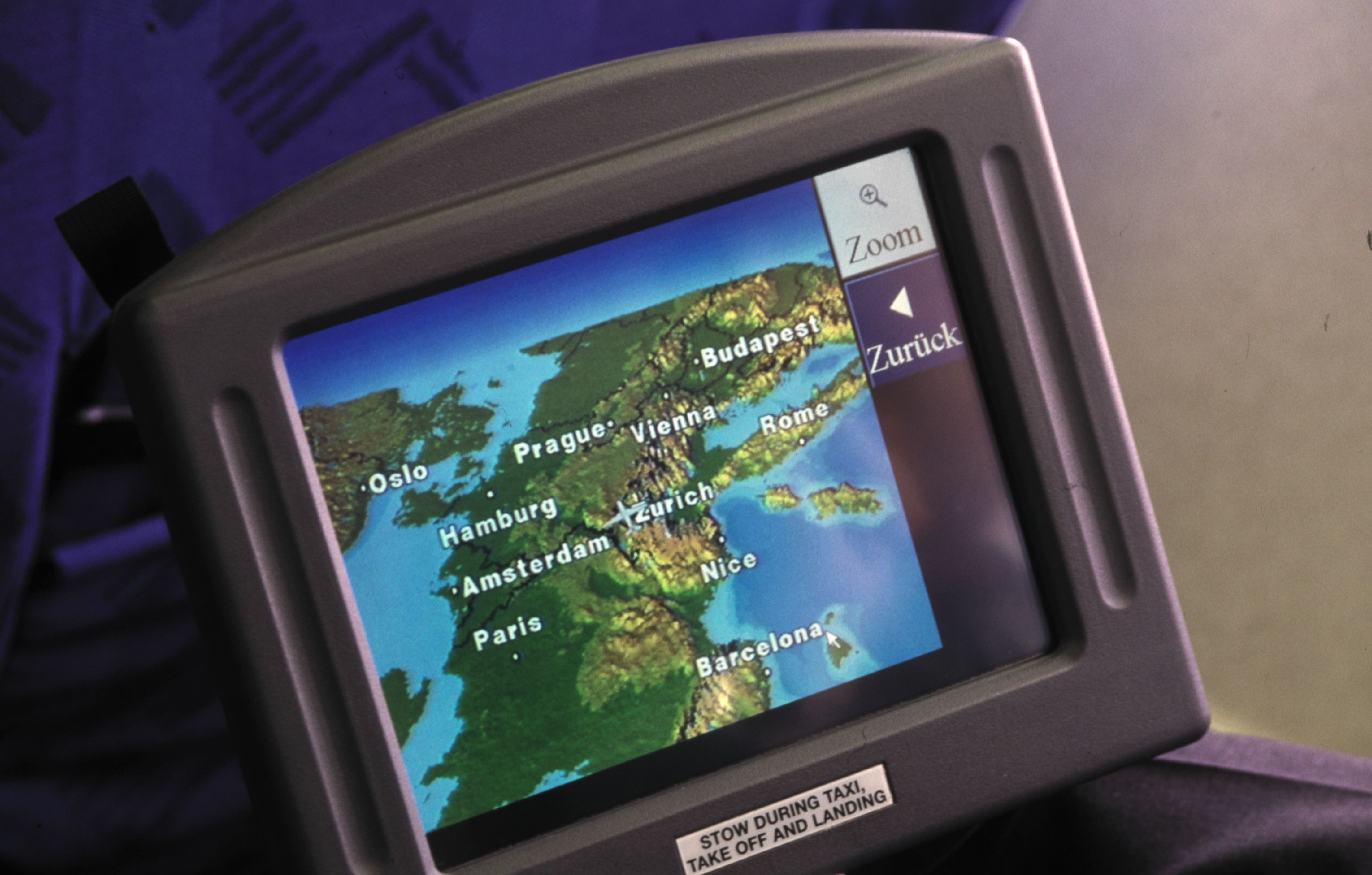
Touchscreen in-flight entertainment system aboard a Swissair MD-11 (1997)

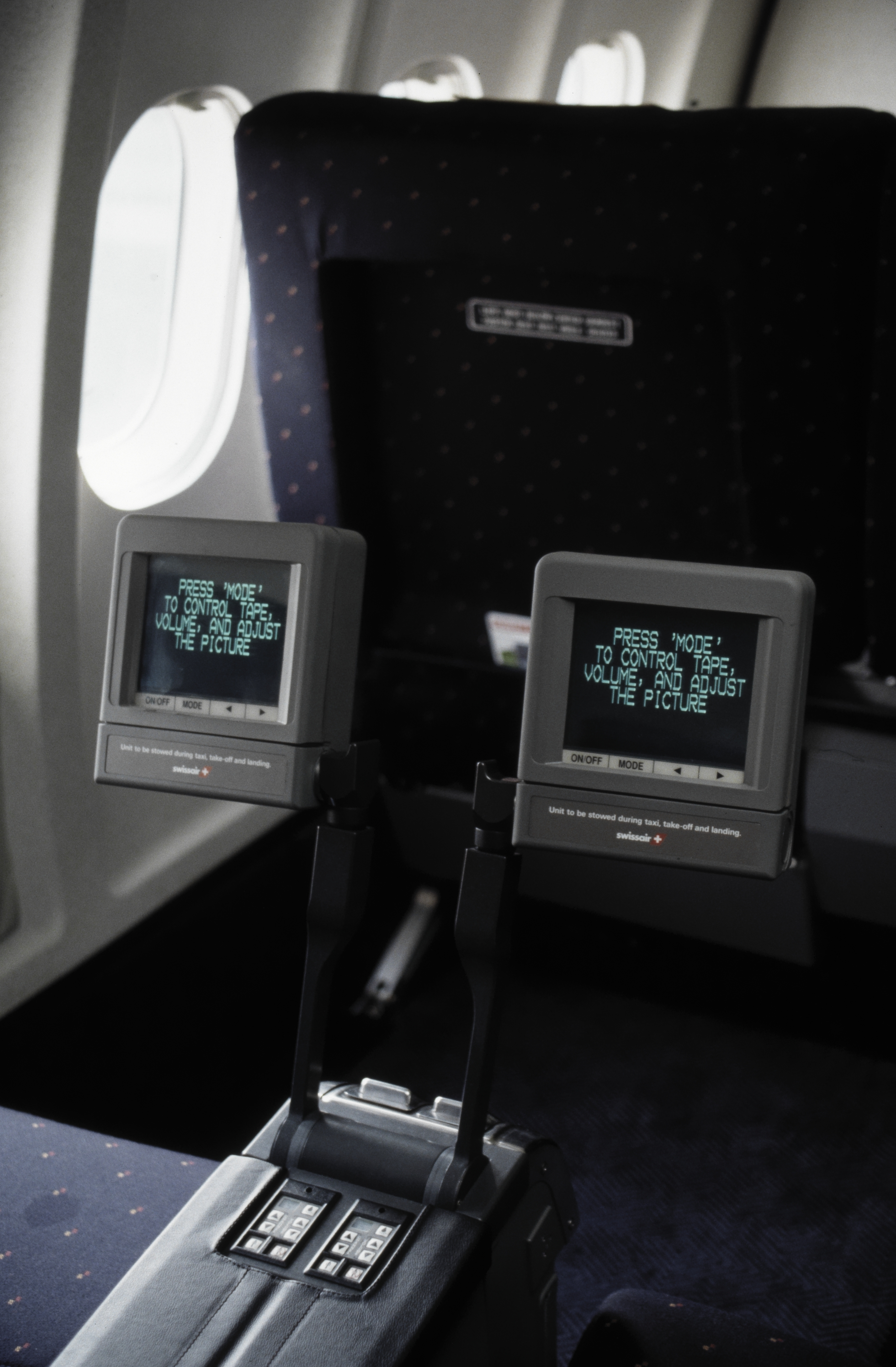
Video system aboard a Swissair MD-11 (1999)

Both first and business class seats were equipped with a Windows NT 4.0-based In-Flight Entertainment Network (IFEN) system with touchscreen in-seat video displays and magnetic card readers. In the galley, a cabin file server served as a central hub for managing content, which facilitated movie downloads, stored flight and casino information, and collected credit card data transmitted from each seat.

The original system design provided IFEN to all 257 seats. Originally, the IFEN was to be powered from the cabin power distribution, but it could not deliver enough power for the complete IFEN setup intended for the 257-seat configuration. As a result, a 115-volt three-phase 400 Hz AC Bus 2, located in the cockpit area (the origin of the fire), was used to provide most of the IFEN power requirements. In April 1997 the IFEN configuration was reduced only to 61 first and business class seats.

By design, AC Bus 2 remained active even when the "CABIN BUS" switch was turned off. The purpose of using the "CABIN BUS" switch, which was the first step in Swissair's "Smoke/Fumes of Unknown Origin" checklist during the incident, was to cut off most electrical power to the aircraft cabin, which was not helpful in the system design where IFEN was connected to AC Bus 2.

Former employees of Interactive Flight Technologies, the company that manufactured the IFEN, conceded that each entertainment system box, which processed all information for the passenger interface, was positioned under each passenger seat and emitted excessive heat. Others raised concerns that extended to the high power consumption and overall heat generation of the system.

Installation of IFEN at Swissair was rushed and violated various FAA certification procedures. According to Swissair Operational Engineering, IFEN added more than 1,000 kilograms (2,200 lb) of weight to the plane.

=== Safety recommendations ===
The TSB made nine recommendations relating to changes in aircraft materials (testing, certification, inspection, and maintenance), electrical systems, and flight data capture, as both flight recorders had stopped when they lost power six minutes before impact. General recommendations were also made regarding improvements in checklists and in fire-detection and fire-fighting equipment and training. These recommendations led to widespread changes in Federal Aviation Administration standards, principally affecting wiring and fire hardening.

== Legacy ==
=== Valuables ===
The plane's manifest indicated the presence of a significant quantity of valuables, including 0.9 kg (2 lb) of diamonds from the "Nature of Diamonds" exhibition at the American Museum of Natural History, 1.8 kg (4 lb) of watches, 4.5 kg (10 lb) of jewellery, and 49 kg of cash intended for a U.S. bank in Geneva. Two paintings, Le Peintre (The Painter) by Pablo Picasso and an unidentified work, were also onboard the aircraft and destroyed in the accident. Le Peintre was estimated at US$1.5 million (equivalent to US$2.96 million in 2025) in value. Insurer Lloyd's of London reportedly paid out an estimated $300 million for the lost diamonds and jewels. The company applied for a treasure-trove license from the Nova Scotia government to search the crash site but faced opposition from victims' relatives, leading to the withdrawal of the application.

Following the crash, a 2-square-kilometre (0.77 sq mi) exclusion zone was established around the site and maintained for over a year to secure the scene. Despite restrictions, concerns arose regarding potential unauthorized attempts to search for valuables. Halifax-based TV documentary producer John Wesley Chisholm suggested that treasure hunters might have covertly explored the area in the years following the crash.

=== Lawsuit ===
In September 1999, Swissair, Delta Air Lines, and Boeing (which had acquired McDonnell Douglas through a merger in 1997) agreed to share liability for the accident and offered the families of the passengers financial compensation. The offer was rejected in favour of a $19.8 billion suit against Swissair and DuPont, the supplier of the Mylar insulation sheathing. A US federal court ruled against punitive damages in February 2002. The resulting compensations for one group of plaintiffs totaled over $13 million.

=== Memorials and tributes ===
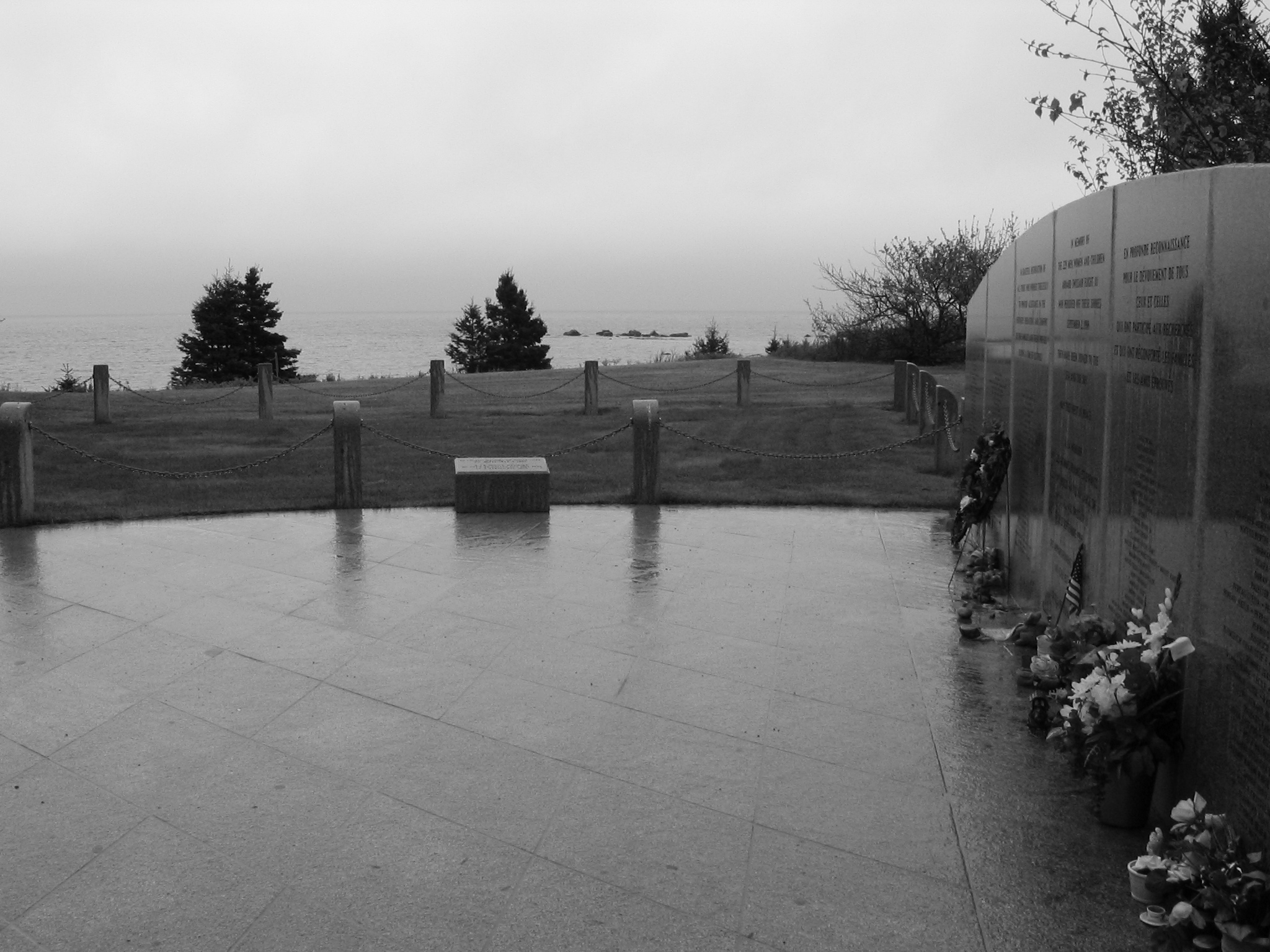
Bayswater, Nova Scotia, memorial

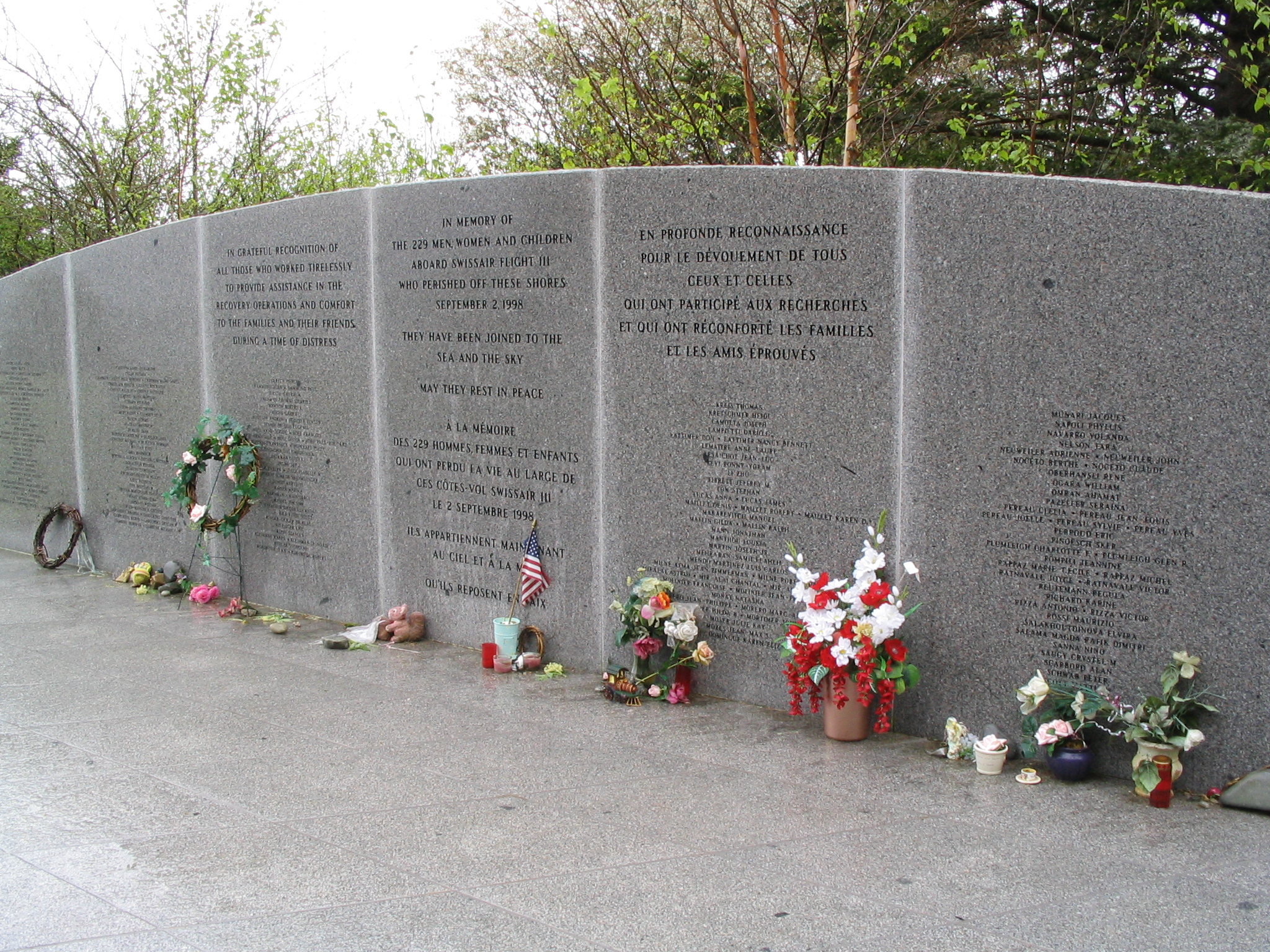
Flowers at the Bayswater memorial

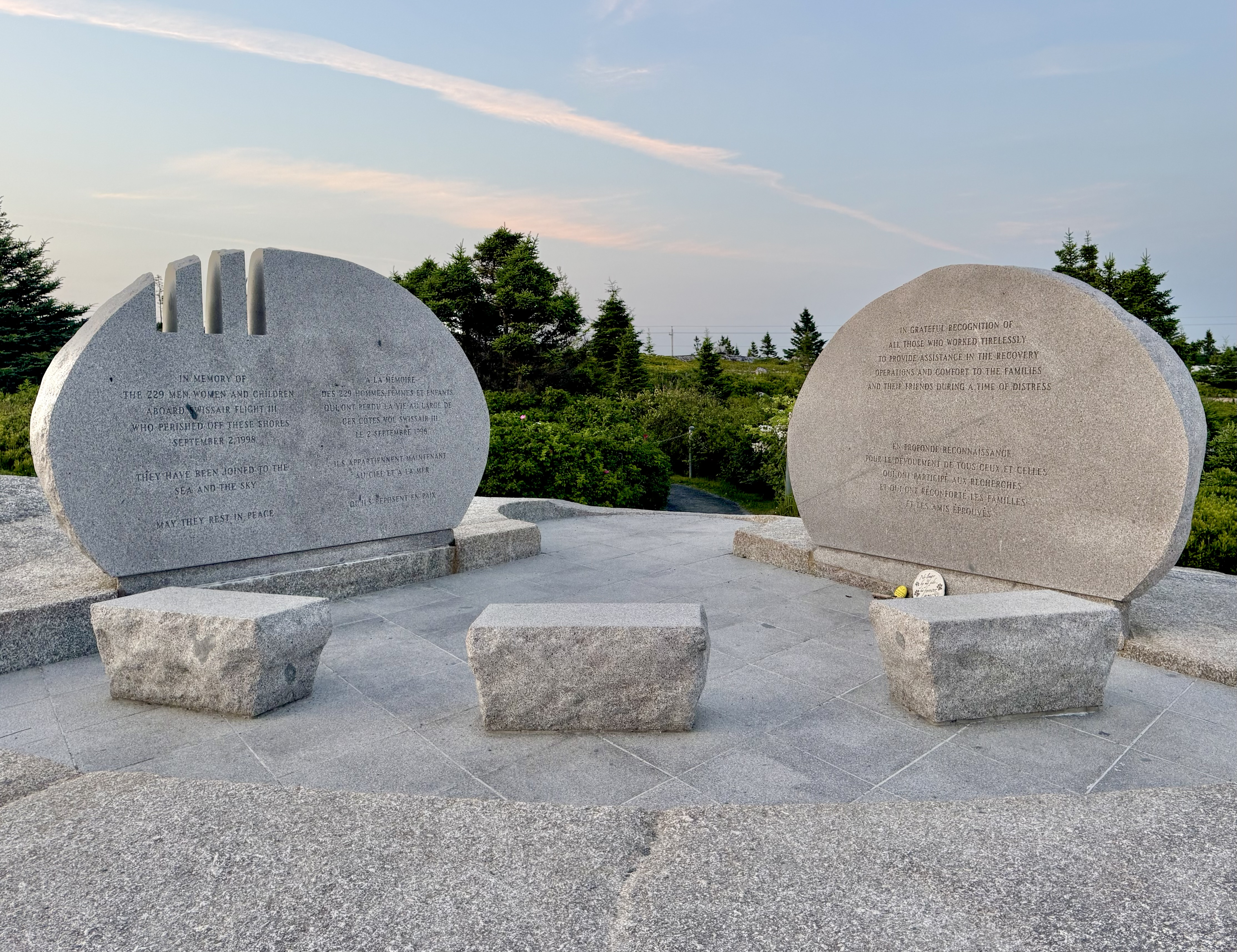
Memorial, Peggys Cove, Nova Scotia

A non-denominational memorial service was held on the grounds of East St. Margaret's Elementary School in Indian Harbour on 9 September 1998. Among those in attendance were 175 relatives of the crash victims, Swiss president Flavio Cotti, Canadian prime minister Jean Chrétien and Nova Scotia premier Russell MacLellan. A memorial service was also held in Zürich on 11 September 1998. The following year, another memorial was held in Nova Scotia.

Two memorials to those who died in the crash were established by the Government of Nova Scotia. One is to the east of the crash site at The Whalesback, a promontory 1 kilometre (0.62 mi; 0.54 nmi) north of Peggys Cove. The second is a more private but much larger commemoration located west of the crash site near Bayswater Beach Provincial Park on the Aspotogan Peninsula in Bayswater. Here, the unidentified remains of the victims are interred. A fund was established to maintain the memorials, and the government passed an act to recognize the memorials. Various other charitable funds were also created, including one in the name of a young victim from Louisiana, Robert Martin Maillet, which provided money for children in need, and one in the name of Robert's mother, Karen E. Maillet-Domingue (also a victim), which granted scholarships.

The third episode of Mayday was devoted to the accident as "Fire on Board".

111 Echoes from Halifax, a Canadian-Swiss coproduced drama film about the incident directed by Mauro Mueller, is slated to premiere at the 2026 Atlantic International Film Festival.

=== Aftermath and effects on the industry ===
After the crash of Flight 111, the flight designator for Swissair's New York–Geneva route was changed to SR139, although the route was still operated by MD-11 aircraft. The crash of Flight 111 was a severe blow to Swissair, and the airline suffered even more loss following the accident, particularly as the in-flight entertainment system that was blamed for causing the accident had been installed on the aircraft to attract more passengers. It was disconnected following the Transportation Safety Board discovery on 29 October 1998 and eventually removed from both Swissair fleets of 15 MD-11s and 3 Boeing 747-300s. Swissair later went bankrupt shortly after the September 11 attacks in 2001, an event that caused a significant and widespread disruption to the aviation transportation industry, though that was namely due to the airline's 'Hunter Strategy'.

Following the bankruptcy of Swissair in 2001, their international traffic rights were passed to Crossair, who took over Swissair's route network and fleet and began operating flights as the newly renamed Swiss International Air Lines, changing the flight designator for the New York–Geneva route to LX023. The MD-11 was retired from the Swiss fleet in 2004, and the flight today is operated by an Airbus A330-300.

== See also ==
- Aviation accidents and incidents

=== Similar events ===
- South African Airways Flight 295 – another aviation accident which occurred due to inflight fire (1987)
- EgyptAir Flight 804—another case of fire in the cockpit (2016)
