= Hubbards, Nova Scotia =

Community in Nova Scotia, Canada

Hubbards
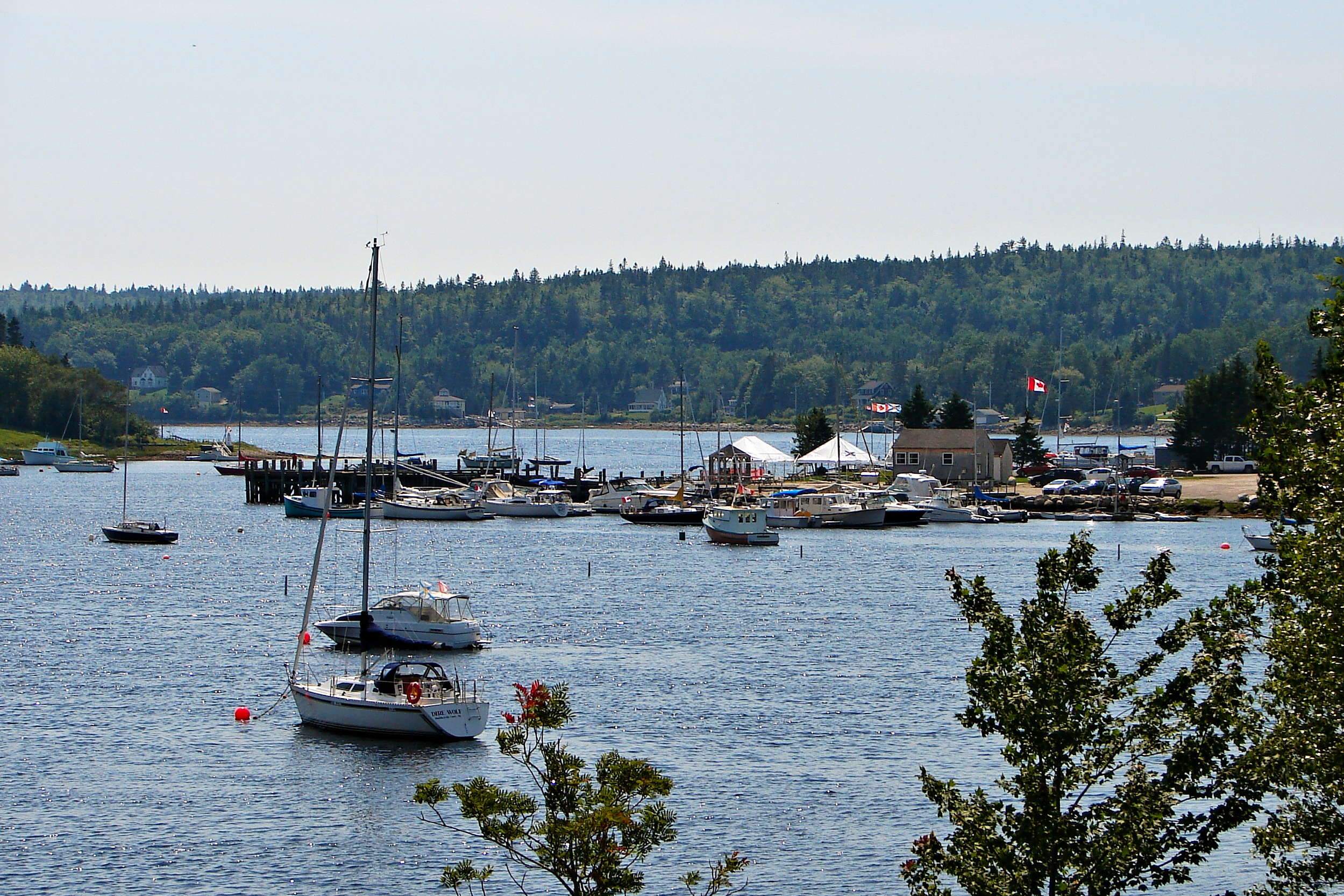

- Location within Nova Scotia
- Coordinates: 44.6428°N 64.0517°W
- Country: Canada
- Province: Nova Scotia
- Municipality: Halifax Regional Municipality
- Community council: Western Region Community Council
- Planning Area: St. Margarets Bay

Area
  - Total: 2.29 km^{2} (0.88 sq mi)

Population (2021 census)
  - Total: 654
- Telephone Exchanges: 782, 902

Hubbards is an unincorporated Canadian rural community on the South Shore of Nova Scotia.

== Geography ==
Hubbards is located on the eastern side of the Aspotogan Peninsula, and along the northern shore of St. Margarets Bay. It borders the communities of Simms Settlement and Queensland.

Hubbards sits astride the county line bordering Halifax County and Lunenburg County and is located in the Halifax Regional Municipality and Chester Municipal District respectively.

Hubbards is located approximately 50 kilometres west of Downtown Halifax and 50 kilometres east of Bridgewater on Highway 103.

== History ==
Hubbards was first settled by French-speaking Protestants, brothers John (1757–1835) and Frederick Dauphinee. As with all those who first settled the east side of the Aspotogan Peninsula, the brothers arrived from across St. Margaret's Bay at French Village, Nova Scotia. Their father emigrated from Montbéliard, France to Halifax and then to Lunenburg. Captain John Dauphinee settled on what became known as Dauphinee's Point. In 1820, John Dauphinee began a lumber mill on Mill Lake.

The origin of the name Hubbard's is likely a corruption of the name Hibbard, Hubert or Hibbert. (The first School in Hubbards was named "Hibbert's Cove School".) The Village was Hubbards Cove until the word "Cove" was dropped (1905). The Fitzroy River which runs through Hubbards may have been named after British Prime Minister Augustus FitzRoy, 3rd Duke of Grafton (1735–1811).

In the earlier part of the 20th century, Hubbards was a successful fishing community. During the Cold War, the Canadian Forces established a naval radio station at Mill Cove in 1967. CFS Mill Cove was a major employer in the Hubbards area until its automation in the 1990s when it was downgraded to Naval Radio Station Mill Cove.

== Demographics ==
In the 2021 Census of Population conducted by Statistics Canada, Hubbards had a population of 387 living in 192 of its 283 total private dwellings, a change of 6.3% from its 2016 population of 364. With a land area of 2.29 km^{2} (0.88 sq mi), it had a population density of 169.0/km^{2} (437.7/sq mi) in 2021.

== Tourism ==
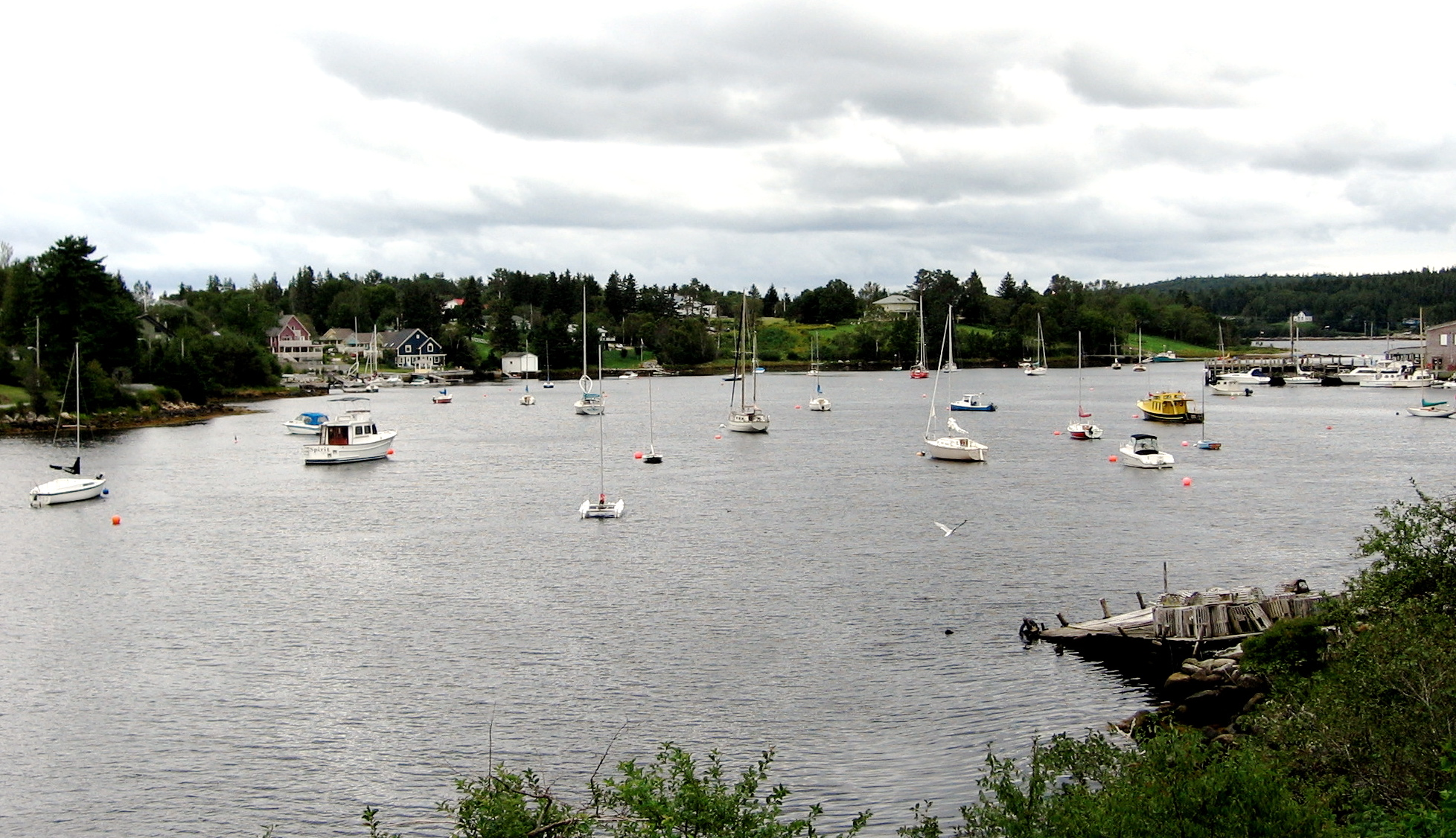
Hubbards Cove in summer

Hubbards is a popular summer vacation destination. Numerous cottages, inns, campgrounds, restaurants and the Shore Club contribute to a healthy summer economy. The Hubbards and Area Business Association works to sustain a "shop local" economy. Hubbards features a picturesque locale, especially on Hubbards Cove, with a yacht club, Nova Scotia's smallest provincial park, campground and 10 beaches within "driving distance" of one another.

The CBC television series Black Harbour was shot on location in Hubbards between 1996 and 1999.

The movie Relative Happiness (2014) was filmed on location in Hubbards.

== Shatford Trust Fund ==
Oil magnate Jefferson Davis ("J.D.") Shatford was born in Hubbards in 1862, died 5 September 1955 in Daytona Beach, Florida, and is buried in Hubbards' Pine Hill Cemetery. His will established the J.D. Shatford Memorial Trust, "for the benefit of the people of Hubbards community". Local residents graduating from high school receive bursaries from the trust for post-secondary education. The Shatford Trust Fund also built the J.D. Shatford Memorial Library, the Hubbards firehall, and supplied funding to churches and other community facilities.

== Parks ==
- Cleveland Beach Provincial Park
- Hubbards Provincial Park
- Hubbards Community Waterfront and Park
- Queensland Beach Provincial Park
