= CFS Mill Cove =

Naval radio station in Nova Scotia, Canada

Coordinates: 44.5896°N 64.0683°W

Canadian Forces Station Mill Cove (CFS Mill Cove) is a former Canadian Forces Station and currently a naval radio station located near Hubbards, Nova Scotia. Built in 1967, it is remotely operated by the Canadian Forces from CFB Halifax.

== History ==
CFS Mill Cove was established in 1967 on the Aspotogan Peninsula 50 km west of Halifax on the shores of St. Margaret's Bay near the village of Hubbards. The station replaced NRS Albro Lake which was the primary receiving station for naval communications on the Atlantic coast. Encroaching urban development in Dartmouth was creating interference with NRS Albro Lake reception. The actual unit HMC NRS Albro Lake was redesignated CFS Mill Cove at the time that the Albro Lake facility was relocated.

The primary transmitting station at NRS Newport Corner, 50 km northwest of Halifax in the rural farming hamlet of Brooklyn was maintained and the naval radio station functioned as a detachment of CFS Mill Cove.

While the receiving antenna site at Mill Cove was located in the middle of the Aspotogan Peninsula, the station's headquarters and housing area was located on the shore of St. Margarets Bay in the fishing hamlet of Mill Cove.

Defence cutbacks in the late 1990s saw CFS Mill Cove decommissioned and the Mill Cove receiver renamed NRS Mill Cove. Both the NRS Newport Corner transmitter and NRS Mill Cove receivers were automated and are currently operated by HMCS Trinity at CFB Halifax. Today both facilities have the prefix Naval Radio Station (NRS) in front of their geographic location; they function as detachments to CFB Halifax.
