= East River, Nova Scotia =

Community in Nova Scotia, Canada

Coordinates: 44°35′11″N 64°9′59″W

East River in Nova Scotia

East River is a community in the Canadian province of Nova Scotia, located in the Chester Municipal District on the Aspotogan Peninsula on the Lighthouse Route at the junction of (Nova Scotia Route 329) and Trunk 3.

== History ==
The village was known as East River Point, and before that Indian Point. It got its name from the river because it is on the eastern side of Mahone Bay. 120 acres (0.49 km^{2}) of land there reserved for John, Joseph and Thomas Paul, who were Mi’kmaq on September 3, 1793. At East River, David Floyd received a grant on August 18, 1815, and John Wheaton received in April 1817. John Booth's grant was dated September 22, 1899. (Places, p. 190) All these people are unknown.

Cook's Beach was named for Ephraim Cook a direct descendant of Francis Cook of the Mayflower. He (Ephraim) settled with his family on land in Lower Melbourne near Cooks Beach (named in his honor). He was one of the first settlers in Yarmouth.

Who the following landmarks are named after is unknown: Meisners Beach, G. Roast, L. Roast (Church Map)

Rous Point and Rous Cove is named after Captain John Rous who led the naval operations off Nova Scotia during Father Le Loutre's War.
