= Aspotogan, Nova Scotia =

Community in Nova Scotia, Canada

Aspotogan
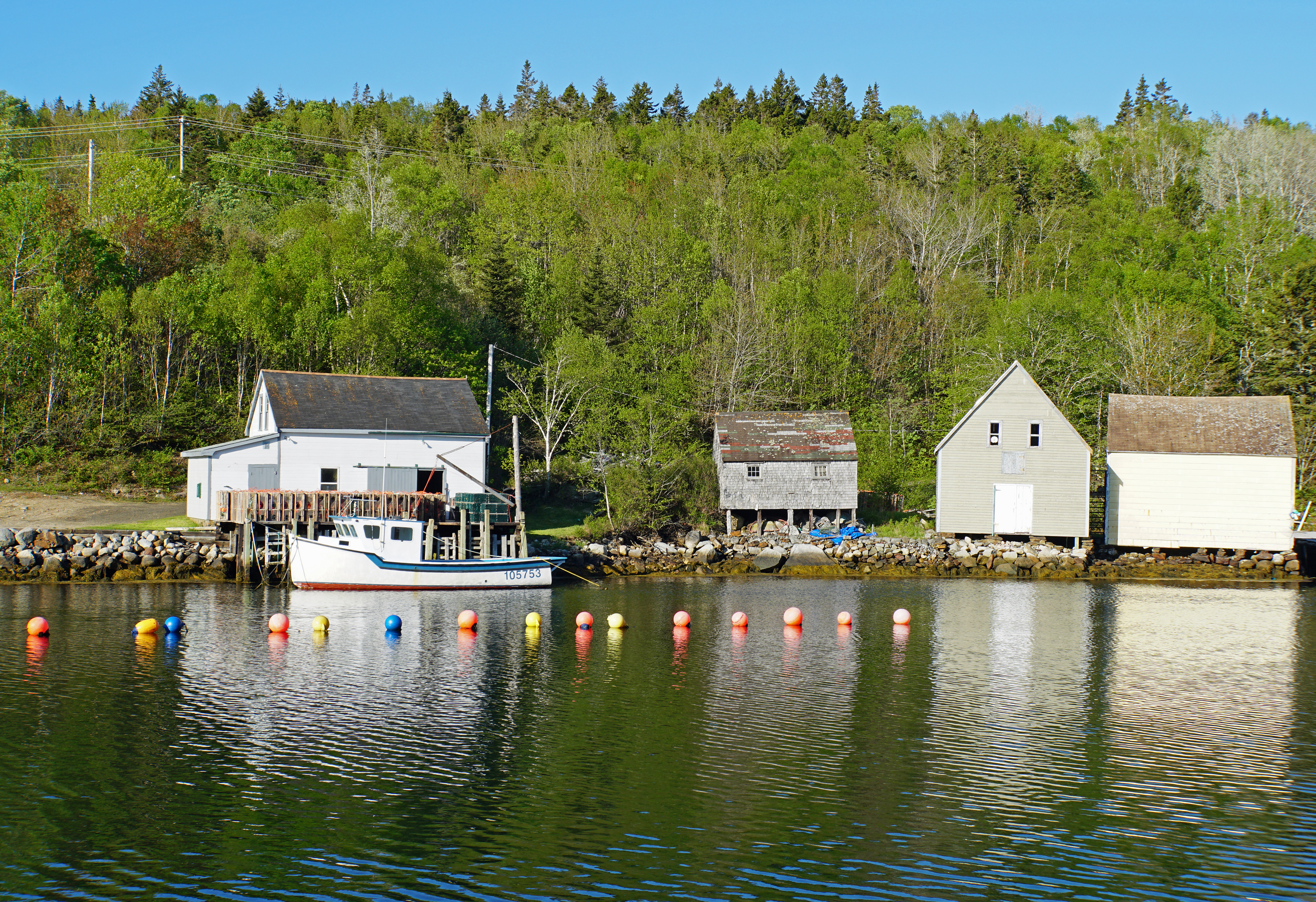

- Aspotogan in Nova Scotia
- Coordinates: 44°31′3.33″N 64°2′58.27″W
- Country: Canada
- Province: Nova Scotia
- County: Lunenburg
- Municipal district: Chester

Aspotogan (/ˌæspəˈtoʊɡən/) is a small fishing community in the Canadian province of Nova Scotia, located in the Chester Municipal District on the Aspotogan Peninsula. There is a public wharf in Aspotogan Harbour.

Aspotogan is at the head of Aspotogan Harbour, which gets its name from the Mi'kmaq Ashmutogun or Ukpudeskakun meaning "block the passageway" or "where the seals go in and out".

== Transportation ==
Aspotogan is on the Lighthouse Route (Nova Scotia Route 329).
