= The Lodge, Nova Scotia =

Community in Nova Scotia, Canada

Coordinates: 44°33′22.2″N 64°1′54.31″W

The Lodge in Nova Scotia

The Lodge is a small community in the Canadian province of Nova Scotia, located in the Chester Municipal District on the Aspotogan Peninsula. Its only significant road is Nova Scotia Route 329, on the Lighthouse Route.

== History ==
Charles and George Verge were brothers who were the first settlers of the Lodge (c. 1832). They arrived in the area from Liverpool, Nova Scotia. Their father immigrated as a New England Planter from Scituate, Plymouth Colony, Massachusetts to Liverpool Nova Scotia (c. 1779).
