= Mill Cove, Nova Scotia =

Community in Nova Scotia, Canada

Coordinates: 44°35′11″N 64°3′48″W

Mill Cove in Nova Scotia

Mill Cove is a community in the Canadian province of Nova Scotia, located in the Chester Municipal District on the Aspotogan Peninsula on the Lighthouse Route (Nova Scotia Route 329). The community was home to CFS Mill Cove from 1967 til the 1990s.

== History ==
Mill Cove was originally granted to Jacque Louis Jollimore (1754-1833) age 38 and John Troop (1792), after both men and their families had lived in the community for many decades.

James Lewis Jollimore was born in Lunenburg and was the first to settle at Mill Cove with his wife Catherine (c. 1778). They had nine children at Mill Cove. James's father was a French Protestant who came from Montbeliard, France to settle in Lunenburg. James's father was part of the "foreign protestant" migration from Europe to Nova Scotia. Jacques Louis's name was later anglicized to James Lewis. He died a year after he was officially granted 500 acres (2.0 km^{2}) of land at Mill Cove at age 79 (1782). He is buried in Mill Cove.

John Troop arrived in Nova Scotia in 1774. 18 years later Troop received 500 acres (2.0 km^{2}) at Mill Cove (1792). Two years later, Troop purchased a lot on the burial ground of St. Peters (1810) church across St. Margaret's Bay at Hacketts Cove (formerly Haggets Cove). The burial ground was the first in St. Margaret's Bay (1794).
