= Aspotogan Sea Spa =

Luxury hotel development in the Aspotogan Peninsula, Nova Scotia, Canada

- Location within Nova Scotia
- Former names: Sea Spa Nova Scotia

General information
- Status: Demolished
- Location: Aspotogan Peninsula, Nova Scotia
- Coordinates: 44.5105°N 64.0169°W
- Construction started: 1992
- Demolished: 2016

Technical details
- Floor count: 5
- Floor area: 16,300 square metres (175,000 sq ft)
- Lifts/elevators: 2

Design and construction
- Architecture firm: Sperry and Associates

Other information
- Number of rooms: 131

The Aspotogan Sea Spa was a luxury hotel development at the tip of the Aspotogan Peninsula, Nova Scotia, Canada. Construction was aborted in the mid-1990s when the developer ran out of money, leaving the hulking hotel building sitting abandoned for two decades until it was demolished in 2016.

== History ==
The Sea Spa Nova Scotia, as it was called when first marketed in 1990, was privately financed by German siblings Brigitta Hennig and Wolfgang Spiegelhauer of the construction company Suwobau. The two stated that they were "deeply impressed by the beauty of the land" and conceived the 131-room, five-storey, 16,300 square metres (175,000 sq ft) luxury resort to be developed at an estimated cost of C$37.5 million on a site of more than 120 hectares. They predicted that Europeans would flock to the hotel to enjoy a range of stress-relieving activities including seashore walks, bodybuilding, underwater massage, electrical therapy, and electro-galvanic and carbon-dioxide baths. The hotel was to feature an indoor saltwater pool, special air-filtration systems, and the use of non-toxic construction materials. The project received $10,000 from the Atlantic Canada Opportunities Agency to assist in marketing. The spa was a welcome development in an area hit by the decline of the fishing industry, and was expected to employ up to 200 people.

Construction began in 1992. In 1994, after the hotel structure was substantially complete and weather-tight, the developers ran out of money and couldn't secure additional financing after sinking more than $20 million into the project. One of their partners had dropped out of the project, and the value of their assets in Germany had reportedly depreciated following the reunification of that country. The collapse of the project left many contractors unpaid, putting some smaller companies out of business. In late 1996 creditors forced a foreclosure sale to two Halifax developers, Jim Spatz and George Armoyan, for a mere $505,759.

Spatz and Armoyan tried for years, to no avail, to resell the development to a hotel company. In a 2015 interview, Spatz stated that as the building aged they felt it became less and less likely that it would ever be completed, so they decided to demolish it. Demolition began in late 2015. The site will be subdivided into private residential lots.
