= Fox Point, Nova Scotia =

Community in Nova Scotia, Canada

Coordinates: 44°37′18.31″N 64°3′30.72″W

Fox Point in Nova Scotia

Fox Point is a community in the Canadian province of Nova Scotia. It is located on the Aspotogan Peninsula and is part of the Chester Municipal District. It is accessed via the Lighthouse Route (Nova Scotia Route 329). The community may have been named after the British abolitionist politician Charles James Fox (1749–1806).

== History ==
The Indigenous Mi'kmaq people are believed to have had a migratory cycle, moving to the Fox Point area during summer, and then returning inland to Shubenacadie during winter.

Today, the Fox Point community includes a wharf and a Seventh-day Adventist Church.
