= Blandford, Nova Scotia =

Community in Nova Scotia, Canada

Coordinates: 44°29′35.2″N 64°6′35.9″W

Blandford in Nova Scotia

Blandford is a community in the Canadian province of Nova Scotia, located in the Chester Municipal District on the Aspotogan Peninsula on the Lighthouse Route (Nova Scotia Route 329). Blandford originally included the present day communities of New Harbour, Upper Blandford, and Deep Cove.

== History ==
=== Origins ===
Between 1767–1769, the English from the west country settled Blandford, naming the community after Blandford Forum. One of the first settlers of Blandford was George Casper Zinck (c. 1764–), the son of a German-speaking immigrant. George first lived in Lunenburg and then after the American Raid on Lunenburg (1782) during the American Revolution, George moved to nearby Rose Bay before finally settling in Blandford at the age of 20 (1784). He married and then had his first child the following year.

Along with English and German settlers, there were also Jewish settlers to Blandford. More likely at least some of the Jewish family Levy in this part of Nova Scotia are descended from Nathaniel Levy who was in Halifax by 1759. After his first wife died in 1771 he moved from Halifax to Chester where he married again 1773 (Susannah Tufts). They had four children before he died in May 1787 at Chester. One of his sons, Gershom, married in 1796 (Catherine Barbara Graves). They had three sons before he died in 1801 at Chester. Two of his sons, David (born 1797) and Nathan (born 1798) settled in Tancook Island during the early nineteenth century. Their descendants migrated to Blandford.

Nathaniel Levy was the son of Nathan Levy, a Jewish merchant who was in Philadelphia in 1746 (Punch, 1981). Nathaniel Levy may have been in the colony to oversee the interests of the firm Levy and Frank of Philadelphia, one of the firms that provided the new colony with supplies and credit (Fergusson, 1971:46).

The village of Deep Cove was first settled by John (Johannes) Meisner (1789-1872) and John Seaburg (Seaboyer) in 1838. John Meisner owned the first gristmill which was built on the north side of Deep Cove. Meisner's Point on the Upper Blandford road still retains his name.

The person who Mathias Hill, Bovens Lake, and Jimmy's Island in Deep Cove is named after is unknown.

When settlers first arrived at Blandford, in the winter they were able to walk over the ice to Tancook and to Chester. In 1845, Charles Lordly, Esq had goods hauled from Shoal Cove (Blandford) by three pairs of oxen and two horses over the ice to Tancook. The ice was cut with axes to a depth of two feet without finding water. The following month he had molasses and barrels of four hauled over the ice to Chester. Mr. Arch Zinck reported the last time people were able to walk to Tancook over the ice was 1932.

=== Fenian Raids ===
To ward off the threat of possible Fenian raids (1866–71), a volunteer regiment was raised in Blandford. The troop of men did drills on what was once the field of Morton Publicover (Civic #?). Among these men were Jim Gates, George Roast and Will Gates.

The Fenian movement sought to bring about Irish independence from Britain. At the end of the American Civil War, Fenians in the United States determined to recruit veterans of the war, invade and capture Canada, and force Britain to negotiate the independence of Ireland. There were a number of alarms in 1865, 1866 and 1870. There was a medal given for service in the Volunteer Regiments.

Regimental troops were raised in every county across Nova Scotia. While New Brunswick and Ontario did sustain attacks, Nova Scotia did not. Perhaps to amplify the importance of the local regiment, folklore in the community includes a story of a Fenian attack by sea at Big Cove that was thwarted by the Mi'kmaq.

=== Cyrus Eaton ===
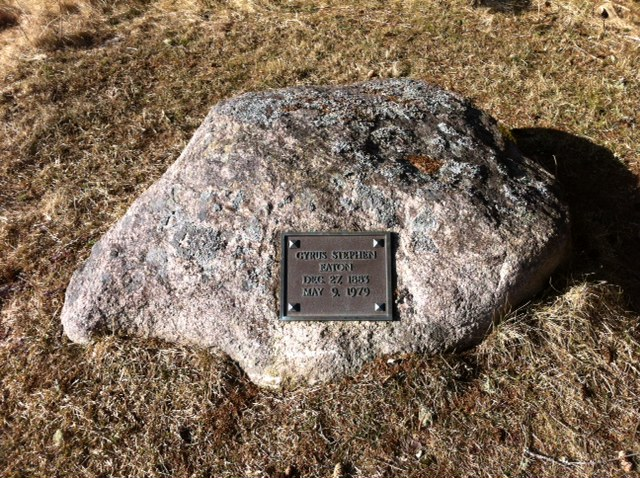
Cyrus Eaton Gravesite of his ashes, Deep Cove, Nova Scotia

One of the most renowned people to make Deep Cove their home was Cyrus Eaton, a millionaire industrialist, who was originally from Pugwash, Nova Scotia, but lived in Ohio. He bought a large piece of land in Blandford between 1931 – 1933. The estate covered woodland, run-down farms, and a number of lakes. Mr. Eaton turned this estate into a sanctuary for Canada Geese. The Canada Geese still remain here all winter and can often be seen walking down the road or swimming just off shore.

In the 1950s, a successful banker, businessman and philanthropist, Cyrus Eaton, was raising Mallard ducks and Canada geese in the vicinity of Hollahan Lake. In 1959 the area became a wildlife sanctuary where these birds could feed undisturbed. Hunting of waterfowl and game birds was prohibited. In 2007 it became a protected area under the Special Places Protection Act, giving the sanctuary the province's highest level of protection of plants and animals. Access is restricted to visitors on foot. The reserve contains a wide variety of habitats and is home to some rare lichens, mosses, and vascular plants, not the least of which is an extensive Jack Pine barrens. Blandford Nature Reserve is the province's 16th nature reserve and is the first of its kind in Lunenburg County.

In an address to the Empire Club of Canada (1950), Cyrus S. Eaton was introduced with the following:

Mr. Eaton also owns and operated a 3,000-acre farm near Chester, Nova Scotia, and an 870-acre farm at Northfield, Ohio, specializing in the raising of pure bred and registered Scotch Shorthorn cattle. I rather suspect that of all his undertakings Mr. Eaton has a very special interest in farming because our invitation to address this meeting reached him at his farm in Nova Scotia and, in his very welcome and very prompt reply accepting our invitation, he did say that the invitation had reached him "at my Deep Cove Farm in Chester, Nova Scotia, where 8 of my grandchildren and I are getting acquainted with our latest crop of Shorthorn calves. Both the children and the calves are good to look at".

Mr. Eaton entertained extensively during the summer when he resided in Blandford. Many of his guests were celebrities; one such guest was Yuri Gagarin, the first man in space. He donated money for the doors of St. Bartholmus Church in Blandford. He had his ashes buried in Blandford (and Pugwash, Nova Scotia).

At his death in 1979, his estate was purchased by a group of businessmen from Germany.

== Legacy ==
- In the TV Series Theodore Tugboat, the buoy in Halifax Harbour is named Blandford after the community
