= Southern Nova Scotia =

Coordinates: 44°13′30.4″N 64°31′39.7″W

South Shore Southern Nova Scotia
- Economic Region
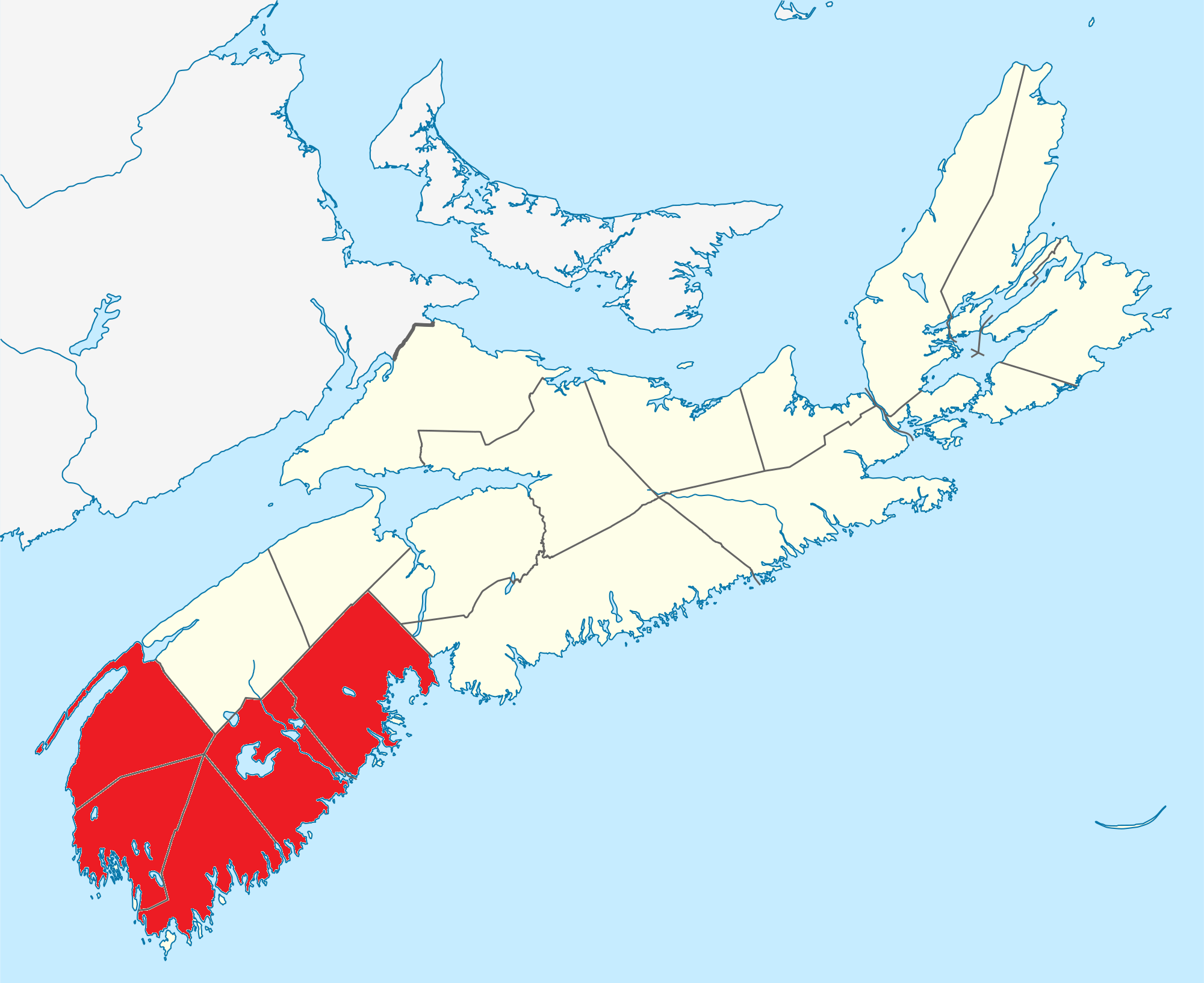
- The Southern Nova Scotia region as defined by Statistics Canada
- Interactive map of South Shore
- Country: Canada
- Province: Nova Scotia
- Counties: Lunenburg County; Queens County; Shelburne County; Yarmouth County; Digby County

Area
  - Land: 12,417.79 km^{2} (4,794.54 sq mi)

Population (2016)
  - Total: 113,185
  - Density: 9.1/km^{2} (24/sq mi)
  - Change 2011-16: ▼2.5%
- Time zone: UTC-4 (AST)
  - Summer (DST): UTC-3 (ADT)
- Area code: 902
- Dwellings: 61,948

Southern Nova Scotia or the South Shore is a region of Nova Scotia, Canada. The area has no formal identity and is variously defined by geographic, county and other political boundaries. Statistics Canada, defines Southern Nova Scotia as an economic region, composed of Lunenburg County, Queens County, Shelburne County, Yarmouth County, and Digby County. According to Statistics Canada, the region had the highest decrease of population in Canada from 2009 to 2010, with a population decrease of 10.2 residents per thousand. The region also has the second-highest median age in Canada at 47.1 years old.

== Politically defined ==
The South Shore is sometimes defined as part of the Halifax West, South Shore—St. Margaret's, and West Nova ridings at the federal level, or as the western rural part of the Halifax Regional Municipality, the Municipality of the District of Lunenburg, Queens County, and Shelburne County. It is generally considered to be a "swing" region that has changed political leanings in the recent past, and a key target for campaigning.

== History ==
The South Shore was one of the first areas of North America to be colonized by Europeans following the French settlement at Port-Royal in 1605. The region, without good agricultural land, was only sparsely inhabited by the Acadians, although several settlements were established in present-day Shelburne County and the LaHave River valley. When the British took control of the region in 1713, they initiated a program of importing colonists from continental Europe, known as the Foreign Protestants, mostly from Germany and Switzerland. To this day the South Shore retains many German place names and surnames as well as a distinct accent compared to the New England settlers' influence in the Annapolis Valley or the Highland Scots' influence in northeastern Nova Scotia and Cape Breton Island.

On December 19, 1906, the Halifax and Southwestern Railway opened between Halifax and Yarmouth, finishing a project that had begun in 1885, and bringing more reliable land transport to the region. Although the South Shore did not play a major role during the First World War, the area saw significant military activity during the Second World War and the ensuing Cold War, as Shelburne and Mill Cove became home to Royal Canadian Navy bases, and a Pinetree Line radar station was established by the Royal Canadian Air Force at Baccaro. In 1966, Canada's first satellite communications (SATCOM) earth station began operations at Mill Village. In the 1970s and 1980s, the Highway 103 arterial highway was built.

During the 20th century, the South Shore became the centre of Nova Scotia's fishing industry, as fishermen in small boats operated from numerous tiny villages dotted along the coast. The larger communities also had fish plants and port facilities for larger off-shore trawlers, which began to see increased use following the Second World War. During the 1960s and 1970s, the impact of offshore processing and increasingly larger trawlers was being felt in communities, and the way of life on the South Shore was altered. As in many parts of Nova Scotia, many South Shore fishing communities all but disappeared as residents moved to larger urban centres in search of new opportunities. The decline in the fishery coincided with growth in the service industry, and specifically tourism.

The culture and economy along the South Shore gradually changed as the scenic area became a more common tourist destination. As more tourists came to appreciate the beauty and culture of the region, coastal land prices rose, small businesses catering to the industry sprouted up, and a vibrant art community took root.

== Present day ==
Historical populations
Year	Pop.	±%
1991	126,812	—
1996	124,538	−1.8%
2001	121,935	−2.1%
2006	119,175	−2.3%
2011	116,080	−2.6%
2016	113,185	−2.5%

The South Shore is an important area for tourism in the province. It has a higher than average proportion of cottages, hotels, and tourist attractions, including Kejimkujik National Park. The provincial scenic travel way, the "Lighthouse Route" runs on Trunk 3 through most centres along the shore. The tourism industry is concentrated in the towns of Lunenburg, Chester, Mahone Bay, Liverpool, the five beaches surrounding Riverport, and the fishing community of Peggy's Cove. The largest community in the region is the town of Bridgewater, which is the commercial and industrial centre, although not a major tourism draw. Shelburne is second largest, with Liverpool and Lunenburg next. Lunenburg, a UNESCO World Heritage Site and the host to several major music festivals and arts events, plus the Bluenose II, is generally considered to be the cultural capital of the South Shore, with Bridgewater its industrial centre. However, that is over-generalized, as several key industries, notably shipping and aerospace and software, have a presence in Lunenburg that exceeds that in Bridgewater. Until 2009, the area was an important entry point for tourists travelling from New England, via a car ferry at Yarmouth. Two districts, Clare and Argyle, are notable for having proportionally large French-speaking populations. For the segment of tourism focused on Acadian history and culture, the major initiative is associated with the "Evangeline Trail" which extends through the Annapolis Valley and into the Southern Nova Scotia region as far as Yarmouth.

== Climate ==
The region is one of the southernmost areas of Canada, second only to Southern Ontario. Due to this as well as its proximity to the Atlantic Ocean, the region enjoys a climate which is distinctly mild by Canadian standards. The microclimate phenomenon occurs frequently, as many settled areas are located a considerable distance from the ocean itself. Overall, the South Shore experiences a humid continental climate with high precipitation year-round. Summers are warm (occasionally hot inland) with high levels of humidity, although the heat is moderate compared with Central Canada. Winters are cold and damp, and although snowfall occurs frequently, it is often mixed with rain and snow accumulation is moderate, particularly along the immediate coast. Mild days occur comparatively often in winter, usually as a result of low-pressure systems. Spring and autumn are extremely unpredictable, and the most precipitation falls by far within the months of April and May. For example, in 2011, rainfall occurred in Lunenburg County for 43 consecutive days during this period.
