= Upper Blandford, Nova Scotia =

Locality in Nova Scotia, Canada

Coordinates: 44°30′53.53″N 64°7′23.7″W

Upper Blandford in Nova Scotia

Upper Blandford is a locality in the Canadian province of Nova Scotia, located in the Chester Municipal District in Lunenburg County.
