= French Village, Nova Scotia =

Community in Nova Scotia, Canada

Coordinates: 44°37′54.9″N 63°54′50.5″W

French Village in Nova Scotia

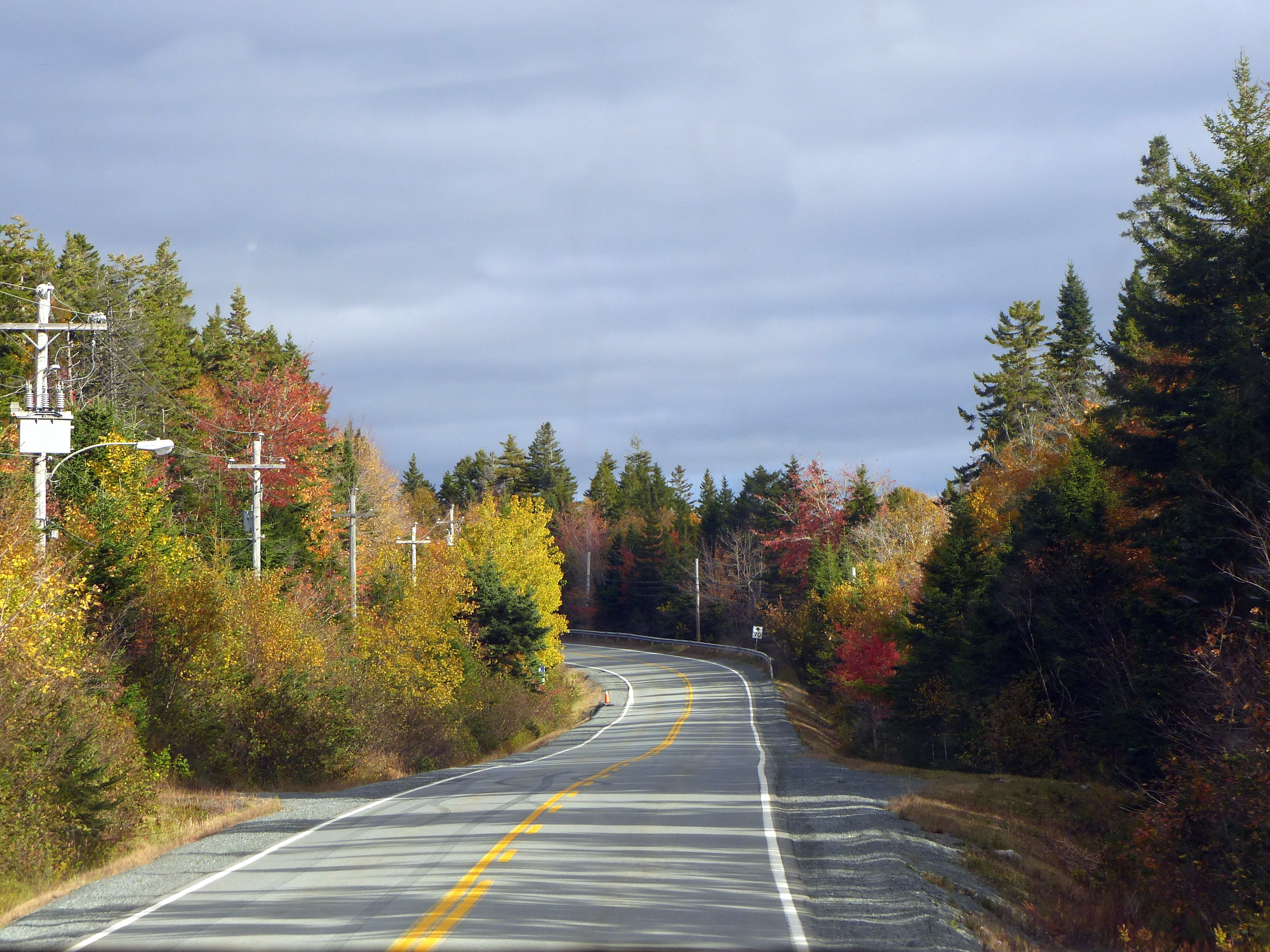
French Village

French Village is a rural community of the Halifax Regional Municipality in the Canadian province of Nova Scotia on Chebucto Peninsula. French Village initially included present day villages of Tantallon, Glen Haven and French Village. The French that migrated to the area were French speaking families from the Principality of Montbeliard (annexed by France 1793) and known as the "Foreign Protestants". They had come to Nova Scotia between 1750 and 1752 to settle Lunenburg, Nova Scotia. Contrary to belief, they were not Huguenots. The church in the community is St. Paul's Church. In 1901, the Halifax and Southwestern Railway was built through the area and the railway choose the name French Village for the station serving the three communities. The French Village station, actually located in Tantallon, has been preserved as a cafe beside the recreational trail that follows the old Halifax & Southwestern Railway roadbed.
