= New Harbour (Chester), Nova Scotia =

Locality in Nova Scotia, Canada

Coordinates: 44°28′22.77″N 64°5′24.43″W

New Harbour in Nova Scotia

New Harbour is a locality in the Canadian province of Nova Scotia, located in the Chester Municipal District in Lunenburg County.
