= Deep Cove, Nova Scotia =

Community in Nova Scotia, Canada

Coordinates: 44°31′35″N 64°6′14″W

Deep Cove in Nova Scotia

Deep Cove is a community in the Canadian province of Nova Scotia, located in the Chester Municipal District on the Aspotogan Peninsula on the Lighthouse Route (Nova Scotia Route 329).

In an address to the Empire Club of Canada (1950), Cyrus S. Eaton was introduced with the following:

Mr. Eaton also owns and operated a 3,000-acre farm near Chester, Nova Scotia, and an 870-acre farm at Northfield, Ohio, specializing in the raising of pure bred and registered Scotch Shorthorn cattle. I rather suspect that of all his undertakings Mr. Eaton has a very special interest in farming because our invitation to address this meeting reached him at his farm in Nova Scotia and, in his very welcome and very prompt reply accepting our invitation, he did say that the invitation had reached him "at my Deep Cove Farm in Chester, Nova Scotia, where 8 of my grandchildren and I are getting acquainted with our latest crop of Shorthorn calves. Both the children and the calves are good to look at".
