= New Harbour, Guysborough County, Nova Scotia =

Community in Nova Scotia, Canada

Coordinates: 45°10′1″N 61°27′58″W

New Harbour in Nova Scotia

New Harbour is a small community in the Canadian province of Nova Scotia, located in the Municipality of the District of Guysborough in Guysborough County.
