= Sheldrake Lake =

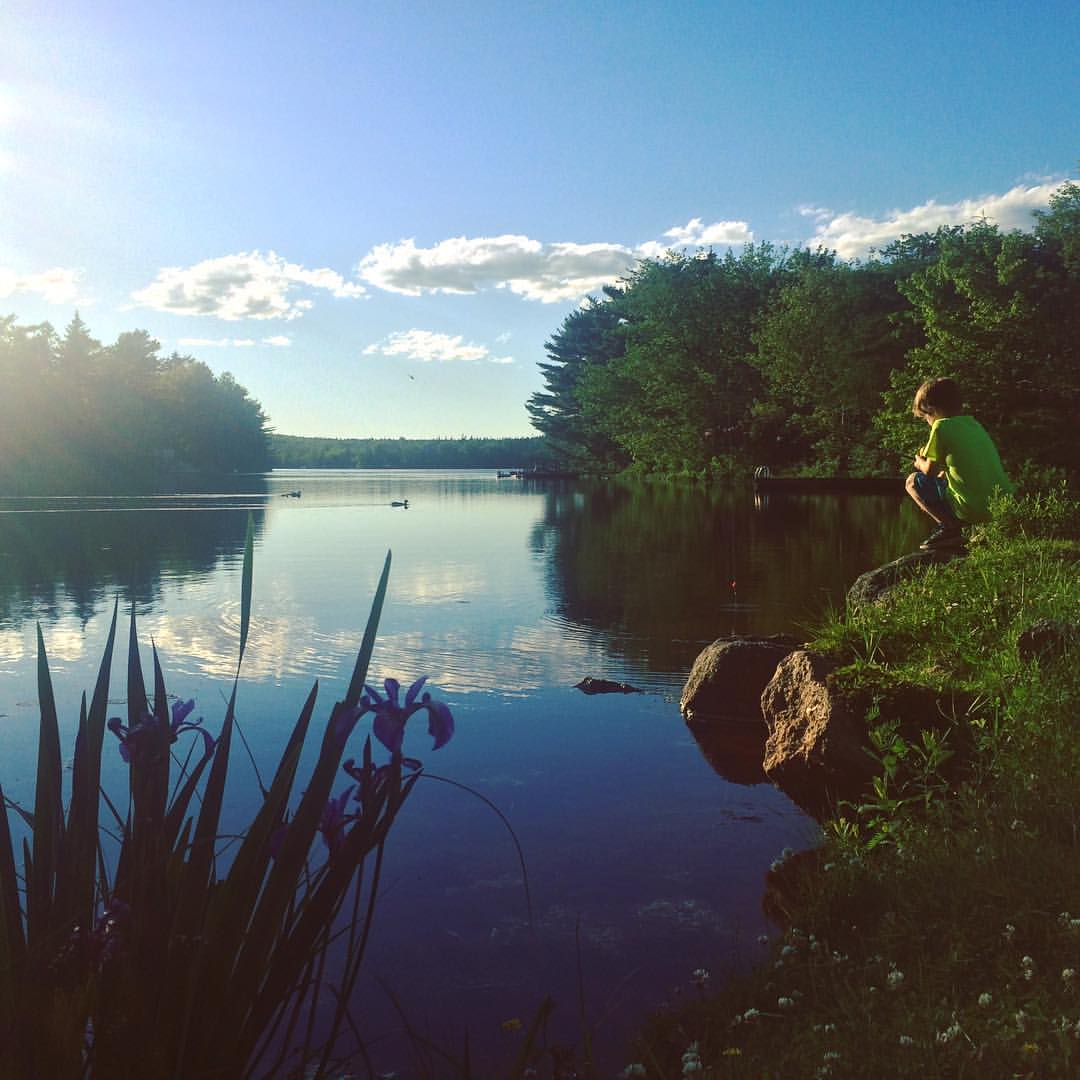

- Location within Nova Scotia
- Location: Nova Scotia, Canada
- Coordinates: 44.67621°N 63.79789°W
- Type: Lake
- Basin countries: Canada
- Surface area: 0.19 km^{2} (0.073 sq mi)
- Surface elevation: 76 m (249 ft)
- Settlements: Halifax, Nova Scotia

Sheldrake Lake is a lake in the Canadian province of Nova Scotia. Sheldrake Lake is 76 metres (249 ft) above sea level, and has a surface area of 0.19 square kilometres (0.073 mi^{2}). It drains to Five Island Lake. It stretches 0.6 kilometres (0.37 mi) in the north-south direction, and 0.5 kilometres (0.31 mi) kilometres in the east-west direction.

Otherwise, there are the following at Sheldrake Lake:

- Upper Sheldrake Lake
- Big Hubley Lake

Sheldrake Lake is surrounded primarily by forests. Around Sheldrake Lake, it is quite densely populated, with 108 inhabitants per square kilometre. The tract is part of the hemiboreal climate zone. The annual average temperature in the funnel is 6 °C. The warmest month is July, when the average temperature is 18 °C, and the coldest is January, with -8 °C. Average yearly average is 1 826 millimetres. The rainy month is December, with an average of 299 mm rainfall, and the driest is May, with 84 mm rainfall.
