= List of communities in Annapolis County, Nova Scotia =

List of communities in Annapolis County, Nova Scotia.

Communities are ordered by the highway upon which they are located, whose routes start after each terminus near the largest community.

== Trunk routes ==
- Trunk 1: Wilmot – Middleton – Brickton – Lawrencetown – Paradise – Bridgetown – Upper Granville – Belleisle – Granville Centre – Granville Ferry – Annapolis Royal – Upper Clements – Clementsport – Cornwallis Park – Deep Brook
- Trunk 8: Annapolis Royal – Lequille – Graywood – Milford – Maitland Bridge
- Trunk 10: Middleton – Nictaux Falls – Nictaux South – New Albany – Albany Cross – Springfield

== Collector roads ==
- Route 201: Centrelea – Tupperville – Round Hill – West Paradise – Moschelle – Carleton Corner
- Route 362: Middleton – Victoria Vale – Margaretsville – East Margaretsville

== Rural roads ==
- Albany, Nova Scotia
- Bloomington
- Clarence
- Clementsvale
- Delap's Cove
- Falkland Ridge
- Greenland
- Hampton
- Hastings
- Hillsburn
- Inglisville
- Karsdale
- Lake La Rose
- Litchfield
- Mount Hanley
- Outram
- Parker's Cove
- Perotte
- Phinney's Cove
- Port George
- Port Lorne
- Port Royal
- Port Wade
- Prince Albert
- South Farmington
- St. Croix Cove
- Torbrook
- West Dalhousie
- Victoria Beach
- Youngs Cove
- Waldeck
