= List of historic places in Annapolis County, Nova Scotia =

Annapolis County is a county in the Canadian province of Nova Scotia, located in the western part of the province. This list compiles historic places recognized by the Canadian Register of Historic Places within the county.

== List of historic places ==
Name	Address	Coordinates	Government recognition (CRHP №)	Wikidata ID	Image
Adams-Ritchie House	220 St. George Street; Annapolis Royal NS	44°44′41″N 65°31′09″W	Nova Scotia (6942)	Q117746635	More images
Albany Community Church	5939 Highway 10; Albany Cross NS	44°47′09″N 65°03′30″W	Albany Cross municipality (14025)	Q117747918	Upload Photo
14 Albert Street	14 Albert Street; Bridgetown NS	44°50′26″N 65°17′34″W	Bridgetown municipality (8088)	Q137216523	Upload Photo
Annapolis County Court House	377 St. George Street; Annapolis Royal NS	44°44′30″N 65°30′59″W	Federal (3997), Nova Scotia (2453)	Q23015908	More images
Annapolis Royal Historic District	St George Street; Annapolis Royal NS	44°44′31″N 65°30′49″W	Federal (16702)	Q59341098	More images
Captain James Anthony House	1625 Granville Road; Port Wade NS	44°40′40″N 65°42′36″W	Port Wade municipality (14026)	Q117745115	Upload Photo
Armoury	150 Commercial Street; Middleton NS	44°56′47″N 65°04′14″W	Federal (9771)	Q117749350	Upload Photo
Bailey House	150 St. George Street; Annapolis Royal NS	44°44′48″N 65°31′06″W	Nova Scotia (2911), Annapolis Royal municipality (2815)	Q120143556	More images
Bishop-Wentzell House	232 St. Anthony Street; Annapolis Royal NS	44°44′38″N 65°31′03″W	Annapolis Royal municipality (11879)	Q117749415	Upload Photo
Black Hole Powder Magazine	Fort Anne NHS; Annapolis Royal NS	44°44′36″N 65°30′59″W	Federal (10521)	Q105105842	More images
Bonnett House	158 St. George Street; Annapolis Royal NS	44°44′47″N 65°31′07″W	Annapolis Royal municipality (6944)	Q117749483	More images
Solomon Bowlby House	2295 Highway no. 1 Upper Clements NS	44°41′18″N 65°35′59″W	Upper Clements municipality (13941)	Q117749505	Upload Photo
Building 2	CFB Cornwallis; Cornwallis NS	44°39′05″N 65°37′52″W	Federal (11236)	Q137273700	Upload Photo
Building 3	CFB Cornwallis; Cornwallis NS	44°39′05″N 65°37′52″W	Federal (11223)	Q137273759	Upload Photo
Building 10	CFB Cornwallis; Cornwallis NS	44°39′05″N 65°37′52″W	Federal (11114)	Q137273815	More images
Building 30	CFB Cornwallis; Cornwallis NS	44°39′05″N 65°37′52″W	Federal (11041)	Q137273824	Upload Photo
Caleb House	10221 Highway 1 Paradise NS	44°52′08″N 65°13′02″W	Paradise municipality (14022)	Q137216533	Upload Photo
Centenary United Church	7401 No. 1 Highway; Upper Granville NS	44°48′43″N 65°21′54″W	Nova Scotia (6288)	Q137273830	Upload Photo
Charles Fort National Historic Site of Canada	Fort Anne NHS; Annapolis Royal NS	44°44′27″N 65°31′13″W	Federal (10493)	Q3077803	More images
9-11 Church Street	9-11 Church Street; Annapolis Royal NS	44°44′43″N 65°31′07″W	Annapolis Royal municipality (4195)	Q137169637	More images
21 Church Street	21 Church Street; Annapolis Royal NS	44°44′41″N 65°31′02″W	Annapolis Royal municipality (4494)	Q137216557	Upload Photo
45 Church Street	45 Church Street; Annapolis Royal NS	44°44′41″N 65°31′03″W	Annapolis Royal municipality (4196)	Q137216603	Upload Photo
Coach House	CFB Cornwallis; Cornwallis NS	44°39′19″N 65°38′00″W	Federal (11252)	Q137273891	Upload Photo
Collins-Merriam house	120 Ritchie Street; Annapolis Royal NS	44°44′30″N 65°30′32″W	Annapolis Royal municipality (7239)	Q137216652	Upload Photo
Corbitt House	204 St. Anthony Street; Annapolis Royal NS	44°44′41″N 65°31′01″W	Annapolis Royal municipality (12305)	Q137162842	Upload Photo
Cross-Therrio House	58 Drury Lane; Annapolis Royal NS	44°44′43″N 65°31′00″W	Annapolis Royal municipality (8056)	Q137216715	Upload Photo
de Gannes-Cosby House	477 St. George Street; Annapolis Royal NS	44°26′34″N 65°18′16″W	Annapolis Royal municipality (7122)	Q69899679	More images
Delap-Savary house	446-448 St. George Street; Annapolis Royal NS	44°44′30″N 65°30′48″W	Annapolis Royal municipality (6888)	Q137217021	Upload Photo
6 Drury Lane	6 Drury Lane; Annapolis Royal NS	44°44′45″N 65°31′08″W	Annapolis Royal municipality (8084)	Q137216787	Upload Photo
36 Drury Lane	36 Drury Lane; Annapolis Royal NS	44°44′44″N 65°31′03″W	Annapolis Royal municipality (8055)	Q137216876	Upload Photo
46 Drury Lane	46 Drury Lane; Annapolis Royal NS	44°44′44″N 65°31′02″W	Annapolis Royal municipality (8054)	Q137216990	Upload Photo
Emmanuel United Church	5439 Granville Road; Granville Ferry NS	44°45′12″N 65°31′13″W	Granville Ferry municipality (14124)	Q137217072	Upload Photo
Evergreen United Baptist Church	5247 Highway 201; West Paradise NS	44°51′03″N 65°14′01″W	West Paradise municipality (14141)	Q137217148	Upload Photo
Fort Anne	St. George Street; Annapolis Royal NS	44°44′28″N 65°31′08″W	Federal (2632)	Q3077761	More images
Goat Island Baptist Church	2340 Highway 1 Upper Clements NS	44°41′20″N 65°35′51″W	Nova Scotia (13458)	Q137217191	Upload Photo
Goldsmith-Kerr House	467-471 St George Street; Annapolis Royal NS	44°44′28″N 65°30′55″W	Annapolis Royal municipality (6627)	Q137217364	Upload Photo
Girvan Bank - Runciman House	478 St. George Street; Annapolis Royal NS	44°44′30″N 65°30′44″W	Nova Scotia (4946), Annapolis Royal municipality (5267)	Q137217499	Upload Photo
371 Granville Street East	371 Granville Street East; Bridgetown NS	44°50′30″N 65°17′06″W	Bridgetown municipality (8028)	Q137274094	Upload Photo
188 Granville Street West	188 Granville Street West; Bridgetown NS	44°50′33″N 65°17′50″W	Bridgetown municipality (8026)	Q137274106	Upload Photo
263 Granville Street West	263 Granville Street West; Bridgetown NS	44°50′30″N 65°17′30″W	Bridgetown municipality (8030)	Q137274115	Upload Photo
Captain Joseph Hall House	5287 Granville Road; Granville Ferry NS	44°44′52″N 65°31′34″W	Granville Ferry municipality (14161)	Q137274135	Upload Photo
Hampton Lighthouse	RR#2; Hampton NS	44°54′34″N 65°20′57″W	Nova Scotia (11637)	Q28376389	More images
Hardwick Block	302 St. George Street; Annapolis Royal NS	44°26′37″N 65°18′38″W	Annapolis Royal municipality (7290)	Q137217533	Upload Photo
Harris House	407 St. George Street; Annapolis Royal NS	44°44′30″N 65°30′55″W	Annapolis Royal municipality (6750)	Q137217573	Upload Photo
Harris-Baxter house	843 St. George Street; Annapolis Royal NS	44°26′28″N 65°18′00″W	Annapolis Royal municipality (7242)	Q137217653	Upload Photo
Hillsdale House	519 St. George Street; Annapolis Royal NS	44°44′26″N 65°30′40″W	Nova Scotia (3093), Annapolis Royal municipality (2818)	Q132178990	More images
James House	12 Queen Street; Bridgetown NS	44°50′28″N 65°17′28″W	Nova Scotia (2954)	Q136800199	Upload Photo
Journeay house	240-242 St. George Street; Annapolis Royal NS	44°44′39″N 65°31′10″W	Annapolis Royal municipality (4334)	Q137169649	More images
King House	222 St. Anthony Street; Annapolis Royal NS	44°44′39″N 65°31′03″W	Annapolis Royal municipality (12306)	Q137217683	Upload Photo
LeQuille Mill	50 Dugway Road; Lequille NS	44°43′37″N 65°29′35″W	Nova Scotia (3035)	Q137274145	Upload Photo
William Letteney House	5365 Granville Road; Granville Ferry NS	44°45′03″N 65°31′24″W	Granville Ferry municipality (14023)	Q137274159	Upload Photo
Lewis House	62 Chapel Street; Annapolis Royal NS	44°44′48″N 65°30′57″W	Annapolis Royal municipality (7244)	Q137274167	More images
Melanson Settlement National Historic Site of Canada	Lower Granville NS	44°43′09″N 65°35′46″W	Federal (9356)	Q3591516	More images
Merry House	1087 Highway 8 Maitland Bridge NS	44°27′33″N 65°13′55″W	Maitland Bridge municipality (14027)	Q136528469	Upload Photo
Milford United Baptist Church	5616 Highway 8 Milford NS	44°35′02″N 65°24′25″W	Milford municipality (14063)	Q137274234	Upload Photo
Morse Cemetery	No. 201 Highway; Carleton Corner NS	44°49′53″N 65°16′56″W	Nova Scotia (6848)	Q137162462	Upload Photo
Morse-Magwood House	318 Granville Street East; Bridgetown NS	44°50′28″N 65°17′18″W	Nova Scotia (6943)	Q137274269	Upload Photo
Mount Hanley School Section Number 10	2130 Mount Hanley Road; Mount Hanley NS	44°57′59″N 65°10′26″W	Nova Scotia (6947)	Q14875729	More images
Murray House	162-164 St. George Street; Annapolis Royal NS	44°44′47″N 65°31′07″W	Annapolis Royal municipality (4199)	Q137217699	Upload Photo
North Hills Museum	5065 Granville Road; Granville Ferry NS	44°44′35″N 65°32′13″W	Nova Scotia (12565)	Q69834178	More images
Officers' Quarters	Fort Anne NHS; Annapolis Royal NS	44°44′28″N 65°31′08″W	Federal (2976)	Q117741497	More images
Old Holy Trinity Church	49 Main Street; Lower Middleton NS	44°56′02″N 65°05′12″W	Nova Scotia (3805)	Q137274315	Upload Photo
Old St. Alban's Church	150 Old Trunk 8 Lequille NS	44°43′19″N 65°29′20″W	Lequille municipality (14126)	Q137274391	Upload Photo
Paradise School	10307 Highway 1 Paradise NS	44°52′10″N 65°12′39″W	Paradise municipality (14024)	Q137274396	Upload Photo
17 Park Street	17 Park Street; Bridgetown NS	44°50′19″N 65°17′16″W	Bridgetown municipality (8085)	Q137274398	Upload Photo
Parker Farm	6568 No. 1 Highway; Belleisle NS	44°48′10″N 65°24′43″W	Nova Scotia (6484)	Q137274417	Upload Photo
Parker / Hawboldt House	6601 Highway 1 Belleisle NS	44°48′31″N 65°24′53″W	Belleisle municipality (14021)	Q137274421	Upload Photo
Port-Royal National Historic Site	53 Historic Ln; Granville Ferry NS	44°42′44″N 65°36′36″W	Federal (7658, (1254)	Q3125393	More images
260 Prince Albert Road	260 Prince Albert Road; Annapolis Royal NS	44°44′33″N 65°30′55″W	Annapolis Royal municipality (5239)	Q137217709	Upload Photo
Queen Anne Inn	494 St. George Street; Annapolis Royal NS	44°44′28″N 65°30′42″W	Nova Scotia (3095), Annapolis Royal municipality (2817)	Q105945315	More images
Riley-Burnham House	390 St. George Street; Annapolis Royal NS	44°44′32″N 65°30′56″W	Annapolis Royal municipality (6889)	Q137217790	Upload Photo
Riordan-Francis house	18 St. James Street; Annapolis Royal NS	44°44′40″N 65°31′05″W	Annapolis Royal municipality (6918)	Q137217795	Upload Photo
Ritchie-Cummings House	226 St. Anthony Street; Annapolis Royal NS	44°44′38″N 65°31′03″W	Annapolis Royal municipality (11899)	Q137217855	Upload Photo
126 Ritchie Street	126 Ritchie Street; Annapolis Royal NS	44°44′30″N 65°30′31″W	Annapolis Royal municipality (2826)	Q137217868	Upload Photo
138 Ritchie Street	138 Ritchie Street; Annapolis Royal NS	44°44′30″N 65°30′29″W	Annapolis Royal municipality (4198)	Q137217909	Upload Photo
Robertson-McNamara House	154 St. George Street; Annapolis Royal NS	44°44′48″N 65°31′07″W	Annapolis Royal municipality (10838)	Q137217964	Upload Photo
Robinson-Kelsall House	98 Victoria Street; Annapolis Royal NS	44°44′35″N 65°30′58″W	Annapolis Royal municipality (11964)	Q137217979	Upload Photo
Rothsay Masonic Temple	48 Queen Street; Bridgetown NS	44°50′21″N 65°17′28″W	Nova Scotia (7927)	Q137290157	Upload Photo
Royal Bank of Canada Building	248 St. George Street; Annapolis Royal NS	44°44′39″N 65°31′11″W	Annapolis Royal municipality (7007)	Q137218004	Upload Photo
209/211/213 St. Anthony Street	209/211/213 St. Anthony Street; Annapolis Royal NS	44°44′39″N 65°31′03″W	Annapolis Royal municipality (11875)	Q137218026	Upload Photo
Saint Edward's Anglican Church	34 Old Post Road; Clementsport NS	44°39′49″N 65°36′18″W	Nova Scotia (7261)	Q137290181	Upload Photo
112-114 St. George Street	112-114 St. George Street; Annapolis Royal NS	44°44′52″N 65°31′04″W	Annapolis Royal municipality (4179)	Q137218136	Upload Photo
122 St. George Street	122 St. George Street; Annapolis Royal NS	44°44′51″N 65°31′05″W	Annapolis Royal municipality (4197)	Q137218152	Upload Photo
136-138 St. George Street	136-138 St. George Street; Annapolis Royal NS	44°44′50″N 65°31′06″W	Annapolis Royal municipality (4924)	Q120682534	Upload Photo
170 St. George Street	170 George Street; Annapolis Royal NS	44°44′46″N 65°31′07″W	Annapolis Royal municipality (5074)	Q137169936	More images
174 St. George Street	174 St. George Street; Annapolis Royal NS	44°44′46″N 65°31′07″W	Annapolis Royal municipality (7123)	Q137169950	More images
176 St. George Street	176 St. George Street; Annapolis Royal NS	44°44′46″N 65°31′08″W	Annapolis Royal municipality (5159)	Q137169960	More images
207-209 St. George Street	207-209 St. George Street; Annapolis Royal NS	44°44′43″N 65°31′10″W	Annapolis Royal municipality (4180)	Q38280594	More images
222-224 St. George Street	222-224 St. George Street; Annapolis Royal NS	44°44′42″N 65°31′09″W	Annapolis Royal municipality (2790)	Q117746635	More images
239 St. George Street	239 St. George Street; Annapolis Royal NS	44°44′40″N 65°31′11″W	Annapolis Royal municipality (5310)	Q137170001	More images
253 St. George Street	253 St. George Street; Annapolis Royal NS	44°44′39″N 65°31′12″W	Annapolis Royal municipality (2460)	Q137170020	More images
262-264 St. George Street	262-264 St. George Street; Annapolis Royal NS	44°44′37″N 65°31′10″W	Annapolis Royal municipality (4200)	Q137170100	More images
285 St. George Street	285 St. George Street; Annapolis Royal NS	44°44′35″N 65°31′11″W	Annapolis Royal municipality (2791)	Q137218483	More images
308-310 St. George Street	308-310 St. George Street; Annapolis Royal NS	44°44′35″N 65°31′06″W	Annapolis Royal municipality (4513)	Q137219126	Upload Photo
314 St. George Street	314 St. George Street; Annapolis Royal NS	44°44′34″N 65°31′06″W	Annapolis Royal municipality (4201)	Q137219185	Upload Photo
364-366 St. George Street	364-366 St. George Street; Annapolis Royal NS	44°44′33″N 65°30′59″W	Annapolis Royal municipality (2816)	Q137256667	Upload Photo
372-374 St. George Street	372-374 St. George Street; Annapolis Royal NS	44°44′33″N 65°30′59″W	Annapolis Royal municipality (5269)	Q137256909	Upload Photo
378-380 St. George Street	378-380 St. George Street; Annapolis Royal NS	44°44′32″N 65°30′57″W	Annapolis Royal municipality (4817)	Q137257257	Upload Photo
393 St. George Street	393 St. George Street; Annapolis Royal NS	44°44′30″N 65°30′57″W	Annapolis Royal municipality (4202)	Q137257491	Upload Photo
401 St. George Street	401 St. George Street; Annapolis Royal NS	44°44′30″N 65°30′55″W	Annapolis Royal municipality (5075)	Q137257756	Upload Photo
430-432 St. George Street	430-432 St. George Street; Annapolis Royal NS	44°44′31″N 65°30′50″W	Annapolis Royal municipality (3033)	Q137258210	Upload Photo
454 St. George Street	454 St. George Street; Annapolis Royal NS	44°44′30″N 65°30′47″W	Annapolis Royal municipality (7243)	Q137258218	Upload Photo
499 St. George Street	499 St. George Street; Annapolis Royal NS	44°44′26″N 65°30′42″W	Annapolis Royal municipality (14765)	Q137258224	Upload Photo
518 St. George Street	518 St. George Street; Annapolis Royal NS	44°44′28″N 65°30′39″W	Annapolis Royal municipality (7238)	Q137258232	Upload Photo
524 St. George Street	524 St. George Street; Annapolis Royal NS	44°44′28″N 65°30′37″W	Annapolis Royal municipality (2819)	Q137258241	Upload Photo
548 St. George Street	548 St. George Street; Annapolis Royal NS	44°44′27″N 65°30′35″W	Annapolis Royal municipality (4781)	Q137258267	Upload Photo
558 St. George Street	558 St. George Street; Annapolis Royal NS	44°44′27″N 65°30′33″W	Annapolis Royal municipality (3029)	Q137258279	Upload Photo
613 St. George Street	613 St. George Street; Annapolis Royal NS	44°44′23″N 65°30′27″W	Annapolis Royal municipality (4773)	Q137258287	Upload Photo
619 St. George Street	619 St. George Street; Annapolis Royal NS	44°44′23″N 65°30′27″W	Annapolis Royal municipality (4203)	Q137258421	Upload Photo
629 St. George Street	629 St. George Street; Annapolis Royal NS	44°44′23″N 65°30′25″W	Annapolis Royal municipality (2820)	Q137258438	Upload Photo
643 St. George Street	643 St. George Street; Annapolis Royal NS	44°44′22″N 65°30′23″W	Annapolis Royal municipality (2821)	Q137258490	Upload Photo
652 St. George Street	652 St. George Street; Annapolis Royal NS	44°44′24″N 65°30′21″W	Annapolis Royal municipality (2822)	Q137258498	Upload Photo
664-666 St. George Street	664-666 St. George Street; Annapolis Royal NS	44°44′23″N 65°30′20″W	Annapolis Royal municipality (2823)	Q137258507	Upload Photo
672 St. George Street	672 St. George Street; Annapolis Royal NS	44°44′22″N 65°30′19″W	Annapolis Royal municipality (4510)	Q137258536	Upload Photo
680 St. George Street	680 St. George Street; Annapolis Royal NS	44°44′21″N 65°30′18″W	Annapolis Royal municipality (4952)	Q137258561	Upload Photo
700 St. George Street	700 St. George Street; Annapolis Royal NS	44°44′21″N 65°30′15″W	Annapolis Royal municipality (5305)	Q137258591	Upload Photo
703-705 St. George Street	703-705 St. George Street; Annapolis Royal NS	44°44′19″N 65°30′16″W	Annapolis Royal municipality (5258)	Q137258639	Upload Photo
712 St. George Street	712 St. George Street; Annapolis Royal NS	44°44′20″N 65°30′13″W	Annapolis Royal municipality (6805)	Q137258664	Upload Photo
780 St. George Street	780 St. George Street; Annapolis Royal NS	44°44′17″N 65°30′06″W	Annapolis Royal municipality (2824)	Q137258711	Upload Photo
789-791 St. George Street	789-791 St. George Street; Annapolis Royal NS	44°44′15″N 65°30′07″W	Annapolis Royal municipality (2825)	Q137258748	Upload Photo
800 St. George Street	800 St. George Street; Annapolis Royal NS	44°44′16″N 65°30′04″W	Annapolis Royal municipality (5266)	Q137258799	Upload Photo
808 St. George Street	808 St. George Street; Annapolis Royal NS	44°44′15″N 65°30′03″W	Annapolis Royal municipality (7240)	Q137258801	Upload Photo
832 St. George Street	832 St. George Street; Annapolis Royal NS	44°44′12″N 65°30′01″W	Annapolis Royal municipality (6890)	Q137258806	Upload Photo
24 St. James Street	24 St. James Street; Annapolis Royal NS	44°44′41″N 65°31′06″W	Annapolis Royal municipality (8091)	Q137258822	Upload Photo
37 St. James Street	37 St. James Street; Annapolis Royal NS	44°44′40″N 65°31′06″W	Annapolis Royal municipality (8319)	Q137258831	Upload Photo
43 St. James Street	43 St. James Street; Annapolis Royal NS	44°44′39″N 65°31′07″W	Annapolis Royal municipality (8162)	Q137258848	Upload Photo
St. John's Anglican Church	694 Highway 201; Moschelle NS	44°45′08″N 65°28′08″W	Moschelle municipality (14066)	Q137290203	Upload Photo
Saint Luke's Anglican Church	340 St. George Street; Annapolis Royal NS	44°44′34″N 65°31′02″W	Nova Scotia (7717)	Q120703802	More images
St. Mark's Anglican Church	2553 Perotte Road; Perotte NS	44°41′45″N 65°24′24″W	Perotte municipality (14083)	Q137290221	Upload Photo
Schafner Point Lighthouse	3400 Granville Rd; Granville Ferry NS	44°42′36″N 65°37′09″W	Federal (20733)	Q28376380	More images
Shaw-McClafferty House	210 St. Anthony Street; Annapolis Royal NS	44°44′40″N 65°31′02″W	Annapolis Royal municipality (12304)	Q137258873	Upload Photo
Sinclair Inn	230 St. George Street; Annapolis Royal NS	44°44′41″N 65°31′09″W	Federal (12849), Nova Scotia (2897), Annapolis Royal municipality (4951)	Q22978876	More images
Captain Snow House	1759 Granville Road; Port Wade NS	44°40′56″N 65°42′17″W	Port Wade municipality (14125)	Q137290379	Upload Photo
South Powder Magazine	Fort Anne NHS; Annapolis Royal NS	44°44′28″N 65°31′08″W	Federal (2980)	Q104908110	More images
Tower	Margaretsville NS	45°02′58″N 65°03′54″W	Federal (10084)		Upload Photo
Tupperville School Museum	2663 Highway 201; Tupperville NS	44°47′53″N 65°22′04″W	Tupperville municipality (14041)	Q136913432	Upload Photo
Victoria Beach Lighthouse	Victoria Beach Road; Victoria Beach NS	44°40′34″N 65°45′13″W	Federal (20916)	Q28376385	More images
8 Victoria Street	8 Victoria Street; Annapolis Royal NS	44°44′38″N 65°31′09″W	Annapolis Royal municipality (5162)	Q137170148	More images
Bread and Roses Country Inn	80-82 Victoria Street; Annapolis Royal NS	44°44′36″N 65°30′59″W	Nova Scotia (6541), Annapolis Royal municipality (2807)	Q137258879	Upload Photo
83 Victoria Street	83 Victoria Street; Annapolis Royal NS	44°44′34″N 65°31′00″W	Annapolis Royal municipality (5259)	Q137258971	Upload Photo
89 Victoria Street	89 Victoria Street; Annapolis Royal NS	44°44′34″N 65°30′59″W	Annapolis Royal municipality (2827)	Q137258986	Upload Photo
95 Victoria Street	95 Victoria Street; Annapolis Royal NS	44°44′34″N 65°30′58″W	Annapolis Royal municipality (2828)	Q137259012	Upload Photo
101 Victoria Street	101 Victoria Street; Annapolis Royal NS	44°44′34″N 65°30′58″W	Annapolis Royal municipality (12036)	Q137259029	Upload Photo
Canadian Pacific Railway Station	151 Victoria Street; Annapolis Royal NS	44°44′32″N 65°30′51″W	Federal (6726), Annapolis Royal municipality (4120)	Q3095640	More images
20 Washington Street	20 Washington Street; Bridgetown NS	44°30′09″N 65°10′20″W	Bridgetown municipality (8027)	Q137290542	Upload Photo
18 Water Street	18 Water Street; Bridgetown NS	44°50′24″N 65°17′33″W	Bridgetown municipality (8065)	Q137290623	Upload Photo
19 Water Street	19 Water Street; Bridgetown NS	44°30′09″N 65°10′24″W	Bridgetown municipality (8029)	Q137290644	Upload Photo
Whitman-Riley House	95 Victoria Street; Annapolis Royal NS	44°44′35″N 65°30′59″W	Annapolis Royal municipality (12303)	Q137162891	Upload Photo
The Willows	441 St. George Street; Annapolis Royal NS	44°26′34″N 65°18′18″W	Annapolis Royal municipality (6962)	Q137170198	More images

== See also ==
- List of historic places in Nova Scotia
- List of National Historic Sites of Canada in Nova Scotia
- Heritage Property Act (Nova Scotia)
