= Nova Scotia Highway 101 =

Highway in Nova Scotia

Highway 101
- Harvest Highway
- Highway 101 highlighted in red

Route information
- Maintained by Nova Scotia Department of Public Works
- Length: 308.5 km (191.7 mi)
- Existed: 1962–present

Major junctions
- East end: Hwy 102 / Trunk 1 in Bedford
- Trunk 14 near Windsor; Trunk 8 near Annapolis Royal
- West end: Trunk 3 in Yarmouth

Location
- Country: Canada
- Province: Nova Scotia

Highway system
- Provincial highways in Nova Scotia; 100-series
← Trunk 33	→ Hwy 102

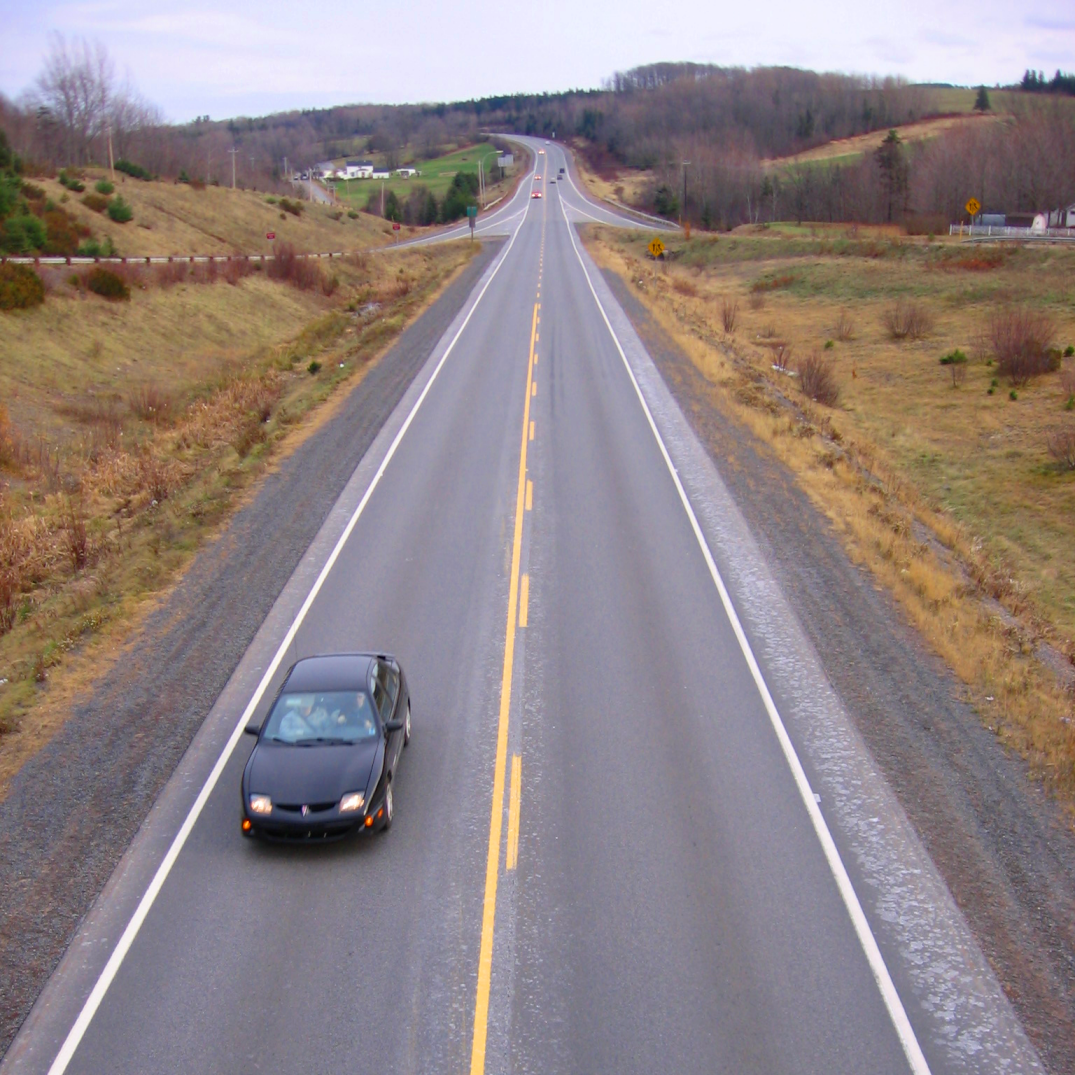
View of Highway 101 as it passes outside Kentville, Nova Scotia.

Highway 101 is an east–west 100-series highway in Nova Scotia that runs from Bedford to Yarmouth.

The highway follows a 310 km (190 mi) route along the southern coast of the Bay of Fundy through the Annapolis Valley, the largest agricultural district in the province. Between its western terminus at Yarmouth to Weymouth, the highway is 2-lane controlled access. Between Weymouth and Digby, the highway reverts to a 2-lane local road. From Digby to Grand Pre, the highway is 2-lane controlled access. From the Gaspereau River crossing near Grand Pre to 3 km west of Exit 6 (Falmouth) the highway is a 4-lane freeway. Heading east the highway is 2-lane controlled access until Exit 5 (Trunk 14). From Three Mile Plains to its eastern terminus at Bedford, the highway is a 4-lane freeway. Some of the 2-lane controlled access sections of the highway are 3 or 4 lanes, with the addition of passing lanes. One section of the 4-lane freeway near Hantsport is a short 5-lane (3 lanes westbound) section for about 2 km due to previous road configuration for a passing lane due to a steep hill. Similar to Highway 103, kilometre markers increase run west-to-east, increasing from Yarmouth to Bedford; however, exit numbers run east-to-west, increasing from Bedford to Yarmouth.

The provincial government named the highway the Harvest Highway on 7 December 2008 to recognize the important contributions of farmers in Nova Scotia.

== History ==
Background

In the late 1950s, the demand for limited access arterials in Nova Scotia became evident due to congestion on trunk routes such as Highway 1, which led to the development of the 100-series highway system.

Construction

Highway 101 was developed in non-contiguous sections with the first parts, between Bedford and Upper Sackville, and between Windsor and Avonport, built in the early 1960s, before the 100-series highways were named. Due to the lack of numerical designation, these short sections were generally referred to as bypasses. In the late 1960s, sections between Mount Uniacke and Windsor, as well as between Avonport and Coldbrook began development and opened in 1970. Further demand saw the construction of segments through the Annapolis Valley, Digby and Yarmouth counties in the 1970s–1990s. The highway was built to provide a modern limited-access route between Halifax and Yarmouth, and the many towns and villages in the corridor.

Twinning

The first section of Highway 101 to be twinned was between Bedford and Lower Sackville, which was completed in the late 1970s. By the early 1990s, the highway was divided from Bedford to Mount Uniacke, and in 2004 twinning to Windsor was completed. The posted speed limit on most twinned segments is 110 km/h. As of 2023, Highway 101 is twinned from Bedford to Avonport, with the exception of the Windsor Causeway which is still under construction. Nearly all other sections are 2 lane, undivided highways with occasional passing lanes and a posted speed limit of 100 km/h.

Future

Highway twinning is expected to Coldbrook within the foreseeable future, as well as most new developments seeing design which accommodates future twinning.

There is an exit currently being built for Cambridge, which will provide access to Trunk 1 in the current 15-kilometre gap between exits 14 and 15. This interchange will be a diamond configuration with roundabouts and an overpass to accommodate future twinning of Highway 101. A controlled-access collector road is proposed to connect the interchange with Trunk 1 to the South at a roundabout, Annapolis Valley First Nation at the interchange, and Brooklyn Street to the North.

== Exit list ==
County	Location	km	mi	Exit	Destinations	Notes
Halifax	Bedford	0.0– 1.1	0.0– 0.68		Trunk 1 east (Bedford Highway) to Trunk 2 / Trunk 7 – Bedford, Dartmouth	Hwy 101 eastern terminus; roadway continues as Trunk 1
Halifax	Bedford	0.0– 1.1	0.0– 0.68	1G/H	Hwy 102 – Halifax International Airport, Truro, Halifax	Signed as exits 1G (south) and 1H (north); exits 4A/B on Hwy 102
Halifax	Bedford	0.0– 1.1	0.0– 0.68	1F	Bedford Bypass (Trunk 33 east) to Trunk 7 east – Dartmouth	Eastbound exit, westbound entrance
Halifax	Lower Sackville	0.0– 1.1	0.0– 0.68	1K	Trunk 1 west (Cobequid Road) – Lower Sackville	Westbound exit, eastbound entrance
Halifax	Lower Sackville	4.4	2.7	2	Route 354 (Beaver Bank Road) – Lower Sackville, Middle Sackville	Future location of new collector road (Larry Uteck Blvd Extension) to Hammonds Plains Road (Route 213)
Halifax	Middle Sackville	7.2	4.5	2A	To Trunk 1 (Margeson Drive) – Upper Sackville, Middle Sackville, Lower Sackville	Interchange opened in 2011
Hants		16.2	10.1	3	Trunk 1 – Mount Uniacke, Upper Sackville	
Hants	St. Croix	38.1	23.7	4	Trunk 1 to Route 215 – St. Croix, Newport, Ellershouse	
Hants		44.9	27.9	5	Trunk 14 to Trunk 1 / Route 215 – Windsor, Chester, Three Mile Plains, Rawdon	
Hants	Windsor	47.3	29.4	5A	Wentworth Road	
Hants	Windsor	49.4	30.7	6	To Trunk 1 – Windsor Downtown	
Hants	Falmouth	51.1	31.8	7	To Trunk 1 – Falmouth	
Hants	Hantsport	57.3	35.6	8	To Trunk 1 – Hantsport, Mount Denson	
Kings	Glooscap First Nation	61.2	38.0	8A	To Trunk 1 (Ben Jackson Road) – Hantsport, Lockhartville	Opened in 2009
Kings	Avonport	65.6	40.8	9	Trunk 1 east – Avonport, West Brooklyn	East end of Trunk 1 concurrency
Kings	Grand Pré	68.2	42.4	10	Trunk 1 west – Grand Pré, Hortonville, Wolfville	West end of Trunk 1 concurrency; westbound access to Wolfville
Kings	Greenwich	77.3	48.0	11	To Trunk 1 / Route 358 – Greenwich, Port Williams, Canning, Wolfville	Eastbound access to Wolfville
Kings	New Minas	80.3	49.9	11A	To Trunk 1 (Granite Drive) – New Minas	Opened December, 2018
Kings	New Minas	83.5	51.9	12	To Trunk 1 – New Minas, Kentville	
Kings	North Alton	87.6	54.4	13	Trunk 12 – Kentville, North Alton, South Alton, New Ross	Westbound access to Kentville
Kings	Coldbrook	91.3	56.7	14	Trunk 1 – Coldbrook, Cambridge, Waterville, Kentville	Eastbound access to Kentville
Kings	Cambridge	99.6	61.9	14A	To Trunk 1 (Cambridge Connector) – Cambridge, Waterville	New interchange under construction
Kings	Berwick	105.9	65.8	15	Route 360 – Berwick, Harbourville, Cambridge	
Kings		114.2	71.0	16	Victoria Harbour Road – Aylesford, Auburn, Morden	
Kings	Kingston	123.5	76.7	17E	Bishop Mountain Road – Kingston, Greenwood	Westbound exit, eastbound entrance
Kings	Kingston	125.2	77.8	17W	Marshall Road – Kingston, Greenwood	Eastbound exit, westbound entrance
Annapolis	Middleton	133.2	82.8	18A	To Trunk 1 / Trunk 10 / Route 362 – Middleton, Nictaux Falls, Margaretsville	Westbound exit, eastbound entrance; westbound access to Trunk 10 / Route 362
Annapolis	Middleton	136.5	84.8	18	To Trunk 1 / Trunk 10 / Route 362 – Middleton, Brickton, Mount Hanley, Nictaux Falls, Margaretsville	Eastbound access to Trunk 10 / Route 362
Annapolis		145.2	90.2	19	To Trunk 1 – Lawrencetown, Clarence, Port Lorne	
Annapolis	Bridgetown	156.3	97.1	20	Trunk 1 (Evangeline Trail) – Bridgetown, Upper Granville, Paradise	
Annapolis	Bridgetown	156.7	97.4	Crosses the Annapolis River		
Annapolis		161.0	100.0	21	To Route 201 – Bridgetown, Centrelea, Tupperville	
Annapolis		182.2	113.2	22	Trunk 8 north to Trunk 1 / Route 201 – Lequille, Granville Ferry, Annapolis Royal	
Annapolis		196.2	121.9	23A	Cornwallis, Clementsport, Clemenstvale	
Annapolis		200.6– 201.9	124.6– 125.5	23	Trunk 1 east – Deep Brook, Cornwallis, Clementsport	East end of Trunk 1 concurrency
Annapolis–Digby county boundary		202.6	125.9	Crosses the Bear River		
Digby		203.2	126.3	24	Trunk 1 west – Smith's Cove, Bear River	West end of Trunk 1 concurrency
Digby	Joggin Bridge	207.4	128.9	25	Trunk 1 east – Bear River, Smith's Cove, Lansdowne	East end of Trunk 1 concurrency
Digby	Joggin Bridge	207.8	129.1	Joggin Bridge crosses The Joggins/Big Joggins (Annapolis Basin)		
Digby	Digby	210.2	130.6	26	Route 303 north to Route 217 – Digby, Saint John Ferry	
Digby		233.9	145.3	27	Trunk 1 west to Route 340 – Weymouth, Weymouth Falls, Weymouth North, Fort Point	At-grade; west end of Trunk 1 concurrency
Digby	New Edinburgh	236.7	147.1	Crosses the Sissiboo River		
Digby	St. Bernard	240.4	149.4	28	Trunk 1 to Route 340 – Weymouth, St. Bernard, Belliveaus Cove, Grosses Coques, Church Point	
Digby		255.3	158.6	29	To Trunk 1 – Concession, Comeauville, Church Point, Little Brook, Saulnierville	
Digby		270.7	168.2	31	To Trunk 1 – Meteghan, St. Alphonse de Clare, Mavillette, Meteghan River, Saulnierville	
Digby	Salmon River	283.1	175.9	32	To Trunk 1 – Salmon River, Mavillette, Hectanooga	
Yarmouth		291.4	181.1	33	To Trunk 1 – Port Maitland, Darling's Lake, Beaver River	
Yarmouth	Hebron	301.4	187.3	34	Route 340 to Trunk 1 – South Ohio, Hebron, Yarmouth	
Yarmouth	Yarmouth	308.5	191.7		Trunk 3 (Starrs Road) to Hwy 103 / Trunk 1 – Arcadia, Yarmouth	At-grade; Hwy 101 western terminus
1.000 mi = 1.609 km; 1.000 km = 0.621 mi: Concurrency terminus; Incomplete access; Route transition; Unopened
