= Annapolis River =

Annapolis River Rivière du Dauphin
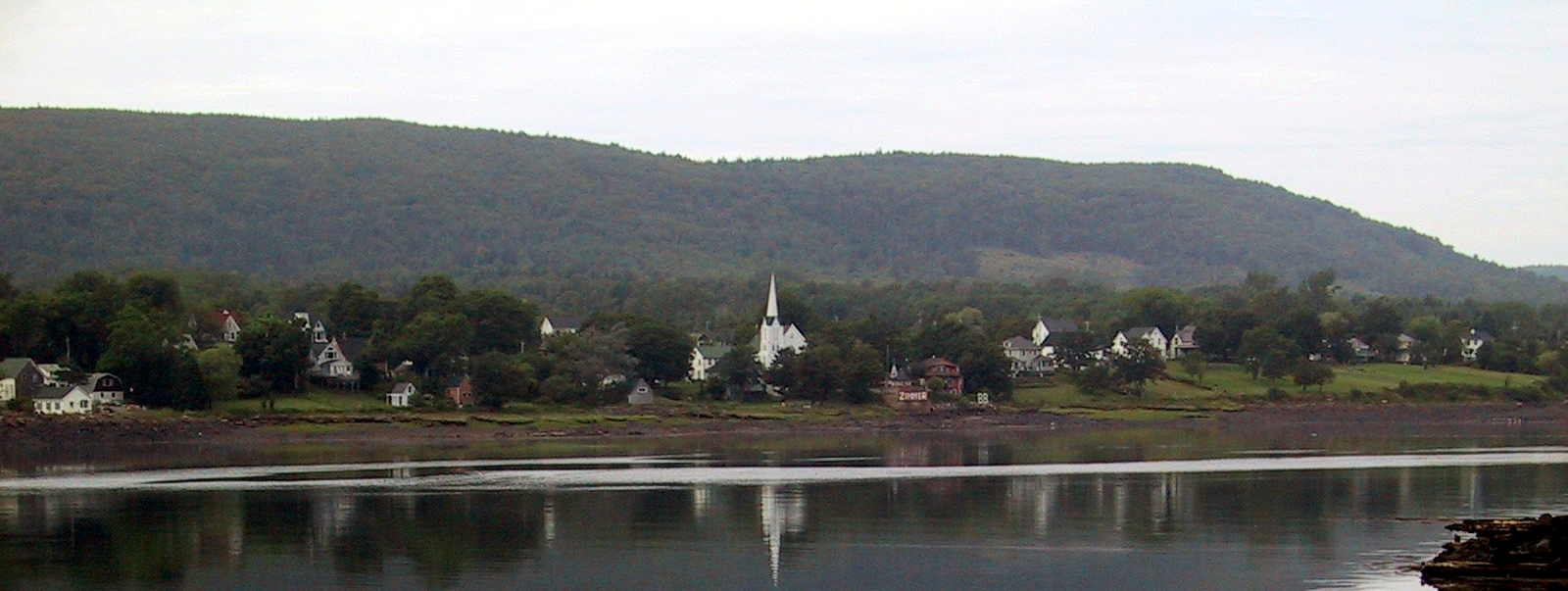
- Annapolis River

Location
- Country: Canada
- Province: Nova Scotia

Physical characteristics
- Source: Caribou Bog
  - location: Kings County
- Mouth: Annapolis Basin
  - location: Upper Clements
  - coordinates: 44°42′10″N 65°36′29″W
  - elevation: sea level
- Length: 120 km (75 mi)
- Basin size: 2,279 km^{2} (880 sq mi)

The Annapolis River (French: Rivière Annapolis or Rivière du Dauphin) is a Canadian river located in Nova Scotia's Annapolis Valley.

== Geography ==
Measuring 120 kilometres in length, the river flows southwest through the western part of the valley from its source in Caribou Bog (50 m [160 ft] above sea level) near the villages of Aylesford and Berwick in western Kings County, to its mouth near Clementsport where it empties into the Annapolis Basin. The estuary portion of the Annapolis River runs from Bridgetown to near Clementsport and experiences a tidal range of approximately 7.5 m (25 ft) between tides.

The eastern part of the Annapolis Valley is drained by the Cornwallis River, also rising in the Caribou Bog, which has been dated to 10,000 years old. According to estimates by the Province of Nova Scotia, there were 31,877 people resident within the Annapolis River watershed in 2011.

The river flows through some of the most productive agricultural land in the province. The comparatively mild micro-climate produced by the valley's North and South mountain ranges, as well as its proximity to the waters of the Bay of Fundy make the region ideal for fruit crops such as apples.

== History ==
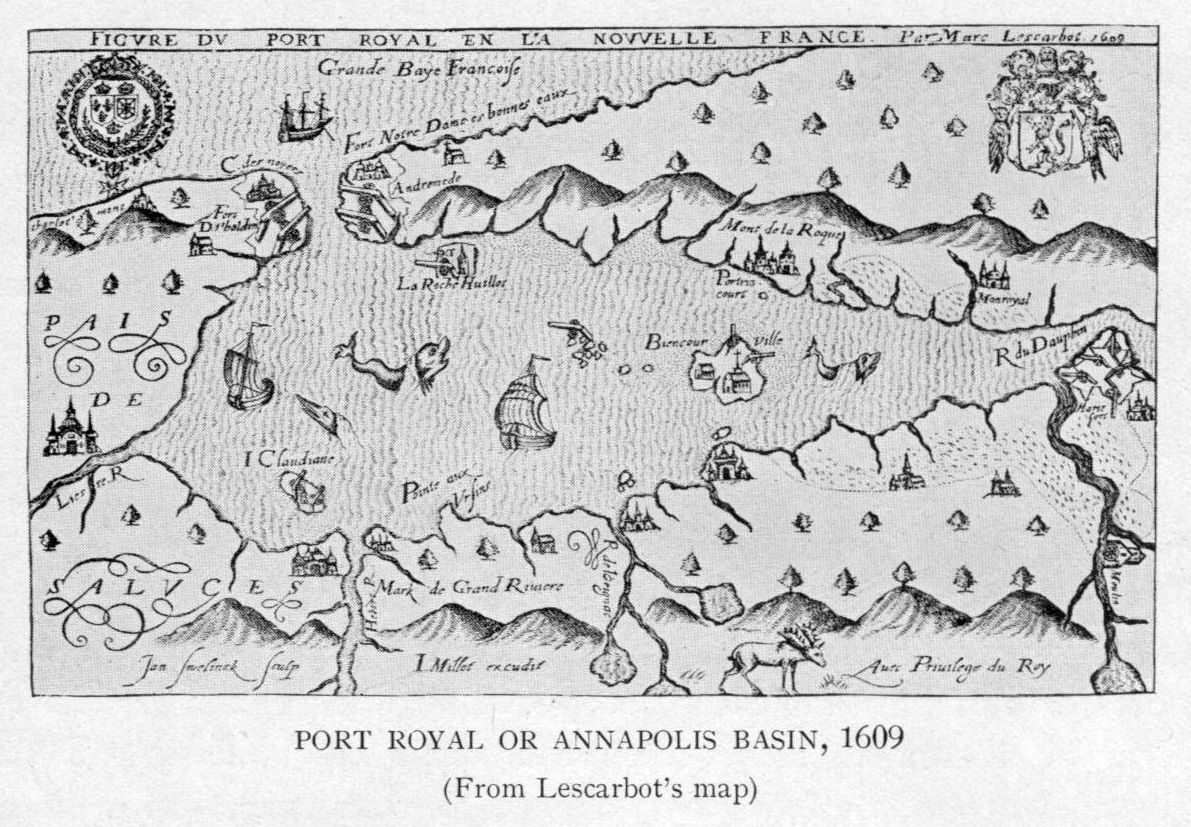
Champlain's map of 1609 showing the river's French name of Rivière du Dauphin.

The indigenous Mi'kmaq people, who had occupied the area for thousands of years, called the river Te'wapskik, meaning "flowing out between high rocks."

The Annapolis River's importance in history is evident through its use as a transportation corridor in early Acadia after Samuel de Champlain and Pierre Dugua, Sieur de Monts established the Habitation at Port-Royal on the north bank of the river's mouth in 1605. Champlain's map of 1609 showed the river as being named "Rivière du Dauphin".

A British attack in 1710 saw this part of Acadia fall from French hands. An Acadian settlement at the mouth of Allains Creek, ten kilometres upriver from Port Royal, was renamed Annapolis Royal, in honour of the reigning monarch, Queen Anne. The river was also given the name Annapolis at this time.

After France relinquished the part of Acadia which is now peninsular Nova Scotia to Britain in 1713, Annapolis Royal became the capital of the British colony of Nova Scotia until 1749; Fort Anne was established at the mouth of Allains Creek where it drains into the river to protect the community from attack.

Throughout the 18th to the 20th century the river was heavily used as a transportation corridor, particularly during the age of sail when sailing ships would sail as far upriver as Bridgetown (the tidehead, and head of navigation); Bridgetown being home to a thriving shipbuilding industry. A ferry service once crossed the river at Annapolis Royal to Granville Ferry on the north bank; it was succeeded by a bridge in the early 20th century.

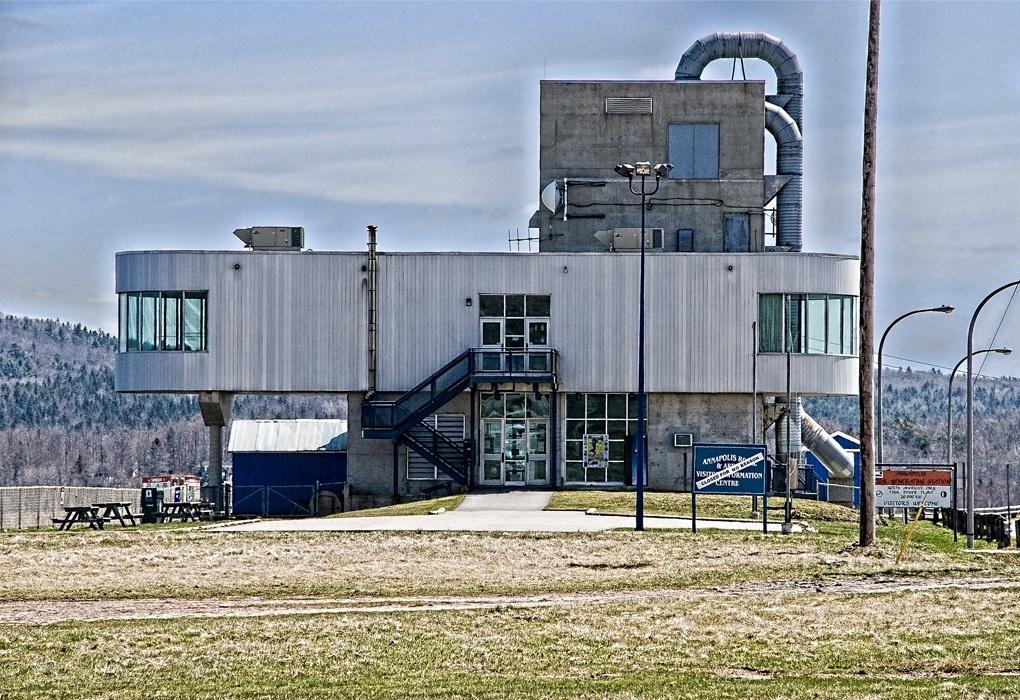
Annapolis Royal Generating Station

In 1984, Nova Scotia Power opened the Annapolis Royal Generating Station, which operated as a tidal power plant. A rock-filled dam now blocks the river between Annapolis Royal and Granville Ferry, carrying Trunk 1 and the stretch of river between Annapolis Royal and Bridgetown is now used as a reservoir. The station ceased operations in 2019.

In the late 1980s, an application to designate the Annapolis River as a Canada federal Heritage River was rejected because of the high levels of pollution in the river from residential and agricultural development. A variety of monitoring and clean-up projects have followed in the wake of the rejection and led to the creation of the Clean Annapolis River Project (CARP).

== Popular culture ==
The title of Dauphin Herald Extraordinary at the Canadian Heraldic Authority is derived from the ancient name of the river.

== Communities ==
Communities located along the Annapolis River in downstream order (from northeast to southwest), include:

- Aylesford East
- Aylesford
- Auburn
- Green Acres
- Kingston
- Greenwood
- South Farmington
- Wilmot
- Nictaux East
- Middleton
- Nictaux
- Lower Middleton
- Nictaux West
- Brickton
- North Williamston
- Lawrencetown
- West Lawrencetown
- Paradise
- West Paradise
- Bridgetown
- Carleton Corner
- Centrelea
- Upper Granville
- Tupperville
- Belleisle
- Round Hill
- Granville Centre
- Moschelle
- Lequille
- Annapolis Royal
- Granville Ferry
- Allains Creek
- Granville Beach
- Upper Clements
- Port Royal

== See also ==
- List of rivers of Nova Scotia
