= Nova Scotia Route 201 =

Highway in Nova Scotia, Canada

Route 201

Route information
- Maintained by Nova Scotia Department of Transportation and Infrastructure Renewal
- Length: 38 km (24 mi)

Major junctions
- West end: Trunk 8 in Annapolis Royal
- Hwy 101 near Bridgetown; Trunk 10 in Nictaux Falls
- East end: Trunk 1 in Kingston (Green Acres)

Location
- Country: Canada
- Province: Nova Scotia
- Counties: Annapolis

Highway system
- Provincial highways in Nova Scotia; 100-series
← Hwy 162	→ Route 202

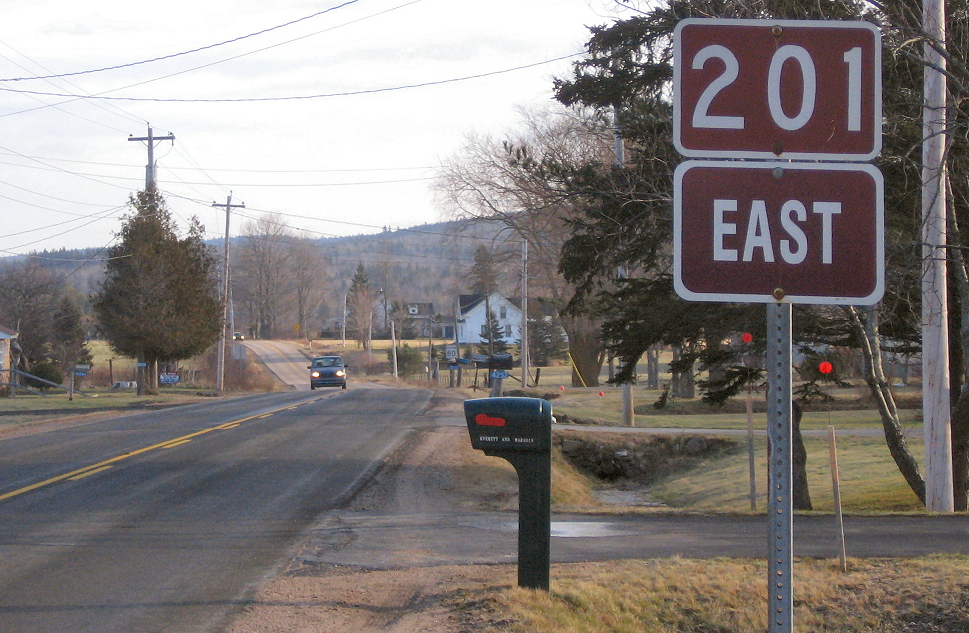
View of Route 201 outside Bridgetown.

Route 201 is a collector road in the Canadian province of Nova Scotia.

It is located in the Annapolis Valley and runs from Annapolis Royal to Kingston. Heading west from its junction with Trunk 1 the route follows the southern banks of the Annapolis River through the communities of Nictaux, Lawrencetown, and Paradise before crossing over Highway 101 into the town Bridgetown. After exiting the town the route continues west where it terminates at a junction with Route 8 in the town of Annapolis Royal.

The highway is designated as a bicycle route.

== Communities ==
- Lequille
- Moschelle
- Round Hill
- Tupperville
- Centrelea
- Carleton Corner
- West Paradise
- Paradise
- Lawrencetown
- South Williamston
- Nictaux West
- Nictaux
- South Farmington
- Meadowvale
- Greenwood
- South Greenwood
- Greenwood Square
- East Kingston

== Roads ==
- Trunk 8

== Parks ==
- Annapolis Royal Historic Gardens
- Bloody Creek National Historic Site

== See also ==
- List of Nova Scotia provincial highways
