= Nova Scotia Trunk 8 =

Highway in Nova Scotia, Canada

Trunk 8
- Kejimkujik Scenic Drive
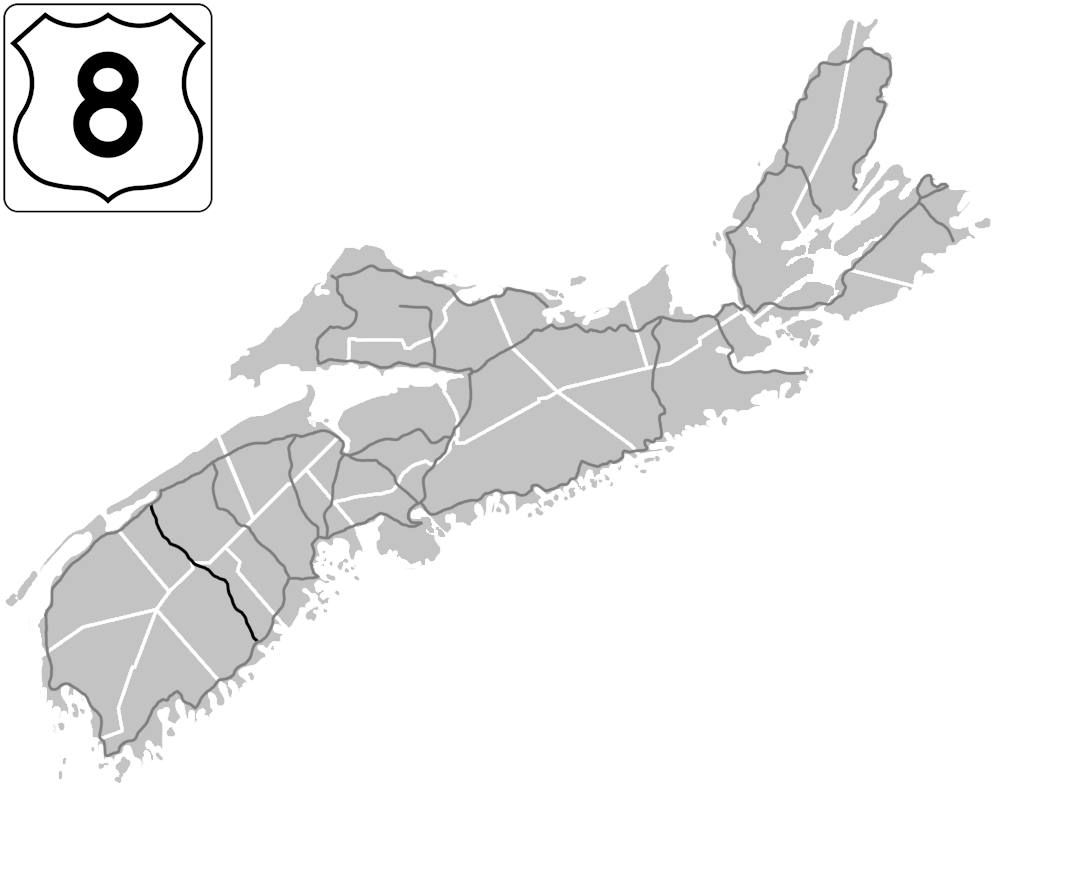

Route information
- Maintained by Department of Transportation and Infrastructure Renewal
- Length: 112.9 km (70.2 mi)

Major junctions
- South end: Trunk 3 in Liverpool
- Hwy 103 in Liverpool; Hwy 101 near Lequille
- North end: Trunk 1 in Annapolis Royal

Location
- Country: Canada
- Province: Nova Scotia
- Counties: Queens, Annapolis
- Towns: Liverpool, Annapolis Royal

Highway system
- Provincial highways in Nova Scotia; 100-series
| ← Trunk 7 | → Trunk 10 |

Trunk 8 is part of the Canadian province of Nova Scotia's system of Trunk Highways. The route runs from Liverpool to Annapolis Royal, a distance of 113 kilometres (70 mi). Trunk 8 is also known as the Kejimkujik Scenic Drive.

== Route description ==
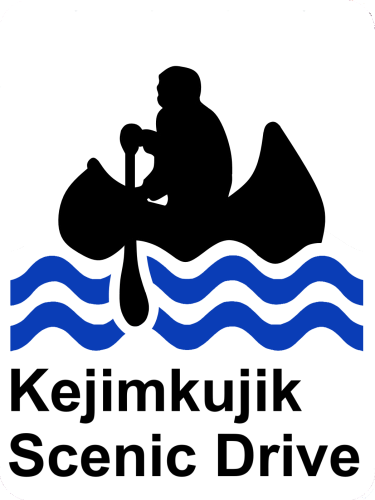

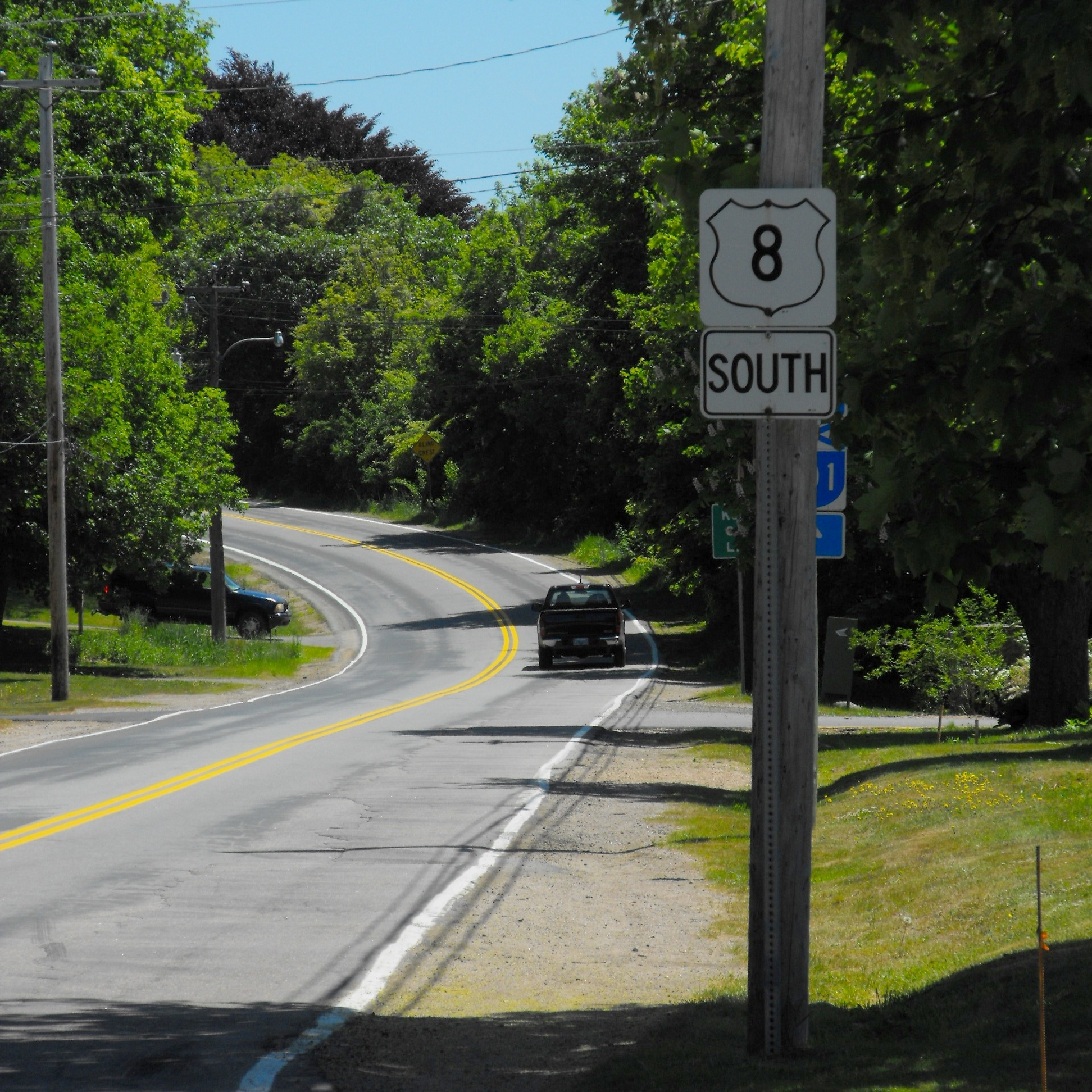
Trunk 8 in Annapolis Royal.

From Liverpool, Trunk 8 runs in a northwesterly direction, following the east bank of the Mersey River to Milton. North of Milton, the road leaves the river, mostly travelling through forest land, to the village of Caledonia and west to the main entrance to Kejimkujik National Park. Trunk 8 crosses the Mersey River again at Maitland Bridge, following its west bank and the shores of several lakes to Milford; where it continues northward to the village of Lequille and the town of Annapolis Royal, where the route ends.

== Major intersections ==
| County | Location | km | mi | Destinations | Notes |
|---|---|---|---|---|---|
| Queens | Liverpool | 0.0 | 0.0 | Trunk 3 (Lighthouse Route / Bristol Road) – Bristol, Port Mouton | Southern terminus |
| Queens | Liverpool | 0.5 | 0.31 | Hwy 103 – Bridgewater, Halifax, Shelburne, Yarmouth | Hwy 103 exit 19 |
| Queens | | 21.4 | 13.3 | Route 210 east – Greenfield, Chelsea | |
| Queens | Caledonia | 44.6 | 27.7 | Route 208 east – New Germany, Bridgewater | |
| Annapolis | Kejimkujik National Park | 66.0 | 41.0 | Kejimkujik Main Parkway | |
| Annapolis | Maitland Bridge | 67.1 | 41.7 | Crosses the Mersey River | |
| Annapolis | | 107.7 | 66.9 | Hwy 101 – Bridgetown, Halifax, Deep Brook, Digby, Yarmouth | Hwy 101 exit 22 |
| Annapolis | Annapolis Royal | 112.4 | 69.8 | Route 201 east – Moschelle, Round Hill | |
| Annapolis | Annapolis Royal | 112.9 | 70.2 | Trunk 1 (Evangeline Trail) – Digby, Bridgetown, Halifax | Northern terminus |
1.000 mi = 1.609 km; 1.000 km = 0.621 mi

== See also ==
- List of Nova Scotia provincial highways
