= Bessie Hall =

Canadian seafarer

Elizabeth (Bessie) Pritchard Hall
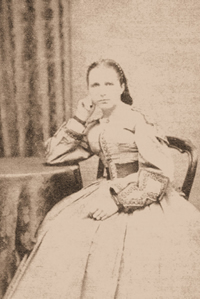
- Born: 7 April 1849; Granville Beach, Nova Scotia, Canada
- Died: June 30, 1930 (aged 81); Brookline, Mass., United States
- Resting place: Stoney Beach Cemetery, Granville Beach, Nova Scotia
- Known for: Seafaring skills and courage

Elizabeth Pritchard Hall (1849 – 1930) was a seafaring woman from Granville Beach, Nova Scotia. She is notable for taking command of a fever-ridden ship in 1870 and safely navigating it through storms from Florida to Liverpool, England.

== Family ==
Elizabeth Hall, usually known as Bessie Hall, was born in Granville Beach (Lower Granville), Nova Scotia on 7 April 1849, the daughter of Captain Joseph Hall and Priscilla (Cushing) Hall. According to an 1871 deed, Captain Hall and his wife Priscilla purchased a home in Granville Beach (Lower Granville) from the Hon. James W. Johnson. The deed states that Captain Hall had been residing there for several years, likely with his daughter Bessie. This house still exists as a private residence. The Halls were a well-known family of shipbuilders and ship captains in Annapolis County, Nova Scotia. Bessie began to go to sea when she was 17, joining her father on deep sea voyages in the family's large square rigged sailing vessels. She showed great interest in navigation. Her father taught her Celestial navigation and ship handling as she assisted him in plotting voyages. In 1883, Captain Joseph Hall sold his Granville Beach house after building a new one in Granville Ferry around 1881. This newer house once operated as a bed and breakfast, named "The Seafaring Maiden" in honor of Captain Hall's famous daughter. The bed and breakfast has ceased operating.

== Notable voyage ==
In 1870, Bessie Hall and her father arrived in New Orleans from Liverpool aboard the 1444-ton ship Rothesay to load a cargo of cotton. The cargo was delayed for two months due to financial problems with the shipper, causing a considerable number of the crew to desert and sign on to other vessels. To make up for the long delay, Capt. Hall decided to risk sailing shorthanded. He left New Orleans on March 24, 1870, with a crew of six sailors, plus the first mate, a cook, an elderly carpenter – and Bessie.

Four days into the voyage, the First Mate fell ill with smallpox and was quarantined to his cabin. Capt. Hall kept the small pox secret to avoid panic. However on April 2, Capt. Hall also came down with smallpox, just as the ship rounded the tip of Florida and encountered mounting squalls as it entered the Gulf Stream. Capt. Hall had just enough energy to direct the crew in reducing sail to storm canvas, a minimum set of strong lower sails, before he collapsed with fever and was taken below. He told Bessie she would have to take command with the carpenter as first mate.

A delegate from the crew approached Bessie and said, "We know about the smallpox. Can you take this ship to England?". "I can," was Bessie's reply. She held a meeting in the saloon where the crew expressed their support for the 20-year-old woman and discussed alternatives. Bessie considered the options of turning back or changing course for Saint John, New Brunswick but decided to press on for Liverpool.

In the days that followed, the squalls grew to a series of gales. Bessie navigated by dead reckoning and stood night watches from 8 pm to 2 am. On April 18, the skies briefly cleared and Bessie took sun sights with the sextant finding their position to be near the tip of the Grand Banks. Adjusting course for Liverpool, Bessie had to contend with light and contrary winds with a crew too small to add much canvas. However she safely brought the ship to the Irish Sea where they picked up a pilot who took the ship into Liverpool where they arrived on May 12 just as Capt. Hall and the mate began to recover. As Bessie stepped ashore in her "rough sailor's garb", she was cheered by the crew. The ship Rothesay had been given up for lost and grateful insurers planned a large public banquet in Bessie's honour. However, this plan was scuttled as the ship's owners, making up for delays, had rushed the ship without clearing quarantine regulations and did not want to publicize the smallpox aboard. As result, Bessie's accomplishment and skills remained only the talk of working mariners.

== Later life ==
Bessie continued to sail with her father for another year, making her final voyage to the Falkland Islands when she was 21. Despite her interest in seafaring and navigation, no women were allowed to apply for mates or captains papers in the 19th century. (It was not until 1938 that Molly Kool, from Alma, New Brunswick, broke through to become the first female captain in North America.)

Bessie left the sea and married James Reed Hall, a second cousin on March 14, 1877. They settled in Granville Beach where she raised four children. From time to time, grizzled sailors from steamships calling at nearby Annapolis Royal would make their way to Granville to meet the girl who saved her family's ship. Bessie never forgot the sea and on her 80th birthday, she amazed a visiting Royal Navy officer with her detailed knowledge of the lighthouses, headlands and shoals of the English Channel. Hall died on June 30, 1930. She is buried in the Stoney Beach Cemetery near her childhood home and the site of the old Hall family shipyard.
