= Schafner Point Lighthouse =

Lighthouse in Nova Scotia, Canada

Coordinates: 44.709869°N 65.619096°W

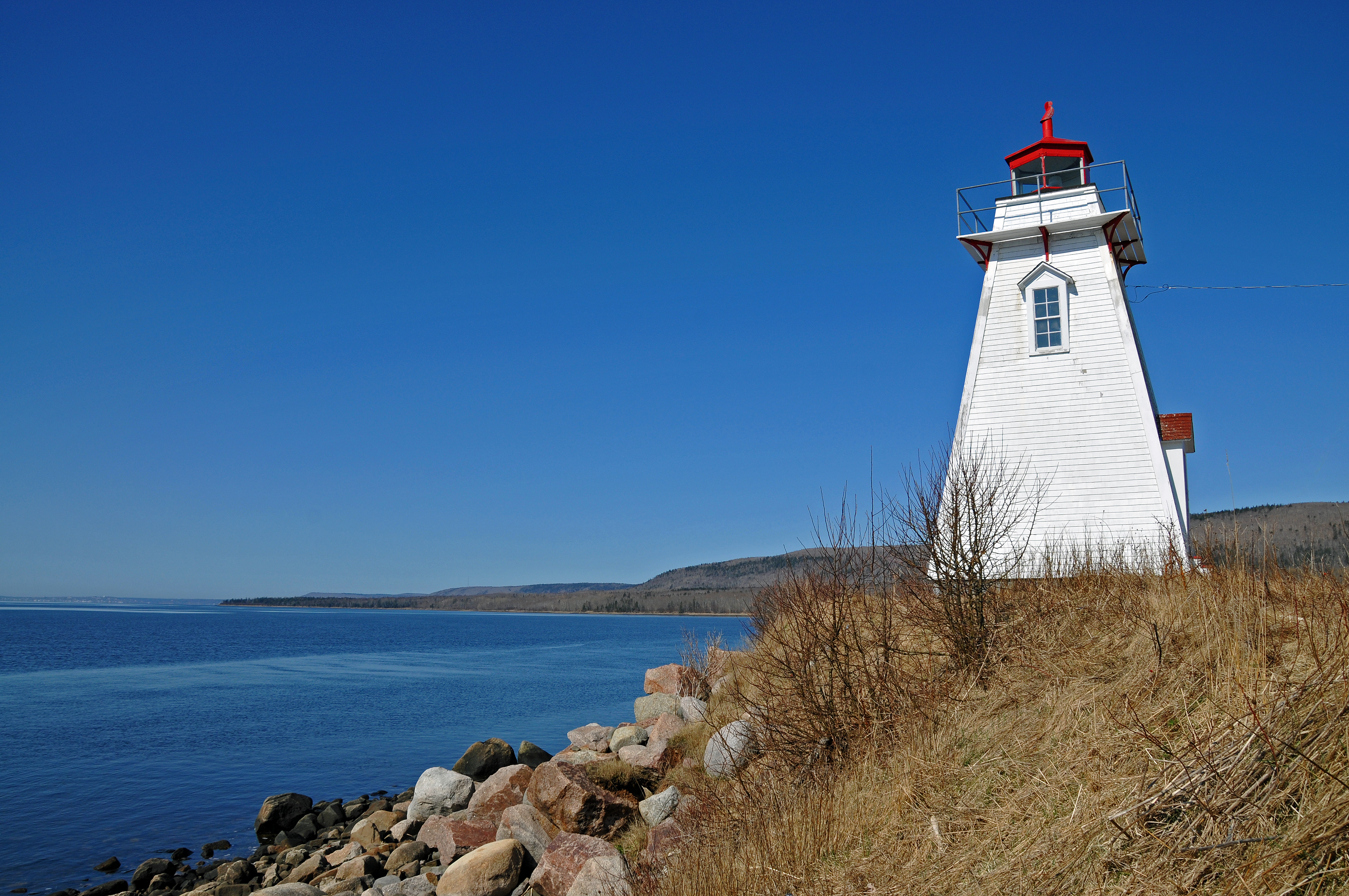
Lighthouse DSC 3753 - Schafner Point Lighthouse (2464770940)

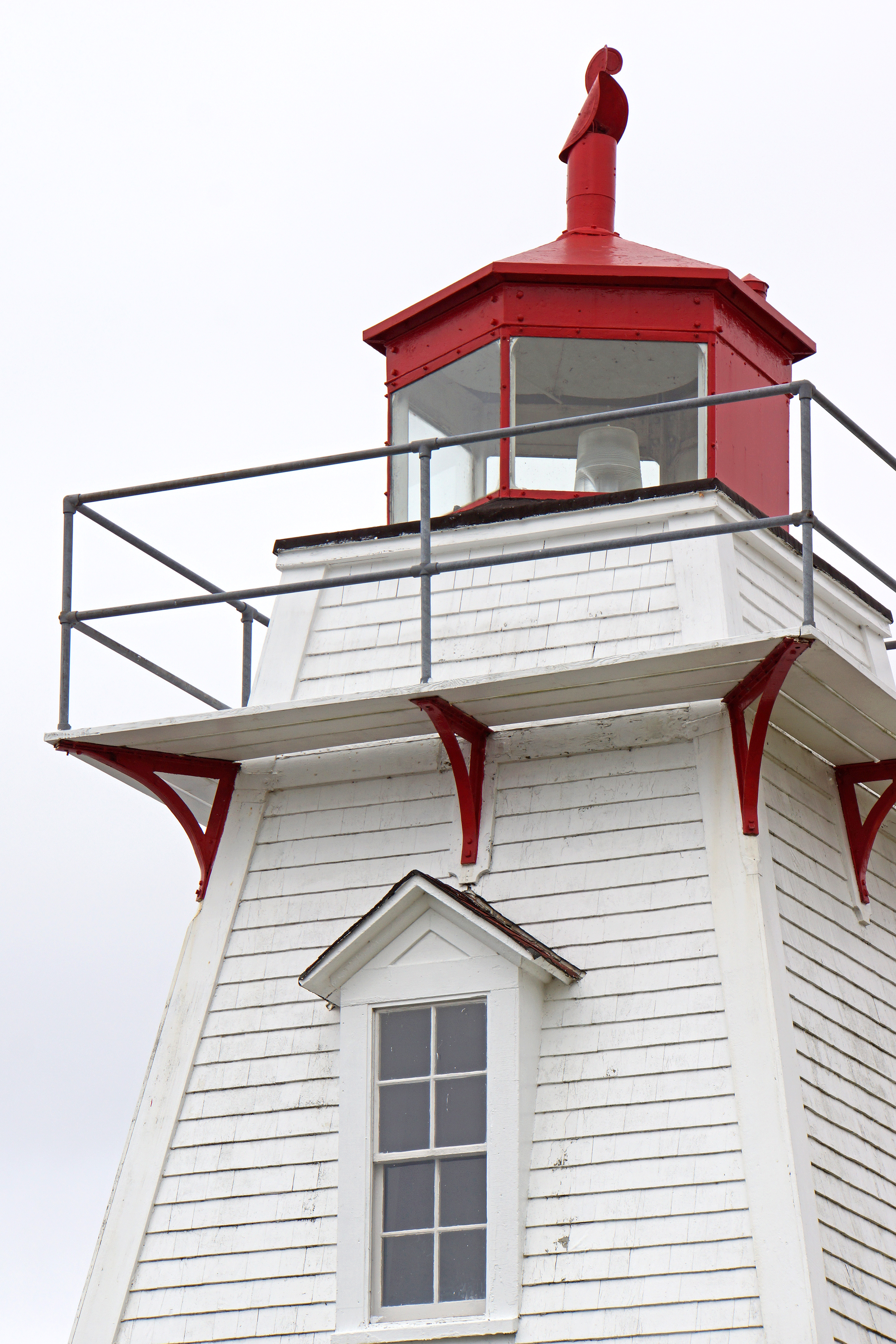
Lighthouse DSC02657 - Shafner's Point Lighthouse (7986951993)

Schafner Point Lighthouse is located in Annapolis County, Nova Scotia, on the north side of the Annapolis Basin facing Goat Island. It was built in 1885. It is known locally as the Port Royal lighthouse. It is a wooden construction with a square plan and tapered sides, supporting a gallery and octagonal iron lantern housing. It is protected by the Heritage Lighthouse Protection Act.
