= West Brooklyn =

West Brooklyn may refer to:

- West Brooklyn, Nova Scotia, Canada
- West Brooklyn, Illinois, United States
- West Brooklyn (West End Line), now Fort Hamilton Parkway station, a New York City Subway station, United States
