= Nictaux South =

Coordinates: 44°51′59″N 65°02′03″W

Nictaux South in Nova Scotia

Nictaux South is a community in the Canadian province of Nova Scotia, located in Annapolis County, on Nova Scotia Route 10, south of Nictaux Falls and Nictaux.
