= Nictaux =

Community in Nova Scotia, Canada

Coordinates: 44°55′36″N 65°02′54″W

Nictaux in Nova Scotia

Nictaux is a community in the Canadian province of Nova Scotia, located in Annapolis County. Nictaux is at the intersection of Highway 10 and Highway 201. The name Nictaux comes from the Mi'kmaq word Niktak, meaning 'The forks of a river'.

Since the Nictaux school was closed in 1987, the children there have been bused across the Annapolis River to Middleton. The community does however maintain its own volunteer fire department.

Other communities in the area with a similar name are Nictaux Falls, Nictaux South, Nictaux East and Nictaux West.
