= Trout Lake (Annapolis County, Nova Scotia) =

- Location within Nova Scotia
- Location: Annapolis County, Nova Scotia, Canada
- Coordinates: 44.775122°N 65.068978°W
- Type: lake

Trout Lake is a lake situated in Annapolis County, Nova Scotia, at an elevation of approximately 200 metres (660 ft).
