= Port Royal, Annapolis County, Nova Scotia =

Unincorporated hamlet in Nova Scotia, Canada

Coordinates: 44°43′00″N 65°36′13″W

Port Royal is a toponym for a rural intersection on the north bank of the Annapolis Basin about 8 km (5.0 mi) from the town of Annapolis Royal in Annapolis County, Nova Scotia, Canada. It has no legal status in local government and the postal address is Granville Ferry.
