= Evangeline Trail =

Scenic roadway in Nova Scotia, Canada

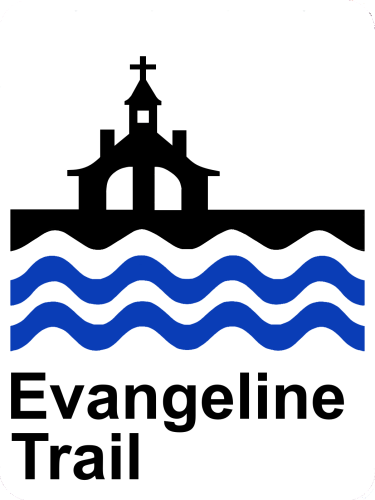
Evangeline Trail

Route information
- Maintained by Department of Transportation and Infrastructure Renewal
- Length: 292 km (181 mi)
- Component highways: Trunk 1 Hwy 101

Major junctions
- East end: Hwy 101 / Hwy 102 / Trunk 1 in Bedford
- West end: Trunk 3 in Yarmouth

Location
- Country: Canada
- Province: Nova Scotia

Highway system
- Provincial highways in Nova Scotia; 100-series

The Evangeline Trail is a scenic roadway in the Canadian province of Nova Scotia.

It is located in the western part of the province, bringing visitors to the Minas Basin, the Annapolis Valley and the Gulf of Maine. The route connects Mount Uniacke in Hants County with Yarmouth at the Bay Ferries terminal where ferries connect to Maine in the United States.

The route measures 292 km (181 mi).

== Name ==
Traveling through many communities in which Acadians once made their homes and still do, the route is named after the principal character in the epic poem Evangeline by Henry Wadsworth Longfellow. The region from Yarmouth to Halifax via the Annapolis Valley was first connected by the Dominion Atlantic Railway, which is credited with instigating the province's nascent tourism industry during the early 20th century; the DAR was titled "The Land of Evangeline Route" and the Evangeline Trail pays homage to this transport predecessor.

== Communities include ==
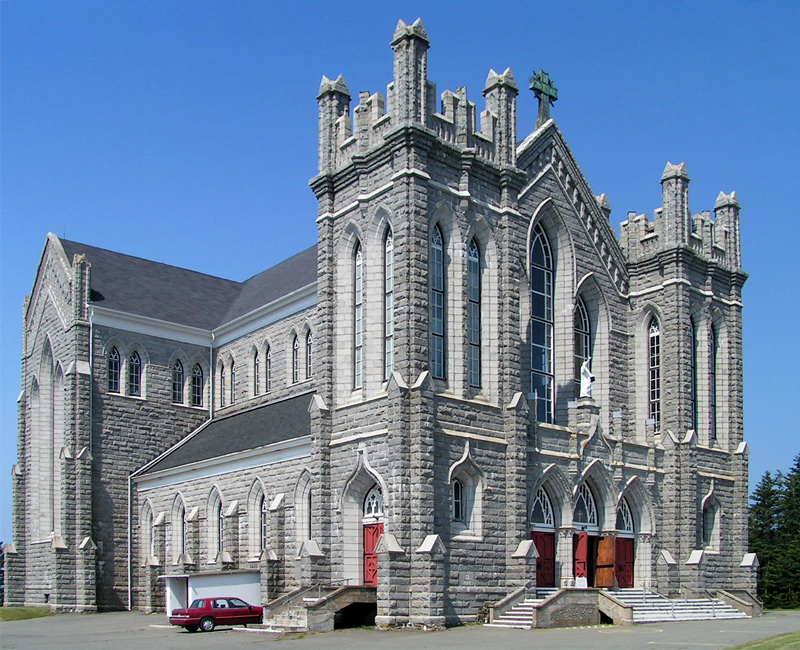
St. Bernard near Weymouth

- Lower Sackville
- Mount Uniacke
- Windsor
- Hantsport
- Wolfville
- New Minas
- Kentville
- Berwick
- Aylesford
- Kingston
- Middleton
- Lawrencetown
- Bridgetown
- Annapolis Royal
- Digby
- Weymouth
- Church Point
- Meteghan
- Yarmouth

== Parks ==
- Annapolis Royal Historic Gardens

== Museums ==
- Uniacke Estate Museum
- Shand House Museum
- Fort Edward National Historic Site
- Halliburton House Museum
- Grand Pre National Historic Site
- Randall House Museum
- Greenwood Military Museum
- MacDonald Museum
- North Hills Museum
- Fort Anne National Historic Site
- Habitation at Port-Royal
- St. Mary's Church (Church Point)
- Firefighters' Museum of Nova Scotia
- Yarmouth County Museum

== Highways ==
- Trunk 1
- Highway 101
