= Albany, Nova Scotia =

Community in Nova Scotia, Canada

Coordinates: 44°47′56.45″N 65°3′21.5″W

Albany in Nova Scotia

Albany is a community in the Canadian province of Nova Scotia, located in Annapolis County. It is situated on Nova Scotia Trunk 10 at an elevation of around 200m near Trout Lake (Annapolis County, Nova Scotia).
