= Centre of Geographic Sciences =

College in Nova Scotia, Canada

- Former names: Nova Scotia Land Survey Institute
- Established: 1948
- Principal: Wayne F. St-Amour
- Academic staff: 25
- Students: 250
- Location: Lawrencetown, Nova Scotia; 44°53.090′N 65°10.091′W
- Campus: Annapolis Valley Campus
- Website: nscc.ca/cogs/

The Centre of Geographic Sciences (COGS) is a technical educational institution in the Canadian province of Nova Scotia, located in the village of Lawrencetown. Part of the Nova Scotia Community College (NSCC), COGS is the largest geomatics education facility in Canada.

== History ==
COGS traces its history to 1948 when the Nova Scotia Land Survey Institute (NSLSI) was established by Major J.A.H. Church (retired) as a training institution for survey and map production. NSLSI became a world leader in geomatics education during the 1970s and 1980s as it evolved into incorporating then-revolutionary technologies such as remote sensing and geographic information systems (GIS). The institute moved into its current campus during this period in the 1970s.

In 1986, NSLSI was renamed the College of Geographic Sciences (COGS) as a publicly funded training college under an act of the Nova Scotia House of Assembly. The name was considered to better reflect the diversity of geographic sciences taught at the NSLSI.

In 1988, the provincial government undertook a much-needed reform to its training colleges and created the Nova Scotia Community College (NSCC) system the following year. While still a separate college, COGS was administratively placed within the NSCC umbrella.

In 1998 NSCC created the Annapolis Valley Campus by administratively combining the geographically separate campuses at Lawrencetown and Middleton. All geomatics advanced diploma programs were grouped under the Centre of Geographic Sciences (COGS), of which the majority are delivered at the Lawrencetown site (as the former Lawrencetown campus is now called).

== Organization ==
COGS is divided into three departments:

- Geomatics
- Information Technology
- Applied Geomatics Research Group (AGRG)
