= Caledonia, Nova Scotia =

Community in Nova Scotia, Canada

Coordinates: 44°22′44″N 65°1′56″W

Caledonia in Nova Scotia

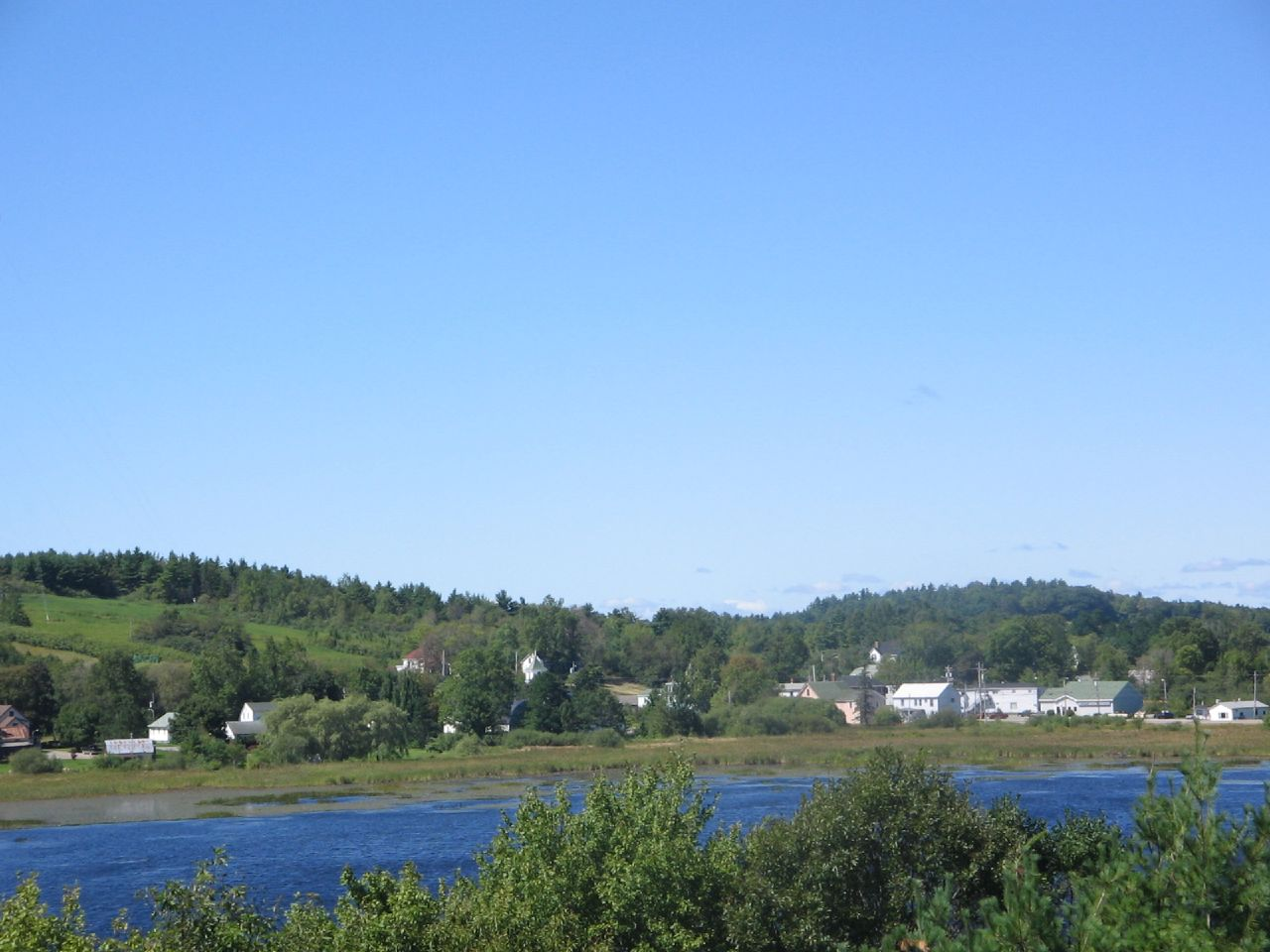
View of Caledonia

Caledonia is a community located in northern Region of Queens Municipality, Nova Scotia, Canada, along Trunk 8 (Kejimkujik Scenic Drive). Caledonia is the major community in the area known as North Queens, which has a radius of approximately 30 kilometers (20 miles) and a population of approximately 1500.

== Geography ==
Caledonia is 50 kilometres (31 mi) north of Liverpool along Highway 8. Seventeen kilometres (11 mi) further north of Caledonia, in Maitland Bridge, is the main entrance to Kejimkujik National Park.

== History ==
The original inhabitants of the Caledonia area are the Mi'kmaq people. Before the arrival of European settlers, the Mi'kmaq who lived here used the area as hunting grounds due to its reported abundance of wildlife. The Mi'kmaq established favorable relationships with the settlers once they arrived.

The original settlers of Caledonia were six Scots and an Irishman, who settled on the seven hills in greater Caledonia. Caledonia was the Latin name given by the Romans to the area of modern-day Scotland, and with Nova Scotia translating as 'New Scotland', also from Latin, the names in the area obviously reflect this heritage.

Throughout the 18th and 19th centuries, the Mi'kmaq often found employment serving as guides for visitors to the area who were seeking to go on wilderness expeditions. One notable Mi'kmaq guide in the area was Joseph Gloade, who guided some of the earliest Europeans in the area on hunting trips beginning in the late 18th century.

== Early settlers ==
Caledonia was established in 1820 by a group of nine settlers, composed of seven Scotsmen and two Irishman, who laid the foundation for this Nova Scotian community through their pioneering efforts in agriculture and forestry.

Alexander Spears
A native of Greenock, Scotland, Alexander Spears was pivotal in the agricultural development of Caledonia. He settled on land overlooking Lake Nancy and was instrumental in community building.

Andrew McLeod
Described as a "bare-kneed Highlander," McLeod was known for his contributions to clearing and farming the land. He married Sarah Lohnes from Lunenburg County and built a legacy of land stewardship.

Edward Hayes
The only Irishman among the original settlers, Edward Hayes owned land strategically positioned on both sides of the road to Caledonia. His descendants played significant roles in the local community.

Allan MacLean
Like his fellow Scots, Allan MacLean contributed to the initial clearing and settlement of the area, with his land spanning crucial parts of what would become Caledonia.

Richard Telfer
Known for his significant contribution to community infrastructure, Telfer’s wife, Mary, was honored in the naming of Lake Mary, a local landmark.

John Douglas
As one of the key figures in early Caledonia, Douglas's extensive landholdings and his descendants significantly shaped the community's development over generations.

George Middlemas
Along with his brother David, George Middlemas was central to the early community structure, contributing to both the social and economic fabric of Caledonia.

David Middlemas
David, together with George, worked on establishing the settlement’s early infrastructure, which played a crucial role in the community’s development.
Thomas Jones and Patrick Lacey, veterans of the Napoleonic wars,
were the two Irishmen who homesteaded gaining land grants of two hundred acres in 1821. They worked together until both were established enough to each have a farm and family. Thomas Jones's brother Patrick Jones received a land grant of 100 acres in 1848.

These settlers forged a community in a landscape of virgin forests, establishing large farms and a closely-knit community that has maintained its rural charm and heritage to this day.

In 1884, Caledonia served as the hub for the gold rush in the nearby communities of Whiteburne and North Brookfield.

The N.F. Douglas lumber mill in Caledonia was one of the area's main employers until its closure in 2014. Other industries include forestry, farming, a blueberry processing operation, and Kejimkujik National Park. Caledonia has a range of shops and services including; grocery, pharmacy, hardware store, post office, cafe/restaurants, medical centre, outdoor swimming pool and a Nova Scotia Liquor Commission outlet.

North Queens Community School, operated by South Shore Regional School Board, provides education from grades primary to twelve.

Each September, Caledonia plays host to the Queens County Fair, which includes a parade and one of the oldest agricultural exhibitions in Nova Scotia.

Caledonia was formerly the end of a Canadian National Railway branch line. The line was long ago abandoned but has recently been refurbished as part of a rails-to-trails program by the Brookfield Mines Trails Association, creating a multi-use path from Caledonia to Colpton. The 18 km stretch of trail has signage, gates, and benches.

== Prominent figures ==
Caledonia has been shaped by numerous influential individuals known for their significant contributions to the community's development and cultural heritage. Below are ten prominent figures who have left a lasting impact on Caledonia, Nova Scotia, along with the approximate eras during which they were most active.

John Douglas (circa 1820s)
One of the original settlers of Caledonia, John Douglas played a pivotal role in the early development of the community. His family continued to influence the area for generations, engaging in various businesses and community services.

Arnold Patterson (circa early 20th century)
A World War I veteran, Arnold Patterson was known for his contribution to building homes in Caledonia and his active involvement in community affairs.

Milton Douglas (circa late 19th century)
A descendant of John Douglas, Milton Douglas maintained the family's legacy through continued community involvement and maintaining the original Douglas homestead.

George Wile (circa early 20th century)
Acquired significant land originally cleared by early settlers, contributing to both community development and the local economy through his farming activities.

Basil Huskins (circa mid-20th century)
Moved to Caledonia in 1960, Huskins became well known for his involvement in local agriculture and his community-oriented initiatives, enhancing the social fabric of Caledonia.

Oran Veinot (circa late 20th century)
Noted for his agricultural contributions, Oran Veinot was also an enthusiastic participant in local ox pulling contests, bringing recognition to Caledonian agricultural practices.

Jonathan Kempton (circa mid-20th century)
Raised a family on a farm in Caledonia and contributed to the community through various civic engagements.

George Rafuse (circa mid-20th century)
Owned a farm in Caledonia and was active in community development. His family's movements and land transactions further shaped the local landscape.

Edward Hayes (circa 1820s)
One of the eight original settlers, Edward Hayes's family was integral to the early settler community, and their interactions with other families helped shape the social structure of Caledonia.

Alexander Spears (circa 1820s)
Another original settler, Alexander Spears was influential in early agricultural development and community building efforts in Caledonia.

These individuals represent a fraction of those who have contributed to making Caledonia a vibrant and enduring community in Nova Scotia. Their stories are preserved in the local historical records and continue to inspire current and future generations.

== Communications ==
- Postal Code B0T 1B0
- Telephone exchange
  - 902 – 682- Aliant
  - 902 – 390- Telus
- Wireless Broadband provided by EastLink Rural Wireless Internet under the Government of Nova Scotia's Broadband for Rural Nova Scotia initiative
- Television
  - CBHT Channel 2 – 600W
  - CJCH Channel 6
  - Cable

== Demographics ==
- Total Dwellings – 400
- Total Land Area – 184.235 km^{2}
