= Belleisle, Nova Scotia =

Community in Nova Scotia, Canada

Coordinates: 44°48′5.65″N 65°23′57.15″W

Belleisle in Nova Scotia

Belleisle is a community in the Canadian province of Nova Scotia, located in Annapolis County. It is on Nova Scotia Trunk 1, on the north side of the Annapolis River.

Its name most likely comes from Le Sieur de Belleisle who took control of Annapolis following the 1667 Treaty of Breda. It was first settled by the French around 1680 and later by the British in 1760.

Parker Farm is a farmhouse noted as an early example of brick architecture in Nova Scotia. It was built by the son of a New England Planter who was granted land expropriated from Acadian farmers in 1765. The house took six years to build and was completed in 1797. It is a provincially registered heritage building.
