= Perotte, Nova Scotia =

Community in Nova Scotia, Canada

Coordinates: 44°41′42.72″N 65°24′22.18″W

Perotte in Nova Scotia

Perotte is a community in the Canadian province of Nova Scotia, located in Annapolis County.
