= Albany Cross =

Community in Nova Scotia, Canada

Coordinates: 44°43′9.9″N 65°1′15.12″W

Albany Cross in Nova Scotia

Albany Cross is a community in the Canadian province of Nova Scotia, located in Annapolis County. It is likely named for Albany, New York. Albany Community Church was dedicated in 1875 as a Baptist church and is now a municipally registered heritage building.
