= Adams-Ritchie House =

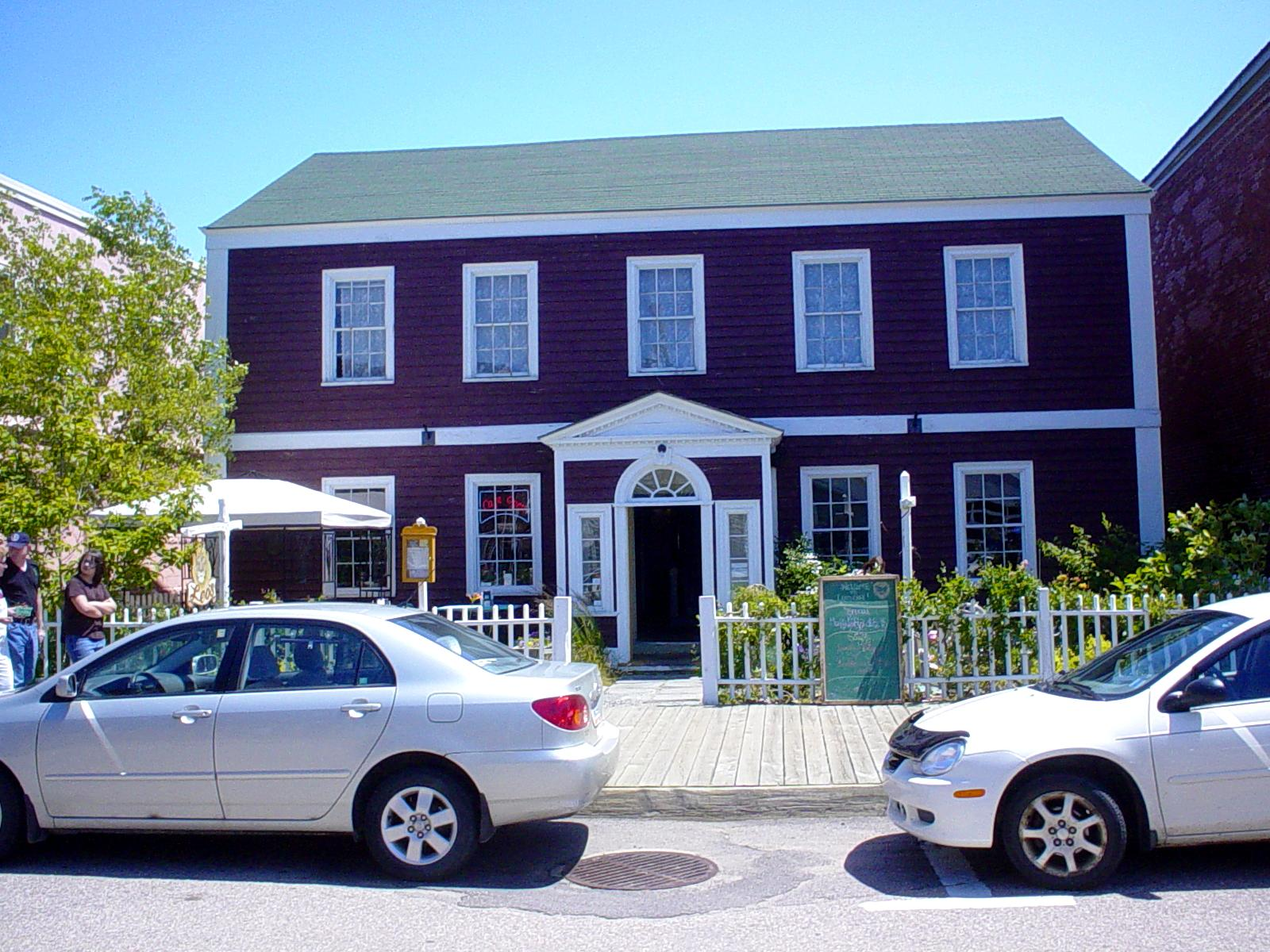

- Location within Nova Scotia
- Alternative names: Muise Hotel

General information
- Architectural style: Georgian
- Location: 220-224 St. George Street, Annapolis Royal, Canada
- Coordinates: 44.74488°N 65.51908°W
- Year built: 1713

Design and construction
- Designations

Nova Scotia Heritage Property Act

The Adams-Ritchie House is one of the oldest wood framed buildings in Canada. It is located in Annapolis Royal, Nova Scotia, Canada and dates from 1713. Over the past 300 years, the building was expanded and embellished until the original building was completely hidden. In the 1980s, it was restored to its original appearance. Prior to 1749, the house occasionally hosted the Nova Scotia Council, the fore-runner of the Nova Scotia House of Assembly.

== History ==
The building was built by John Adams, a native of Boston, Massachusetts in 1713. Adams was a member of the first Nova Scotia Council in 1720 and eventually became its President in 1740.

In 1781, John Ritchie, acquired the property and probably added the second story. He was the local representative to the Nova Scotia House of Assembly. Ritchie was captured and held hostage by American Revolutionaries during the 1781 Raid on Annapolis Royal. His son Thomas Ritchie, who was a lawyer, judge also a member of the Nova Scotia House of Assembly, was raised in the house. Thomas' son, John William Ritchie, a Father of Canadian Confederation, was also born in the house.

In 1881, Arthur King expanded the building again and lived at the house, in additional to running a retail outlet, photography shop and clothing factory.

== See also ==
- List of oldest buildings in Canada
- Historic District of Annapolis Royal
- Annapolis Royal (Town)
