= Clementsvale =

Community in Nova Scotia, Canada

Coordinates: 44°37′3.8″N 65°33′46.7″W

Clementsvale in Nova Scotia

Clementsvale is a community in the Canadian province of Nova Scotia, located in Annapolis County.
