= Maitland Bridge =

Community in Nova Scotia, Canada

Coordinates: 44°26′23.67″N 65°11′54.11″W

Maitland Bridge in Nova Scotia

Maitland Bridge is a community in the Canadian province of Nova Scotia, located in Annapolis County on Trunk 8 which crosses the Mersey River here. It is named after General Sir Peregrine Maitland, Lieutenant Governor of Nova Scotia from 1828 to 1834. The entrance to Kejimkujik National Park is at Maitland Bridge.
