= Joggin Bridge, Nova Scotia =

Locality in Nova Scotia, Canada

Coordinates: 44°36′1.77″N 65°44′13.95″W

Joggin Bridge in Nova Scotia

Joggin Bridge is a locality in the Canadian province of Nova Scotia, located in the Municipality of the District of Digby in Digby County.
