= Hampton, Nova Scotia =

Community in Nova Scotia, Canada

Coordinates: 44°54′13.66″N 65°20′55.46″W

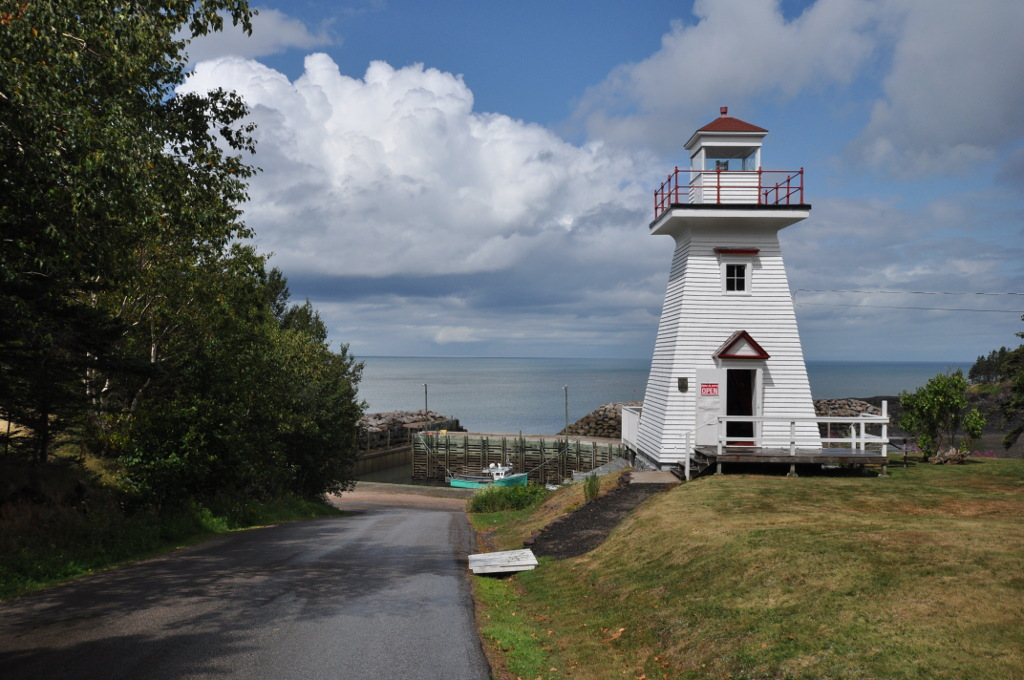
Hampton Lighthouse

Hampton in Nova Scotia

Hampton is a community in the Canadian province of Nova Scotia, located in Annapolis County. It overlooks the Bay of Fundy and a lighthouse was built here in 1911.
