= West Paradise =

Coordinates: 44°51′20.2″N 65°13′4.2″W

West Paradise in Nova Scotia

West Paradise is a community in the Canadian province of Nova Scotia, located in Annapolis County. It is located in the Annapolis Valley along Nova Scotia Route 201 across the Annapolis River from Paradise.

The Evergreen United Baptist Church is a municipally designated heritage building. Constructed c.1857-1859 it was originally a multi-purpose building known as The Central School House, but was dedicated in 1887 and henceforth used solely as a place of worship.
