= Port Lorne =

Community in Nova Scotia, Canada

Coordinates: 44°56′54.67″N 65°15′54.51″W

Port Lorne in Nova Scotia

Port Lorne is a community in the Canadian province of Nova Scotia, located in Annapolis County on the shore of the Bay of Fundy. Originally known as Marshall's Cove, it was officially named as Port Williams in 1874, and then renamed Port Lorne in 1879 after the newly appointed Governor General, the Marquis of Lorne.
