= Upper Clements Parks =

Defunct theme park in Nova Scotia, Canada

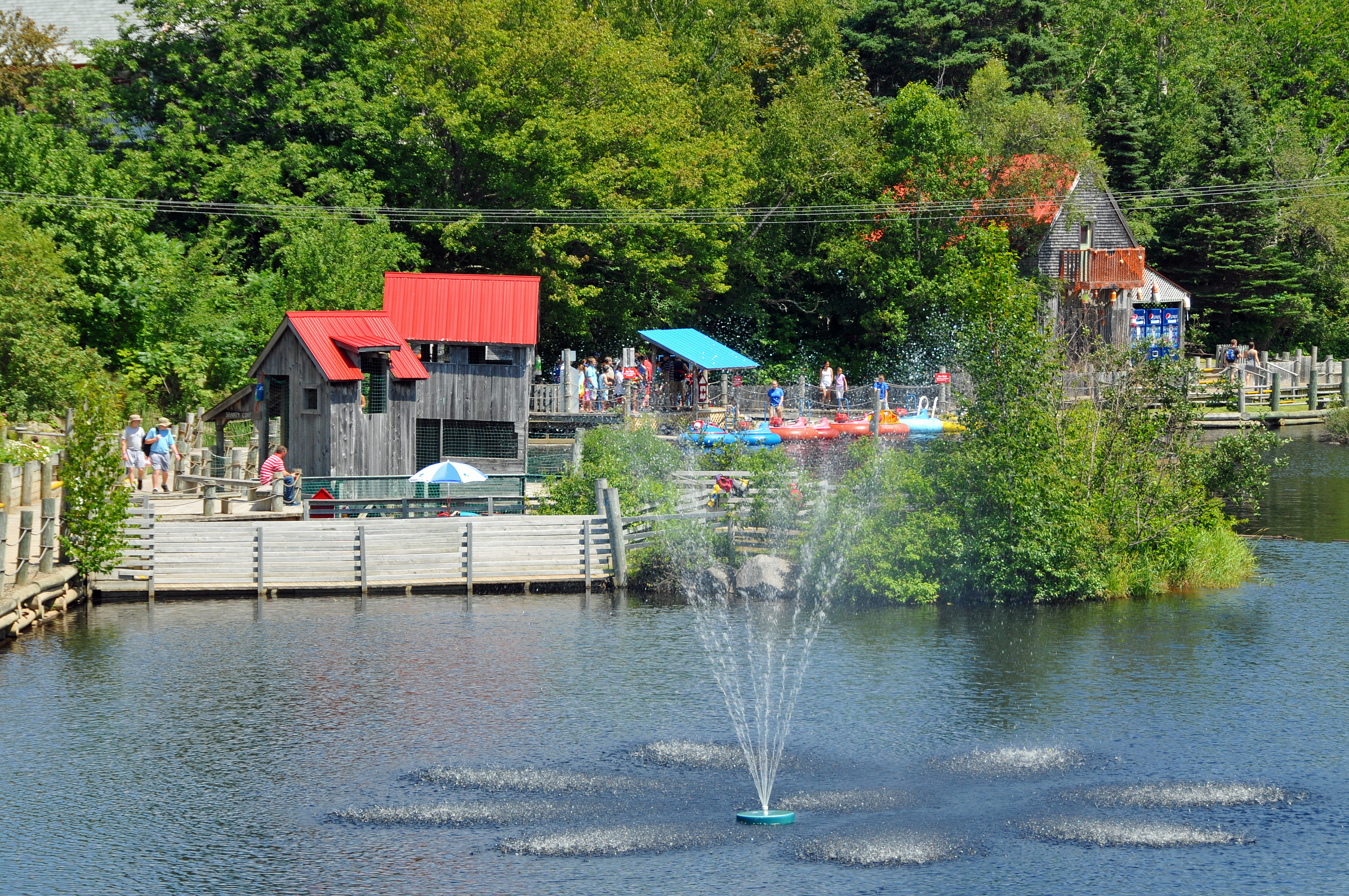
- The pond near the centre of Upper Clements Parks
- Interactive map of Upper Clements Parks
- Location: Upper Clements
- Coordinates: 44°42′10.34″N 65°34′8.49″W
- Opened: 1989
- Closed: 2019

Attractions
- Water rides: Waterslide; Flume Ride; Wading Pool; Bumper Boats
- Website: upperclements.ca (Inactive)

Upper Clements Parks was a seasonal theme park located in Upper Clements, Nova Scotia, Canada owned and operated by a non profit community group, The Upper Clements Parks Society. It was composed of two parks; Upper Clements Theme Park and Upper Clements Adventure Park.

Upper Clements Parks was open daily from the beginning of June until the end of September. The park had a wooden coaster and a water coaster and over 40 rides and attractions.

== History ==
Upper Clements Park was built by the province and opened in 1989 at a cost of $23 million. In 1993, in response to rumours that the park might be doomed to closure, a group of local businesses made a bid to run the park. However, a group of 16 businessmen from Hong Kong, under the name Amsdale Resources Management, were awarded a three-year lease instead. The Amsdale businessmen were motivated by fears surrounding the impending 1997 handover of Hong Kong from British to Chinese sovereignty, and their $500,000 investment in the park was a way to enter Canada through an immigration program centred on entrepreneurship. Amsdale made numerous cuts and annual attendance dropped from 90,000 to 70,000. The tunnel connecting the theme park and the wildlife park was also closed at this time.

Notably, CFB Cornwallis, the nearby Canadian Forces base, was decommissioned in 1995, markedly reducing the area population and potential for visitors to the park formerly generated by regularly scheduled recruit graduation ceremonies. Due to the closure, Royal Canadian Sea Cadet summer training operations at CSTC HMCS Acadia also gradually reduced its presence until its closure in 2021. The cadet summer camp had provided a reliable audience of over 1,000 cadets and staff per year, as in addition to family excursions, cadet course schedules included at least one visit to the park.

Another advertisement for expressions of interest in the park was issued in 1996, and the same group of Annapolis Valley businesses, calling themselves the Hanse Society (after the Hanseatic League), made a second bid for which there was no competition. They were awarded a 10-year lease in 1997. The new operators had to cut the locks to enter the premises. By this time, the park was "ravaged by neglect" with crumbling buildings and numerous missing inventory. The park received $1.37 million in funding from the government in 1998, and a further $1 million in 2003. The tunnel connecting the theme park and the wildlife park was reopened in 2000. Attendance rose to 100,000 in 2006 and the new management turned the park's operating deficit into an annual surplus of nearly $200,000.

In 2007, the theme park was purchased by the non-profit Hanse Society (Upper Clements Parks Society) for $1 million, with the province paying $1.3 million for capital improvements and to fund the transition. In 2007, the society declared the park debt-free. The manager Gregg Gaul stated that Upper Clements generated 200 direct and 200 indirect jobs, and that it drives the local economy.

The park eventually closed after the 2019 season due to falling visitor numbers and a need for significant repairs. In March 2020 the land was purchased by Annapolis County municipal council for $600,000. The intention was to build a $62M boarding school under the Gordonstoun name. The subdivision for the land took place in November 2020, during an election period by the exiting council. In 2021 the sale and lease of the land was overturned by the Nova Scotia Supreme Court, an application brought forth by the newly elected council.

== Description ==
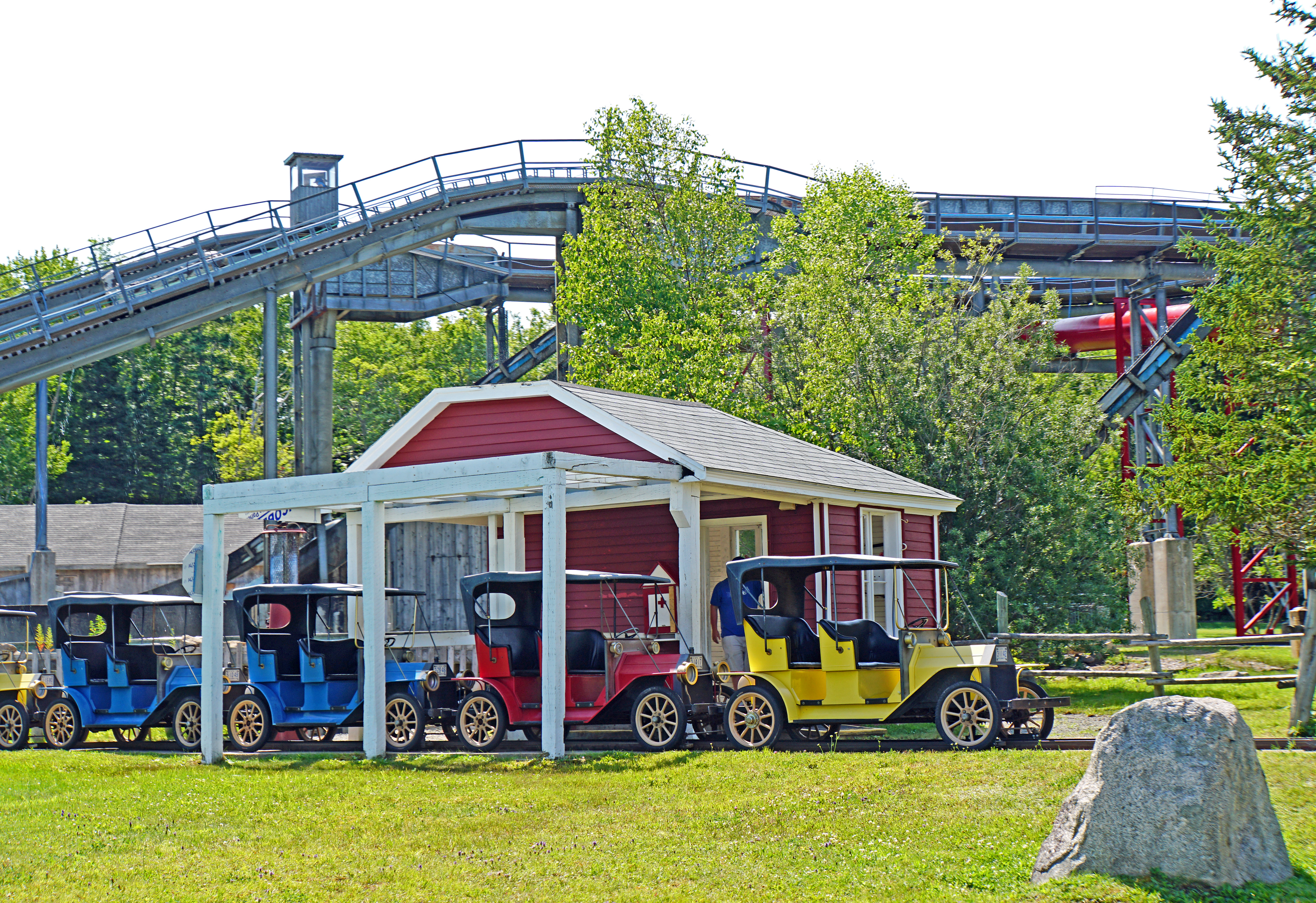
Ride station for the park's antique car ride, in front of the park's log flume.

The Theme Park featured over 30 rides and attractions. In 2012, a new "Adventure Park" was opened, replacing the wildlife park, and featured 2 ziplines and 14 bridges.

The park's mascot was called Clementine, joined by her friends Clarence the train engineer and Captain Kid Ryerson the pirate.
