= Cambridge, Nova Scotia =

Cambridge, Nova Scotia may refer to two places in Canada:

- Cambridge, Hants County, Nova Scotia
- Cambridge, Kings County, Nova Scotia
