= Upper Clements =

Community in Nova Scotia, Canada

Coordinates: 44°41′47″N 65°34′59″W

Upper Clements in Nova Scotia

Upper Clements is a community in the Canadian province of Nova Scotia, located in Annapolis County. It is on Nova Scotia Trunk 1 on the eastern side of the Annapolis Basin. The town is the site of Upper Clements Park and Upper Clements Provincial Park.

Built c.1810, Goat Island Baptist Church is the oldest Baptist church building in Nova Scotia. Its situation overlooks Goat Island. It is a provincially recognised heritage building. As of May 2017 the congregation was looking to sell the building, with two heritage societies interested in looking after it.
