= Annapolis Basin =

Shallow inlet on the east coast of Nova Scotia, Canada

Coordinates: 44°39′N 65°42′W

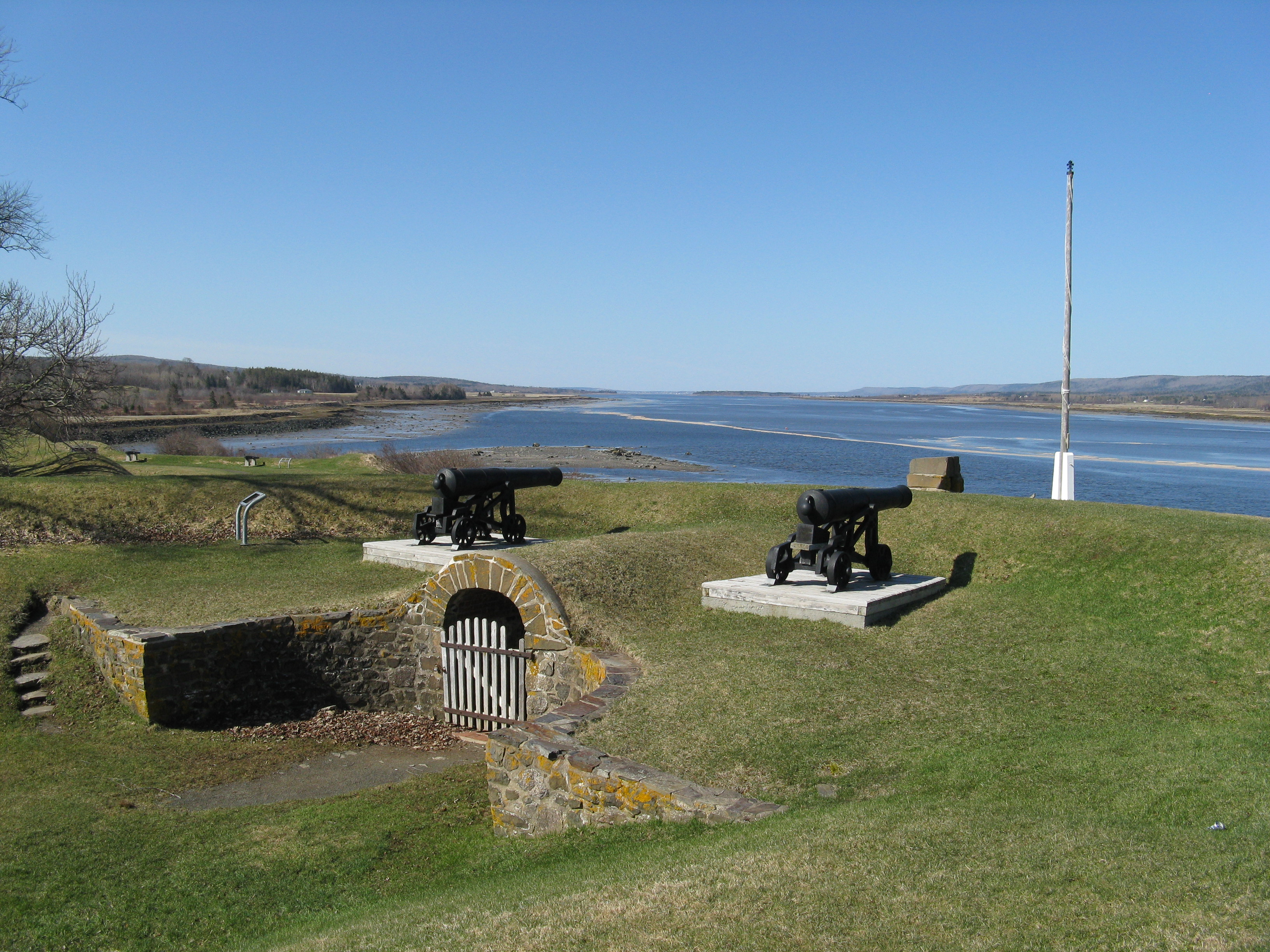
View of Annapolis Basin from Fort Anne, at Annapolis Royal

Annapolis Basin is a substantial basin south of the North Mountain Range of Nova Scotia. The inlet of Digby Gut breaks through the higher ground and connects it to the Bay of Fundy.

The Annapolis Basin is a sub-basin of the Bay of Fundy, located on the bay's southeastern shores, along the northwestern shore of Nova Scotia and at the western end of the Annapolis Valley.

The basin takes its name from the Annapolis River, which drains into its eastern end at the town of Annapolis Royal. The basin measures approximately 24 kilometres (15 mi) northeast-southwest and 6 kilometres (3.7 mi) at its widest from northwest to southeast.

It is a sheltered and mostly shallow water body, framed by the ridges of the North Mountain and South Mountain ranges of the Annapolis Valley; the basin is geologically a continuation of the valley floor. A break in the North Mountain range at the northwestern edge of the basin, called Digby Gut, provides an outlet to the Bay of Fundy.

The Bay Ferries Limited ferry service operating across the Bay of Fundy between Digby and Saint John maintains a terminal on the western shore of the basin near the Digby Gut.

== Rivers ==
Rivers which drain into the basin include:

- Annapolis River
- Bear River
- Moose River

== Islands ==
Two major islands are located in the basin:

- Bear Island
- Goat Island

== Communities ==
The basin hosts several historic seaports, including:

- Towns of Annapolis Royal and Digby
- Village of Bear River
- Communities of Granville Ferry, Port Royal, Port Wade, Victoria Beach, Clementsport, Deep Brook, and Smiths Cove

A former Royal Canadian Navy base and decommissioned Canadian Forces Base is located between Deep Brook and Clementsport on the southeast shore of the basin - see CFB Cornwallis.
