= Paradise, Nova Scotia =

Community in Nova Scotia, Canada

Coordinates: 44°52′11.06″N 65°13′11.98″W

Paradise in Nova Scotia

Paradise is an unincorporated community in the Canadian province of Nova Scotia, located about 30 km (18 mi.) northeast of Annapolis Royal in Annapolis County. The original French name, dating to 1684, was Paradis Terrestre, or Earthly Paradise.

== History ==
Like the rest of Nova Scotia, Paradise was the home of the Mi'kmaq (MicMac) First Nations people before European settlement. Their name for the area was Nesogwaakade (Place of Eel Weirs.)

French settlement of the Annapolis Valley began in the early 17th century. In the 1680s the French government sent officials to survey the area for the presence of timber suitable for shipbuilding. A map produced by one of them, Sieur Lalanne, labels what is now Paradise as Paradis Terrestre. A census compiled in 1687-88 noted that Paradise had 432 inhabitants.

Following the expulsion of the Acadians by the British in the mid-18th century, colonists from New England came to Paradise, followed by Loyalists after the end of the American Revolution. The first church was constructed in 1810, with a one-room schoolhouse being built by 1864, a post office way station in 1868, and a rail line in 1869. There are three properties in Paradise that are listed on the Canadian Register of Historic Places: The Caleb House (c. 1824), the Paradise School (1894), and the Evergreen United Baptist Church (1857) in West Paradise.

== Economy ==
Paradise was, and remains, a rural community. Its economy traditionally focused on land-based enterprises such as logging, fishing, hunting, farming and fruit production. Early business activities included the building of small ships, flour milling, tanning, beaver hat production, and home-based enterprises such as knitting and soft soap making. Today it is primarily residential, with some small tourism-related and service businesses.

== Transportation ==
Major roads through Paradise include Nova Scotia Trunk 1, Nova Scotia Highway 101, and Nova Scotia Route 201.

== Climate ==
This climatic region is typified by large seasonal temperature differences, with warm to hot (and often humid) summers and cold (sometimes severely cold) winters. According to the Köppen Climate Classification system, Paradise has a humid continental climate, abbreviated "Dfb" on climate maps.

== Notable people ==
- Avard Longley (1823-1884). Farmer, merchant and politician
- James Wilberforce Longley (1849-1922). Canadian journalist, lawyer, politician and judge.
- Thomas Freeman Porter (1847-1927). Poet, and later US politician.
- Otto Strasser (1897–1974). German Nazi Party dissident, resident during 1940s and 1950s.
