= Moschelle =

Coordinates: 44°45′11.94″N 65°27′55.69″W

Moschelle in Nova Scotia

Moschelle is a community in the Canadian province of Nova Scotia, located in Annapolis County. It is on the south shore of the Annapolis River, on Nova Scotia Route 201.

St John's Anglican Church was built c.1884 in brick. It is a municipally registered heritage building.
