= Margaretsville =

Human settlement in Nova Scotia, Canada

Coordinates: 45.033°N 65.067°W

Margaretsville (pop. 212) is a Canadian rural community in Annapolis County, Nova Scotia.

Margaretsville in Nova Scotia

Located on the Bay of Fundy, Margaretsville was named for Margaret Inglis by her husband the Honourable Brenton Halliburton, 8th Chief Justice of Nova Scotia. Margaret was the daughter of Bishop Inglis, the first Anglican Bishop of Nova Scotia. When they married her father gave them an estate on the shore which included all the area around where present day Margaretsville sets. This estate sat next to Sir Brenton's father's estate. The Halliburtons had built their summer home in the area in 1802.

Over the years there have been approx. 15 general stores in and around the community of which none now exist. During World War I, Margaretsville had the distinction of setting a record in Nova Scotia by having over 10% of its population enlist for military service and being second in all of Canada.

In 1946, Margaretsville was honored by having a lady in the community with the longest name in Canada: Mrs. Harriett Belle Franklyn Laura Victoria Adeline Drake Gibson.

In a local newspaper dated May 1901, it was stated that a building was sold, in which Mr. Moody of Margaretsville, built the sailing ship Spray in which Capt. Joshua Slocum made his famous solo voyage around the world.

A busy port during the early 1900s, Margaretsville is now a placid seaside community favored by tourists, artists and retirees. There is a small local art gallery owned by the Artist's Circle (Greenwood, Nova Scotia) which sells a variety of art from many local artists. It is called "The Art Shack" and there is always a member of the Artist's Circle on duty to sell art. There is also lively folk music scene.

Some locals refer to the community as ‘Margaretville’ (without an ‘s’) and local road signs are/were inconsistent in their spelling of the name. The official spelling —Margaretsville (and neighboring East Margaretsville) with the ‘s’—was decided by Nova Scotia Geographical Names on April 5, 1951.

An interesting piece of information concerning Margaretsville is the lighthouse which some say appears on the 1967, 5[¢] Canada, stamp. As all lighthouses are unique the picture on the stamp matches very closely the Margaretsville lighthouse.
