= Brickton =

Community in Nova Scotia, Canada

Coordinates: 44°55′12.74″N 65°7′53.1″W

Brickton in Nova Scotia

Brickton is a community in the Canadian province of Nova Scotia, located in Annapolis County. It is on Nova Scotia Trunk 1.
