= Centrelea =

Community in Nova Scotia, Canada

Coordinates: 44°49′14.92″N 65°19′9.17″W

Centrelea in Nova Scotia

Centrelea is a community in the Canadian province of Nova Scotia, located in Annapolis County. It is on Nova Scotia Route 201.

The former Britex (BRIdgetown TEXtiles) factory is located there. Founded in 1960, as branch of United Elastic Limited based in New York, it manufactured elastic textiles used in a large variety of garments produced in other factories in North America. The plant, once a major employer in the area, closed in 2004, and is currently vacant.
