= West Brooklyn, Nova Scotia =

Community in Nova Scotia, Canada

Coordinates: 45°5′1.77″N 64°13′54.88″W

West Brooklyn in Nova Scotia

West Brooklyn is a community in the Canadian province of Nova Scotia, located in Kings County .
