= Nictaux Falls =

Coordinates: 44°54′39″N 65°02′02″W

Nictaux Falls in Nova Scotia

Nictaux Falls is a community in the Canadian province of Nova Scotia, located in Annapolis County on Nova Scotia Route 10, immediately south of Nictaux.
