= Upper Granville =

Coordinates: 44°49′49.99″N 65°20′4.17″W

Upper Granville in Nova Scotia

Upper Granville is a community in the Canadian province of Nova Scotia, located in Annapolis County.

Former premier Stephen McNeil lives in Upper Granville. It is also the birthplace of Joseph Broussard, leader of the Acadians.

Centenary United Church is a provincially recognised heritage building. Built in 1792 in nearby Beaconsfield, and moved to its present location in 1799, it is believed to be the oldest Methodist Church still standing in Canada. Its early Gothic Revival architecture is described as 'exceptional' for a time when other churches in the area were being built in more established styles.
