= Tupperville, Nova Scotia =

Human settlement in Nova Scotia, Canada

Coordinates: 44°47′56.01″N 65°21′55.41″W

Tupperville in Nova Scotia

Tupperville is a community in the Canadian province of Nova Scotia, located in Annapolis County. Before it became known as Tupperville it was once Girouard Village, home of many generations of the Girouard family from 1690 to 1755 starting with Jacques Girouard (b-1648 d-1703) and his wife Marguerite Gautrot Girouard. Jacques was the eldest son of François Girouard and Jeanne Aucoin Girouard. The Girouard's built a number of homes and worked the land which also once belonged to Charles D'Aulnay, Governor of Acadie from 1636 to 1650. Tupperville was named after Asa Tupper who settled here in the late 18th century. Asa Tupper and his siblings accompanied his parents, Elias and Jerusha Tupper, who emigrated to Cornwallis Nova Scotia from Lebanon, Connecticut Colony in 1760.
