= Lequille =

- Community
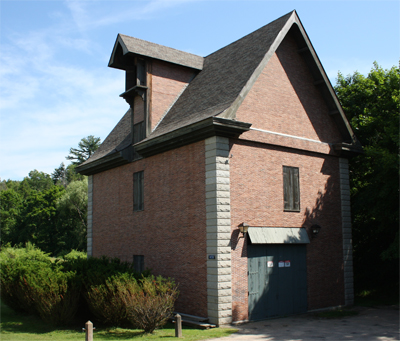
- Lequille hydro plant
- Interactive map of Lequille
- Coordinates: 44°43′40″N 65°29′25″W
- Country: Canada
- Province: Nova Scotia
- County: Annapolis County

Population (2016)
  - Total: 182

Lequille is a community in the Canadian province of Nova Scotia, located in Annapolis County. It is on Nova Scotia Trunk 8 at the foot of the South Mountain, midway between Annapolis Royal to the northwest and Highway 101 (Exit 22) to the south, approximately 3 km (1.9 mi) distant. As of 2021 its population was 182, a decline of 18.0% since 2016.

Lequille is the site of the first water-powered mill to be built north of Mexico. It was constructed in 1607 by Poutrincourt and today a plaque commemorates this National Historic Event. Nearby is the LeQuille Mill which was built in the 1880s to manufacture decorative moldings, casings and door and window frames. It was one of the last mills in the province to be powered by a water turbine, not being converted to electricity until 1960. It is a Provincial Heritage Property. The 13MW Lequille Hydroelectric System on the Allain River was commissioned in 1968 and underwent a $4 million upgrade in 2017.

== Demographics ==
In the 2021 Census of Population conducted by Statistics Canada, Lequille had a population of 182 living in 69 of its 76 total private dwellings, a change of −18% from its 2016 population of 222. With a land area of 0.71 km^{2} (0.27 sq mi), it had a population density of 256.3/km^{2} (663.9/sq mi) in 2021.

== Notable residents ==
- Arthur Kennedy, actor
