= Granville Ferry =

Community in Nova Scotia, Canada

Coordinates: 44°45′26″N 65°30′44″W

Granville Ferry in Nova Scotia

Granville Ferry is a community in the Canadian province of Nova Scotia, located in Annapolis County. Granville Ferry is located directly across the Annapolis River from Annapolis Royal, Nova Scotia. It was the northern terminus for ferries running across the river. Granville Ferry was a major shipbuilding centre in the Golden Age of Sail. The community was also home to the father of Bessie Hall, a notable female mariner in the 19th century. The community is named after John Carteret, 2nd Earl Granville. Its population at the 2021 census was 152, an increase of 38.2% since 2016.

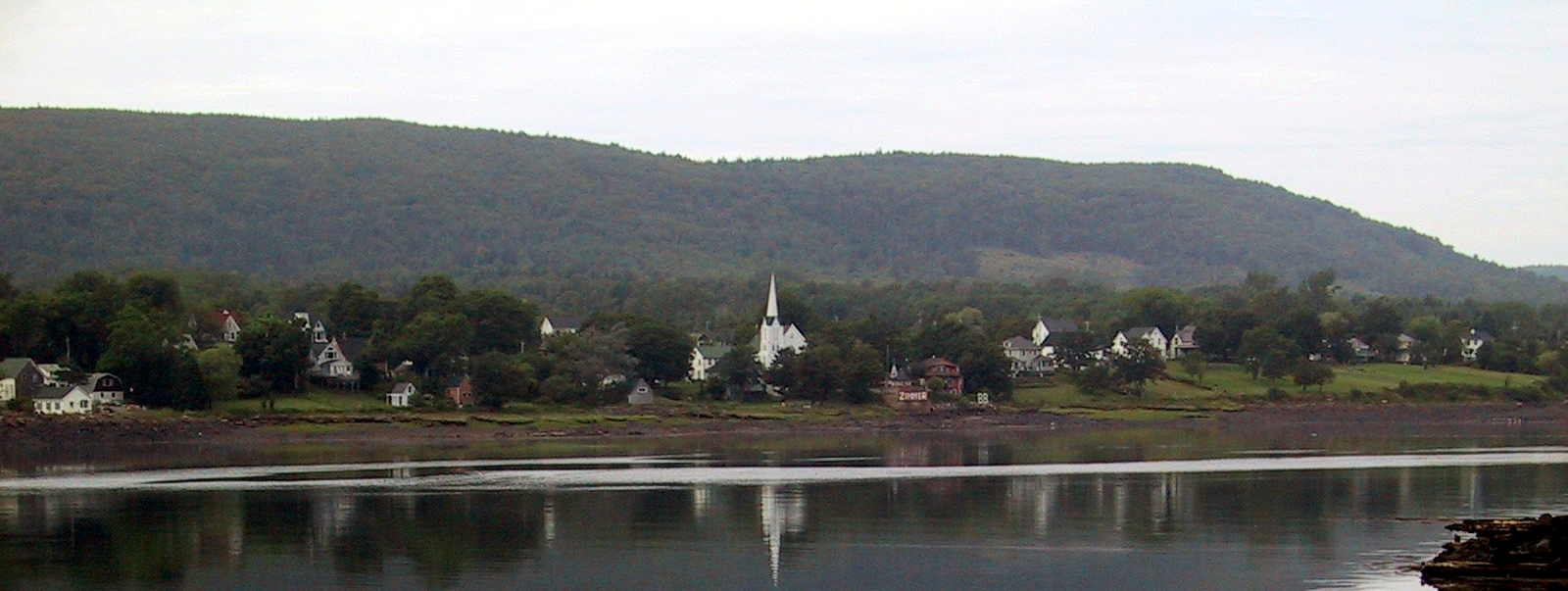
Granville Ferry from Annapolis Royal

== Demographics ==
In the 2021 Census of Population conducted by Statistics Canada, Granville Ferry had a population of 152 living in 74 of its 92 total private dwellings, a change of 38.2% from its 2016 population of 110. With a land area of 0.43 km^{2} (0.17 sq mi), it had a population density of 353.5/km^{2} (915.5/sq mi) in 2021.
