= Lawrencetown, Annapolis County =

Lawrencetown
- Village
- Location of Lawrencetown, Nova Scotia
- Coordinates: 44°52′57″N 65°09′50″W
- Country: Canada
- Province: Nova Scotia
- Municipality: Annapolis County
- Settled: 1760

Government
  - Village Chair: Brian Reid
  - Village Committee: Commissioners of Lawrencetown

Area
  - Total: 5.62 km^{2} (2.17 sq mi)

Population (2021)
  - Total: 636
  - Density: 113.1/km^{2} (293/sq mi)
- Time zone: UTC-4 (AST)
  - Summer (DST): UTC-3 (ADT)
- Postal code: B0S
- Area code: 902
- Telephone Exchange: 584 & 282
- NTS Map: 021A14
- GNBC Code: CATNX

Lawrencetown is a village within Annapolis County in the Annapolis Valley of Nova Scotia, Canada. The village was first settled in 1760 and named after Nova Scotia governor Charles Lawrence. As of 2021 the population was 636, an increase of 23.3% over the previous five years.

Lawrencetown is home to Lawrencetown Consolidated School for grades P-5, and the Centre of Geographic Sciences (COGS), a branch of the Nova Scotia Community College.

The Annapolis Valley Exhibition has been held annually since 1927 at the Lawrencetown Exhibition Grounds and is a week long agricultural event. In 2010, Lawrencetown was nominated as one of the top 12 towns for Kraft Hockeyville, representing eastern Canada in the wildcard category. On March 27, 2010, it was revealed on CBC Hockey Night In Canada that they were voted into the top five towns.

== Demographics ==
In the 2021 Census of Population conducted by Statistics Canada, Lawrencetown had a population of 636 living in 321 of its 354 total private dwellings, a change of 23.3% from its 2016 population of 516. With a land area of 5.62 km^{2} (2.17 sq mi), it had a population density of 113.2/km^{2} (293.1/sq mi) in 2021.
