= Annapolis County =

- County
- Flag Coat of arms
- Motto: Primus et Princeps
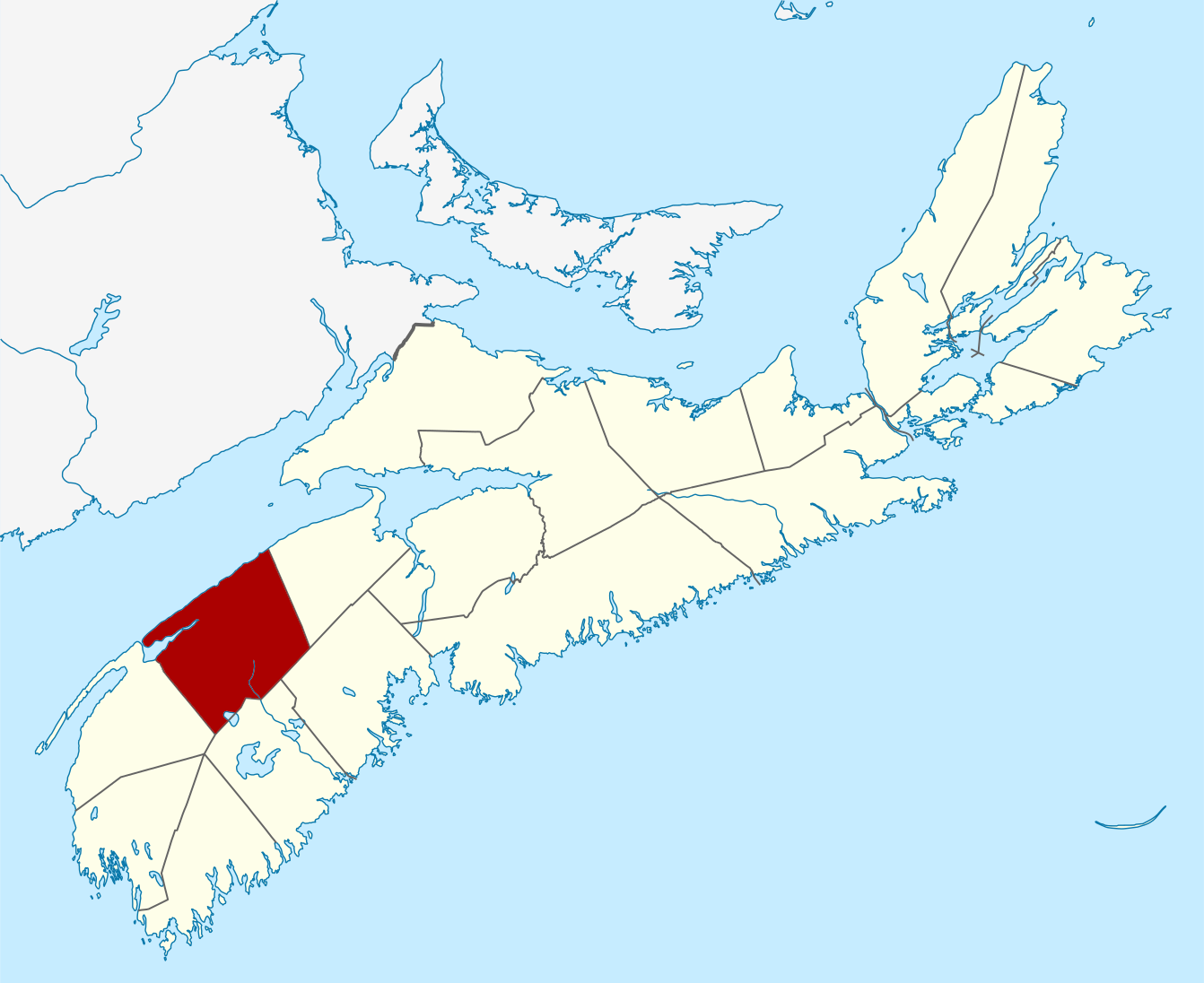
- Location of Annapolis County, Nova Scotia
- Coordinates: 44.7°N 65.2°W
- Country: Canada
- Province: Nova Scotia
- Towns: Annapolis Royal; Middleton
- Established: August 17, 1759
- Incorporated: April 17, 1879
- Named for: Annapolis Royal
- Electoral Districts Federal: West Nova
- Provincial: Annapolis

Government
  - Type: Annapolis County Municipal Council
  - Warden: Diane Leblanc
  - MLA: David Bowlby (PC)
  - MP: Chris d'Entremont (L)

Area
  - Land: 3,183.23 km^{2} (1,229.05 sq mi)

Population (2021)
  - Total: 21,252
  - Density: 6.6762/km^{2} (17.291/sq mi)
  - Change 2006-11: ▲3.2%
  - Census Rankings: Census Divisions; Subdivision A Subdivision B Subdivision C Subdivision D: Towns; Annapolis Royal Middleton: Reserves; Bear River (part) 6 Bear River 6B: 6,342 (574 of 5,008); 3,707 (685 of 5,008); 5,085 (864 of 5,008); 3,007 (987 of 5,008) 444 (3,171 of 5,008); 972 (2,086 of 5,008); 1,829 (1,403 of 5,008) 42 (4,694 of 5,008); 10 (4,889 of 5,008)
- Time zone: UTC-4 (AST)
  - Summer (DST): UTC-3 (ADT)
- Area code: 902
- Dwellings: 11,038
- Median Income*: $37,024 CDN
- Website: annapoliscounty.ca
- Median household income, 2005 (all households)

Annapolis County is a county in the Canadian province of Nova Scotia located in the western part of the province located on the Bay of Fundy. The county seat is Annapolis Royal.

== History ==
Established August 17, 1759, by Order in Council, Annapolis County took its name from the town of Annapolis Royal which had been named in honour of Anne, Queen of Great Britain. The town was the successor to the French settlement of Port Royal, the chief Acadian settlement in the area. The Acadians had been forcibly removed by British government officials in the 1755 Grand Dérangement.

In 1817 the population of the county was 9,817, and that had grown to 14,661 by 1827. At that time, the county was divided into six townships: Annapolis, Granville, Wilmot, Clements, Digby and Clare.

By 1833, a number of reasons had been advanced for making two counties out of Annapolis County. Two petitions were presented to the House of Assembly in that year requesting that the county be divided. However, it was not until 1837 that Annapolis County was divided into two distinct and separate counties - Annapolis and Digby.

== Demographics ==
As a census division in the 2021 Census of Population conducted by Statistics Canada, Annapolis County had a population of 21,252 living in 9,855 of its 11,612 total private dwellings, a change of 3.2% from its 2016 population of 20,591. With a land area of 3,183.23 km^{2} (1,229.05 sq mi), it had a population density of 6.7/km^{2} (17.3/sq mi) in 2021.

Forming the majority of the Annapolis County census division, the Municipality of the County of Annapolis, including its Subdivisions A, B, C, and D, had a population of 18,834 living in 8,608 of its 10,268 total private dwellings, a change of 3.2% from its 2016 population of 18,252. With a land area of 3,172.36 km^{2} (1,224.86 sq mi), it had a population density of 5.9/km^{2} (15.4/sq mi) in 2021.

Population trend

Census	Population	Change (%)
2021	21,252	▲3.2%
2016	20,591	▼0.8%
2011	20,756	▼3.2%
2006	21,438	▼1.5%
2001	21,773	▼2.5%
1996	22,324	▼5.5%
1991	23,630	▲0.2%
1986	23,589	▲4.7%
1981	22,522	N/A
1941	17,692	
1931	16,297	
1921	18,153	
1911	18,581	
1901	18,842	
1891	19,350	
1881	20,598	
1871	18,121	N/A

Mother tongue language (2011)

Language	Population	Pct (%)
English only	19,555	95.58%
French only	450	2.20%
Non-official languages	385	1.88%
Multiple responses	70	0.34%

Ethnic Groups (2006)

Ethnic Origin	Population	Pct (%)
Canadian	9,495	44.9%
English	8,425	39.8%
Scottish	4,935	23.3%
German	3,465	16.4%
Irish	3,385	16.0%
French	3,095	14.6%
Dutch (Netherlands)	1,565	7.4%
North American Indian	1,080	5.1%
Welsh	490	2.3%

== Communities ==
Towns

- Annapolis Royal
- Middleton

Villages

- Bridgetown
- Lawrencetown
- Albany

Reserves

- Bear River 6
- Bear River 6B

County municipality and county subdivisions

- Municipality of the County of Annapolis
  - Annapolis Subdivision A
  - Annapolis Subdivision B
  - Annapolis Subdivision C
  - Annapolis Subdivision D

== Access routes ==
Highways and numbered routes that run through the county, including external routes that start or finish at the county limits:

- Highways
  - Hwy 101
- Trunk Routes
  - Trunk 1
  - Trunk 8
  - Trunk 10
- Collector Routes:
  - Route 201
  - Route 221
  - Route 362
- External Routes:
  - None

== Protected areas ==
- Cottage Cove Provincial Park
- Cloud Lake Wilderness Area
- Delaps Cove Hiking Trails
- Kejimkujik National Park
- Upper Clements Provincial Park
- Valleyview Provincial Park

== Attractions ==
- Bay of Fundy Scenic Drive
- Mount Hanley Schoolhouse Museum
- Annapolis Royal Historic Gardens (Annapolis)
- Fort Anne (Fort Anne National Historic Site)
- Port-Royal National Historic Site
- Upper Clements Park

== See also ==
- List of municipalities in Nova Scotia
- Royal eponyms in Canada
