= List of schools in Nova Scotia =

Nearly all primary and secondary schools in the province of Nova Scotia are public schools maintained by the provincial government's Department of Education. While providing guidelines, the government divides administration of public education over seven regional school districts and one province wide school district serving the province's Acadians.

Post-secondary schools consist of the provincial government operated community college system, Nova Scotia Community College and independently managed universities which receive some public funding. (For a list of post-secondary institutions see List of colleges and universities in Nova Scotia.)

There are seven English-language school districts in Nova Scotia, all created by the Nova Scotia Education Reform Act, 2018:

- Annapolis Valley Regional Centre for Education
- Cape Breton - Victoria Regional Centre for Education
- Chignecto - Central Regional Centre for Education
- Halifax Regional Centre for Education
- South Shore Regional Centre for Education
- Strait Regional Centre for Education
- Tri-County Regional Centre for Education

There is a single province-wide French school district:

- Conseil scolaire acadien provincial

== Description of Nova Scotia public grade schools ==
A high school in Nova Scotia has typically meant a 'senior high school', referring to a school responsible for the education of students grades 10 to (and including) 12 or grades 9 to 12. A junior high school is typically responsible for grades 7 to 9 or grades 6 to 8, where the latter type is more often called a middle school. Some rural high schools combine junior and senior high schools, providing education for grades 7 to 12.

An elementary school is responsible for the education of students from grade kindergarten (usually referred to in Nova Scotia as "grade primary") or grade 1 to grade 5 or 6. A number of Nova Scotian schools combine elementary or the later grades of elementary with junior high or the earlier grades of junior high to form what is referred to as a consolidated school. (Note: The term 'consolidated' is also confusingly used in the naming of a few elementary schools too in the province). Finally, a few schools have all grades from kindergarten to 12.

In summary prominent patterns by which Nova Scotian grade school students attend school are as follows: 1)elementary school, grades pr to 6; junior high school, grades 7 to 9; high school, 10 to 12 2)elementary school, grades pr to 5; middle school, grades 6 to 8; high school, 9 to 12 3)elementary school, grades pr to 6; junior and senior high school 7 to 12 4)consolidated school, grades pr to 9; high school, 10 to 12 5)elementary school, grades pr to 4; consolidated school, grades 5 to 9; high school, grades 10 to 12.

== List of Nova Scotia public grade schools ==
The following are all the public schools in Nova Scotia listed according to the board by which they are managed, and by county. The numbers provided (in parentheses) refer to the grades of each school, where "pr" refers to primary = kindergarten and "to" entails "including". Next to the grades is given the community each school in located in.

=== Annapolis Valley Regional Centre for Education ===
==== Annapolis County ====
- Annapolis East Elementary School (pr to 5); 325 Marshall Street, Middleton
- Annapolis Royal Regional Academy (6 to 8); 590 George Street, Annapolis Royal
- Annapolis West Education Centre (9 to 12); 100 Champlain Drive, Annapolis Royal
- Bridgetown Regional Elementary School (pr to 6); 7 Park Street, Bridgetown
- Bridgetown Regional High School (7 to 12); 456 Granville Street, Bridgetown
- Champlain Elementary School (pr to 5); 109 North Street, Granville
- Clark Rutherford Memorial School (pr to 5); 63 Spinnaker Drive, Cornwallis
- Lawrencetown Consolidated School (pp-pr to 5); 10 Middle Road, Lawrencetown
- Middleton Regional High School (6 to 12); 18 Gates Avenue, Middleton

==== Kings County ====
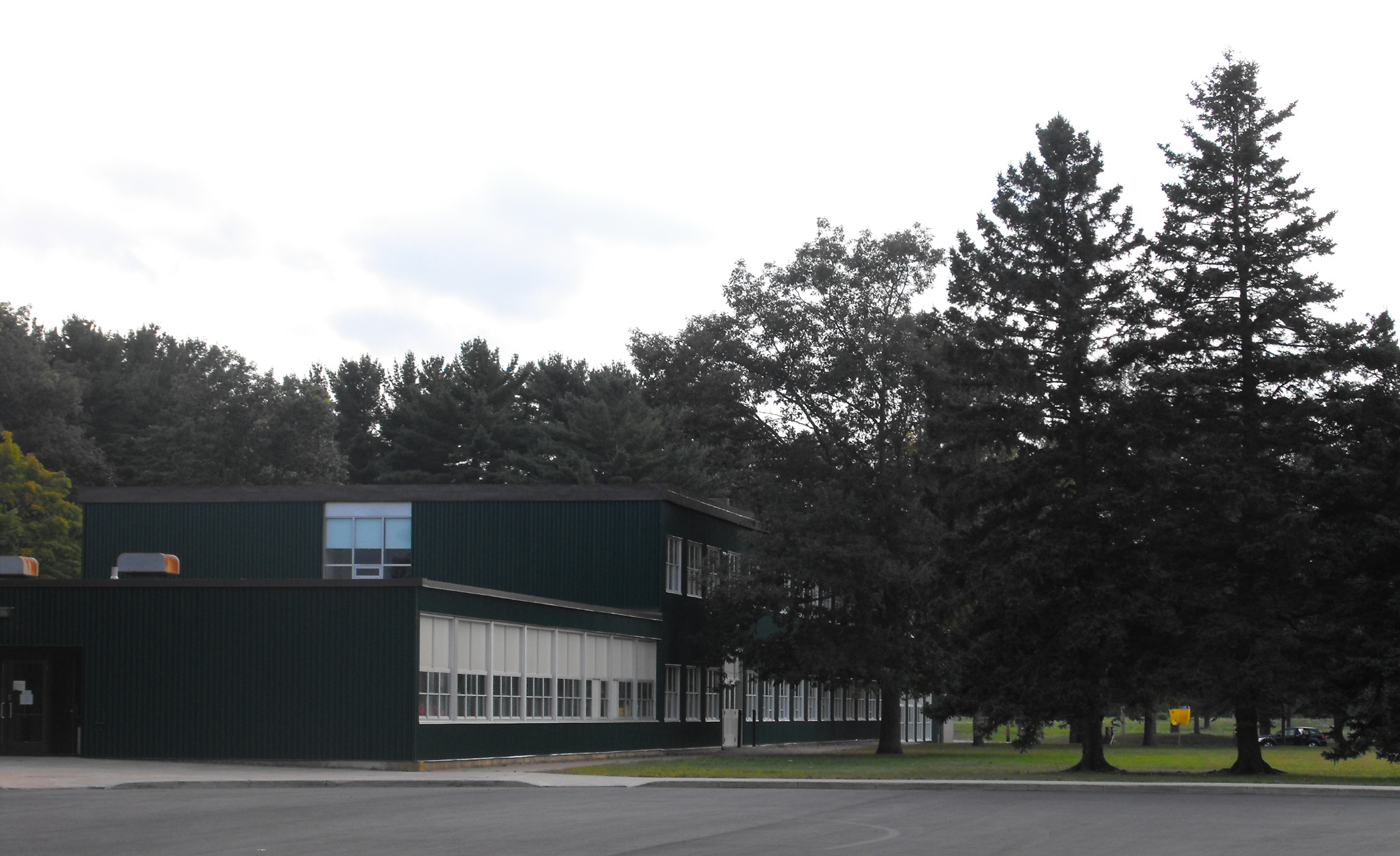
Dwight Ross School in Greenwood

- Aldershot Elementary School (pr to 5); 446 Aldershot Road, Kentville
- Berwick & District School (pr to 9); 220 Veterans Drive, Berwick
- Cambridge & District Elementary School (pr to 6); 6113 Trunk 1, Cambridge Station
- Central Kings Rural High School (7 to 12); Cambridge Station
- Coldbrook & District School (pr to 8); 2305 English Mountain Road, Coldbrook
- Dwight Ross School (pr to 5); Greenwood
- Evangeline Middle School (6 to 8); New Minas
- Gaspareau Valley Elementary School (pr to 5); 2459 Greenfield Road, Wolfville
- Glooscap Elementary School (pr to 5); 1017 J. Jordan Road, Canning
- Hantsport School (pr to 9); 11 School Street, Hantsport
- Highbury Education Centre (10 and 11); 1042 Highbury Road, New Minas
- Horton High School (9 to 12); 75 Greenwich Road South, Wolfville
- Kings County Academy (pr to 5); 25 School Street, Kentville
- Kingston District School (pr to 5); 630 Pine Ridge Avenue, Kingston
- L.E. Shaw Elementary School (pr to 6); 486 Oak Island Road, Avonport
- New Minas Elementary School (pr to 5); 34 Jones Road, New Minas
- Northeast Kings Education Centre (6 to 12); 1816 Bains Road, Canning
- Pine Ridge Middle School (6 to 8); 625 Pine Ridge Avenue, Kingston
- Port Williams Elementary School (pr to 5); 1261 Belcher Street, Port Williams
- Somerset & District Elementary School (pr to 6); 4339 Brooklyn Street, Berwick
- St. Mary's Elementary School (pr to 5); 1276 Victoria Road, Aylesford
- West Kings District High School (9 to 12); 1941 Trunk 1, Auburn
- Wolfville School (pr to 8); 19 Acadia Street, Wolfville

==== West Hants Municipality ====
- Avon View High School (9 to 12); 225 Payzant Drive, Windsor
- Brooklyn District Elementary School (pr to 6); 8008 Trunk 14, Newport
- Dr. Arthur Hines Elementary School (pr to 6); 75 Musgrave Road, Summerville
- Falmouth District Elementary School (pr to 6); 30 School Road, Falmouth
- Newport Station District Elementary School (pr to 6); 1989 Wentworth Road, Newport
- Three Mile Plains School (pr to 5); 4555 Trunk 1, Three Mile Plains
- West Hants Middle School (6 to 8); 8009 Trunk 14, Newport
- Windsor Elementary School (pr to 6); 100 Tremaine Crescent, Windsor
- Windsor Forks District Elementary School (pr to 6); 120 Sangster Bridge Road, Curry's Corner

=== Cape Breton - Victoria Regional Centre for Education ===
==== Cape Breton Regional Municipality ====
- Bras d'Or Elementary School (pr to 5); 10 Alder Point Road, Bras d'Or
- Breton Education Centre (6 to 12); 667 Eighth Street, New Waterford
- Brookland Elementary School (pr to 5); 153 Cottage Road, Sydney
- CBVRSB Adult High (adults only); 290 Whitney Avenue, Sydney
- Coxheath Elementary School (pr to 5); 30 Mount Florence Street, Coxheath
- Cusack Elementary School (p to 5); 500 Birch Hill Drive, Sydney
- Donkin-Gowrie Complex (p to 8); 81 Centre Avenue, Donkin
- Dr. T.L Sullivan School (p to 8); 256 Park Road, Florence
- Glace Bay Elementary School (p to 5); 135 Brookside Street, Glace Bay
- Glace Bay High School (9 to 12); 201 Reserve Street, Glace Bay
- Greenfield Elementary School (pr to 5); 25 James Street, New Waterford
- Harbourside Elementary School (pr to 5); 15 Church Street, Sydney
- John Bernard Croak V.C. Memorial School (pr to 5); 10 Second Street, Glace Bay
- Jubilee Elementary School (pr to 5); 755 Main Street, Sydney Mines
- Malcolm Munroe Middle School (6 to 8); 125 Kenwood Drive, Sydney River
- Marion Bridge Elementary School (pr to 5); 3845 Gabarus Highway, Marion Bridge
- Memorial Senior High School (9 to 12); 80 Memorial Drive, Sydney Mines
- Mountainview Elementary School (p to 5); 21 Delta Drive (6295), Howie Centre
- Oceanview Education Centre (6 to 8); 60 Wallaces Road, Glace Bay
- Riverside Elementary School (pr to 5); 7430 Hornes Road, Albert Bridge
- Riverview Rural High School (10 to 12); 57 Coxheath Road, Coxheath
- Robin Foote Elementary School (pr to 5); 125 Sunnydale Drive, Westmount
- Seton Elementary School (pr to 5); 25 Wilkie Dr, North Sydney
- Sherwood Park Education Centre (6 to 8); 500 Terrace Street, Sydney
- Shipyard Elementary School (pr to 5); 30 Mount Kemmel, Sydney
- St. Anne's Elementary School (pr to 5); 108 Main Street, Glace Bay
- Sydney Academy (9 to 12); 49 Terrace Street, Sydney
- Sydney Mines Middle School (6 to 8); 596 Main Street, Sydney Mines
- Sydney River Elementary School (pr to 5); 35 Phillips Street, Sydney River
- Tompkins Memorial Elementary School (pr to 5); 60 Main Street, Reserve Mines
- Whitney Pier Memorial Middle School (6 to 8); 199 Jamieson Street, Sydney

==== Victoria County ====
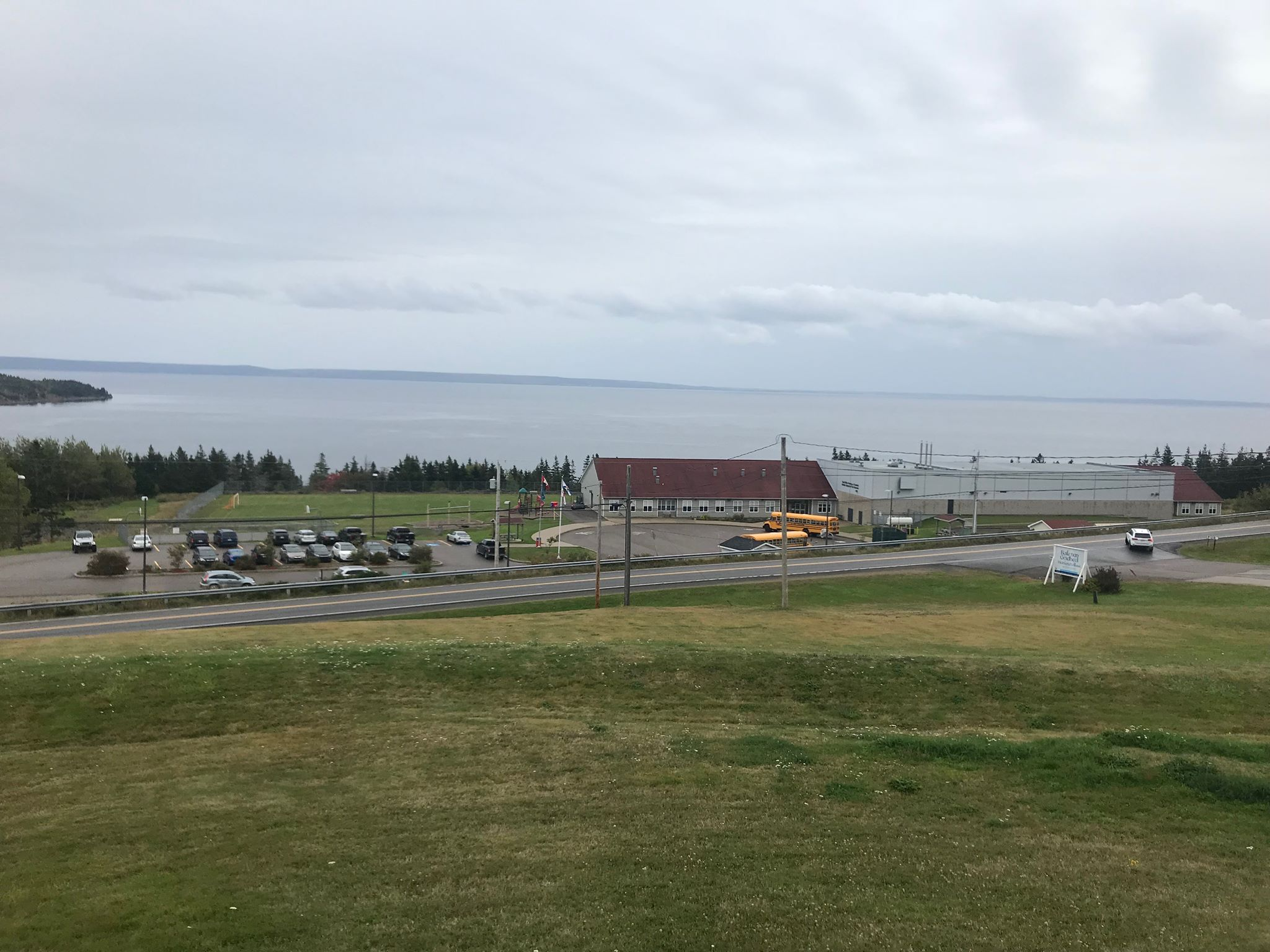
Rankin School of the Narrows in Iona

- Baddeck Academy (pr to 12); Post Office Box 310, Baddeck
- Boularderie Elementary School (pr to 6); 12065 Kempt Road, Boularderie Island
- Cabot Education Centre (7 to 12); 32039 Cabot Trail, Neil's Harbour
- Cape Smokey Elementary School (pr to 6); 39 Brandon Lane, Ingonish
- Middle River Consolidated School (pr to 6); 2248 Cabot Trail, Middle River
- North Highlands Elementary School (pr to 6); 1363 Bay Street Lawrence, Aspy Bay
- Rankin School of the Narrows (pr to 12); 4144 Highway 223, Iona

=== Chignecto-Central Regional Centre for Education ===
==== Pictou County (Celtic) ====
- A.G. Baillie Memorial School (pr to 6); New Glasgow
- Acadia Street School (pr to 6); New Glasgow
- Adult High School - New Glasgow Area (adults only); New Glasgow
- Dr. W.A. MacLeod Elementary School (pr to 6); Stellarton
- East Pictou Middle School (7 to 9); Thorburn
- F.H. MacDonald Elementary School (pr to 6); Thorburn
- G.R. Saunders Elementary School (pr to 5); Stellarton
- Highland Consolidated Middle School (7 to 8); Westville
- New Glasgow Junior High School (7 to 9); New Glasgow
- North Nova Education Centre (10 to 12); New Glasgow
- Northumberland Regional High School (9 to 12); Westville
- Pictou Academy (7 to 12); Pictou
- McCulloch Education Centre (pr to 6); Pictou
- River John Consolidated School (pr to 9); River John
- Salt Springs Elementary School (pr to 5); Salt Springs
- Scotsburn Elementary School (pr to 5); Scotsburn
- Temperance Street School (pr to 6); New Glasgow
- Thorburn Consolidated School (pr to 9); Thorburn
- Trenton Elementary School (pr to 4); Trenton
- Trenton Middle School (5 to 9); Trenton
- Walter Duggan Consolidated School (pr to 6); Westville
- West Pictou Consolidated School (pr to 8); Outside of Pictou

==== Cumberland County (Chignecto) ====
- Advocate District School (pr to 12); Advocate Harbour
- Amherst Regional High School (9 to 12); Amherst
- Cumberland North Academy (pr to 6); Brookdale
- Cyrus Eaton Elementary School (pr to 6); Pugwash
- E.B. Chandler Junior High School (7 to 8); Amherst
- Junction Road Elementary School (pr to 6); Springhill
- Northport Consolidated Elementary School (pr to 6); Northport
- Oxford Regional Education Centre (pr to 12); Oxford
- Parrsboro Regional Elementary School (pr to 6); Parrsboro
- Parrsboro Regional High School (7 to 12); Parrsboro
- Pugwash District High School (7 to 12); Pugwash
- River Hebert District School (P to 12); River Hebert
- Springhill Junior/Senior High School (7 to 12); Springhill
- Spring Street Academy (pr to 6); Amherst
- Wallace Consolidated Elementary School (pr to 6); Wallace
- Wentworth Consolidated Elementary School (pr to 6); Wentworth
- West End Memorial School (pr to 6); Springhill
- West Highlands Elementary School (pr to 6); Amherst

==== Central and Northern Colchester County (Cobequid) ====
- Adult High School - Truro Area (10 to 12); Salmon River
- Alice Street Elementary School (pr to 5); Truro **CLOSED**
- Bass River Elementary School (pr to 3); Bass River
- Bible Hill Central Elementary School (pr to 4); Bible Hill
- Bible Hill East Court Road Elementary School (pr to 4); Bible Hill
- Bible Hill Junior High School (8 to 9); Bible Hill
- Central Colchester Junior High School (6 to 9); Truro
- Chiganois Elementary School (pr to 5); Masstown
- Cobequid Consolidated Elementary School (pr to 5); Old Barns
- Cobequid Educational Centre (9 to 12); Truro
- Debert Elementary School (pr to 6); Debert
- Douglas Street Elementary School (pr to 5); Truro
- Great Village Elementary School (pr to 4); Great Village
- Harmony Heights Elementary School (pr to 5); Salmon River
- North Colchester High School (7 to 12); Tatamagouche **CLOSED**
- North River Elementary School (pr to 6); North River
- Princess Margaret Rose Elementary School (pr to 5); Truro
- Redcliff Middle School (5 to 7); Truro
- Brookfield Memorial Elementary School (pr to 6); Brookfield
- Salmon River Elementary School (pr to 4); Salmon River **CLOSED**
- St. Mary's Elementary School (pr to 5); Truro
- Tatamagouche Elementary School (pr to 6); Tatamagouche
- Truro Junior High School (5 to 8); Truro
- Valley Elementary School (pr to 4); Salmon River
- West Colchester Consolidated School (4 to 9); Bass River
- Willow Street Elementary School (pr to 5); Truro

==== East Hants Municipal District and southern Colchester County (Nova) ====
- Adult High School - Elmsdale Area (adults only); Elmsdale
- Cobequid District Elementary School (pr to 6); Noel
- Elmsdale District Elementary School (pr to 5); Elmsdale
- Enfield District Elementary School (pr to 5); Enfield
- Hants East Rural High School (9 to 12); Milford Station
- Hants North Rural High School (9 to 12); Kennetcook
- Hilden Elementary School (pr to 6); Hilden
- Kennetcook District Elementary School (pr to 6); Kennetcook
- Maitland District Elementary School (pr to 6); Maitland
- Maple Ridge Elementary School (pr to 5); Lantz
- Rawdon District Elementary School (pr to 6); Upper Rawdon
- Riverside Education Centre (6 to 8); Milford
- Shubenacadie District Elementary School (pr to 5); Shubenacadie
- South Colchester Academy (7 to 12); Brookfield
- Uniacke District School (pr to 9); Mount Uniacke
- Upper Stewiacke Elementary School (pr to 6); Upper Stewiacke
- Winding River Consolidated Elementary School (pr to 6); Stewiacke

=== Halifax Regional Centre for Education - Halifax Regional Municipality ===
==== Eastern Shore - Musquodoboit Valley ====
- Dutch Settlement Elementary School (pr to 6) Dutch Settlement
- Musquodoboit Valley Education Centre (pr to 6); 12046 Route 224, Middle Musquodoboit
- Oyster Pond Academy (pr to 9); Jeddore Oyster Ponds
- Upper Musquodoboit Consolidated School (pr to 6); 8416 Route 224, Upper Musquodoboit
- Marine Drive Academy (pr to 12); 481 Church Point Road, Sheet Harbour
- Musquodoboit Rural High School (7 to 12); 11976 Route 224, Middle Musquodoboit
- Eastern Shore District High School (10 to 12); Musquodoboit Harbour

Former Schools in the Eastern Shore - Musquodoboit Valley Region:

- Sheet Harbour Consolidated School (pr to 6); 479 Church Point Road, Sheet Harbour
- Lakefront Consolidated Elementary School (pr to 6); 17286 Marine Dr, Tangier
- Eastern Consolidated Elementary School (pr to 6); 28875 Marine Dr, Moser River
- Musquodoboit Elementary School; 7962 Nova Scotia Trunk 7, Musquodoboit Harbour
- Jeddore Lakeville School; 47 E Jeddore Rd, Head of Jeddore
- Robert Jamison School; 10583 Highway 7, Oyster Pond
- Harbourside School; Owls Head

==== Waverley - Fall River - Beaver Bank - Bedford ====
- Ash Lee Jefferson Elementary School (pr to 6); 10 Lockview Rd, Fall River
- Basinview Drive Community Elementary School (pr to 6); 273 Basinview Dr, Bedford
- Beaver Bank-Kinsac Elementary School (pr to 6); 28 Kinsac Rd, Kinsac
- Beaver Bank-Monarch Drive Elementary School (pr to 6); 1 Monarch Dr, Beaver Bank
- Holland Road Elementary School (pr to 6); 181 Holland Rd, Fletchers Lake
- Lake Charles Academy (private grade primary); 955 Waverley Rd, Waverley
- Oldfield Consolidated School (pr to 6)
- Sunnyside Elementary School (Eaglewood Drive) (pr to 6); 210 Eaglewood Dr, Bedford
- Sunnyside Elementary School (Fort Sackville) (pr to 6); 21 Perth St, Bedford
- Sunnyside Elementary School (Waverley Road) (pr to 6); 18 Scotia Dr, Bedford
- Waverley Memorial - L. C. Skerry Elementary School (Waverly Memorial) (pr to 6); 15 School St, Waverley
- Waverley Memorial - L. C. Skerry Elementary School (L.C. Skerry) (pr to 6); 1279 Rocky Lake Dr, Waverley
- Bedford South School (pr to 6); 2 Oceanview Dr, Bedford
- Broad Street PP-8 School, 50 Broad St, Bedford
- Rocky Lake Elementary School (5 to 6); 426 Rocky Lake Dr, Bedford
- Rocky Lake Junior High School (6 to 9); 670 Rocky Lake Dr, Bedford
- Georges P. Vanier Junior High School (7 to 8); 1410 Fall River Dr, Fall River
- Harold T. Barrett Junior High School (7 to 9); 862 Beaverbank Rd, Beaver Bank
- Lockview High School (9 to 12); 148 Lockview Rd, Fall River
- Charles P Allen High School (10 to 12); 200 Innovation Dr, Bedford
- West Bedford High School, 50 Broad St, Bedford

==== Preston - Lawrencetown - Chezzetcook ====
- Atlantic View Elementary School (pr to 6); 3391 Marine Dr, Upper Lawrencetown
- Bell Park Academic Centre (pr to 6)
- Lakeview Consolidated School (Lakeview) (pr to 6); 5261 Trunk 7, Dartmouth ***CLOSED***
- Lakeview Consolidated School (West Chezzetcook) (pr to 6); 7045 Route 207, West Chezzetcook ***CLOSED***
- Nelson Whynder Elementary School (pr to 6); Lake Major Rd & Cain St, North Preston
- O'Connell Drive Elementary School (pr to 6); Porters Lake
- Porters Lake Elementary School (P-6); (40 Inspiration Drive, Porters Lake, Nova Scotia)
- Gaetz Brook Junior High School (7 to 9); 6856 Trunk 7, Head of Chezzetcook
- Graham Creighton Junior High School (7 to 9); 72 Cherry Brook Rd, Cherry Brook

==== Cole Harbour - Woodside - Eastern Passage ====
- Astral Drive Elementary School (pr to 6); 236 Astral Dr, Dartmouth
- Caldwell Road Elementary School (pr to 6); 280 Caldwell Rd, Dartmouth
- Colby Village Elementary School (pr to 6); 92 Colby Dr, Dartmouth
- Colonel John Stuart Elementary School (pr to 6); 5 John Stewart Dr, Dartmouth
- George Bissett Elementary School (pr to 6); 170 Arklow Dr, Dartmouth
- Humber Park Elementary School (pr to 6); 5 Smallwood Ave, Dartmouth
- Joseph Giles Elementary School (pr to 6); 54 Gregory Dr, Dartmouth
- Ocean View Elementary School (pr to 3); 51 Oceanview School Rd, Eastern Passage
- Robert Kemp Turner Elementary School (pr to 6); 141 Circassion Dr, Dartmouth
- Seaside Elementary School (4 French Immersion, 4 to 5); 1881 Caldwell Rd, Eastern Passage
- Sir Robert Borden Junior High School (7 to 9); 16 Evergreen Dr, Dartmouth
- South Woodside Elementary School (pr to 6); 5 Everette St, Dartmouth
- Southdale-North Woodside School (pr to 6); 36 Hastings Dr, Dartmouth
- Horizon (previously Tallahassee) Community School (pr to 4); 168 Redoubt Way, Eastern Passage
- Astral Drive Junior High School (7 to 9); 238 Astral Dr, Dartmouth
- Eastern Passage Education Centre (6 to 8); 93 Samual Daniel Dr, Eastern Passage
- Island View High School (9 to 12); 1853 Caldwell Rd, Eastern Passage
- Cole Harbour District High School (10 to 12); 2 Chameau Cres, Dartmouth

==== East Dartmouth - The Lakes - Portland - East Woodlawn ====
- Admiral Westphal Elementary School (pr to 6); 6 Fourth St, Dartmouth
- Auburn Drive High School (10 to 12); 300 Auburn Dr, Dartmouth
- Bel Ayr Elementary School (pr to 6); 4 Bell St, Dartmouth
- Brookhouse Elementary School (pr to 6); 15 Christopher Ave, Woodlawn, Dartmouth
- Ian Forsyth Elementary School (pr to 6); 22 Glencoe Dr, Dartmouth
- Michael Wallace Elementary School (pr to 6); 24 Andover St, Port Wallace, Dartmouth
- Mount Edward Elementary School (pr to 6); 3 Windward Ave, Dartmouth
- Portland Estates Elementary School (pr to 6); 45 Portland Hills Dr, Portland Estates, Dartmouth
- Prince Andrew High School (10 to 12); 37 Woodlawn Rd, Woodlawn, Dartmouth
- Ross Road School (pr to 9); 336 Ross Road, Westphal, Dartmouth
- Caledonia Junior High School (7 to 9); 38 Caledonia Rd, Westphal, Dartmouth
- Ellenvale Junior High School (7 to 9); 88 Belle Vista Dr, Woodlawn, Dartmouth
- Eric Graves Memorial Junior High School (7 to 9); 70 Dorothea Dr, Woodlawn, Dartmouth

==== Dartmouth Centre - Albro Lake- Harbourview ====
- Alderney School (pr to 6); 2 Penhorn Dr, Dartmouth
- Crichton Park School (pr to 6); 49 Lyngby Ave, Dartmouth
- Harbour View Elementary School (pr to 6); 25 Alfred St, Dartmouth
- Hawthorn Elementary School (pr to 6); 10 Hawthorne, Dartmouth
- John MacNeil Elementary School (pr to 6); 62 Leamon Dr, Dartmouth
- Bicentennial School (pr to 9); 85 Victoria Rd, Dartmouth
- John Martin Junior High School (7 to 9); 7 Brule St, Dartmouth
- Dartmouth High School (10 to 12); 95 Victoria Rd, Dartmouth

==== Clayton Park West - Fairview - Clayton Park - Rockingham - Wentworth ====
- Burton Ettinger School (pr to 6); 52 Alex St, Halifax
- Duc d'Anville Elementary School (pr to 6); 12 Clayton Park Dr, Halifax
- Fairview Heights School (pr to 6); 210 Coronation Ave, Halifax
- Grosvenor-Wentworth Park Elementary School (pr to 6); 4 Downing St, Halifax
- Rockingham Elementary School (pr to 6); 31 Tremont Dr, Halifax
- Park West School (pr to 9); 206 Langbrae Dr, Halifax*Clayton Park Junior High School (7 to 9); 45 Plateau Cr, Halifax
- Fairview Junior High School (7 to 9); 155 Rosedale Ave, Halifax
- Halifax West High School (10 to 12); 283 Thomas Raddall Dr, Halifax
- Clayton Park Junior High (7 to 9); 45 Plateau Crescent, Halifax

==== North End Halifax - Downtown Halifax ====
- Joseph Howe Elementary School (pr to 6); 2557 Maynard St, Halifax
- Saint Mary's Elementary School (pr to 6); 5614 Morris St, Halifax
- St. Catherine's Elementary School (pr to 6); 3299 Connolly St, Halifax
- St. Joseph's - Alexander McKay Elementary School (pr to 6); 5389 Russell St, Halifax
- St. Stephen's Elementary School (pr to 6); 3669 Highland Ave, Halifax
- St. Patrick's - Alexandra School (pr to 9); 2277 Maitland St, Halifax
- Highland Park Junior High School (7 to 9); 3479 Robie St, Halifax
- Citadel High School (10 to 12); 1855 Trollope St, Halifax
- Ecole Oxford School (pr to 9); 6364 North St, Halifax

==== Northwest Arm - South End - Connaught - Quinpool ====
- Inglis Street Elementary School (pr to 6); 5985 Inglis St, Halifax
- LeMarchant-St. Thomas Elementary School (pr to 6); 6141 Watt St, Halifax
- Sir Charles Tupper School (pr to 6); 1930 Cambridge St, Halifax
- Westmount Elementary School (pr to 6); 6900 Edward Arab Ave, Armdale
- Oxford School (pr to 9); 6364 North St, Halifax
- Halifax Central Junior High School (7 to 9); 1787 Preston St, Halifax
- Gorsebrook Junior High School (7 to 9); 5966 South St, Halifax
- St. Agnes Junior High School (7 to 9); 6981 Mumford Rd, Armdale

==== Purcell's Cove - Armdale - Spryfield - Herring Cove ====
- Central Spryfield School (pr to 6); 364 Herring Cove Rd, Spryfield
- Chebucto Heights Elementary School (pr to 6); 230 Cowie Rd, Armdale
- Harrietsfield Elementary School (pr to 6); 1150 Old Sambro Rd, Harrietsfield
- John W. MacLeod - Fleming Tower Elementary School (Fleming Tower) (pr to 6); 25 Randolph St, Armdale
- John W. MacLeod - Fleming Tower Elementary School (John W MacLeod) (pr to 6); 159 Purcells Cove Rd, Armdale
- Sambro Elementary School (pr to 6) Sambro
- Springvale Elementary School (pr to 6); 92 Downs Ave, Halifax
- William King Elementary School (pr to 6); 91 St. Paul Ave, Herring Cove
- Elizabeth Sutherland School (pr to 9); 66 Rockingstone Rd, Halifax
- Rockingstone Heights School (pr to 9); 1 Regan Dr, Halifax
- Cunard Junior High School (7 to 9); 121 Williams Lake Rd, Spryfield
- Herring Cove Junior High (7 to 9); 7 Lancaster Dr, Herring Cove
- J.L.Ilsley High School (10 to 12); 38 Sylvia Ave, Spryfield

==== Timberlea - Prospect - Hammonds Plains - St. Margaret's ====
- Atlantic Memorial - Terence Bay Elementary School (pr to 5); 3591 Prospect Rd, Shad Bay
- Beechville Lakeside Timberlea Elementary School (pr to 5); 24 James St, Timberlea
- East St. Margarets Elementary School (pr to 6); 8671 Peggys Cove Rd, Indian Harbour
- Hammonds Plains Consolidated School (pr to 5); 2180 Hammonds Plains Rd, Upper Hammonds Plains
- Kingswood Elementary School (pr to 6); 34 Vrege Ct, Kingswood Subdivision, Upper Hammonds Plains
- Prospect Road Elementary School (pr to 6); 2199 Prospect Rd, Prospect
- Shatford Memorial Elementary School (pr to 6); 10089 St. Margaret's Bay Rd, Hubbards
- St. Margaret's Bay Elementary School (pr to 6); 24 Ridgewood Dr, Head of St Margarets Bay
- Tantallon Elementary School (pr to 6); 1 French Village Station Rd, Upper Tantallon
- Brookside Junior High School (6 to 9); 2239 Prospect Rd, Prospect
- Madeline Symonds Middle School (6 to 9); 290 White Hills Rd, Upper Hammonds Plains
- Ridgecliff Middle School (6 to 9); 35 Beech Tree Run, Beechville
- Tantallon Junior High School (7 to 9); 3 French Village Station Rd, Upper Tantallon
- Bay View High School (HRM) (10 to 12); 31 Scholars Rd, Upper Tantallon, Nova Scotia

==== Middle & Upper Sackville - Lucasville - Lower Sackville ====
- Caudle Park Elementary School (pr to 6); 35 Magee Dr, Lower Sackville
- Gertrude M. Parker Elementary School (pr to 6); 100 Stokil Dr, Lower Sackville
- Harry R. Hamilton Elementary School (pr to 6); 40 Hamilton Dr, Middle Sackville
- Hillside Park Elementary School (pr to 6); 15 Hillside Ave, Lower Sackville
- Millwood Elementary School (pr to 6); 190 Beaverbank Cross Rd, Lower Sackville
- Newbridge Academy (pr to 9); 409 Glendale Dr, Lower Sackville
- Sackville Heights Elementary School (pr to 6); 1225 Old Sackville Rd, Middle Sackville
- Smokey Drive Elementary School (pr to 6); 241 Smokey Dr, Lower Sackville
- Sycamore Lane Elementary School (pr to 6); 69 Sycomore Ln, Lower Sackville
- Cavalier Drive School (pr to 9); 116 Cavalier Dr, Lower Sackville
- A.J. Smeltzer Junior High School (7 to 9); 46 Prince St, Lower Sackville
- Leslie Thomas Junior High School (7 to 9); 100 Metropolitan Ave, Lower Sackville
- Sackville Heights Junior High School (7 to 9); 956 Sackville Dr, Lower Sackville
- Millwood High School (10 to 12); 141 Millwood Dr, Lower Sackville
- Sackville High School (10 to 12); 1 King Fisher Way, Lower Sackville

=== South Shore Regional Centre for Education ===
==== Lunenburg County ====
- Aspotogan Consolidated Elementary School (pr to 5); Hubbards
- Bayview Community School (pr to 9); Mahone Bay
- Big Tancook Elementary School (pr to 5); Big Tancook Island
- Bluenose Academy (pr to 9); Lunenburg
- Bridgewater Elementary School (pr to 6); Bridgewater
- Bridgewater Junior High School (7 to 9); Bridgewater
- Chester Area Middle School (6 to 9); Chester
- Chester District Elementary School (pr to 5); Chester
- Forest Heights Community School (10 to 12); Chester
- Gold River-Western Shore Elementary School (pr to 5); Western Shore
- Hebbville Academy (pr to 9); Bridgewater
- Lunenburg Adult High School (adults only); Bridgewater
- Mahone Bay Centre (alternate and transition); Mahone Bay
- New Germany Elementary School (pr to 6); New Germany
- New Germany Rural High School (7 to 12); New Germany
- New Ross Consolidated School (pr to 9); New Ross
- Newcombville Elementary School (pr to 4); Bridgewater
- Park View Education Centre (10 to 12); Bridgewater
- Pentz Elementary School (pr to 6); LaHave
- Petite Rivière Elementary School (pr to 6); Petite Rivière
- South Shore Alternate School (10 to 12); Bridgewater
- Verge House Transition Program School (10 to 12); Bridgewater
- West Northfield Elementary School (pr to 6); Bridgewater

==== Region of Queens Municipality ====
- Dr. John C. Wickwire Academy (2 to 6); Liverpool
- Gorham Memorial Education Centre (adult, transition and alternate); Liverpool
- Greenfield Elementary School (pr to 6); Greenfield
- Liverpool Regional High School (10 to 12); Liverpool
- Mill Village Consolidated Elementary School (pr to 6); Mill Village
- Milton Centennial School (pr to 1); Milton
- North Queens Elementary School (pr to 6); Caledonia (destroyed by fire 2006-09-14)
- North Queens Community High School (7 to 12); Caledonia
- Queens Adult High School (adults only); Liverpool
- South Queens Junior High School (7 to 9); Liverpool

=== Strait Regional School Board ===
==== Inverness County ====
- Pleasant Bay School (pr to 6); Pleasant Bay
- Cape Breton Highlands Education Centre/Academy (pr to 12); Terre Noire
- Inverness Academy (pr to 12); Inverness
- Dalbrae Academy (9 to 12); Southwest Mabou
- Bayview Education Centre (pr to 8); Port Hood
- Whycocomagh Education Centre (pr to 8); Whycocomagh
- SAERC (9 to 12); Port Hawkesbury
- Tamarac Education Centre (pr to 8); Port Hawkesbury

==== Richmond County ====
- East Richmond Education Centre (pr to 8); St. Peter's
- Felix Marchand Education Centre (pr to 4); Louisdale
- Richmond Academy (9 to 12); Louisdale

==== Antigonish County ====
- East Antigonish Education Centre/Academy (pr to 12); Monastery
- Rev. H.J. MacDonald School (pr to 6); Heatherton
- St. Andrew's Consolidated School (pr to 6); St. Andrew's
- Dr. J.H. Gillis Regional School (9 to 12); Antigonish
- Antigonish Education Centre (pr to 4); Antigonish
- St. Andrew Junior School (5 to 8); Antigonish
- H.M. MacDonald Elementary School (pr to 6); Antigonish

==== Guysborough County ====
- Mulgrave Memorial Education Centre (pr to 8); Mulgrave
- Chedabucto Place (pr to 12); Guysborough
- Fanning Education Centre (pr to 12); Hazel Hill
- St. Mary's Education Centre / Academy (pr to 12); Sherbrooke

=== Tri-County Regional School Board ===
==== Digby County ====
- Barton Consolidated School (pr to 6) *CLOSED*; Barton
- Digby Adult High School (adults only); Digby
- Digby Elementary School (pr to 6); Digby
- Digby Neck Consolidated School (pr to 6); Digby Neck
- Digby Regional High School (7 to 12); Digby
- Islands Consolidated School (pr to 12); Freeport
- St Mary's Bay Academy (7 to 12); Weymouth
- Weymouth Consolidated School (pr to 6); Weymouth

==== Yarmouth County ====
- Carleton Consolidated School (pr to 6); Carleton
- Drumlin Heights Consolidated School (pr to 12); Glenwood
- Maple Grove Education Centre (7 to 8); Hebron
- Meadowfields Community School (pr to 6); Yarmouth
- Plymouth School (pr to 6); Plymouth
- Port Maitland Consolidated Elementary School (pr to 6); Port Maitland
- Yarmouth Adult High School (adults only); Yarmouth
- Yarmouth Central Elementary School (pr to 6); Yarmouth
- Yarmouth Consolidated Memorial High School (9 to 12); Yarmouth

==== Shelburne County ====
- Barrington Municipal High School (7 to 12); Barrington
- Cape Sable Island Elementary School (3 to 6); Cape Sable Island
- Clark's Harbour Elementary School (pr to 3); Clark's Harbour
- Evelyn Richardson Elementary School (pr to 6); Shag Harbour
- Forest Ridge Academy (pr to 6); Barrington
- Hillcrest Academy (pr to 6); Shelburne
- Lockeport Elementary School (pr to 6); Lockeport
- Lockeport Regional High School (7 to 12); Lockeport
- Shelburne Regional High School (7 to 12); Shelburne

=== Conseil scolaire acadien provincial ===
==== Région Nord-Est ====
- Centre scolaire Étoile de l'Acadie (pr to 12); Sydney
- École acadienne de Pomquet (pr to 12); Pomquet
- École Beau-Port (pr to 12); Arichat
- École NDA (pr to 12); Chéticamp

==== Région Centrale ====
- École acadienne de Truro (pr to 12); Truro
- École Beaubassin (pr to 5); Halifax
- École Bois-Joli (pr to 6); Dartmouth
- Centre Scolaire de la Rive-Sud (pr to 12); Blockhouse
- École du Carrefour (7 to 12); Dartmouth
- École Rose-des-Vents (pr to 12); Greenwood
- École secondaire du Sommet (6 to 12); Halifax

==== Région Sud-Ouest ====
- École Belleville (pr to 6); Tusket
- École Jean-Marie-Gay (pr to 6); Saulnierville
- École Joseph-Dugas (pr to 6); Church Point
- École Pubnico-Ouest (pr to 6); West Pubnico
- École Saint-Albert (pr to 6); Salmon River
- École secondaire de Clare (7 to 12); Meteghan River
- École secondaire de Par-en-Bas (7 to 12); Tusket
- École Stella-Maris (pr to 6); Meteghan
- École Wedgeport (pr to 6); Wedgeport

== List of Nova Scotia private schools ==
The following are private schools in Nova Scotia. The numbers provided (in parentheses) refer to the grades of each school, where "pr" refers to primary = kindergarten, “jp” refers to junior primary and "to" entails "including". Next to the grades is given the community in which each school is located.

- Armbrae Academy (pr to 12); Halifax
- Bedford Academy; Bedford, Nova Scotia
- Birch Hills Academy (pr to 7); Bedford
- Bridgeway Academy (ages 5–19)
- Churchill Academy; Dartmouth, Nova Scotia
- Colchester Christian Academy (K4 to 12); Truro, Nova Scotia
- Creative Kids Education Centre (pr to 5); Hammonds Plains, Nova Scotia
- Halifax Christian Academy (pre-pr to 12); Halifax, Nova Scotia
- Halifax Grammar School (pr to 12); Halifax
- Halifax Independent School (pr to 9); Halifax, Nova Scotia
- Harbourview Montessori School (preK to 8); Sydney, Nova Scotia
- Kings View Academy (7 to 12);
- Kings Edgehill School (7 to 12); Windsor
- Kingston Bible College Academy (pr to 12); Freeman Dr, Kingston
- Landmark East School (ages 11–18): Wolfville, Nova Scotia
- Maritime Muslim Academy (pr to 12); Halifax, Nova Scotia
- The Booker School (k to 8); Port Williams, Nova Scotia
- Newbridge Academy (pr to 9); Sackville, Nova Scotia
- Oceanview Christian Academy (pr to 9); Cape Sable Island, Nova Scotia
- Sacred Heart School of Halifax (pr to 12); Halifax
- Sandy Lake Academy (pr to 12); Bedford
- Shambhala School (pr to 12); Halifax
- Silver Crescent Academy (ESL/Child Care/primary to 10); Halifax, Nova Scotia
- South Shore Waldorf School (pr to 6); Blockhouse, Nova Scotia
- Summit Academy of Active Learning (jp to 9);Bedford, Nova Scotia
- Via Vita Academy of Learning (preK to 9), Lower Sackville, Nova Scotia

== See also ==
- List of school districts in Nova Scotia
- List of schools in Canada
