= Annapolis Valley Regional Centre for Education =

School district in Nova Scotia, Canada

Location
- Berwick, Nova Scotia Canada
- Coordinates: 45.04°N 64.74°W

District information
- Regional Executive Director of Education: Dave Jones
- Schools: 40

Students and staff
- Students: 13,041 (2015-16)

Other information
- Mission Statement: To create a supportive student-centred environment with a focus on equity, where each student succeeds and all educational partners are respected and valued
- Website: www.avrce.ca

The Annapolis Valley Regional Centre for Education (AVRCE) (formerly Annapolis Valley Regional School Board) is the public school district responsible for the approximately 40 elementary, middle level, and high schools in Annapolis County, Kings County, and the West Hants Municipal District of Hants County in Nova Scotia, Canada. The school district was renamed following the dissolution of elected school boards and placing in Nova Scotia in March 2018.

== Schools ==
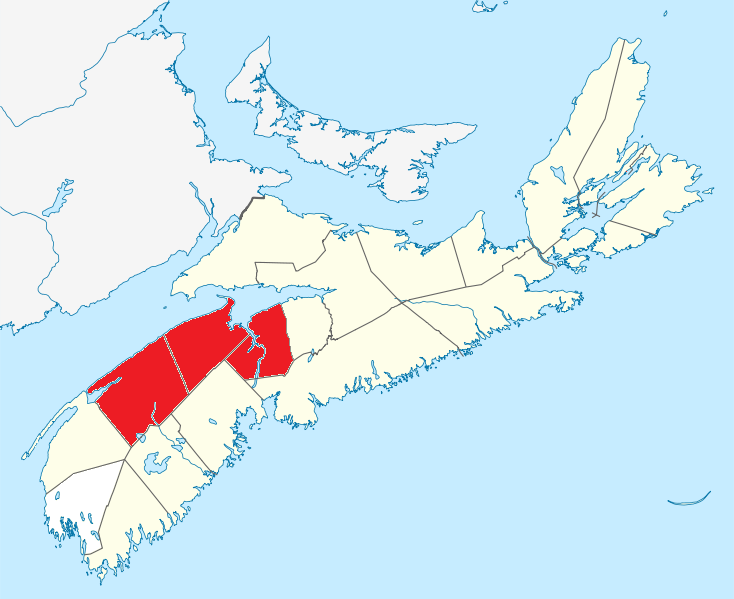
Coverage area for the school board

=== Annapolis County ===
- Annapolis East Elementary School (pr to 5); 325 Marshall Street, Middleton
- Annapolis West Education Centre (6 to 12); 100 Champlain Drive, Annapolis Royal
- Bridgetown Regional Community School (pr to 12); 25 Cromwell Court, Bridgetown
- Champlain Elementary School (pr to 5); 109 North Street, Granville
- Clark Rutherford Memorial School (pr to 5); 63 Spinnaker Drive, Cornwallis
- Lawrencetown Consolidated School (pr to 5); 10 Middle Road, Lawrencetown
- Middleton Regional High School (6 to 12); 18 Gates Avenue, Middleton

=== Kings County ===
- Aldershot Elementary School (pr to 5); 446 Aldershot Road, Kentville
- Berwick & District School (pr to 8); 220 Veterans Drive, Berwick
- Cambridge & District Elementary School (pr to 5); 6113 Trunk 1, Cambridge Station
- Central Kings Rural High School (6 to 12); Cambridge Station
- Coldbrook & District School (pr to 8); 2305 English Mountain Road, Coldbrook
- Dwight Ross Elementary School (pr to 5); Greenwood
- Evangeline Middle School (6 to 8); New Minas
- Gaspareau Valley Elementary School (pr to 5); 2459 Greenfield Road, Wolfville
- Glooscap Elementary School (pr to 5); 1017 J. Jordan Road, Canning
- Hantsport School (pr to 8); 11 School Street, Hantsport
- Highbury Education Centre (10 and 11); 1042 Highbury Road, New Minas
- Horton High School (9 to 12); 75 Greenwich Road South, Wolfville
- Kings County Academy (pr to 8); 35 Gary Pearl Drive, Kentville
- Kingston District School (pr to 5); 630 Pine Ridge Avenue, Kingston
- L.E. Shaw Elementary School (pr to 5); 486 Oak Island Road, Avonport
- New Minas Elementary School (pr to 5); 34 Jones Road, New Minas
- Northeast Kings Education Centre (6 to 12); 1816 Bains Road, Canning
- Pine Ridge Middle School (6 to 8); 625 Pine Ridge Avenue, Kingston
- Port Williams Elementary School (pr to 5); 1261 Belcher Street, Port Williams
- Somerset & District Elementary School (pr to 5); 4339 Brooklyn Street, Berwick
- St. Mary's Elementary School (pr to 5); 1276 Victoria Road, Aylesford
- West Kings District High School (9 to 12); 1941 Trunk 1, Auburn
- Wolfville School (pr to 8); 19 Acadia Street, Wolfville

=== West Hants Municipality ===
- Avon View High School (9 to 12); 225 Payzant Drive, Windsor
- Brooklyn District Elementary School (pr to 5); 8008 Trunk 14, Newport
- Dr. Arthur Hines Elementary School (pr to 5); 75 Musgrave Road, Summerville
- Falmouth District Elementary School (pr to 5); 30 School Road, Falmouth
- Three Mile Plains School (pr to 5); 4555 Trunk 1, Curry's Corner
- West Hants Middle School (6 to 8); 8009 Trunk 14, Newport
- Windsor Elementary School (pr to 5); 100 Tremaine Crescent, Windsor
- Windsor Forks District Elementary School (pr to 5); 120 Sangster Bridge Road, Curry's Corner

=== Recent School Development and Closures ===
- In 1999, Horton High School was built.
- In 2000, Champlain Elementary School was built.
- In 2001, Northeast Kings Education Centre was built as a result of the Kings County Academy High School, in Kentville and Cornwallis District High School, in Canning amalgamating.
- In 2001, Pine Ridge Middle School was built.
- In 2003, Avon View High School was built as a result of Hants West Rural High School in Newport and Windsor Regional High School in Windsor amalgamating.
- In 2004, Springfield Consolidated School, which housed students grades primary to 6, closed, students were moved to either Annapolis East Elementary School or New Germany Elementary School in the South Shore Regional School Board.
- In 2004, Margaretville Consolidated School. which housed students grades primary to 6, closed, students were moved to Annapolis East Elementary School.
- In 2011, Kings County Academy was built.
- In 2015, Annapolis Royal Regional Academy, which housed students grades 6 to 8, closed, students were moved to nearby high school Annapolis West Education Centre.
- In 2015, Newport Station District School, which housed students grades primary to 6, closed with only 67 students enrolling, students were moved to either Brooklyn District Elementary School or Three Mile Plains District School.
- In 2017, The grade primary to 12 Bridgetown Regional Community School was built as a result of Bridgetown Regional Elementary School and Bridgetown Regional High School amalgamating.

== See also ==
- List of Nova Scotia schools
- Education in Canada
