= Anti-bullying =

Anti-bullying may refer to:

- Anti-bullying legislation, with the intent of reducing bullying against students
- Anti-Bullying Day or Pink Shirt day, celebrated on various dates across the world
- Anti-Bullying Week, an annual British event

== See also ==
- Bullying
