= Nova Scotia Secondary School Students' Association =

The Nova Scotia Secondary School Students' Association (known commonly as the NSSSA or as "N-Trip" to its members) is an organization in Nova Scotia, Canada run mainly by students in Grades 9 to 12, enrolled in a Nova Scotia secondary school. Its purpose is to foster growth of leadership skills among youth, primarily through the use of regional and province-wide annual leadership conferences. Every student enrolled in a secondary school in Nova Scotia is considered a member of the NSSSA, and permitted to attend these conferences.

== Organization ==
The Nova Scotia Secondary School Students' Association (NSSSA) is governed by the Provincial Cabinet, which operates under a set of established bylaws. The Provincial Cabinet is composed of an elected president, who is typically a student in their first year of university, along with two elected vice presidents, internal and external (the "Presidential Trio"). The Provincial Cabinet holds overall responsibility for the organization and oversees all activities of both the Conference Committee, which organizes the annual provincial conference held at St. Francis Xavier University (STFX), and the five Regional Cabinets, which coordinate smaller regional conferences primarily for students within their respective areas.

While many positions across the organization are filled by appointment, certain key roles are elected at the Annual General Meeting, held during the provincial conference. Elected positions include the president, vice presidents, and regional co-premiers (the leaders of each Regional Cabinet). Following the election, the Presidential Trio selects the Provincial Conference co-chairs for the following year through an application process. These co-chairs are then responsible for appointing members to the conference committee. similarly, regional co-premiers fill their respective cabinets through applications submitted by interested students.

All committee positions within the NSSSA are held on a one-year term basis. While members often reapply, this structure leads to a relatively high rate of turnover. To maintain continuity, Lorne "Abe" Abramson, the long-serving Provincial Advisor, played a significant role in ensuring organizational consistency.

=== Provincial Cabinet ===
The Provincial Cabinet (PC) of the Nova Scotia Secondary School Students’ Association (NSSSA) serves as the organization's primary governing body, responsible for strategic direction, policy formation, and external relations. PC consists of several key positions, including the president, vice-president external, vice-president internal, and past president, each contributing to the leadership and operational oversight of the association. Regional leadership is also represented by co-premiers and co-advisors from various regions, ensuring localized engagement and support. There are various other positions, all of whom play roles in event coordination, communication, financial management, and digital presence.

=== Conference Committee ===
The Conference Committee (CC) is a key organizational body within the Nova Scotia Secondary School Students' Association (NSSSA), responsible for planning and executing the annual provincial conference. The Conference Committee is led by three Co-Chairs, who are usually university students and also serve as members of the Provincial Cabinet. CC collaborates closely with the Provincial Cabinet to ensure the successful delivery of the largest event hosted by the NSSSA, typically held at St. Francis Xavier University. In recent years, it has had upwards of three hundred attendees.

=== Regional Cabinet ===
There are six regions within the NSSSA, Strait, Cape Breton-Victoria, Chignecto, Metro, and Sou’West Valley. They correspond roughly with different school boards within Nova Scotia. Each region has its own Regional Cabinet, run by two Co-Premiers. The Regional Cabinets host regional conferences, predominantly for their member schools, but open to all. These conferences are on a significantly smaller scale than the Provincial Conference.

== History ==
The NSSSA began as an idea in 1986 among two students at Halifax West High School in Halifax, Nova Scotia. The idea was based on an already established organization in Ontario known as the OSSSA (which has since been retired). The NSSSA was officially registered with the joint stock companies of Halifax in 1992, and the first Provincial Conference was held that same year. Known as L.I.N.K. (Leadership In Nova Scotia Kicks), it was sparsely attended, lasted for one day, and barely resembled the current structure of the NSSSA, but the enthusiasm generated by the conference was carried over to the next year, and conferences have been held every year. As attendance grew, further restructuring of the organization was needed, and the regions were formed shortly thereafter, with regional conferences becoming a reality in the mid-1990s.

== Provincial Conference ==
Every year, the NSSSA holds one four-day province-wide conference for all secondary school students, taking place at St. Francis Xavier University. Conference is always held on the third weekend of May, the weekend coinciding with the national Victoria Day holiday, from Thursday to Sunday.

The Provincial Conference features a wide array of interactive programming, including skillbuilding sessions, keynote speakers, student elections, and social events.

Skillbuilding is the core of the NSSSA experience, where small groups of students led by trained high school facilitators (called Skillbuilders) engage in discussions, games, and leadership challenges that focus on confidence-building, empathy, inclusion, and communication.

Each day also includes keynote speakers (often community leaders, educators, or youth advocates) who speak on topics related to leadership, mental health, activism, and personal growth.

The weekend normally does not follow an absolutely set pattern, but most of the events occur each year. Some of these events include:

- Opening and closing ceremonies, which set the tone for the weekend, explain the rules and general structure of conference, and provide a space for celebration and reflection.
- The Opportunities Fair, where students connect with organizations, post-secondary institutions, and community initiatives.
- A talent show, where students across the province have the opportunity to showcase their unique skills and abilities
- EPIC (Everyone Participates In Conference), a high-energy, surprise, "Amazing Race" type event done with your skillbuilding group, focused on teamwork and spirit.
- Presidential, vice presidential, and co-premier elections, where candidates deliver speeches and delegates vote for the next year’s Provincial Cabinet leadership.
- A Dance
- A Late Night activity (usually Karaoke and a quieter option, such as board games)
- A concluding Barbeque and farewells on Sunday afternoon.

=== Rules ===
At the opening ceremonies, three major rules that are absolute are introduced; these are called the "3D's". The "3D's" are:

- No Drinking
- No Drugs
- No Doing "It" ("it" consisting of any sexual or romantic gestures or activities.

Breaking these rules can result in expulsion from a conference.

=== The Eight Key Concepts ===
Some other rules are introduced as well, known as the "Eight Key Concepts". While they are not grounds for expulsion, they are meant to guide the delegates of the conference to creating a nurturing and positive environment for all. They are as follows:

==== 1. Positive Internal Focus ====
Always strive to maintain an optimistic outlook and emphasize constructive discussion.

==== 2. Speaker in Charge ====
Only one person speaks at a time while others listen. This ensures everyone has an opportunity to contribute.

==== 3. Speak for “I” ====
Participants should speak from personal experience, using statements like “I feel…,” rather than “we feel…,” to avoid making assumptions about others’ thoughts or emotions.

==== 4. Avoid “Killer Statements” ====
Discourage insults, sarcasm, or negative remarks. Even jokes can undermine the group’s sense of safety and trust.

==== 5. Unfinished Business ====
All issues should be addressed fully. If a discussion is interrupted due to time constraints, it should be revisited as soon as possible.

==== 6. Right to Pass ====
Everyone has the choice whether to participate. Recognize that some individuals may feel uncomfortable in certain situations and may prefer silence.

==== 7. Leveling Out ====
To promote equity, each participant should be given equal opportunity to speak. When possible, everyone should be physically on the same level (e.g., seated in a circle).

==== 8. Business, Never Personal ====
Critique ideas, not individuals. Encourage dissenting viewpoints without allowing disagreements to become personal or damage relationships.

=== Beginning of Conference ===
The conference officially begins with delegate arrival. Skillbuilders arrive early to set up a designated table, where delegates get the chance to meet them prior to conference.

Delegates are given a one‑hour grace period to arrive at St. Francis Xavier University (STFX), locate their rooms, check in with their assigned skillbuilders, and take part in the Welcoming Activity. This introductory event, organized by the Welcoming Co‑Chairs, is designed to foster communication and relationship building among participants.

Following the Welcoming Activity, all delegates proceed to dinner. The opening ceremony takes place afterward, during which the Conference Committee introduces themselves and outlines the rules and expectations for the event.

After the opening ceremony, delegates attend their first skillbuilding session.

=== Skillbuilding ===
Participants attend skillbuilding sessions, which are central to the event’s programming. These sessions vary in length from one to three hours, with a total of eight sessions spread across the four days of the conference. Delegates are divided into skillbuilding groups, typically consisting of eight to ten delegates and two facilitators, known as skillbuilders. Each group meets in a designated space separate from others to ensure a focused and intimate environment.

Skillbuilding sessions involve a variety of interactive activities, including games, puzzles, and structured discussions. These activities are designed to promote team bonding, trust, and personal reflection among group members. By the second or third session, groups often develop a strong sense of camaraderie and openness, with participants frequently sharing personal thoughts and experiences in a supportive, peer-driven atmosphere.

The role of the skillbuilders is to facilitate the activities, maintain session flow, and nurture group cohesion. Each session concludes with a "debrief," during which members reflect on the activities and discuss the lessons learned.

The first and final skillbuilding sessions follow a consistent structure each year. During the first session, delegates write their "First Impressions" of each group member on cue cards, capturing their initial perceptions. In the final session, they write "Last Impressions" for each member, reflecting on how their understanding of the person has evolved over the course of the conference. These cards are then given to the respective individuals and are often regarded as meaningful mementos. The final session typically concludes with the skillbuilders offering closing words of encouragement and a reminder to carry forward the lessons learned. Delegates frequently exchange contact information, and it is common for groups to remain in touch long after the event. Many participants cite the skillbuilding sessions as the most impactful and memorable aspect of the conference.

=== Dance ===
Another highly anticipated event during the conference is the Saturday night dance, which is styled similarly to a traditional high school dance. The event typically lasts three hours. A longstanding tradition occurs during the final song (almost always Hey Jude by The Beatles) when attendees form a large circle, place their arms around one another’s shoulders, and sing along.

=== End of Conference ===
The conference concludes with a closing ceremony, which generally includes speeches, a video or slideshow recapping the weekend, and is followed by a barbecue. These ceremonies are often highly emotional, as delegates have formed close bonds and shared meaningful experiences in a short time. Following the closing events, attendees typically depart, marking the official end of the conference. Members of the Conference Committee usually remain for an additional day or two to assist with clean-up and final logistical tasks.

=== Regional conferences ===
Regional conferences are styled after the Provincial Conference, with many of the same activities occurring at both. The major difference is that regional conferences are on a much smaller scale (they can have anywhere from 12 to 500 attendees, depending on the region), and they take place over one night as opposed to three. Activities at regional conferences can vary. For instance, at certain conferences, there may not be a dance, while there may not be a talent show on others, all depending on individual region's resources. Regional cabinet organizes and runs their conference, and PC and CC attend all regional conferences to better assist in planning the Provincial Conference. In the past, regional conferences have occurred in late Winter, although in recent years they have been moved to late Autumn to better space out the conferences with the Provincial Conference. Typically, regional conferences take place at a public high school in the region. There are six of these each year. Metro, Strait, Chignecto, Sou-West, Valley, and Cape Breton-Victoria.

=== Inclusion Conference ===
The inclusion conference was held as a special conference for students with special needs for the first time in 2005; it was called G.O.A.L. The idea proved a success and a second inclusion conference was held in 2006 named G.R.O.W.T.H. The Inclusion Conference Co-Chairs were responsible for organizing and running this conference, which occurred in early April each year.

With dwindling numbers following COVID-19, NSSSA disbanded the inclusion committee and ended the Inclusion Conference program by a vote at its annual general meeting in August, 2023. This was done as part of a change in approach towards accessibility and inclusion for young leaders with disabilities. in September, 2023, NSSSA appointed a volunteer Program Lead, Accessibility whose role is to lead NSSSA's accessibility efforts; consult with regional cabinets, conference committee and provincial cabinet on issues of accessibility; and advocate for participants with disabilities.

=== Conference names ===
Every conference has a different name. The name of a conference is usually an acronym forming a short (usually three to five letters, although it has been as high as nine in the past in the case of one Valley regional conference (Stop Drop n' Roll standing for Students Taking Opportunities and Putting their Dreams Right On Path towards New Realizations On Learning and Leadership) word, with the letters standing for words that create a phrase usually related to leadership. Since 2014, the provincial conference has discontinued the use of acronyms in favour of a simple phrase, starting with Challenging the Status Quo 2014 and ending most recently with Rise Up 2018.

==== Provincial Conference names ====
- 1992 - L.I.N.K. (Leadership In Nova Scotia Kicks)
- 1993 - S.L.I.C.E. (Student Leadership In Constant Evolution)
- 1994 - W.E.T. (We Excel Together)
- 1995 - B.L.A.S.T. (Bringing Leadership And Students Together)
- 1996 - F.L.Y. (Finding Leadership in Yourself)
- 1997 - S.L.A.M. (Student Leaders Achieving More)
- 1998 - W.I.L.D. (Working to Inspire Leadership Development)
- 1999 - J.A.M. (Journey to Achieve Motivation)
- 2000 - H.Y.P.E. (Helping Youth Positively Excel)
- 2001 - S.L.I.D.E. (Students Leading In Diverse Environments)
- 2002 - S.M.A.S.H. (Student Motivation Achieving Spectacular Heights)
- 2003 - C.O.A.S.T. (Confidence in Our Actions Starting Today)
- 2004 - R.E.M.I.X. (Redirecting Energy and Motivation Into X-cellence)
- 2005 - J.U.M.P. (Journey to Understand My Potential)
- 2006 - E.D.G.E. (Every Day Grab an Experience)
- 2007 - A.G.E.N.T. (Achieving Goals and Empowering Nova (Scotian) Teens)
- 2008 - S.T.O.R.M. (Students Teaching Others to Reach and Motivate)
- 2009 - P.O.W.E.R. (Providing Opportunities While Encouraging Responsibility)
- 2010 - B.E.Y.O.N.D. (Bringing Enthusiastic Youth Opportunities and New Directions)
- 2011 - O.N.E. (Offering Navigation to Empowerment)
- 2012 - F.O.R.W.A.R.D. (Finding Opportunities to Rediscover What Adolescents can Really Do)
- 2013 - R.E.V.I.V.E. (Realizing Everyone's Values In Various Environments)
- 2014 - Challenging the Status Quo
- 2015 - Taking Charge
- 2016 - Exceeding Expectations
- 2017 - Reaching New Heights
- 2018 - Rise Up
- 2019 - Synergy
- 2020 - Vision
- 2021 - Refresh
- 2022 - Sky's The Limit
- 2023 - Ride The Wave
- 2024 - Boogie
- 2025 - Lights, Action, Leadership
- 2026 - Turn It Up

== Past presidents and vice-presidents ==
Year	President	President's School	Vice-President, Internal	Vice-President, Internal's School	Vice-President, External	Vice-President, External's School
1992	Mark Fraser	HW	Graham Forsythe	HW		
1993	Tyler Hayden	PVEC	Jennifer Milbury	PA		
1994	Dave Brien	CPA	Seth Rose-Rudenski	QEH		
1995	Chris Webb	St.P	Renee Pelletier	CARR		
1996	Liz Dipchand	Hfx.W	Joey Archibald (abdicated)	HaW		
1997	Darren Smith	CPA	Shelley Banks	AUB		
1998	Caleb Wheeldon	HORT	Matt Woo	AUB		
1999	Neeti Tomar	HW	Jess De Mello	CH		
2000	Tyson R. Hubley	CPA	Joyce Silver	DHS		
2001	Brennan Dempsey	JLI	Marc-Antoine Robertson	QEH		
2002	Andrew Arbuckle	AMH	Laura Decker	LOCKP		
2003	Kelsey Tonner	SJA/Acad.	MacKenzie Marshall	AMH		
2004	MacKenzie Masrshall	AMH	Jill Fraser	LOCKV		
2005	Ty Walsh	CKRH/SMU	Ian Arbuckle	AMH		
2006	Heather MacDonald	CEC/ACAD	Chris Saulnier	DHS/Dal		
2007	Noah Logan	SJA/NSCAD	Shawna-Lynn Brake	SHS/SMU		
2008	Shawna-Lynn Brake	SHS/SMU	Sam Durnford	PV/Dal		
2009	Sam Durnford	PVEC	Matt LeMoine	CPA/StFX		
2010	Matt LeMoine	CPA/StFX	Evan Kennedy	CEC		
2011	Evan Kennedy	CEC	Rebecca Jordan	BHS	Chris Gordon	SJA
2012	Emma Bartlett	LHS/Dal	Jessica Gravel	BRHS	Emma Beaton	PVEC
2013	Gillian MacKenzie (resign)	NRHS/MSVU	Tiffany Holmberg	SAERC/MSVU	Quinn MacIsaac	SHS/Dal
2014	Quinn MacIsaac	SHS/Dal	Erinn Musial	LHS/StFX	Molly Marcott	NRHS
2015	Holly Davy	CHS/Dal	Stephen Wentzell	BCHS	Lachlan Topshee	CHS
2016	Maggie MacNeil	RSN	Meagan Kettley	EAA/GA	Micci Davy	CHS
2017	Molly Anderson	MTA	Katelyn Libbus	RHS	Liam Haliburton	SRHS
2018	Zac Foran	JHG	Amy Oickle	BJSHS	Mullen Boutler	NRHS
2019	Eliza Nobes	LHS			Rebecca MacKeen	GA
2020	Abby Fraser	RHS/StFX			Angus Kennedy	JHG
2021	Reya Hanspal	RHS	Tessa Pelrine	JHG	James Reeves	SMA
2022	Noor Mohrez	GA	Audrey Yang	JHG	Mairinn Kennedy	JHG
2023	Jack Kuzyk	JHG	Autumn Atkinson	BRCS	Amy MacKay	EAA
2024	Kate MacLean	RHS			Sadie Beaver	GA
2025	Marguerite Sherlock	IVHS/Dal	Jonathan (JJ) Paisley	IVHS	Annabel Webber	BRCS
2026	Erin MacNeil	AUB/MSVU	Aiden MacDonald	MHS/MSVU	Abby Billard	MHS/MSVU
2027	Nicole (Coco) Kucharski	BRCS	Gabe Cook	DrJHG	Kaleigh Farmer	LHS/MSVU

== Cheers ==
=== The Cheer Bible ===
While there are many cheers and rituals of NSSSA, WENDYs are the only ones who know all of them, through a book passed from one WENDY to another known as the 'Cheer Bible.' As they each receive it, in turn, they are permitted to create and add their own cheers.

=== Popular cheers ===
Spirit War: A classic at NSSSA, students are split in two groups as the cheer goes on. It's usually done in a public place, when one or more students stands and yells out 'We've got spirit, yes we do! We've got spirit, how 'bout you?' The other students will then argue the same cheer back, and as the cheer continues, more and more students get involved, making each side appear to have 'more spirit.' Finally, when the students don't think it will get any louder, they all begin hopping, and yelling 'We got the most!' repeatedly.

Repeat After Me Cheers: These are all too common at NSSSA, and can be about many things. WENDYs usually initiate these, but any student can, really. They usually are not just words spoken aloud, but also actions to match the cheer. Some common repeat after me cheers are 'Little Red Wagon,' 'Hey Hey Superman,' and 'I was Eaten by a Boa Constrictor.'
