= International Day of Pink =

Annual anti-bullying and anti-homophobia event

International Day of Pink Journée rose
- Type: International
- Significance: Anti-Bullying
- Frequency: Annual
- First time: 2007; 18 years ago
- Started by: Jer's Vision
- Related to: Anti-Bullying Day; International Stand Up to Bullying Day

The International Day of Pink is a worldwide anti-bullying and anti-homophobia event held annually during the second week of April. Though similar to Pink Shirt Day (held in February) in that it also seeks to end all bullying, the Day of Pink is more specifically aimed towards anti-LGBTQ+ bullying.

The event was sparked when a gay Canadian high-school student was witnessed by two fellow students as being bullied at their school for wearing a pink shirt. The two students got everyone at their school to wear pink the following day as a gesture of support, inspiring Jer's Vision (now Canadian Centre for Gender and Sexual Diversity) to establish the International Day of Pink.

In 2012, over 8 million people participated. It is run by youth volunteers in Ottawa, Ontario, Canada.

== History ==
The Day of Pink was sparked in 2007 when students David Shepherd and Travis Price saw a student being bullied for wearing a pink shirt in their Central Kings Rural High School in Nova Scotia, Canada. Shepherd and Price decided to show support for the student by getting everyone at their school to wear pink the following day.

This initiative inspired some youth at Jer's Vision (now Canadian Centre for Gender and Sexual Diversity), who thereby founded International Day of Pink, an effort to support their peers internationally with resources and ways to make their schools safer.

== Events ==
In 2012, students participating the Day of Pink organized numerous flash mobs, including one on Parliament Hill. The International Day of Pink also shares a Gala with JersVision.org and the event has featured comedian Rick Mercer, Brian Burke of the Toronto Maple Leafs, and former Canadian ambassador Stephen Lewis.

== See also ==
- Jer's Vision
- School Bullying
- International STAND UP to Bullying Day
