= Central Kings Rural High School =

Coordinates: 45.058776°N 64.631340°W

Location
- 6125 Highway 1 Cambridge, Nova Scotia; Canada

Information
- Type: High School
- Motto: Nobilia Petentes (Seek the Noble Way)
- Established: 1952
- Principal: Michael Mason
- Grades: 6-12
- Enrollment: 700
- Colors: Green and white
- Mascot: Gator
- Website: Central Kings Rural High School

Central Kings Rural High School (CKRHS), commonly locally referred to as just "CK", is a secondary school located in Cambridge, Kings County, Nova Scotia, Canada. It serves students from grades 6 to 12. CK's students come from the Somerset, Cambridge, Waterville, Coldbrook and North/South Alton areas of Kings County. Students from Somerset District Elementary School and Cambridge District Elementary School feed into the school at grade 6, while students at Coldbrook District School feed into the school at grade 9.

== History ==
Central Kings Rural High School was built in 1952. It began as a junior high school with nineteen classrooms. A senior high school was added in 1962. The school was created as part of a province-wide movement to create rural high schools. Previously students in rural areas of Kings County had to board away from home or travel long distances by train to complete high school at the Kings County Academy in Kentville.

== "Pink Shirt" Anti-Bullying Day ==
In September 2007, Central Kings students David Shepherd and Travis Price bought and distributed pink shirts to fellow students, after grade nine student Charles McNeill was bullied for wearing a pink shirt during the first day of school. Many students responded to their gesture and the idea spread. The practice became an annual awareness event called Anti-Bullying Day (a.k.a. Pink Shirt Day). It is held on the last Wednesday of February or the second Thursday in September in Canada and for the International Day of Pink on the second Wednesday of April, and have given the idea with the T-shirts for the International STAND UP to Bullying Day. The school has placed a strong emphasis on stopping bullies and by-standers who enable bullies.

== See also ==
- List of schools in Nova Scotia
