= List of school districts in Nova Scotia =

There are 8 school districts in the province of Nova Scotia, Canada.

== Current school districts ==
School district	Headquarters	Sector	Enrollment (2015-16)	Teachers (2014–15)	Student-teacher ratio (2014-15)	French enrollment (2011–12)	Graduation rate (2015-16)	Withdrawal rate (2015–16)
Annapolis Valley Regional Centre for Education	Berwick	Anglophone	13,041	952	14.6	7,279 (51.5%)	92.7%	3.2%
Cape Breton - Victoria Regional Centre for Education	Sydney	Anglophone	13,004	1,041	12.8	6,937 (47.8%)	89.5%	3.9%
Chignecto-Central Regional Centre for Education	Truro	Anglophone	19,967	1,506	13.9	11,057 (51.2%)	83.7%	1.7%
Conseil scolaire acadien provincial	Dartmouth	Francophone	5,474	445	12.1	4,771 (100%)	81.7%	0.4%
Halifax Regional Centre for Education	Dartmouth	Anglophone	47,975	3,629	14.0	27,115 (54.6%)	93.8%	3.2%
South Shore Regional Centre for Education	Bridgewater	Anglophone	6,471	530	12.6	3,516 (49.8%)	95.2%	3.9%
Strait Regional Centre for Education	Port Hastings	Anglophone	6,304	540	12.1	3,638 (52.1%)	91.2%	1.5%
Tri-County Regional Centre for Education	Yarmouth	Anglophone	5,916	508	12.4	3,755 (55.3%)	89.6%	4.8%

== Historical enrollment by district ==
School district	Headquarters	Sector	2005-06	2006-07	2007-08	2008-09	2009-10	2010-11	2011-12	2012-13	2013-14	2014-15	2015-16
Annapolis Valley Regional School Board	Berwick	Anglophone	16,259	15,936	15,466	15,239	14,895	14,496	14,141	13,579	13,395	13,142	13,041
Cape Breton - Victoria Regional School Board	Sydney	Anglophone	17,882	17,068	16,418	16,006	15,479	15,084	14,522	13,839	13,622	13,278	13,004
Chignecto-Central Regional School Board	Truro	Anglophone	24,415	23,912	23,279	22,823	22,397	21,994	21,611	21,050	20,593	20,238	19,967
Conseil scolaire acadien provincial	Dartmouth	Francophone	4,153	4,124	4,257	4,358	4,446	4,634	4,771	4,934	5,109	5,280	5,474
Halifax Regional School Board	Dartmouth	Anglophone	54,389	53,283	52,524	51,993	51,281	50,370	49,651	49,079	48,742	48,311	47,975
South Shore Regional School Board	Bridgewater	Anglophone	8,371	8,160	7,903	7,712	7,510	7,334	7,065	6,852	6,680	6,491	6,471
Strait Regional School Board	Port Hastings	Anglophone	8,584	8,245	7,888	7,631	7,390	7,281	6,988	6,816	6,628	6,488	6,304
Tri-County Regional School Board	Yarmouth	Anglophone	8,251	7,933	7,568	7,372	7,152	6,938	6,791	6,494	6,259	6,155	5,916
