= École Rose-des-Vents =

Coordinates: 44.960571°N 64.944443°W

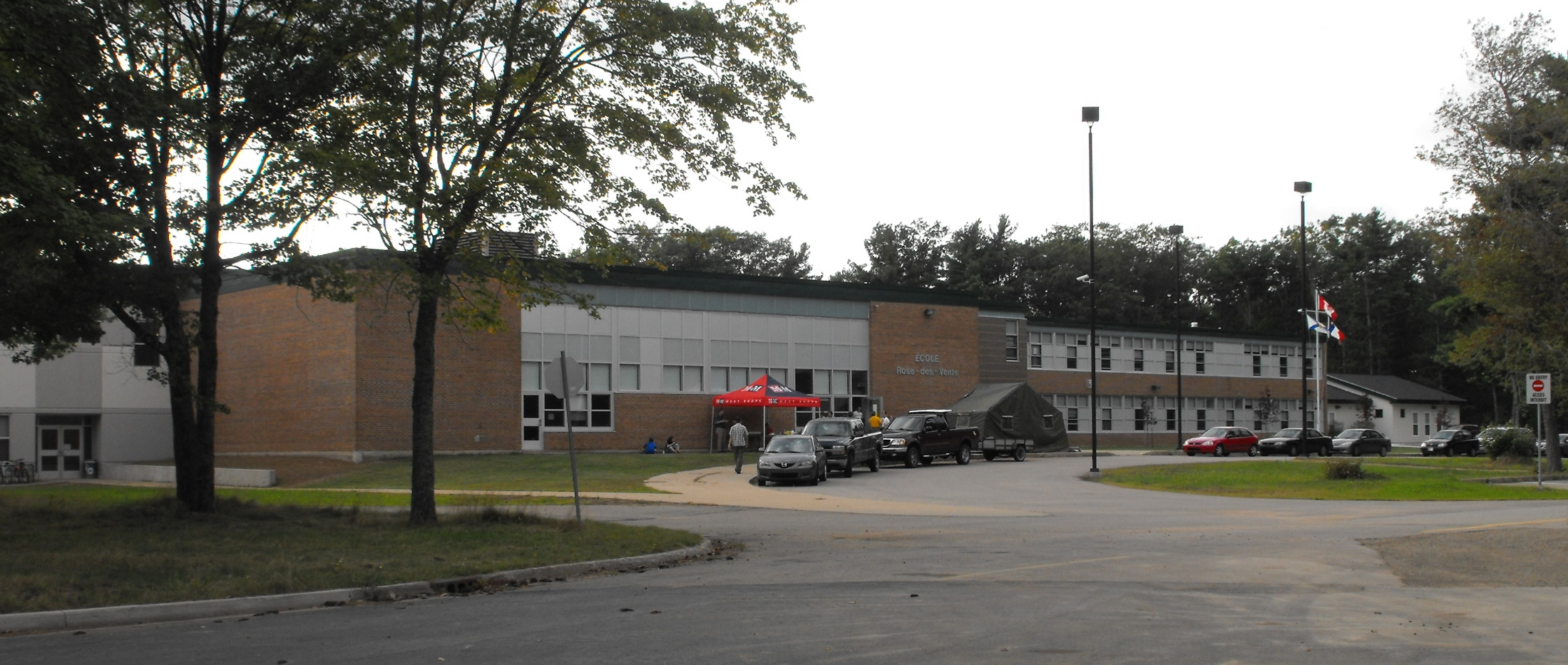

Location
- 6 Bedford Road; Greenwood, Nova Scotia, Nova Scotia, B0P 1N0; Canada

Information
- School board: Conseil scolaire acadien provincial (CSAP)
- School number: 0057
- Principal: Judy Streatch
- Grades: Pre-K-12
- Enrollment: 198 (2016)
- Language: French
- Website: erdv.ednet.ns.ca

École Rose-des-Vents is a Francophone school located in Greenwood, Nova Scotia operated by the Conseil scolaire acadien provincial (CSAP).

== Origins of the building ==
École Rose-des-Vents was originally built as an elementary school for children of Canadian Forces Base 14 Wing Greenwood personnel and was named Russell C. Gordon Elementary School. It was designed by the Toronto firm of Craig and Madill and was completed in 1962. Completed two years after Dwight Ross Elementary School (DRES), both schools were situated in the CFB Greenwood PMQ neighbourhood Clements Park. Both schools, along with A.V.M. Morfee Elementary, which opened in 1949, and École francophone, which opened in 1976, exclusively served children of military personnel until 1988. The schools welcomed children from Kindergarten to Grade 9. Civilian children attended Kingston & District Elementary School and Greenwood District School (now the Greenwood Civic Centre). All children from Grade 10 to Grade 12 attended West Kings District High School.

== Origins of French-language Education in Greenwood ==
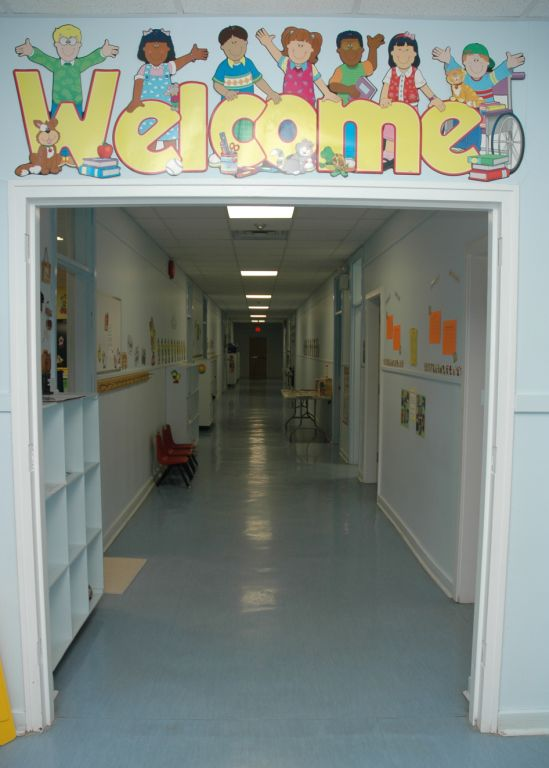
Inside AVM Morfee Annex building, now a daycare for the GMFRC, formally École Francophone

In 1971, the Canadian Forces held a survey asking military personnel the language in which they would prefer their children to be instructed, in reaction to the country's new federal policies on official bilingualism. The survey showed that 35 dependents in CFB Greenwood were eligible for French-language education and had parents that were interested in this instruction.

In September 1976, École francophone opened in CFB Greenwood, welcoming 21 students of francophone military families from Kindergarten to Grade 4. Annik Hjelkrum is the first principal of this new school. This homogeneous French-language facility was originally located in two combined PMQ apartments in Clements Park that were refurbished into classrooms. In 1978, École francophone moved to a new building neighbouring A.V.M. Morfee Elementary School, now called the Morfee Annex Building. In the 1980s, École francophone would offer classes up to Grade 8 and welcome between 60 and 90 students.

== Amalgamation ==
In 1988, all Canadian Forces Bases schools closed, including A.V.M. Morfee Elementary School and École Francophone. Students from those schools were transferred to R.C. Gordon Elementary School and to Dwight Ross Elementary School, with both these buildings and its new students being transferred to the Kings County School Board (now the Annapolis Valley Regional School Board or AVRSB). The Kings County School Board decided to continue administering École Francophone within R.C. Gordon (Kindergarten - Grade 6) and DRES (Grade 7 - Grade 9), where both English- and French-language instruction would continue. It was at this point where non-military francophone families were allowed to enroll their children in French. André Tessier became the principal of the new École Francophone and R.C. Gordon School.

Following pressure from the francophone community to reunite their children from École francophone under one roof, francophone Grade 7 to Grade 9 students from DRES transferred to the R.C. Gordon building in 1992. In this same year, youth from Greenwood participated in the Jeux régionaux de la Nouvelle-Écosse (Jeux de l'Acadie) for the first time.

In 1994, Constance Mary-Ann Zohar-Hiscock became principal of École francophone and R.C. Gordon School. The following year, André Tessier resumed being principal of both schools.

== A new school board ==
In 1996, the Conseil scolaire acadien provincial was created and took responsibility of francophone students at R.C. Gordon. From then on, the building would be shared by both the CSAP, which renamed its French stream from École francophone to École R.C. Gordon, and the newly formed AVRSB, which named its English stream R.C. Gordon School. The CSAP also designated five teachers who would become employees of the new francophone school board. Constance Mary-Ann Zohar-Hiscock was once again principal of both streams. With the end of Kings County School Board, it was at this point where francophone families from Annapolis County, and consequently from all of the Annapolis Valley, were allowed to enroll their children in French, at École R.C. Gordon.

In 1997, Louis Cormier become the principal of École R.C. Gordon, while the building's English stream hired their own principal. In 1998, École R.C. Gordon saw its first high school graduates, with three students completing Grade 12. The school has been offering Grade 12 ever since. Also that year, the Nova Scotia Department of Education announced funding for a new science laboratory. In 1999, the French stream comprised more students than the English stream for the first time (204 v. 193). For many years, francophone parents had been mobilizing to make the R.C. Gordon building a homogeneous francophone school, especially since the building was overcrowded and many students had to be taught in detached trailers.

== Beginning of École Rose-des-Vents ==
Following the Supreme Court of Nova Scotia ruling in favor of francophone parents in Doucet-Boudreau v. Nova Scotia (which then reached in Supreme Court of Canada in 2002–03, where the parents won again), all anglophone students from R.C. Gordon School were to be transferred to DRES and Kingston & District Elementary School by September 2000 in order to make École R.C. Gordon a homogeneous francophone school. As in other communities such as Clare, Argyle, Isle Madame and Chéticamp, the CSAP took ownership of the building. In 2001, the students and staff voted to change the school's name to École Rose-des-Vents, a French-language name reflecting the diversity of its families, mostly military, who originate from all corners of the world.

== Later history ==
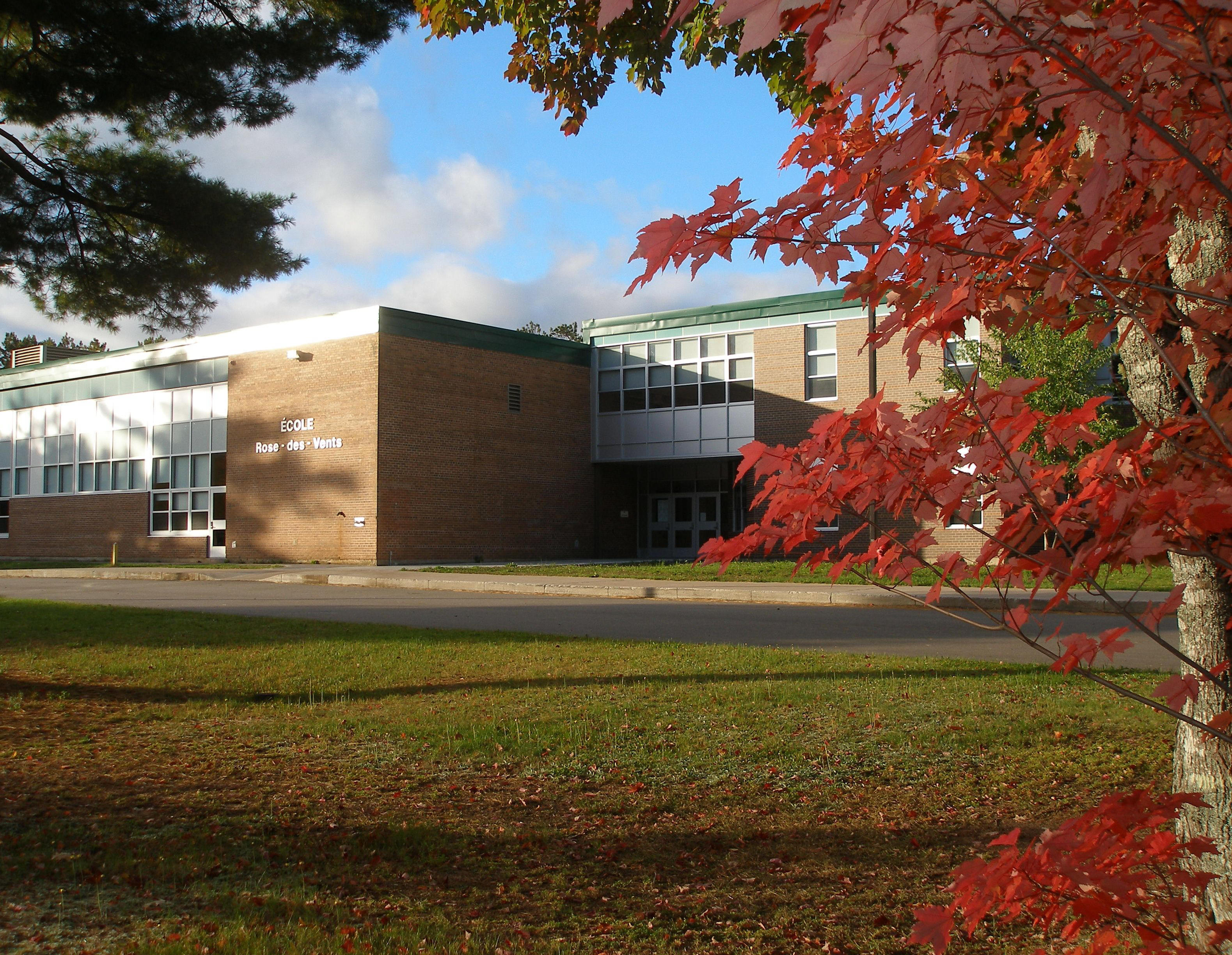
École Rose-des-Vents from the front

Between 2003 and 2007 there was a series of upgrades and additions to school including a new gymnasium, an information technology lab, a new library and additional offices. Simultaneously, the surrounding PMQ neighbourhood Clements Park was declared a surplus by CFB Greenwood, emptied and demolished. Gilwell Hall, a community centre situated next to the school, was also demolished. DRES and the renovated École Rose-des-Vents remain.

Marie-Josée Villeneuve become the school's principal in 2006. That same year, École Rose-des-Vents was selected the CSAP's pilot program, Grandir en français, which saw the inclusion of a Pre-Kindergarten class in the school. The program became permanent a year later. Also in 2006, the Association francophone de la Vallée, a community association representing the Valley's francophones since 1996 and a member of the Fédération acadienne de la Nouvelle-Écosse, built an adjoining French-language community centre, the Centre Point de mire. In 2008, the Annapolis Valley and the school hosted the Rencontre jeunesse provinciale for the first time.

Louis Cormier become principal of the school again in 2010. In May 2011, the Annapolis Valley, the school and CFB Greenwood hosted for the first time the Jeux régionaux de la Nouvelle-Écosse (Jeux de l'Acadie) of that year. As of 2014, Judy Streatch, former Nova Scotia Minister of Education, is the school's principal.

Today, École Rose-des-Vents houses approximately 200 francophone students from Greenwood, Kingston, and all Annapolis Valley communities.

== Notable alumni ==
Thibault Jacquot-Paratte - Author, musician and interdisciplinary artist
