= Pink Shirt Day =

Annual anti-bullying event

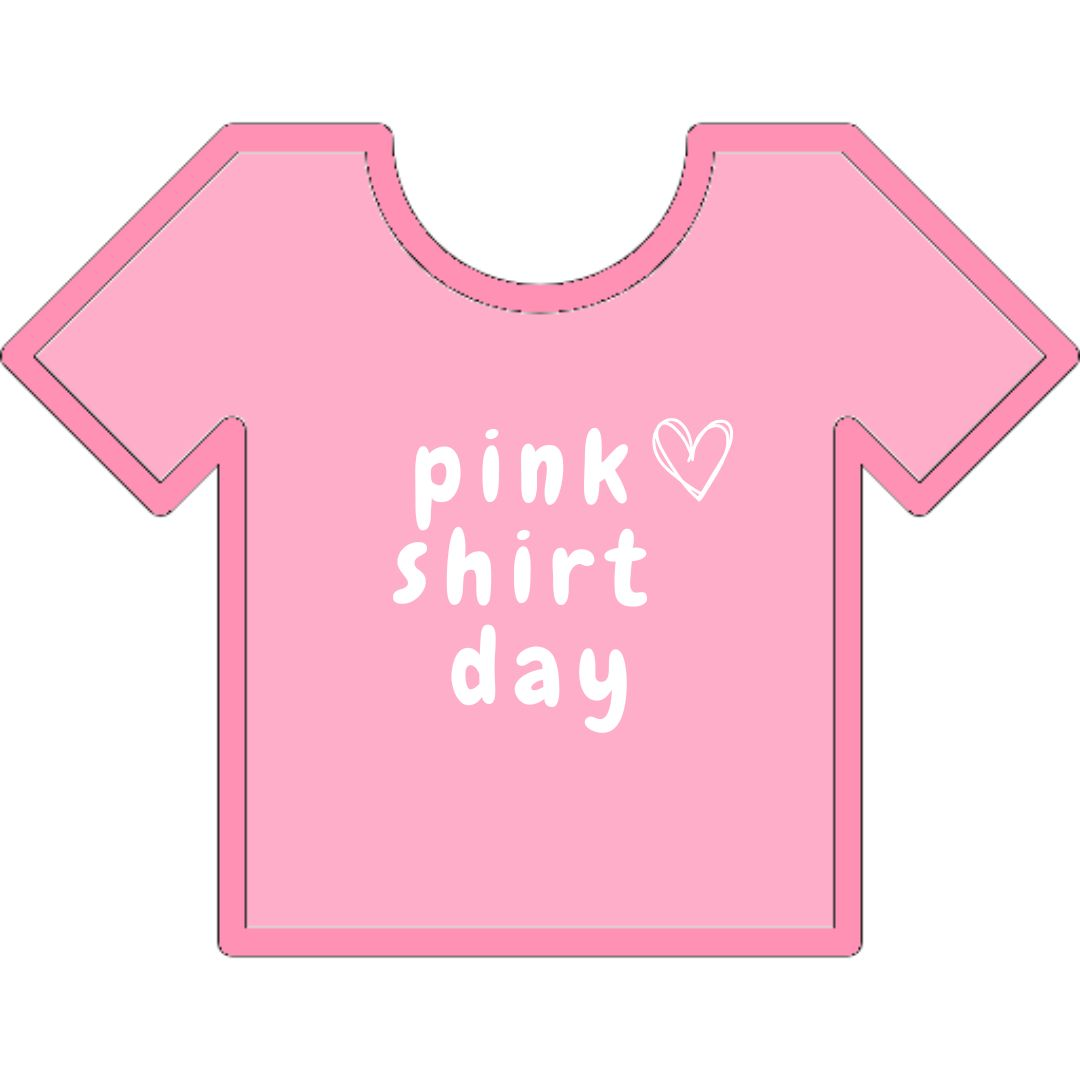
- Observed by: Canada, New Zealand
- Date: Last Wednesday of February (Canada); Third Friday of May (New Zealand)
- Frequency: Annual
- First time: September 13, 2007; 19 years ago
- Started by: David Shepherd and Travis Price

Pink Shirt Day is an annual event against bullying held in Canada and New Zealand. Participants wear pink shirts and attend or host informative events to raise awareness about bullying, particularly in schools. Pink Shirt Day was started in 2007 in Canada, where it is held on the last Wednesday of February each year. It was adopted in New Zealand in 2009 and is observed annually on the third Friday of May.

== History ==
The original event was organized in 2007 by two grade 12 students named David Shepherd and Travis Price of Berwick, Nova Scotia, who bought and distributed 50 pink shirts after a ninth-grade student Chuck McNeill was bullied for wearing a pink polo shirt during the first day of school at Central Kings Rural High School in Cambridge, Nova Scotia. That year, former Nova Scotia Premier Rodney MacDonald proclaimed the second Thursday of September (aligning with the start of each school year) as "Stand Up Against Bullying Day" in recognition of these events.

In 2008, then-Premier of British Columbia, Gordon Campbell proclaimed February 27 to be the provincial Anti-Bullying Day. In 2009, the Boys & Girls Clubs of Canada worked on pink t-shirts that say "Bullying Stops Here." and "Pink Shirt Day" for Anti-Bullying Day.

In May 2009, New Zealand celebrated its first Pink Shirt Day.

In 2012, the United Nations declared May 4 as U.N. Anti-Bullying Day. Similarly, UNESCO declared the first Thursday of November as the International Day against Violence and Bullying at School Including Cyberbullying.

== Purpose ==
Anti-Bullying Day was instituted to prevent further bullying. The United States Department of Justice showed that one out of four kids will be bullied during their adolescence.

This remains an important issue, as studies in Canada show that a large proportion of youth experience bullying, particularly sexually and gender diverse groups, and that bullying is associated with increased stress and negative physical and mental health outcomes.

== Activities ==
Anti-Bullying Day activities can take place at schools, workplaces, or any peer group location. They may include "abolishing bullying" rallies, information and networking booths to help the community in understanding the evils of bullying, and publicizing anti-discrimination organizations. Examples include Blue Shirt World Day of Bullying Prevention, National Bullying awareness month, and Pink Shirt Day. Other features include handouts, resources, and information promoting the message of the "National Day of Action Against Bullying and Violence". Examples of other activities include races, conferences, video-creating competitions such as the "ScreenIt!" and the "Back me up" competitions, and community events, all used to spread awareness of bullying and violence, The initiative seeks to support the work of students, educators, community and business in their efforts to stop bullying, discrimination, homophobia and transphobia.

== See also ==
- Anti-bullying legislation
- Anti-bullying week
- Cyberbullying
- International Day of Pink
- International Stand Up to Bullying Day
- Orange Shirt Day
