= Annapolis Royal Regional Academy =

Coordinates: 44°44′27″N 65°30′27″W

Annapolis Royal Regional Academy was a junior high school located in Annapolis Royal, Nova Scotia. Its range was from grades 6–8; fewer than 200 students were attending Annapolis Royal Regional Academy in its final half-year, September 2014 - January 2015. In February 2015, all students moved to the nearby Annapolis West Education Centre. The school building is currently under the town of Annapolis Royal's control; the town is looking to "repurpose" the facility as condominiums.

== School teams ==
The after school sports team was the ARRA Royals. The mascot was a lion with a red crown, hence the name "Royal".
