= Rankin School of the Narrows =

Coordinates: 45.94706°N 60.81770°W

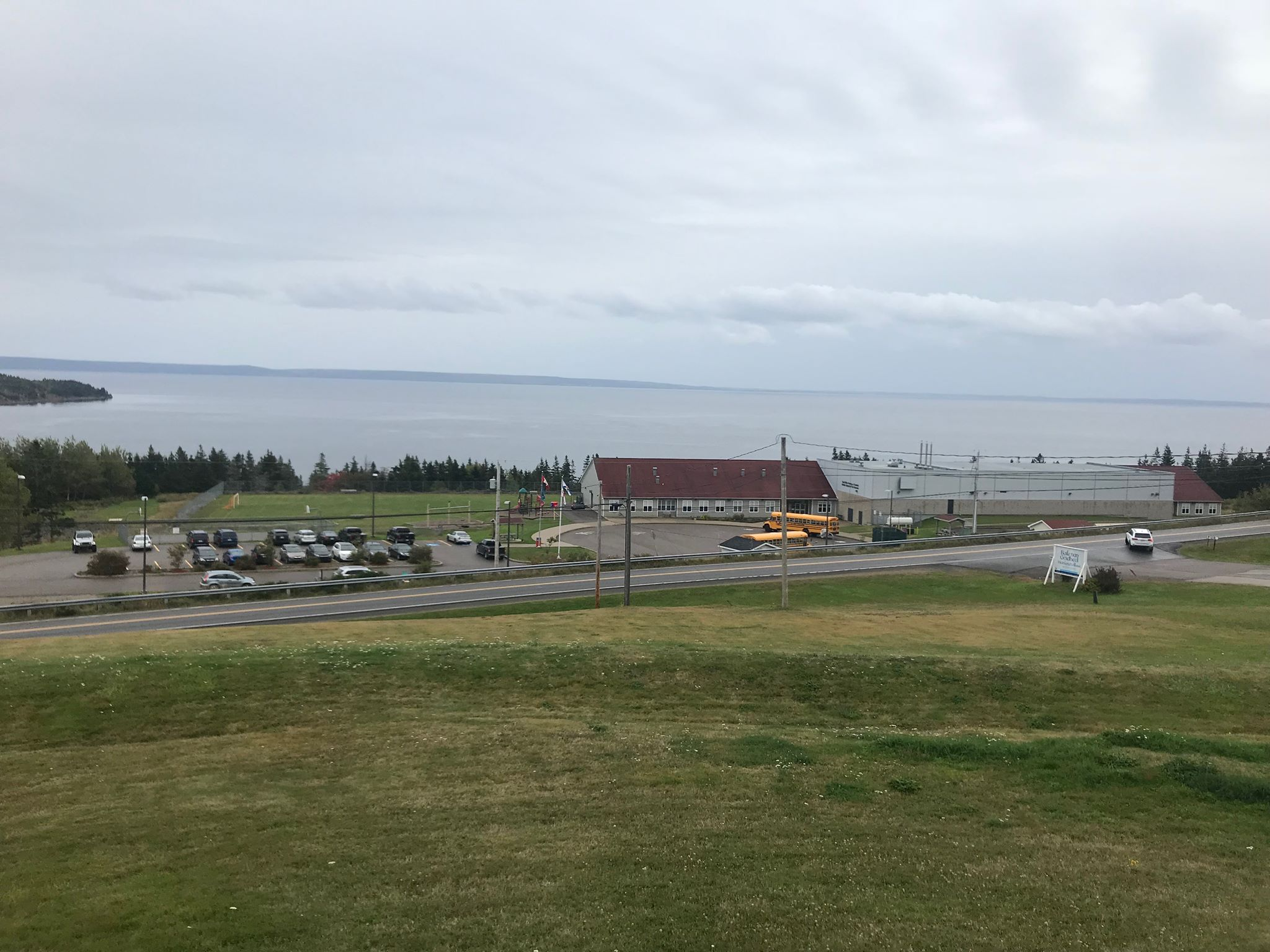
- Rankin School of the Narrows, October 2018

Location
- 4144 Highway 223; Iona, Nova Scotia; Canada

Information
- Type: Primary-12
- Principal: Angie Harvey
- Grades: Primary-12

Iona in Nova Scotia

Rankin School of the Narrows (Sgoil Mhic Fhraing a Chaolais in Gaelic) is a Primary through Grade 12 school located in Iona, Nova Scotia, Canada, on Cape Breton Island in Victoria County. It is governed by the Cape Breton – Victoria Regional School Board.

The 2008-09 enrollment of the school was 128 students, with 54 at the elementary level, 42 at the junior level and 32 at the senior high level.

== History ==
The school was approved for construction in 2003 and opened in 2007. Built for $8 million, it is reported to be the first LEED compliant school in Nova Scotia. It replaced Rankin Memorial School, which opened in 1958, and which was named after Father D.J.Rankin, a longtime parish priest in Iona who had been dedicated to local education.

The "Narrows" in the school's name comes from the nearby "Grand Narrows" of Bras d'Or Lake, formally known as the Barra Strait.
