= Canadian Centre for Gender and Sexual Diversity =

Canadian charitable organization

- Formation: 2005 as Jer's Vision
- Legal status: No Longer in Operation (2024)
- Purpose: Anti-Bullying, Gay rights in Canada
- Headquarters: Ottawa, Ontario
- Location: Canada

The Canadian Centre for Gender and Sexual Diversity (CCGSD) was a Canadian charitable organization that operated from 2005 to 2024. CCGSD worked towards stopping bullying, discrimination, and homophobia in schools and communities in Canada. CCGSD closed their operations in October 2024.

== History ==
The CCGSD, originally known as Jer's Vision, was founded by a six-member board in 2005. Originally starting with a scholarship program, the organization grew to include a range of programs to address challenges related to bullying, homophobia, and transphobia in schools.

The organization rebranded in March 2015 as the Canadian Centre for Gender and Sexual Diversity (CCGSD).

In October 2024, CCGSD announced they had closed operations due to bankruptcy.

== CCGSD's Work ==
The Canadian Centre for Gender and Sexual Diversity worked with schools to develop programs that engage students, staff, and the wider community to understand bullying, discrimination, homophobia and transphobia. This included presentations, workshops, conferences, training, professional development, and other efforts to support youth initiatives and clubs.

In 2007, youth from Jer's Vision were inspired by David Shepherd and Travis Price to start the International Day of Pink. The initiative supports youth actions to stop bullying in schools and communities. In 2012, over 8 million people participated in the International Day of Pink.

=== The Gay Sweater ===
On March 24, 2015, the CCGSD launched The Gay Sweater website. The campaign, aimed at reclaiming the phrase "that's so gay" by creating an actual gay object - namely a sweater knit from yarn made from 100% human hair donated by the LGBT community - was timed to coincide with Toronto Fashion Week. The Gay Sweater received widespread coverage and the YouTube video had 45,000 views in the first 48 hours.

== See also ==
- LGBT rights in Canada
- List of LGBT rights organisations
- International Day of Pink
