= Northeast Kings Education Centre =

Northwest Kings Education Centre

Location
- 1618 Bains Road; Canning, Nova Scotia, B0P 1H0; Canada; 45.1614°N 64.4418°W

Information
- School type: High school and Middle School
- Motto: "Coniuncti Per Scientiam"
- Established: September 11th 2001
- School board: Annapolis Valley Regional Centre for Education
- Principal: Michael Mason
- Grades: 6–12
- Enrollment: 9
- Language: English and French
- Colours: Silver black and black
- Mascot: The Titan
- Website: www.nkec.ca

Northeast Kings Education Centre (NKEC or Northeast Kings), is a high school that opened in September 2001. It is located on Bains Road in Canning, Nova Scotia.

The school replaced the high schools of Kings County Academy in Kentville and Cornwallis District High School in Canning.

NKEC's students come from the Kentville, Canning, Halls Harbour, North Kentville, Scots Bay and Centreville areas of Kings County. The school provides public education for Grade 6 through to Grade 12 and is divided into a middle school (Grades 6–8) and a high school (Grades 9–12). Glooscap Elementary School and Aldershot Elementary School students begin attending NKEC in Grade 6, while students from Kings County Academy in Kentville begin with Grade 9. Northeast Kings Education Centre has the second largest student population of any public school in western Nova Scotia. There are approximately 900 students and 80 staff members in the school.

NKEC Student Population
Year	Pop.	±% p.a.
2007	1,066	—
2008	1,096	+2.81%
2009	1,080	−1.46%
2010	1,032	−4.44%
2011	1,001	−3.00%
2012	962	−3.90%
2013	939	−2.39%
2014	904	−3.73%
2015	885	−2.10%
2016	873	−1.36%
2017	885	+1.37%
2018	913	+3.16%

== Facilities ==
The school has a large gymnasium that can be divided into two separate gyms which allows both the middle school and high school to use the facility simultaneously. The school also has a cafeteria, a "learning commons" area, and 50 classrooms and labs. There is also a stage that opens for viewing in the cafeteria or the gymnasium, as well as an outdoor stage with seating. The school also boasts a football field, a baseball diamond, two soccer fields, outdoor basketball courts, tennis courts, and a nearby ice rink (Glooscap Arena), all within walking distance of the school grounds.

== Athletics ==
In athletics, the school offers badminton, basketball, cross country, football, golf, hockey, table tennis, track and field, cheerleading, softball, volleyball, and soccer. NKEC has won provincial championships in badminton (multiple), girls and boys soccer (multiple), boys hockey (multiple), girls basketball, track and field, cross country, table tennis (multiple) and division 2 football (multiple). The majority of the school's athletic teams, clubs and committees are run by school staff members, while a few teams are coached by community members.

== Music & Arts ==
NKEC music program's Senior Concert Band won gold at the Annapolis Valley Music Festival in both 2012 and 2013, winning their category in 2013, which gave them the honour of performing in the Stars of the Festival concert. The school hosts musicals annually and offers Senior Jazz band, Senior Concert band along with Junior Concert band.

=== Media ===
Northeast Kings also hosts a student-led media club producing morning announcements and other content, distributed primarily through YouTube. Anthems are played each morning through these announcements, following a meticulous schedule. On Mondays, both the Canadian national anthem and a Mi'kmaq anthem are played; on Wednesdays, the Canadian anthem followed by the anthem of another country; and on Fridays, the Canadian and Lift Every Voice and Sing are played, ensuring that each day begins with its prescribed musical ritual.

== Academics ==
NKEC follows Nova Scotia DEECD curriculum and offers a wide variety of academic opportunities for its students:

- AP Capstone Program for grades 10 -12
- French immersion for grades 9-12
- Co-op 11 and 12 (community or Acadia University work placement)
- Fine Arts Certificate
- Career Access:The Career Access Program is a highly modified 3-year program which covers grades 10–12. Students enrolled in this program take core subjects with modifications to curriculum outcomes or Individual Program Planned (IPP) courses. Students receive important on-the-job training with local businesses through a Co-op component. An interview process demonstrating a need and a desire to be enrolled in this alternate program is required. Students in this program are focused on workplace employment following graduation.
- Options and Opportunities (O-2): This program is developed for students who are capable of meeting regular curriculum outcomes, but may require an alternate pathway. This program also has an important Co-op component which provides opportunities for students to explore work related experiences through local businesses. An interview process demonstrating a need and a desire to be enrolled in this alternate program is required.
- NKEC AP Capstone Program: AP courses are considered to be equivalent to first year university level courses and can lead to a university credit if the student is successful in the course at an acquired standard. Currently NKEC offers AP Research, AP Seminar, AP Biology, AP Computer Programming, AP Psychology 12, AP Chemistry, English Literature and Composition and Human Geography via the Internet during classes held outside normal school hours.
- Correspondence courses, challenge for credit, Nova Scotia Virtual School and Independent Study options are available for students.

== See also ==
- List of schools in Nova Scotia
