= Avon View High School =

Coordinates: 44.979773°N 64.118046°W

Avon View High School (AVHS)

Location
- 225 Payzant Drive; Windsor, Nova Scotia; Canada

Information
- Type: High School
- Motto: Home of the Yeti!
- Established: 2003
- Category: School
- Principal: Paul Hanson
- Grades: 9-12
- Enrollment: Approximately 900
- Colors: Navy and White
- Mascot: Yeti
- Nickname: AV
- Rival: Kings Edgehill
- Website: Avon View High School

Avon View High School (AVHS) is a secondary school located in Garlands Crossing, Hants County, Nova Scotia, Canada. It serves students from grades 9 to 12. The school provides education services for approximately 900 students in the Windsor, Nova Scotia area. The school currently employs 70-80 teachers, administration and janitorial staff, and is operated as one of the 40 schools in the Annapolis Valley Regional School Board.

== Student Council ==
Avon View has a student council which is responsible for aiding the administration in the regulation of extra curricular activities at the school. The council has different responsibilities for members depending on their group within the council. Co-Primes, who are responsible for heading the group, Finance, which is responsible for maintaining the budget, Athletics, which is responsible for organizing extra curricular sports activities, Communications, which is responsible for advertising the actions of the group, Special Events, who are responsible for organizing activities within the school, such as Avon View's monthly dances and the grade 9 reps who manage the grade 9 student body. The student council is by elections by the students of Avon View.

== See also ==
- List of schools in Nova Scotia
