= Greenwood, Nova Scotia =

Greenwood
- Village
- Coat of arms
- Nickname: The Valley's Hidden Jewel - G-wood - GWD
- Location of Greenwood, Nova Scotia
- Coordinates: 44°58′08″N 64°56′19″W
- Country: Canada
- Province: Nova Scotia
- County: Kings County
- Founded: 1770
- Incorporated Village: 1961
- Electoral Districts Federal: Acadie—Annapolis
- Provincial: Kings West

Government
  - Type: Village Commission
  - Greenwood Village Commission: Chair
- Elevation: 28 m (92 ft)

Population (2011)
  - Total: 5,369
- Time zone: UTC-4 (AST)
  - Summer (DST): UTC-3 (ADT)
- Canadian postal code: B0P 0A0 & B0P 1N0
- Area code: 902
- Telephone Exchange: 242, 760, 765, 804, 996
- NTS Map: 21A15 Gaspereau Lake
- GNBC Code: CAORH
- Website: greenwood novascotia.com

Greenwood is a village located in the western part of Kings County in Nova Scotia's Annapolis Valley.

== History ==
Greenwood was a small hamlet south of the Dominion Atlantic Railway's Kingston Station. In 1942, the Royal Air Force established RAF Station Greenwood and built an aerodrome on nearby farmland to provide a facility for training aircrew under the British Commonwealth Air Training Plan. The Royal Canadian Air Force took over the facility in 1944, renaming it RCAF Station Greenwood, a name it maintained until the 1 February 1968 unification of the Canadian Forces which saw the airfield and associated facilities renamed CFB Greenwood. In July 1997 the air base became one of eleven operational wings in Canada, and was designated as 14 Wing Greenwood.

During the 1970s–2000s, the village of Greenwood expanded in population as numerous other air force bases in eastern Canada closed and their aircraft and personnel consolidated at CFB Greenwood. Much of the housing in the heart of Greenwood is for the military families stationed at the base, and are referred to as PMQs. Most of the non-military housing for the village is located on the outskirts.

== Schools ==
- Dwight Ross School
- École Rose-des-Vents

== Government ==
Federal - Greenwood falls under the West Nova federal electoral district in Nova Scotia. Chris d'Entremont was elected as an MP to represent this riding in the 2019 Canadian federal election. He is a member of the Conservative Party.

Provincial - Greenwood, Berwick, and Kingston fall under the Kings West provincial electoral district. Leo A. Glavine represents Kings West in the Nova Scotia House of Assembly and has held the position since 2003. He is a member of the Liberal Party.

Municipal - Greenwood is a community within the Municipality of the County of Kings. In the October 2020 civic election Peter Muttart was re-elected as mayor and June Granger, Lexie Misner, Dick Killam, Martha Armstrong, Tim Harding, Joel Hirtle, Emily Lutz, Jim Winsor and Peter Allen were elected to the municipal council. Councillor Martha Armstrong represents District 4 which encompasses the village of Kingston, parts of the village of Greenwood and the community of Auburn. Councillor Tim Harding represents District 5, which encompasses South Greenwood and Canadian Forces Base 14 Wing Greenwood and several other communities.

== Climate ==
Greenwood experiences a humid continental climate (Dfb).

The highest temperature ever recorded in Greenwood was 37.2 °C (99 °F) on 12 August 1944. The coldest temperature ever recorded was −35.5 °C (−31.9 °F) on 7 February 1993.

Climate data for Greenwood Airport, 1991–2020 normals, extremes 1942–present
Month	Jan	Feb	Mar	Apr	May	Jun	Jul	Aug	Sep	Oct	Nov	Dec	Year
Record high °C (°F)	19.0 (66.2)	20.0 (68.0)	25.8 (78.4)	30.3 (86.5)	33.8 (92.8)	35.0 (95.0)	35.6 (96.1)	37.2 (99.0)	34.1 (93.4)	30.1 (86.2)	25.0 (77.0)	19.5 (67.1)	37.2 (99.0)
Mean daily maximum °C (°F)	−0.2 (31.6)	0.4 (32.7)	4.3 (39.7)	10.6 (51.1)	17.5 (63.5)	22.5 (72.5)	26.2 (79.2)	25.7 (78.3)	21.3 (70.3)	14.6 (58.3)	8.7 (47.7)	3.1 (37.6)	12.9 (55.2)
Daily mean °C (°F)	−5.0 (23.0)	−4.6 (23.7)	−0.6 (30.9)	5.3 (41.5)	11.3 (52.3)	16.4 (61.5)	20.1 (68.2)	19.4 (66.9)	15.1 (59.2)	9.2 (48.6)	4.2 (39.6)	−1.2 (29.8)	7.5 (45.5)
Mean daily minimum °C (°F)	−9.8 (14.4)	−9.6 (14.7)	−5.5 (22.1)	0.0 (32.0)	5.2 (41.4)	10.1 (50.2)	14.0 (57.2)	13.1 (55.6)	8.9 (48.0)	3.7 (38.7)	−0.3 (31.5)	−5.5 (22.1)	2.0 (35.6)
Record low °C (°F)	−28.9 (−20.0)	−35.5 (−31.9)	−27.2 (−17.0)	−14.4 (6.1)	−7.2 (19.0)	−1.7 (28.9)	2.8 (37.0)	0.2 (32.4)	−4.4 (24.1)	−8.9 (16.0)	−16.2 (2.8)	−26.1 (−15.0)	−35.5 (−31.9)
Average precipitation mm (inches)	103.6 (4.08)	87.3 (3.44)	89.8 (3.54)	83.4 (3.28)	78.1 (3.07)	82.2 (3.24)	75.4 (2.97)	79.7 (3.14)	105.7 (4.16)	106.7 (4.20)	120.1 (4.73)	124.9 (4.92)	1,137 (44.76)
Average rainfall mm (inches)	46.4 (1.83)	43.7 (1.72)	51.5 (2.03)	69.4 (2.73)	77.2 (3.04)	82.2 (3.24)	75.4 (2.97)	79.7 (3.14)	105.7 (4.16)	106.5 (4.19)	105.3 (4.15)	79.6 (3.13)	922.8 (36.33)
Average snowfall cm (inches)	78.2 (30.8)	60.1 (23.7)	45.1 (17.8)	13.3 (5.2)	1.0 (0.4)	0.0 (0.0)	0.0 (0.0)	0.0 (0.0)	0.0 (0.0)	0.2 (0.1)	14.7 (5.8)	55.6 (21.9)	268.1 (105.6)
Average precipitation days (≥ 0.2 mm)	19.8	15.9	15.4	14.6	14.0	13.1	10.9	10.0	11.2	13.9	15.3	18.9	172.9
Average rainy days (≥ 0.2 mm)	7.4	6.2	8.7	12.4	13.9	13.1	10.9	10.0	11.2	13.8	13.6	11.4	132.5
Average snowy days (≥ 0.2 cm)	16.3	13.2	10.4	4.3	0.3	0.0	0.0	0.0	0.0	0.1	3.4	11.8	59.9
Average relative humidity (%) (at 15:00 LST)	77.0	72.5	65.0	56.6	55.8	56.4	56.9	56.1	59.8	62.2	70.2	76.5	63.8
Source: Environment Canada
