= Anti-Bullying Week =

Annual observance in the UK

Anti-Bullying Week is an annual UK event held in the third week in November which aims to raise awareness of bullying of children and young people, in schools and elsewhere, and to highlight ways of preventing and responding to it. Anti-Bullying Week is organised by the Anti-Bullying Alliance (ABA) in England, which is made up of about 140 member organizations. In Northern Ireland the event is coordinated by the Northern Ireland Anti-Bullying Forum (NIABF), made up of 25 member organisations from the voluntary and statutory sectors.

== England events ==
Anti-Bullying Weeks in England have been:

1. 2004 – First Anti-Bullying Week – 22 to 26 November 2004 (included launch of the 'stand up for us' guidance for primary schools and secondary schools).
2. 2005 – Second Anti-Bullying Week – 21 to 25 November 2005 (launched at Westminster Central Hall, London). The event was co-hosted by the Anti-Bullying Alliance (ABA), Childline, and the Diana Memorial Award.
3. 2006 – Third Anti-Bullying Week – 20–24 November 2006. The theme was the Bystander ('See it, Stop it, Get help').
4. 2007 – Fourth Anti-Bullying Week – 19–23 November 2007. The theme was Bullying in the Community ('Safer Together, Safer Wherever').
5. 2008 – Fifth Anti-Bullying Week – 7–14 September 2008. The theme was Difference and Diversity ('Being Different, Belonging Together').
6. 2009 – Anti-Bullying Week 2009 (16-20 November) focused on cyberbullying, with the slogan 'Stay Safe in Cyberspace'.
7. 2010 – The theme for the seventh year (22-26 November 2010) was 'Taking Action Together'.
8. 2011 – The eighth annual event took place between Monday 14 November and 18 November 2011, and the theme was 'Stop and think – words can hurt'.
9. 2012 – The ninth annual event took place on 19–23 November 2012
10. 2013 – The tenth annual event took place on 18–22 November 2013, with the theme 'The future's ours: safe, fun and connected'.
11. 2014 – The eleventh annual event took place 17–21 November 2014, with the theme 'Let's stop bullying for all'.
12. 2015 – held on 16–20 November, with the theme 'Make a Noise about Bullying'
13. 2016 – held on 14–18 November and had the theme 'Power for Good'
14. 2017 – held on 13–17 November and had the theme 'All Different, All Equal' and the first Odd Socks Day was held during the first day of Anti-Bullying Week to celebrate what makes us all unique
15. 2018 – held on 12–16 November with the theme 'Choose Respect'
16. 2019 – held on 11–15 November with the theme 'change starts with us'
17. 2020 – held on 16–20 November with the theme 'United Against Bullying'
18. 2021 - held on 15 to 19 November with the theme 'One Kind Word'

== Northern Ireland events ==
In Northern Ireland the annual campaign is run during the same week, but under a different theme. Anti-Bullying Week campaigns in Northern Ireland are:

1. ABW05 – 21–25 November 2005 – Launch of NIABF
2. ABW06 – 20–24 November 2006 – 'Don't Just Stand There' – the role of the bystander
3. ABW07 – 19–23 November 2007 – Dual theme – 'Bullying due to race, faith and culture' & 'Cyber Bullying'
4. ABW08 – 17–21 November 2008 – 'Tackling the fear of being bullied in a new school'
5. ABW09 – 16–20 November 2009 – 'Bullying on the way to and from school'
6. ABW10 – 15–19 November 2010 – 'Where the bullying is...and how we can stop it' – bullying hotspots in school
7. ABW11 – 14–18 November 2011 – 'End Cyber Bullying'
8. ABW12 – 19–23 November 2012 – 'Everybody is Somebody' – bullying motivated by difference and prejudice
9. ABW13 – 18–22 November 2013 – 'I See, I Hear, I Feel' – including name-calling, spreading rumours, 'dirty looks' and cyber bullying
10. ABW14 – 17–21 November 2014 – 'Together We Will Make a Difference – END BULLYING NOW!' – individual and collective roles in tackling bullying
11. ABW15 – 16–20 November 2015 – 'What Bullying Means to Me' – definition and understanding of bullying behaviour

== See also ==
- Anti-Bullying Day
- International STAND UP to Bullying Day
