= Bridgetown Regional High School =

Coordinates: 44.84029°N 65.27577°W

Bridgetown Regional Community School

Location
- 456 Granville Street; Bridgetown, Nova Scotia; Canada

Information
- Type: School
- Motto: Palma Non Sine Pulvere (Latin) "No Victory Without Struggle"
- Established: 1951
- Grades: 6-12
- Enrollment: 350-400
- Colors: Blue and white
- Mascot: Trojan
- Website: Bridgetown Regional Community School

Bridgetown Regional High School (BRHS) was a Canadian secondary school located in Bridgetown, Nova Scotia. The building was designed by Douglas A. Webber and built in 1956. It served students from grades 6 to 12. In June 2017, the school closed, students from Bridgetown Regional High School and Bridgetown Regional Elementary School were moved into a new grade primary to 12 school, Bridgetown Regional Community School.

Bridgetown Regional Elementary and Lawrencetown Consolidated School fed into the secondary school at grade 6.

== See also ==
- List of schools in Nova Scotia
