= École Rockingham School =

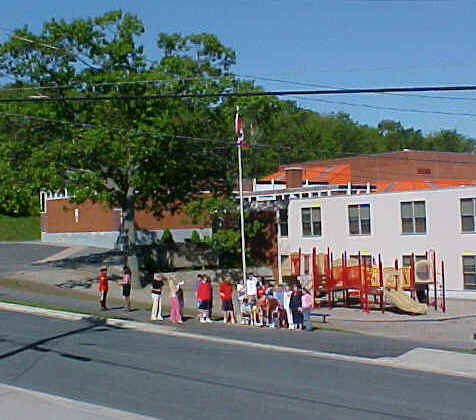

Location
- 31 Tremont Drive; Halifax, Nova Scotia, B3M 1X8; Canada; 44.67693°N 63.65355°W

Information
- School type: Elementary School
- Founded: 1922
- School board: Halifax Regional School Board
- School number: 263 (HRSB), 603 (NS)
- Principal: Brian Toner
- Grades: Primary through 6
- Enrollment: 500 (September 30, 2018)
- Language: English, French immersion
- Colours: Blue, Orange and Yellow
- Website: www.rockingham.ednet.ns.ca

École Rockingham School is one of the oldest schools in all of Nova Scotia. Built in 1922, the school was made to accommodate all children grades 1 through 8 despite its small size. The then two room school was later rebuilt in 1975 and because of the population growth in Halifax, it is now only a primary school (Primary through the sixth grade). Classes in Rockingham are offered both in English and French.
