= Horton High School (Nova Scotia) =

Public high school in Wolfville Ridge, Nova Scotia, Canada

Coordinates: 45.072075°N 64.405783°W

Location
- 75 Greenwich Road South; Wolfville Ridge, Nova Scotia, B4P 2R2; Canada

Information
- Type: Public
- Established: 1998
- Principal: Mr. Jodye Routledge
- Enrollment: 1014
- Colours: Crimson, Black, and Gold
- Mascot: Griffin
- Website: hortonhighschool.ca

Horton High School is a public high school located in Wolfville Ridge, Nova Scotia, Canada. It succeeded Horton District High School (1959-1998).

As of 2024, the school principal is Jodye Routledge. The athletic teams are the 'Griffins'. In 2015, there were approximately 867 students enrolled in grades 9–12 at the school.

The school is fully networked and offers a less than 1.9:1 student-to-computer ratio. The school was a part of Canada's SchoolNet Network of Innovative Schools program which is no longer active.

== Campus and facilities ==
It has a less than 1.9:1 student-to-computer ratio. The four wings are colour coordinated and each wing houses one subject as follows:

- Yellow Wing/Upper East Wing: science
- Green Wing/Upper West Wing: social studies
- Red Wing/Lower East Wing: mathematics
- Blue Wing/Lower West Wing: language arts

These wings and their subjects were initially set in stone with no variation, however nowadays there is some variation in subjects throughout the wings.

Horton High School is equipped with a gymnasium, fitness studio, daycare, foods lab, textiles lab, various labs for technology courses, six full computer labs, three chemistry labs, performance centre seating approximately 500 people, and a fine arts section which includes a large music room with five practice rooms, a music executive office, a music library/deep storage space, and a large drama room.

== Students ==
=== International Baccalaureate ===
Horton High School has been an International Baccalaureate World School since 2012. Their IB Coordinator is Jason Fuller.

=== Performance ===
Horton High School students compete in numerous academic competitions, such as the math, computer science, and chemistry contests run by the University of Waterloo and the American Mathematics Competitions (AMC). It has been highly ranked in standardized testing.

== Extra-curricular activities ==
=== The arts ===
- Concert band
- Choir/vocal ensemble
- Drama club
- Horton creative productions
- Improv club
- Jazz band
- Student music executive
- In the past, the school's music department performed a musical every second year, but since the 2022-2023 school year the department has performed musicals yearly. Past musical productions include My Fair Lady (1997), The Music Man (1998), Crazy for You (2000), Bye Bye Birdie (2002), Once on This Island (2004), Grease (2008), 42nd Street (2010), The Wiz (2012), Legally Blonde (2014), High School Musical (2023), The Addams Family (2024), Les Misérables (2025), and Into the Woods, (2026). They will be performing Hadestown in 2027.
- In 2023, the school's drama club performed a play called Once Upon A Shakespearean Time, which was an original combination of scenes from three different Shakespeare plays: Romeo and Juliet, Macbeth, and A Midsummer Night's Dream. The drama club has plans to perform A Midsummer Night's Dream in full in 2025.
- Throughout the past few years, the school's music department has gone through many changes and expansions, thanks to the hiring of a new music director, Lyndsey "Mitch" Mitchell. Hired in 2021, Mitchell has essentially revived the music department from its stagnant state and established a student music executive and has started to run musical performances every year.

=== Athletics ===
- Badminton
- Baseball
- Basketball
- Cross country
- Curling
- Football
- Golf
- Hockey
- Rugby
- Soccer
- Softball
- Table tennis
- Track and field
- Volleyball
- Wrestling

==== Volleyball ====
Girl Division 2 won NSSAF provincial championship in 2014-2015

==== Basketball ====
Horton's boys' basketball team was nearly unbeatable for two years. In 2008 the Horton Griffins went 41–0, capturing their 2nd consecutive provincial title. In December 2008, Horton broke the Canadian national record with their 73rd straight win. Horton has appeared in five of the last seven provincial championships. Horton boys and girls basketball won 2015-16 provincial Division 1 championship.

==== Soccer ====
The JV girls soccer team has won five provincial championships in a row from the years 2017-2021.

=== Clubs ===
* Best Friends for Lunch
- Environment club
- Gender and Sexuality Alliance (Pride Club)
- Horton Christian Fellowship
- Horton Headstrong committee
- Horton tech crew
- HYDRA Debate club
- Interact club
- Lego Robotics team
- Prom committee
- Relay for Life
- Social Justice club
- Student council
- Dungeons & Dragons club

== Notable alumni ==
- Drake Batherson, professional ice hockey player
- Peter MacKay, former minister of justice, former minister of national defence, former minister of foreign affairs
- Jacob Shaffelburg, professional soccer player
