= Kings County Academy =

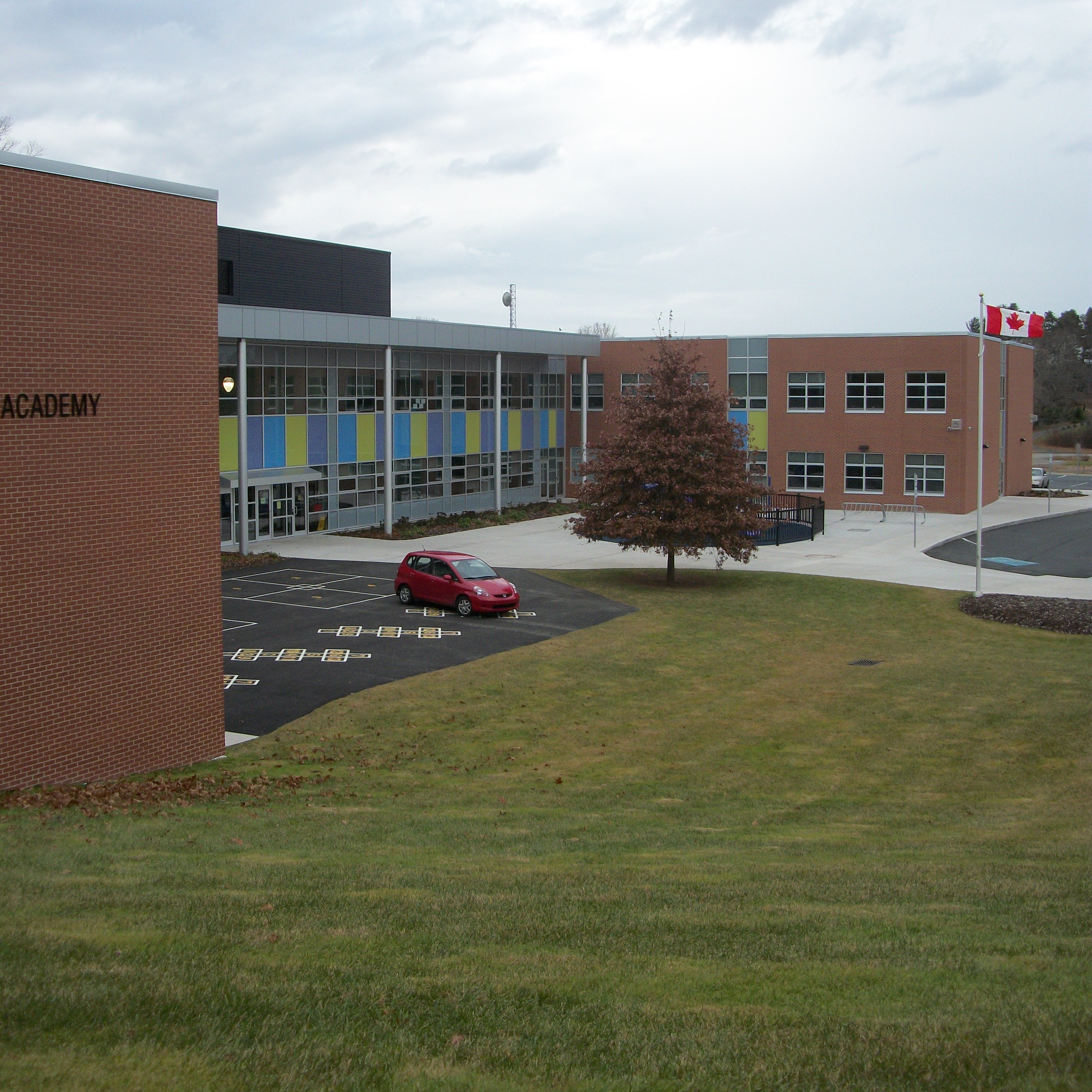

Location
- 35 Gary Pearl Drive; Kentville, Nova Scotia, B4N0H4; Canada
- Coordinates: 45.0757°N 64.5014°W

Information
- Funding type: Public
- Motto: Victoria Per Scientiam
- Founded: 1870
- School board: Annapolis Valley Regional Centre for Education
- Principal: Victoria Laurence
- Vice principal: Kathy Harland
- Vice principal: Lindsay Sheppard
- Grades: Primary to 8
- Language: English, French Immersion
- Colours: Blue and Grey
- Mascot: Kodiak
- Team name: Kodiak's
- Website: www.kca.ednet.ns.ca

Kings County Academy is a Canadian school established in 1870 by the provincial Government of Nova Scotia. It is a public school located on 35 Gary Pearl Drive in Kentville, Nova Scotia.

== History ==
The first building of the academy burnt down in 1893, and was replaced with a newer and larger building. In 1929, a new High School was built and called the "New Academy". In 1933, a fire swept through some of the Old Academy, destroying the Junior High part of the school. A few months later a new building was built, the first Junior High School in Nova Scotia. In 1952 a larger building, including a gymnasium, was built for the Junior High and in 1955 a section was built for the Elementary. Around 1964, a new extension to the High School was built with new labs and adding some more classrooms to the Elementary. In the 1980s the Elementary was torn down and they moved to their present location in the Junior High building and the Junior High moved to the old Elementary building. In 1987 the first cafeteria the school had was built, and a new gym and stage was added. In 2001 the school's last High School class graduated and the school sent their Grade 9,10,11 and 12 students to the newly built Northeast Kings Education Centre in the village of Canning.

The school is a Primary to Grade 8 school and moved to a new location on 35 Gary Pearl Drive in 2011 after a long process of planning and building a modern building. The old building, which was deemed unsafe due to age and other factors, was dismantled over several years, and the lot is now where Ryan's park is being built, which is an assisted living facility for adults with mental and physical disabilities.

== Notable alumni ==
- John Alexander McDonald (politician)
