= West Kings District High School =

Location
- Highway 1, Auburn, Nova Scotia, Canada; Auburn, Nova Scotia; Canada; 45.017988°N 64.876542°W

Information
- Type: High School
- Motto: "Semper Ad Summum"
- Established: 1956
- Principal: Mrs. Sherri Duggan
- Grades: 9-12
- Enrollment: 667
- Colors: Red and White
- Mascot: Westley the Wolverine
- Website: West Kings District High School

West Kings District High School is a high-school located in Auburn, Kings County, Nova Scotia, Canada that was officially opened on Friday October 5, 1956 with a first year's enrollment of 457. Current enrollment is 667 students.

== Extracurricular activities ==
Activities that are offered at West Kings High School are diverse. Student council is a popular extracurricular that incorporates the following committees; Broadcast, Campus Store, Dance, Environmental, Fine Arts, Grad, Healthy Living, Spirit, TADD (Teens Against Drunk and Distracted Driving) and Yearbook. Athletics are also popular; at West Kings they are a division two school and offer co-ed football (Central Kings), hockey, volleyball, soccer, badminton, rugby, cross country, track and field, unified basketball and basketball.
