= Annapolis West Education Centre =

Location
- 100 Champlain Drive; Annapolis Royal, Nova Scotia; Canada
- Coordinates: 44°44′27″N 65°30′10″W

Information
- Type: High School
- Principal: June Brown (2023-2024)
- Principal: Allan Birch (2023-2024)
- Grades: 6-12
- Enrollment: 280
- Hours in school day: Monday-Friday (9:10AM-3:30PM)
- Colour: Red/White/Black
- Mascot: Wolf

Annapolis West Education Centre is a combined middle and high school in Annapolis Royal, Annapolis County, Nova Scotia, Canada.

== See also ==
- List of schools in Nova Scotia
