= Cape Breton – Victoria Regional Centre for Education =

Canadian school district

Cape Breton-Victoria Regional Center for Education

Location
- Sydney, Nova Scotia Canada

District information
- Regional Executive Director of Education: Susan Kelley
- Schools: 38

Students and staff
- Students: 13,004 (2015-16)

Other information
- Website: https://cbvrce.ca/home/

The Cape Breton-Victoria Regional Centre for Education (formerly the Cape Breton-Victoria School Board) is the public school district that provides educational services for approximately 13,000 students as of 2015-16 in more than 56 elementary, junior high, and high schools, as well as 185 adult learners in four adult education centres. These schools are located in the counties of Cape Breton, and Victoria in Cape Breton, Nova Scotia, Canada.

On January 23, 2018, education consultant Avis Glaze presented a report on the province's school system to government that included the recommendation that the seven elected regional school boards become regional education offices overseen by an appointed provincial advisory council. On January 24, 2018, the provincial government announced it accepted the recommendation and the Cape Breton-Victoria Regional School Board and six other school boards would be dissolved though no date for dissolution was then announced. The elected school board was dissolved on March 31, 2018.

== See also ==
- List of Nova Scotia schools
- Education in Canada
