= Cambridge, Kings County, Nova Scotia =

Community in Nova Scotia, Canada

Cambridge (Cambridge Station)
- Location within Nova Scotia
- Coordinates: 45°03′N 64°38′W
- Country: Canada
- Province: Nova Scotia
- Municipality: West Hants

Population (2021)
  - Total: 703
  - Change (2016-2021): ▼−18.9%

Cambridge is an unincorporated community on the Cornwallis River in Kings County, Nova Scotia, Canada, located 12 kilometres west of Kentville. It is administratively part of the village of Cornwallis Square. According to one source, the community was named after Cambridge, England. while another holds it was named for Cambridge, Massachusetts.

== History ==
The community first appears on maps about 1795. A large estate by the Marshall Family along the old post road (later Highway No. 1) was the first major farm in the area. The first school in 1867, followed by successively larger schools including one of the province's first consolidated rural high schools, Central Kings Rural High in 1952. A separate part of the village grew up around the railway north of Highway No. 1, known until the late 20th century as "Cambridge Station" The arrival of the Windsor and Annapolis Railway in 1869 stimulated trade and farming. The first apple warehouse was built in 1885, one of the first in Nova Scotia, joined by two others and an apple evaporator and canning plant. A Mi'kmaw reserve was founded just north of the station in 1880 and is today known as the Annapolis Valley First Nation. Railway service ended in January 1990 when the Dominion Atlantic Railway was abandoned west of Coldbrook, Nova Scotia and the tracks were removed in March 1990.

== Today ==
Cambridge is home to an elementary school (Cambridge and District Elementary), a regional high school (Central Kings Rural High), and the Kings County Christian School. It is also technically home to the Waterville/Kings County Municipal Airport and Waterville Michelin tire plant. Cambridge is also home to the Annapolis Valley First Nation Reserve which was formally known as Cambridge Indian Reserve No.32.

== Demographics ==
In the 2021 Census of Population conducted by Statistics Canada, Cambridge had a population of 703 living in 280 of its 288 total private dwellings, a change of −18.9% from its 2016 population of 867. With a land area of 3.77 km^{2} (1.46 sq mi), it had a population density of 186.5/km^{2} (483.0/sq mi) in 2021.
