= Education Reform (2018) Act =

Educational reform in Nova Scotia

The Nova Scotia Education Reform Act 2018 (Bill 72) was an act of educational administrative reform passed by the Legislative Assembly of Nova Scotia in March 2018. The act dissolved Nova Scotia's seven English language School Boards and replaced them with Regional Centres for Education. This shifted responsibility for educational services in Nova Scotia from locally elected boards to a council of administrators appointed directly by the Minister of Education.

== Background ==
Bill 72 was passed at a time of significant tension between elected school board members and the Nova Scotia Teachers' Union (NSTU), and the Liberal Government of Premier Stephen McNeil. Funding for educational services, responsibilities and working conditions of teachers, and jurisdiction over educational policies were the principle issues behind the conflict.

Over the course of 2016 contract negotiations between the NSTU and Provincial Government repeatedly broke down, culminating in Minister of Education Karen Casey closing all public schools for a day. The union followed with work to rule action for several weeks. Premier McNeil rejected the NSTU's position as financially impractical, while Union President Liette Ducette cited lack of effective attendance and student discipline policies as contributing factors in the job action. In early February 2017 the members of the NSTU rejected a draft collective agreement presented to them by Minister Casey. In response, the McNeill Government announced its intentions to enforce a contract on the union.

== Bill 75 ==
The enforced contract, known as Bill 75, ended the union's work-to-rule action and imposed most of the conditions contained in the draft agreement rejected earlier. In response, the NSTU engaged in a one-day strike action, the first in the union's 122-year history. The bill was seen as controversial and possibly illegal and was rejected by both opposition parties, but as McNeil held a majority government Bill 75 was passed by the Legislative Assembly of Nova Scotia on February 21, 2017.

In voting against it, Leader of the Opposition Jamie Baillie stated that “By his reckless actions, the premier has committed the taxpayers of Nova Scotia to years of legal challenges and millions of dollars in legal costs.” Baillie pointed out that similar bills in British Columbia and Ontario had been overturned, resulting in millions of dollars in lawsuits.

The union immediately challenged Bill 75 in court. Although premier McNeil stated his confidence in its legality, in June 2022 Nova Scotia Supreme Court Justice John Keith ruled the bill was unconstitutional, its implementation "terribly wrong," and that it weakened the union's ability to be involved in classroom improvements. A poll of the Nova Scotia public in 2018 found that 66% of Nova Scotians felt that Bill 75 had a negative impact on public education in the province.

== The Glaze Report ==
Seven months after passing Bill 75, the McNeil Government hired educational consultant Avis Glaze to review the administration of schools in Nova Scotia. In January 2018 she released her suggestions in "Raise the Bar: A Coherent and Responsive Education Administrative System for Nova Scotia" ("The Glaze Report"). The report suggested several changes to the administration of educational services, the most significant of which was that the province's seven English language locally elected school boards be dissolved and replaced with new administrative bodies managed directly by the province. To offset loss of local involvement in education, responsibility for student assessment would be removed from the Department of Education and entrusted to a newly formed Student Progress Assessment Office (SPAO), which would report directly to the public.

Apart from dissolving elected boards and establishing an SPAO, Glaze also suggested that Principals and Vice-Principals no longer be permitted in the teachers' union. Newly appointed Minister of Education Zach Churchill indicated in January 2018 that his government would accept Glaze's recommendations.

The Education Reform Act 2018 (Bill 72) was passed in April of that year.

== Bill 72 ==
In April 2018 locally elected English school boards in Nova Scotia were dissolved and replaced with provincially run centres for education, and administrators were removed from the NSTU. The Student Progress Assessment Office (SPAO) was never formed.

PISA assessment scores in Nova Scotia were significantly lower in 2022 compared to 2018. Various factors, such as COVID-19 disruptions, contributed to a general reduction in PISA scores globally, but Nova Scotia declined more than the Canadian average, with students achieving 24 fewer points on math tests, the second greatest drop in the country.
