= International Stand Up to Bullying Day =

Anti-bullying event

International STAND UP to Bullying Day is a special semi-annual event in which participants sign and wear a pink "pledge shirt" to take a visible, public stance against bullying. The event takes place in schools, workplaces, and organizations in 25 countries around the globe on the third Friday of November to coincide with Anti-Bullying Week, and then again on the last Friday of February.

== History ==
The first International STAND UP to Bullying Day took place in February 2008. 236 schools, workplaces and organizations representing more than 125,000 students and staff registered to take a STAND against bullying by signing and wearing a special pink pledge shirt.

== Host ==
Each participating school, workplace or organization hosts their own STAND with aid being provided by event coordinators Bully Help Initiatives, a Canada-based organization committed to developing effective support structures for victims of bullying through a variety of initiatives.

== Pink Shirts ==
Participation in the STAND constitutes the signing and wearing of a special pink pledge shirt. Signing and wearing this shirt identifies a peer based support structure to victims and their bullies in a non-confrontational way. The color of the shirts is based on a campaign started by Travis Price and David Shepherd, two students who took a stand for a fellow student who was bullied for wearing a pink shirt to school.
