= Coldbrook, Nova Scotia =

Community in Nova Scotia, Canada

Coldbrook
- Settlement
- Nickname: Land of skies
- Location of Coldbrook in Nova Scotia
- Coordinates: 45°03′N 64°35′W
- Country: Canada
- Province: Nova Scotia
- County: Kings County
- Elevation: 24 m (79 ft)

Population (2021)
  - Total: 1,206
  - Change (2016-2021): ▼−4.6%

Coldbrook is a Canadian suburban community in Kings County, Nova Scotia. At the 2021 census, the population was 1,206.

== History ==
A large farm in the area was named "Colebrook" after a community in Wales, but the village became known as Cold Brook Station in 1869 when the Windsor and Annapolis Railway arrived. The railway led to growth of two saw mills and a large apple export warehouse built in 1908 as well as a bulk oil depot in the late 1920s for White Rose Gasoline. The United Fruit Companies apple growers co-op built a pair of large warehouses and a processing plant at Coldbrook in 1946. This plant later became the Scotian Gold Co-operative plant in 1957, which remains a large employer at its plant and retail store. Coldbrook became the "end of track" for the Dominion Atlantic Railway in March 1990 when the line abandoned all of its tracks west of Coldbrook. Rail service ended completely in 1993.

== Demographics ==
Coldbrook part A

In the 2021 Census of Population conducted by Statistics Canada, Coldbrook part A had a population of 233 living in 112 of its 112 total private dwellings, a change of −2.9% from its 2016 population of 240. With a land area of 2.18 km^{2} (0.84 sq mi), it had a population density of 106.9/km^{2} (276.8/sq mi) in 2021.

Coldbrook part B

In the 2021 Census of Population conducted by Statistics Canada, Coldbrook part B had a population of 973 living in 388 of its 399 total private dwellings, a change of −5.1% from its 2016 population of 1,025. With a land area of 4.94 km^{2} (1.91 sq mi), it had a population density of 197.0/km^{2} (510.1/sq mi) in 2021.

Together, they had a combined population of 1,206. This was a -4.6% decrease compared to the combined population from 5 years prior.
