= Auburn, Nova Scotia =

Community in Nova Scotia, Canada

Coordinates: 45°1′3″N 64°51′47″W

Auburn in Nova Scotia

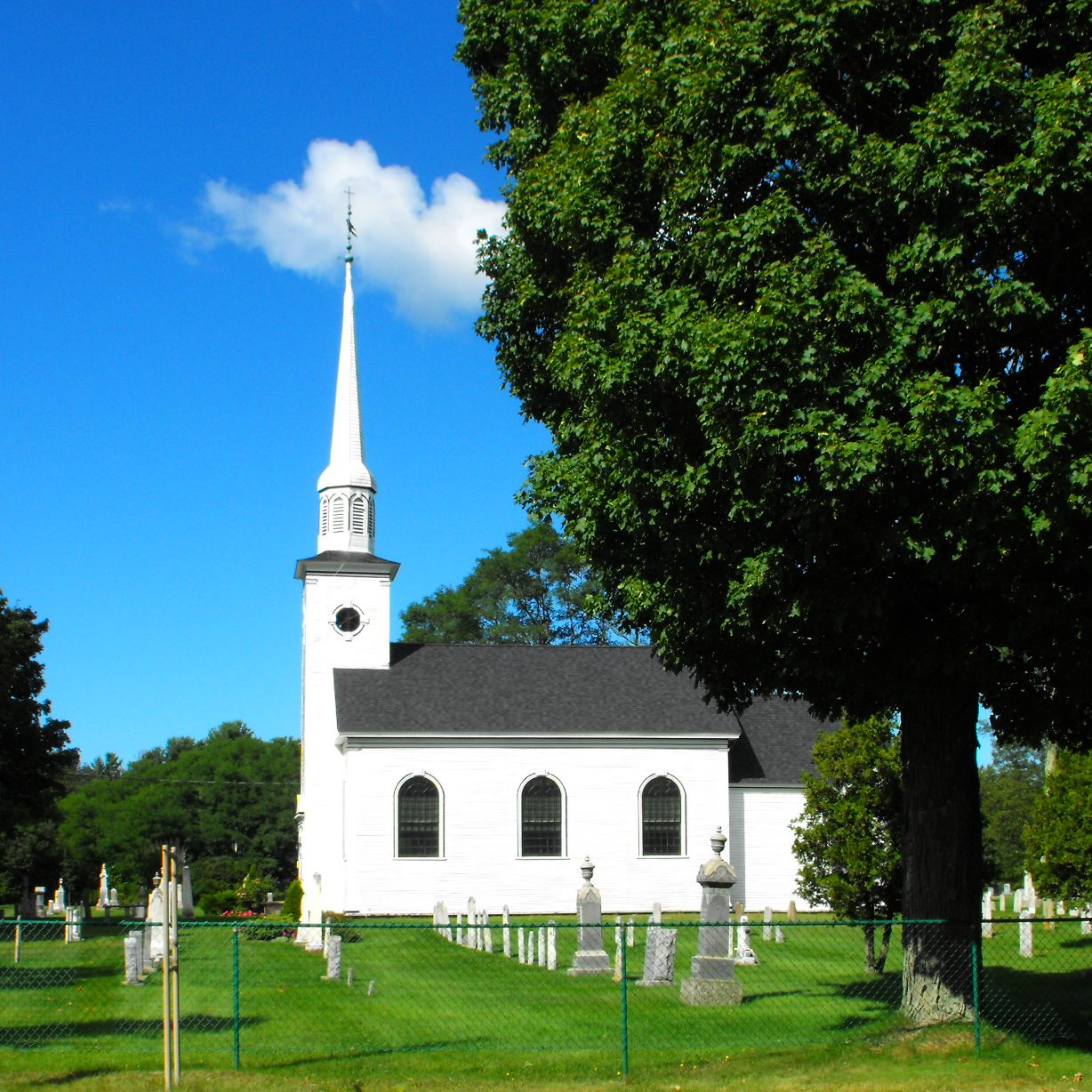
St. Mary's Anglican Church is a notable landmark in Auburn, Nova Scotia

Auburn is a community in the Canadian province of Nova Scotia, located west of Aylesford in Kings County. The second oldest Anglican church in Nova Scotia is situated there, consecrated in 1790 by Bishop Inglis. Modelled on Christopher Wren's London church designs, St. Mary's Anglican Church is known as "The Little Wren Church". Complete with a Palladian window over the chancel, it most closely resembles St James's Church, Piccadilly.
