= HMCS Acadia =

Badge of HMCS Acadia

Several Canadian naval units have been named HMCS Acadia.

- CSS Acadia is Canada's most historic oceanographic and hydrographic survey and research vessel. She was commissioned into naval service as HMCS Acadia (I) during both the First and Second World Wars, while serving with her civilian name before and after each conflict. She is currently a museum ship docked during the summer months at the Maritime Museum of the Atlantic in Halifax, Nova Scotia.
- CSTC HMCS Acadia (II) was a cadet summer training centre operated by the Royal Canadian Sea Cadets that had used the unit name Acadia from 1956–2019. It was located at Cornwallis, Nova Scotia.
