= HMCS Micmac =

Destroyer of the Royal Canadian Navy

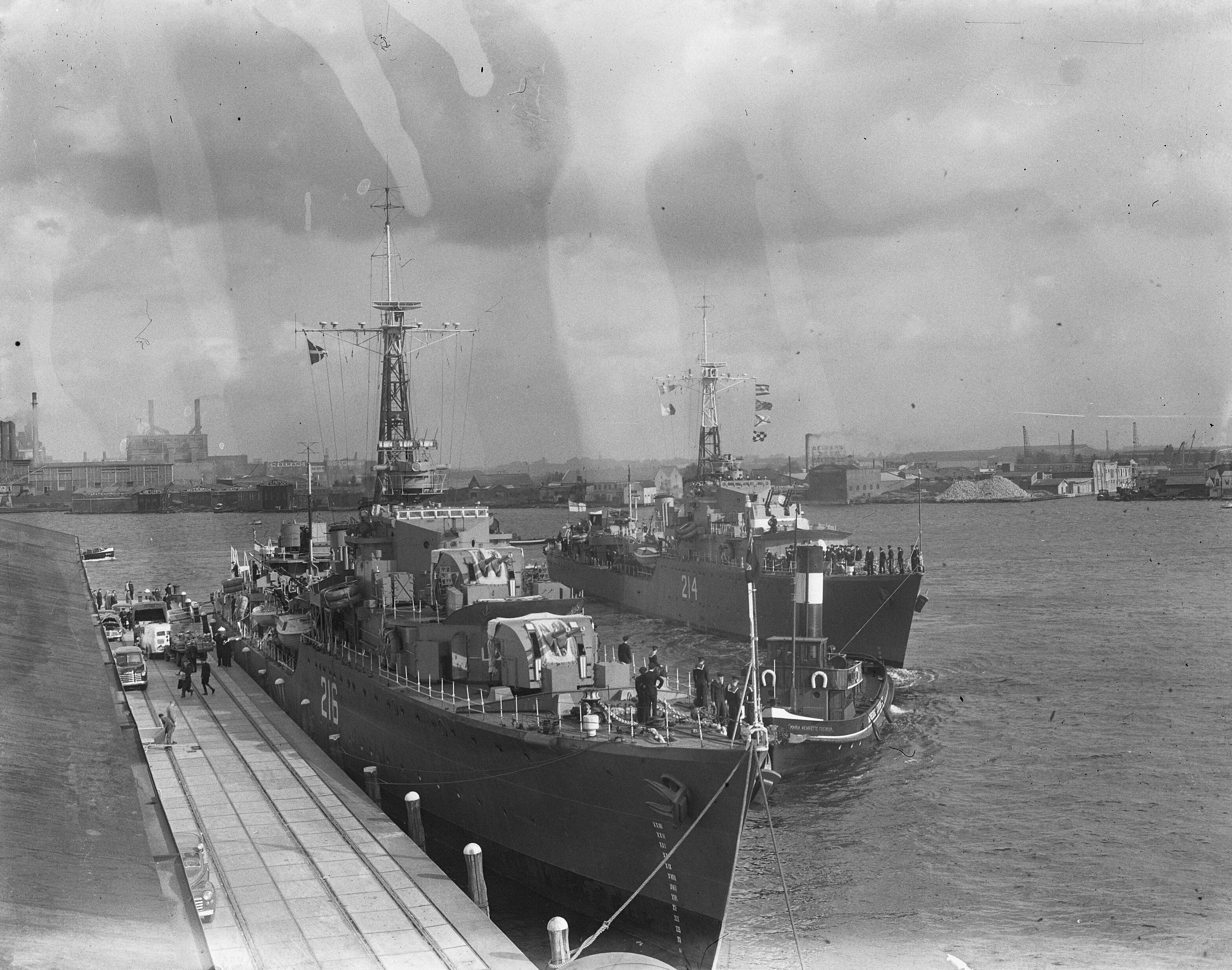
- Micmac behind Huron

History

Canada
- Name: Micmac
- Namesake: Mi'kmaq nation
- Ordered: 4 January 1941
- Builder: Halifax Shipyards
- Cost: $8,500,000.00 CAD
- Yard number: 12
- Laid down: 20 May 1942
- Launched: 18 September 1943
- Commissioned: 18 September 1945
- Decommissioned: 31 March 1964
- In service: 1945–47, 1949–51, 1953–64
- Out of service: 1947–49, 1951–53
- Reclassified: 1951
- Refit: 1947–1949, 1951–1953
- Stricken: 31 March 1964
- Home port: Halifax
- Identification: Pennant number: R10, DDE 214
- Motto: Melkedae; ([Mi'kmaq]: "Fearless")
- Fate: Broken up 1965.
- Notes: Colours: Gold and royal blue
- Badge: Blazon Azure, a fern erect or

General characteristics
- Class & type: Tribal-class destroyer
- Displacement: 1,927 long tons (1,958 t) (standard); 2,745 long tons (2,789 t) (full load)
- Length: 355 ft 5 in (108.33 m) pp; 366 ft 6 in (111.71 m) wl; 377 ft 0 in (114.91 m) oa
- Beam: 37 ft 5 in (11.40 m)
- Draught: 9 ft 0 in (2.74 m) (standard), 13 ft 0 in (3.96 m) (full load)
- Propulsion: 3 × Admiralty 3-drum boilers at 300lb/sq.in; 2 × Parsons geared turbines, two shafts – 44,000 shp (33,000 kW)
- Speed: 36.5 knots (67.6 km/h; 42.0 mph)
- Range: 5,700 nmi (10,600 km; 6,600 mi) at 15 kn (28 km/h; 17 mph)
- Complement: 190–240
- Armament: As built; 3 × twin 4.7 in(120mm)/45 QF Mk XII; 1 × twin 4 in (102 mm)/45 QF Mk XVI (HA); 2 × twin 40 mm Bofors RP.50 Mk V; 2 × single 40 mm Bofors Mk VII; 2 × twin 20 mm Oerlikon Mk VC; 1 × quad 21 inch (533 mm) torpedoes (Mk IX); 1953 refit; 2 × twin 4 in (102 mm)/45 QF Mk XVI (HA); 1 × twin 3 in (76 mm) Mk 22 (HA); 4 x single 40 mm Bofors Boffin; 1 × quad 21 inch (533 mm) torpedoes (Mk IX); 2 × triple 12 in (305 mm) Squid anti-submarine mortars

HMCS Micmac was a Tribal-class destroyer which served the Royal Canadian Navy from 1945 to 1964. Micmac was the first modern, high-performance warship built in Canada. She was the first of four Tribal destroyers built at the Halifax Shipyard and one of eight Tribal-class destroyers to serve in the Royal Canadian Navy.

== Background ==
Micmac was one of 27 Tribal-class destroyers completed for the Royal Navy (RN), the Royal Australian Navy (RAN), and the Royal Canadian Navy. She was the lead ship of the Canadian wartime Tribal Destroyer program, followed by sister ships HMCS Nootka, HMCS Cayuga and HMCS Athabaskan.

Ordered in early 1941 she did not commission until late 1945, after the end of hostilities. Micmac's construction, taking 57 months from the date of order to the date of commission; about twice that of Tribals built elsewhere. For example Micmac's Australian-built sister, HMAS Warramunga—ordered by the RAN in September 1939, laid down on 10 February 1940, launched on 7 February 1942, and commissioned on 23 November 1942—took but 29 months while the twenty Tribals constructed for the RN (16) and RCN (4) in British yards averaged but 26 months from the date of order to the date of commission. Micmac's delay was due to economic and political issues that permeated the entire Canadian Destroyer Project.

=== Economic issues ===
Economically, Canada's overall limited industrial capacity was a major factor. Tribal class fleet destroyers hull construction required a high-tensile (HT) specialty steel that was neither made in Canada nor available for purchase from the United States. Steel which Great Britain, overtaxed by the growing demands of a general European war, could not provide and that Canadian mills proved slow to produce.

The hulls of low performance corvettes and frigates, designed to merchant ship standards and powered by triple expansion steam engines, could be built from the mild steel readily available from Canadian sources. However, high performance warships, like destroyers, require hulls built as light as practical to obtain the maximum speed possible from the available power plant whilst still carrying a useful armament. A strong yet lightweight hull requires high-strength steel and such speciality steel of the exact specification required for a Tribal hull simply was not to be had from North American sources when Micmac was ordered.

The propulsion plant required for a Tribal was also unavailable from Britain. And the Canadian order for Micmac's machinery was a first in class effort for the designated manufacturer. Turbine engines of the size and complexity required by the Tribals never before had been built in Canada. Further, at the time Micmac's engines were ordered, the primary contractor, John Inglis and Company, was itself in considerable administrative difficulty arising from the increased demands of wartime procurement. The serious impact of this situation may be grasped when one considers that Micmac's hull was completed in Halifax after 32 months but the ship had to wait another full year for the delivery of her machinery from Inglis in Toronto before her fitting out could commence.

=== Civil political issues ===
The selection of Halifax Shipyard for the construction of the first Canadian-made Tribal destroyer was made by Canada's Minister of Defence for Naval Services, Angus L. Macdonald. MacDonald was both a Nova Scotia native and a former Premier of that province, an office he would re-occupy after the war's end until his death in 1954, a political connection that did not go unnoticed.

Building a high performance warship is a complex undertaking that all too often strains the capabilities of experienced shipbuilders. Even when all the requisite materials and technical facilities are readily available difficulties abound. While Canada had few such enterprises in 1941, some did exist, notably the larger and more experienced Vickers yards in Montreal. However a smaller and less equipped shipyard, Halifax Shipyards Limited, was selected for the Canadian Tribal program that began with Micmac.

At the outbreak of war in 1939 Halifax Shipyard, located in Halifax, Nova Scotia, was distant from the major industrial centre of Canada. The city had a modest population and an even more modest industrial capacity. Further, from 1940 until the end of the war the limited, albeit increasing, technical facilities and skilled labour force available to Halifax Shipyard were necessarily concentrated upon repair and refit of ships damaged in innumerable Atlantic convoys departing from Bedford Basin. Thus, competition for such limited resources as were available was intense. Halifax, between 1940 and 1945, was one of the busiest and most congested ports in the world and the Halifax Shipyard was already working at capacity handling repair work for Atlantic convoy ships damaged in transit.

While no shipyard in Canada had ever constructed a ship that even approached the complexity of a modern destroyer, Halifax Shipyard had limited experience even by Canadian standards. While the Halifax Shipyard had built four large freighters at the end of the First World War as well as an advanced icebreaker, Micmac's yard number, hull No. 12, indicates just how few hulls the yard had constructed.

However the selection of the Halifax yard also had several advantages. While Halifax Shipyards had not produced a large number of ships, it had produced some advanced and successful vessels. Two of its 1920 refrigerated freighters, SS Canadian Cruiser and SS Canadian Constructor were very large by Canadian standards, and remained the largest Canadian steel ships built until the end of the war. The icebreaker built by the yard, CGS N.B. McLean was a powerful and long-serving ship as well as one of the largest icebreakers in the world when constructed. The Halifax yard also benefited from the proximity of naval staff at the RCN's Halifax Naval Dockyard adjoining just to the south of the Halifax Shipyard. Finally, an important consideration for the wartime operation of the crucial convoy port of Halifax was the destroyer program's retention of a skilled workforce which helped stabilize the repair capacity of the port. Demand for skilled shipyard works soared in the winter but fell off in the summer causing many workers to leave. The destroyer program kept a large year round workforce available that could be switch from repair to new ship construction as needed.,

=== Service politics ===
The selection of the extremely advanced Tribal design for domestic construction was specifically that of the Chief of the Naval Staff, Admiral P.W. Nelles who was influenced by institutional considerations for the future of the RCN.

It is recalled that the RCN was only established in 1910 and then primarily as a ploy by Laurier's Liberal administration to avoid paying for British dreadnoughts. (Note: See Naval Service Act.) Following the First World War, the RCN was progressively reduced in strength until by 1922 its very survival as an independent service was placed at risk. (Note: See Royal Canadian Navy during the Interwar period.) This experience had some influence on members of the Naval Staff who were determined to forestall any possible re-occurrence at the end of the Second World War.

Nelles' evident design was to employ the funding opportunities afforded by the conflict in Europe to establish the post-war RCN as a major, and therefore permanent, part of Canada's defence strategy. Obtaining the necessary infrastructure to support a 'big ship' fleet and the technical know-how to do so in the vicinity of the Navy's home port of Halifax was crucial to that endeavour.

Such was the incongruity of the policy choices made with respect to the Canadian Tribal program that it appeared to some contemporary observers, both in and out of the RCN, that while obtaining the means to build a destroyer was claimed vital for the war effort, the actual construction of a destroyer evidently was somewhat less so.

== Construction and career ==
Micmac was launched on 18 September 1943, named in honour of the Mi'kmaq people of the Maritime provinces, continuing the tradition of naming Canadian Tribal-class destroyers after Canadian First Nations. After many difficulties, especially the delayed arrival of the propulsion system from Inglis in Toronto, Micmac was commissioned on 18 September 1945, captained by Lieutenant Commander R.L. Hennessy, DSC, RCN. Although the war she was intended for had ended the previous May, Micmac was nonetheless the very first destroyer ever constructed in Canada. At an estimated cost of $8,500,000.00 CAD, roughly four times what it cost the RN to build a Tribal, she was also the single most expensive piece of military or naval equipment produced in Canada up to that time. Commissioned into a rapidly shrinking navy, the crew of the brand new destroyer completed her workups and the ship entered into the routine existence of a peacetime navy while dozens of older RCN ships were paid off into reserve or to disposal. Her surviving tribal sisters in the Royal Navy were themselves all paid off to disposal in 1945 and scrapped by 1949 but Canada and Australia would find new uses for Tribal destroyers as Cold War naval confrontations emerged.

=== Collision ===
In March 1947, Micmac received a new commanding officer, LCdr. J. C. Littler, RCN, (Cdr. from 1-7-47) and entered a yard period at HMC Dockyard Halifax to refit and upgrade her automatic weapons. Early in the morning of 16 July 1947, Micmac embarked a number of civilian contractors and proceeded to sea from Halifax to conduct full-power trials off Sambro Head. Shortly after the trials completed, just before 13:00 hrs, HMCS Micmac was in collision with the Victory ship SS Yarmouth County (ex-Fort Astoria). Although damage to the Yarmouth County was slight and none of her crew were injured, Micmac suffered 15 injured and five dead. Five more crewmen, together with a civilian dock worker, were also lost at sea and presumed dead.

Micmac's upper works, forward of the bridge, were extensively damaged. 'A' mount together with its guns was completely destroyed. Moreover, she lost 40 feet of bow, her hull was badly deformed on the port side, and her keel was broken just under 'B' mount. Although the collision was later blamed on navigational errors, the incident led Montreal newspapers to point fingers at the wartime shipbuilding program. Despite the damage, it was decided to take Micmac in hand for reconstruction as a destroyer escort along with her six surviving sisters. After extensive, albeit temporary, repairs and partial conversion, Micmac recommissioned on 16 November 1949, LCdr. F. C. Frewer, RCN, commanding. However, Micmac's interim repairs did not extend to her broken keel; a state which compromised her structural integrity. Because of this her forward hull could not withstand the deck thrust produced by the recoil of the four 4"/45 HA guns that were planned for her DDE conversion. In consequence Micmac was instead fitted with a single Squid Mk IV triple barrel ASW mortar in the 'A' mount position and a single 40mm Bofors quad mount in the 'B' mount position. All her 4.7" guns were removed and a twin 4"/45 HA mount was shipped in Y position. This configuration gave Micmac a distinctive, if decidedly odd-looking, profile.

=== DDE conversion ===
On 30 November 1951 Micmac again paid off, this time to complete her conversion to the new DDE Tribal configuration. During this conversion her broken keel was finally made good and the forward armament was returned to a conventional arrangement of four 4"/45 HA guns in two twin mounts. Micmac recommissioned as DDE 214 on 14 August 1953, Cdr. G. M. Wadds, RCN, commanding, but did not complete her workups until September of the following year.

Because of her hull damage and prolonged refit Micmac was not considered for operations in the Korean War. As she was completed too late to see service in WWII and was unavailable for deployment at the time of the Korean War, Micmac has the distinction of being the only one of the 27 members of her class never to fire a shot in anger. Instead, her service years were spent as a training ship and sometime guard ship to the aircraft carrier HMCS Magnificent.

In common with the rest of her class, Micmac did not age well. Originally designed to counter enlarged French, German, and Italian inter-war destroyer classes—therefore intended primarily for service in the relatively sheltered waters of the Mediterranean and North Seas—the remarkably heavy armament and very high speed of the Tribal class were purchased at the cost of extremely light hull construction. The transverse strength design of the class, coupled with light hull plating, therefore lacked sufficient longitudinal stability and proved far too flexible and weak in North Atlantic service. In the absence of longitudinal strength members the increased strength of high tensile steel plate could not entirely compensate for its simple lack of mass. Consequently, ships of this class proved particularly susceptible to structural damage when operating at speed. They also frequently suffered machinery casualties due to excessive hull flexure in heavy seas. (Note: See notes to entry for November 1939. Gordon Smith, ed., HMS Gurkha(i) (L 20) – Tribal-class Destroyer including Convoy Escort Movements)

== Retirement ==
Hull cracks, feed water and fuel tank leaks, structural failures and turbine damage were a commonplace in Tribals even when they were new. Successive ship alterations which addressed these issues with stiffener plates, frames, stringers, braces and even turbine blade redesign had limited success. Likely it was this consideration which influenced the RN's decision to dispose of their four surviving Tribal destroyers before 1950 even though none of those ships were then more than 12 years old. As the years passed all of Canada's Tribals, both British and Canadian built, developed more frequent and more extensive structural defects necessitating increasingly long yard time for repairs and restrictions placed on their employment. Eventually, the growing cost of their maintenance and their demands on the Navy's restricted manpower no longer could be justified by their decreased capabilities. Thus, in late 1963 the RCN decided to retire the entire class. Micmac finally paid off to disposal in March 1964 along with her sisters. She was sold and in 1965 went to the ship breakers at Faslane, Scotland.

The original Micmac's ship's bell is installed on the mast of HMCS Acadia Sea Cadet training centre at the Cornwallis Park training facility near Digby, Nova Scotia. HMCS Acadia was the gunnery training ship assigned to HMCS Cornwallis from 1944 to the end of hostilities. (By coincidence, HMCS Acadia had been commanded by the same LCdr. Littler who captained Micmac at the time of her collision.) In the 1970s the name Micmac was allocated to the Sea Cadet Summer Training Centre located on the lower section of CFB Shearwater. Of the five General Training divisions at HMCS Acadia, one is named Micmac. All of the RCN Tribal-class ship's names have at various times been assigned to training divisions of officer cadets at the former Royal Roads Military College.

One Canadian Tribal-class destroyer, the British-built HMCS Haida, survives as a museum ship docked in Hamilton, Ontario.

== See also ==
- List of current ships of the Royal Canadian Navy
