= Clementsport =

Community in Nova Scotia, Canada

Coordinates: 44°40′1.44″N 65°36′38.5″W

Clementsport in Nova Scotia

Clementsport is a community in the Canadian province of Nova Scotia, located in Annapolis County. It is on the southern shore of the Annapolis Basin and is on Nova Scotia Trunk 1.

The village was established originally as Clements Township by United Empire Loyalists from Long Island, NY, who came to the region at the end of the American Revolution, c. 1785. Its original boundaries extended southwest to the Bear River, south to what was originally called the Hessian Line and is now the Clementsvale Road, and northeast as far as Allain's Creek at the edge of Annapolis Royal. This area included what is now the village of Deep Brook, the village of Cornwallis Park on the site of the former CFB Cornwallis, and Upper Clements Parks. Several homes and churches in the village date to the late 18th and early 19th century.

Formerly an industrial town, Clementsport was the site of extensive wooden shipbuilding, and had an iron smelting factory and dock-works at the mouth of the Moose River. Stores and residences were built out over the river on wooden pilings and stilts, similar to the still-existing structures in the nearby village of Bear River.

The decline of wooden shipbuilding led to the decline of the town, and none of the structures that were built over the river remain. More recent economic decline in the region has led to the closure of several local businesses, including a gas station, convenience stores, a pizzeria, art galleries, and a bed and breakfast.

Clementsport is situated on the Annapolis Basin, along the Moose River. It is at roughly the half-way point between Annapolis Royal and Digby, along Highway 1.
