= Chameau =

Chameau (French for "camel") may refer to:

- Jean-Lou Chameau (born 1953), civil engineer and president of the California Institute of Technology
- French ship Chameau, a sailing ship that sank in 1725
- Chameau, an armed French vessel captured by HMS Cerberus (1794) in 1804 during the Napoleonic Wars
- Chameau, les Saintes, a mountain on Terre-de-Haut Island in the Caribbean Sea
- Chameau Island, near Antarctica
- Le Chameau, a mountain on Koh Rong Sanloem, a Cambodian island
- Chameau, a method of reducing a ship's draught with flotation tanks - see Gun port
