= HMCS Sans Peur =

History
- Name: Trenora; Sans Peur
- Owner: Ernest G. Stanley; George Sutherland-Leveson-Gower, 5th Duke of Sutherland
- Port of registry: United Kingdom (1933–1939)
- Builder: John I. Thornycroft & Company, Woolston, Southampton, UK
- Yard number: 1115
- Launched: 11 May 1933
- Completed: August 1933
- In service: 1933
- Out of service: 1939
- Fate: Acquired by Royal Canadian Navy

Canada
- Name: Sans Peur
- Acquired: 1939
- Commissioned: 3 March 1940
- Decommissioned: 31 January 1947
- Fate: Sold for commercial service 1947
- Name: Trenora; Sans Peur
- Port of registry: Panama
- In service: 1947

General characteristics in naval service
- Type: Armed yacht
- Displacement: 856 long tons (870 t)
- Length: 210 ft (64.0 m)
- Beam: 30 ft (9.1 m)
- Draught: 13 ft (4.0 m)
- Propulsion: 2 shafts; 2 × Polar Atlas diesel engines
- Speed: 13 knots (24 km/h; 15 mph)
- Complement: 48
- Sensors & processing systems: Type 123 asdic
- Armament: 1 × 4 in (102 mm) gun; 1 × 12-pounder gun; 40 mm anti-aircraft gun; 25 depth charges

HMCS Sans Peur was an armed yacht that served with the Royal Canadian Navy (RCN) during World War II on both coasts. The vessel was constructed as a yacht in 1933 for Ernest G. Stanley at the John I. Thornycroft & Company yard in Woolston, Southampton, United Kingdom and initially named Trenora. It was sold in the 1930s to George Sutherland-Leveson-Gower, 5th Duke of Sutherland who renamed it Sans Peur. The yacht was taken over by the RCN in 1939 and used for anti-submarine patrols and training duties on the British Columbia Coast. In 1944, Sans Peur was brought east to Nova Scotia as a training ship.

The RCN intended to keep Sans Peur in the postwar era, but budget cuts forced the service to dispose of the ship in 1947. Sans Peur was first acquired by a company from Montreal before being resold to a Panamanian company in 1948, which renamed the vessel Trenora. The vessel was reconverted to a yacht at Gibraltar and acquired by an Italian family in the shipping trade. In 1972, Trenora was sold again to Japanese buyers who renamed the vessel Sans Peur. In 1975, the vessel was used as VIP accommodations during an event at Okinawa. The vessel's fate is unknown.

== Description ==
Sans Peur was designed as a yacht to a modified structure. The ship was planned with a low-strength main deck and upper superstructure carried on stanchions. This made the upper level boat deck the new strength deck. This diversion from traditional yacht structure led to disagreements with Lloyd's Register assessors for insurance purposes. The changes were only deemed acceptable after the intervention of the chief surveyor who granted a dispensation to the existing rules. The yacht was powered by twin Polar Atlas diesel engines with a cruising speed of 12 1/2 knots (23.2 km/h; 14.4 mph) for 7,000 nautical miles (13,000 km; 8,100 mi) with a top speed of 16 knots (30 km/h; 18 mph), with two propeller shafts. The yacht was 210 ft (64.0 m) long with a beam of 30 ft (9.1 m) and a draught of 13 ft (4.0 m). Trenora was measured at 856 gross register tons (GRT).

== Service history ==
The yacht was ordered for construction from John I. Thornycroft & Company at their yard in Woolston, Southampton, United Kingdom by Dr. Ernest G. Stanley, a nephew of Rudyard Kipling. The vessel's yard number was 1115 and the ship was launched on 11 May 1933. Completed in August 1933, the vessel was named Trenora by Stanley and was acquired by him to help support the lagging shipbuilding industry during the Great Depression. George Sutherland-Leveson-Gower, 5th Duke of Sutherland purchased Trenora in the 1930s and renamed the vessel Sans Peur after the motto of Clan Sutherland. The Duke of Sutherland used Sans Peur to visit his business holdings in British Columbia while on a world cruise with a friend. While cruising off California in 1939, Sans Peur grounded on a sandbank. The ship had grounded off Espiritu Santo Island in the Gulf of California. The vessel's captain had managed to refloat Sans Peur and anchor it, but a hole had been opened in the bottom and the ship lay partly flooded. With the aid of the tugboat Retriever, the vessel was made sound and the ship resumed its journey. Sans Peur and the Duke of Sutherland was off the coast of British Columbia when World War II broke out. The duke turned his ship over to the British Admiralty at Vancouver in September 1939 and departed by train for eastern Canada to return to the UK.

=== Royal Canadian Navy service ===
To augment the local sea defences of East Coast ports, the Royal Canadian Navy (RCN) sought large, steel-hulled yachts to requisition. Sans Peur had been turned over to the Admiralty at the outset of the war by the Duke of Sutherland and formally requisitioned by the Admiralty in October. On 7 October, the British Admiralty offered Sans Peur to the Royal Canadian Navy. The offer was accepted and the yacht was taken into RCN on a charter from the British Ministry of War Transport, initially costing the Government of Canada 569 pounds, 10 shillings per month.

Conversion to an armed yacht involved removing most of the luxurious finery and installing naval hardware. As Sans Peur was the first to be converted to an armed yacht in Canadian service, the vessel was the first to be given Type 123 asdic. The yacht was strengthened both fore and aft for heavier guns and was given an additional 40 mm anti-aircraft gun. The forward gun was a 4-inch (102 mm) model that had been taken from a former Canadian destroyer. The rear gun was a 12-pounder gun. The ship was also given 25 depth charges. In 1941, the yacht was equipped with radar. Despite being one of the more capable armed yachts, Sans Peur did have drawbacks. Fuel tanks 3, 6 and 7 had to remain filled with fuel and if fuel was drawn from these tanks, water was pumped in to take its place. At first this caused issues as every time this happened the tanks had to be cleaned before new fuel could be put in. Later a method was developed where fuel was taken from the top of the tanks as water was pumped in through the bottom. Conversion to an armed yacht took until the end of 1939.

Sans Peur was the first yacht commissioned on 3 March 1940. (Note: Macpherson & Barrie give the commissioning date as 5 May 1940.) Sans Peur sailed on its first patrol on 11 March. Originally intended for local defence, the lack of capable Canadian ships led the armed yachts to be assigned to seaward patrol missions. The yacht was used to patrol along the British Columbia coast along with use as a gunnery and anti-aircraft gunnery training ship. After 1943, the yacht was also used as a radar training ship. After German merchant ships were captured in the Pacific by Canadian and British warships, Sans Peur was used to transport the German prisoners of war from the warships to British Columbia.

After the entry of Japan into the war, the threat to the west coast increased. On 7 June 1942, the Japanese submarine I-26 torpedoed and sank USAT Coastal Trader off Cape Flattery. The United States requested RCN aid and Sans Peur and the corvette Edmundston were dispatched. The two ships began searching for survivors and with the assistance of a Royal Canadian Air Force aircraft, Edmundston recovered the survivors. Later that month, on 20 June, I-26 shelled a lighthouse at Estevan Point on the British Columbia coast, Sans Peur was dispatched with the corvette Timmins to track and destroy the submarine. The Japanese submarine was not found as it had retreated.

As more capable vessels began pouring out of shipyards, the RCN began to rely less on Sans Peur and the other armed yachts for operational patrols. After November 1942, Sans Peur was used solely as a training vessel on the west coast. In April 1943, Sans Peur was purchased outright by Canada for $305,191. The yacht then underwent an extensive refit and in late 1943, after the threat from Japan had subsided on the west coast, the RCN decided to send Sans Peur east. Accompanied by New Glasgow, the two ships departed Esquimalt on 24 January 1944 and arrived at Halifax, Nova Scotia on 6 February via the Panama Canal. After arrival, Sans Peur was then sent to join HMCS Cornwallis, the naval training facility in the Annapolis Basin, where it joined seven other armed yachts. There the yacht took part in anti-submarine training with Royal Navy submarines. Sans Peur operated with the submarines HMS L23, Seawolf, Unseen and Upright. Additionally, the armed yachts stationed at Cornwallis would escort the ferry Princess Helen on the run between Saint John, New Brunswick and Digby, Nova Scotia after the sinking of Caribou.

=== Post war and commercial service ===
With the arrival of two Castle-class corvettes at Cornwallis to take over training duties in January 1946 following the end of the war, Sans Peur was sent to Halifax as a training ship and tender to the naval reserve division HMCS Scotian in February. The ship was used for bathythermographic testing in St. Margaret's Bay and training with the submarine HMS Token. During this period, the submarine L23 collided with Sans Peur, punching a hole in the side of the ship at Reed's Point, New Brunswick. As the Royal Canadian Navy's budget shrank in the postwar era Sans Peur was deemed surplus. The vessel was paid off the following year on 31 January 1947 and put up for sale.

Sans Peur was purchased by Maple Leaf Steamships of Montreal on 6 June 1947 but in 1948, was sold again. Registered under a Panamanian flag by the owners, Equipment & Supply Company from New York City, the ship reverted to its original name Trenora. The vessel sailed for the Mediterranean Sea, stopping in Gibraltar where Trenora was reconverted to a yacht by its original builders. Trenora was then acquired by the Ravano family, a family with shipping interests from Genoa. Trenora was used by the family as their personal yacht but also put up for charter with the Duke and Duchess of Windsor, Henry Ford and Count Marzotto all spending time aboard. In 1972, the yacht was put up for sale by the Ravano family and was acquired by Japanese buyers. They renamed the vessel Sans Peur and the yacht made its way out to Japan via the Panama Canal and Honolulu, Hawaii, arriving in May 1973. Shortly after the ship's arrival in Japan, it was sold to Hatsubaichi Kanko of Hiroshima. In mid-1975, Sans Peur was used as VIP accommodations during the Ocean Olympics at Okinawa.
