= Seabright, Nova Scotia =

Seabright
- Community
- Location within Nova Scotia
- Coordinates: 44°36′52″N 63°55′30″W
- Country: Canada
- Province: Nova Scotia
- Municipality: Halifax Regional Municipality
- Community council: Western Region Community Council
- Planning Area: St. Margarets Bay
- GNBC code: CBHRU

Seabright (population 522) is a community within the Halifax Regional Municipality Nova Scotia between French Village and Glen Margaret on Route 333 along the Lighthouse Route. It was home to the noted Canadian curator and historian Niels Jannasch (1924–2001).

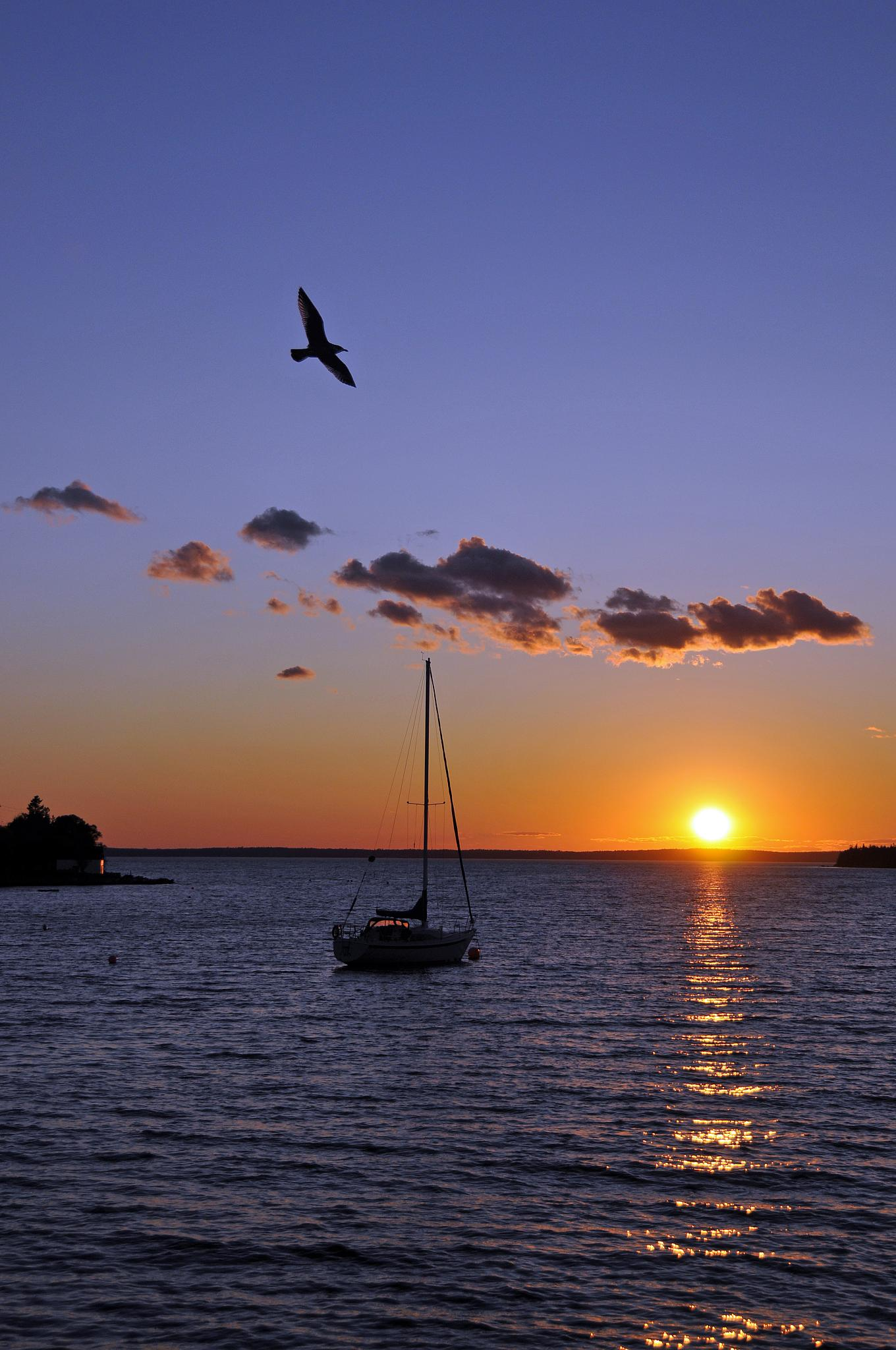
Sunset at Seabright, Nova Scotia
