= HMCS Quinte (J166) =

1941 Bangor-class minesweeper

History

Canada
- Name: Quinte
- Namesake: Bay of Quinte
- Builder: Burrard Dry Dock Co. Ltd., North Vancouver
- Laid down: 14 December 1940
- Launched: 8 March 1941
- Commissioned: 30 August 1941
- Decommissioned: 25 October 1946
- Identification: Pennant number: J166
- Honours and awards: Atlantic, 1941-42
- Fate: Sold 1947 for scrap

General characteristics
- Class & type: Bangor-class minesweeper
- Displacement: 672 long tons (683 t)
- Length: 180 ft (54.9 m) oa
- Beam: 28 ft 6 in (8.7 m)
- Draught: 9 ft 9 in (3.0 m)
- Propulsion: 2 Admiralty 3-drum water tube boilers, 2 shafts, vertical triple-expansion reciprocating engines, 2,400 ihp (1,790 kW)
- Speed: 16.5 knots (31 km/h)
- Complement: 83
- Armament: 1 × QF 4 in (102 mm)/40 cal Mk IV gun; 1 × QF 2-pounder Mark VIII; 2 × QF 20 mm Oerlikon guns; 40 depth charges as escort

HMCS Quinte (pennant J166) was a Bangor-class minesweeper constructed for the Royal Canadian Navy during the Second World War. The ship entered service in 1941 and took part in the Battle of the Atlantic. On 30 November 1942, Quinte ran aground and sank off Cape Breton Island. The ship was re-floated and repaired and spent the rest of the war as a training ship. Following the war, the minesweeper was used for naval research until decommissioned in 1946. The vessel was sold for scrap and broken up in 1947.

== Design and description ==
A British design, the Bangor-class minesweepers were smaller than the preceding Halcyon-class minesweepers in British service, but larger than the Fundy class in Canadian service. They came in two versions powered by different engines; those with a diesel engines and those with vertical triple-expansion steam engines. Quinte was of the latter design and was larger than her diesel-engined cousins. Quinte was 180 feet (54.9 m) long overall, had a beam of 28 feet 6 inches (8.7 m) and a draught of 9 feet 9 inches (3.0 m). The minesweeper had a displacement of 672 long tons (683 t). She had a complement of 6 officers and 77 enlisted.

Quinte had two vertical triple-expansion steam engines, each driving one shaft, using steam provided by two Admiralty three-drum boilers. The engines produced a total of 2,400 indicated horsepower (1,800 kW) and gave a maximum speed of 16.5 knots (30.6 km/h; 19.0 mph). The minesweeper could carry a maximum of 150 long tons (152 t) of fuel oil.

Quinte was armed with a single quick-firing (QF) 4-inch (102 mm)/40 caliber Mk IV gun mounted forward. (Note: The 40 caliber denotes the length of the gun. This means that the length of the gun barrel is 40 times the bore diameter.) For anti-aircraft purposes, the minesweeper was equipped with one QF 2-pounder Mark VIII and two single-mounted QF 20 mm Oerlikon guns. As a convoy escort, Quinte was deployed with 40 depth charges launched from two depth charge throwers and four chutes.

== Operational history ==
The minesweeper was ordered as part of the 1939–40 construction programme. The ship's keel was laid down on 14 December 1940 by Burrard Dry Dock Co, Ltd. at their yard in Vancouver. Named for a bay in Ontario, Quinte was launched on 8 March 1941 and commissioned into the Royal Canadian Navy on 30 August 1941.

Sent to the East Coast of Canada, Quinte arrived at Halifax, Nova Scotia on 14 November 1941. The minesweeper was assigned to the Western Local Escort Force as a convoy escort and remained with the unit until June 1942. That month, the ship transferred to Halifax Force, the local escort and patrol force operating out of Halifax. In October the ship underwent a six-week refit at Lunenburg, Nova Scotia. Following completion of the refit, Quinte ran aground and sank at the entrance to St. Peter's Canal, Cape Breton Island on 30 November 1942.

Quinte was re-floated and towed to Pictou, Nova Scotia on 25 April 1943 where she underwent repairs. After the repairs were completed in June 1944, the minesweeper was sent to Digby, Nova Scotia where she became a training ship at HMCS Cornwallis. From 21 August 1944 until December 1945 she remained in this duty. Following this, the ship was loaned to the Naval Research Establishment until 25 October 1946, when the minesweeper was paid off. Quinte was put up for sale on 4 August 1947 and sold to Dominion Steel Corporation to be broken up at Sydney, Nova Scotia.
