= CSTC HMCS Acadia =

Royal Canadian Sea Cadets training centre in Nova Scotia

HMCS Acadia Cadet Training Centre was a Royal Canadian Sea Cadets training centre in Cornwallis Park, Nova Scotia. The centre took its name from the ship HMCS Acadia, a hydrographic research ship which was commissioned into the navy in both World War I and World War II and based at the end of its naval career at the Cornwallis base as a training ship. In November 1945, HMCS Acadia was decommissioned from Royal Canadian Navy service and the vessel returned to civilian operations with the Canadian Hydrographic Service as CSS Acadia. The name and unit colours of HMCS Acadia were revived in 1956 by the RCN when a new Royal Canadian Sea Cadets summer training centre was established at the naval base HMCS Protector on Cape Breton Island. It was called HMCS Acadia.

In 1965, HMCS Acadia was decommissioned when HMCS Protector was closed that year; the Canadian Coast Guard College took over the former naval and sea cadet facilities. Royal Canadian Sea Cadets would continue to receive training from 1965–1970 at the naval training base HMCS Cornwallis near Digby, and in the 1970s at the shore-based facility HMCS Micmac at CFB Halifax.

On July 29, 1978, the unit name HMCS Acadia was recommissioned for the fourth time (second time as a cadet training centre) at CFB Cornwallis, the base which housed the Canadian Forces Recruit School. HMCS Acadia occupied a building that had been formerly used for naval communication training. HMCS Micmac was consolidated into HMCS Acadia at this time.

Despite the closure of CFB Cornwallis as an active military base in 1994, HMCS Acadia continued to operate as a tenant at Cornwallis Park. Each year Annapolis Basin Conference Centre, which is the current owner of the former CF base, hosted approximately 1,500 cadets and staff. HMCS Acadia celebrated its 50th anniversary in 2006 and constructed a time capsule for the 75th anniversary of the unit in 2031.

== Closure ==
On December 6, 2021, Cadets Canada announced plans for its 2022 cadet summer training year and HMCS Acadia was not included in the list of training centres that would facilitate cadets. Due to the reduction of the number of CTCs to 12, HMCS Acadia was not included, and will not host cadets again as a training centre.
