= Cornwallis Park =

Community in Nova Scotia, Canada

Coordinates: 44.650°N 65.633°W

Cornwallis in Nova Scotia

Cornwallis Park is a community in the Canadian province of Nova Scotia, located in Annapolis County. As of the 2021 census, the population was 488, an increase of 1.9% from 2016.

== History ==
The community is located on the western edge of Clementsport and immediately east of Deep Brook. It was formerly named Cornwallis after a military base was established as HMCS Cornwallis in 1942 and becoming CFB Cornwallis in 1968 (it was mothballed from 1946 to 1949). After CFB Cornwallis closed in 1994 the property was converted to civilian use. A local development authority used the name Cornwallis Park and this name was formally adopted for the community in 2000.

== Demographics ==
In the 2021 Census of Population conducted by Statistics Canada, Cornwallis Park had a population of 488 living in 238 of its 258 total private dwellings, a change of 1.9% from its 2016 population of 479. With a land area of 2.14 km^{2} (0.83 sq mi), it had a population density of 228.0/km^{2} (590.6/sq mi) in 2021.

== Current developments ==
Cornwallis Park was home to the Pearson Peacekeeping Centre's main administrative office, located in the former base commanders residence. A significant portion of the former military base's facilities (particularly housing, hospitality, meeting rooms and assembly halls) have been taken over by the Annapolis Basin Conference Centre. Cornwallis Park hosts over 1000 Royal Canadian Sea Cadets annually for training through CSTC HMCS Acadia. Many of the married quarters (PMQs) have been sold for private residences.
