= Niels Jannasch =

Niels Windekilde Jannasch OC
- Born: July 5, 1924; Holzminden, Germany
- Died: November 9, 2001 (aged 77); Seabright, Nova Scotia
- Occupations: Sailor, marine historian
- Known for: Founding director of the Maritime Museum of the Atlantic
- Spouse: Barbara Dierig

Niels Windekilde Jannasch OC (July 5, 1924 – November 9, 2001) was a German-Canadian mariner, marine historian and the founding director of the Maritime Museum of the Atlantic.

He was born on July 5, 1924, in Holzminden, Germany. Jannasch served with coastal forces in the German navy in the Second World War. After the war he sailed in merchant ships under Finnish and German flags, most notably the four-masted barque Passat during the last grain race. On this, her last commercial voyage, he served as ship's carpenter. When she was refitted as a training ship he re-joined as bosun. He married Barbara Dierig in 1952 and the couple emigrated to Halifax, Nova Scotia. Jannasch became the first director of the Maritime Museum of Canada in 1959 and oversaw its growth and many plans before it finally moved to a large waterfront location in 1981, and became the Maritime Museum of the Atlantic.

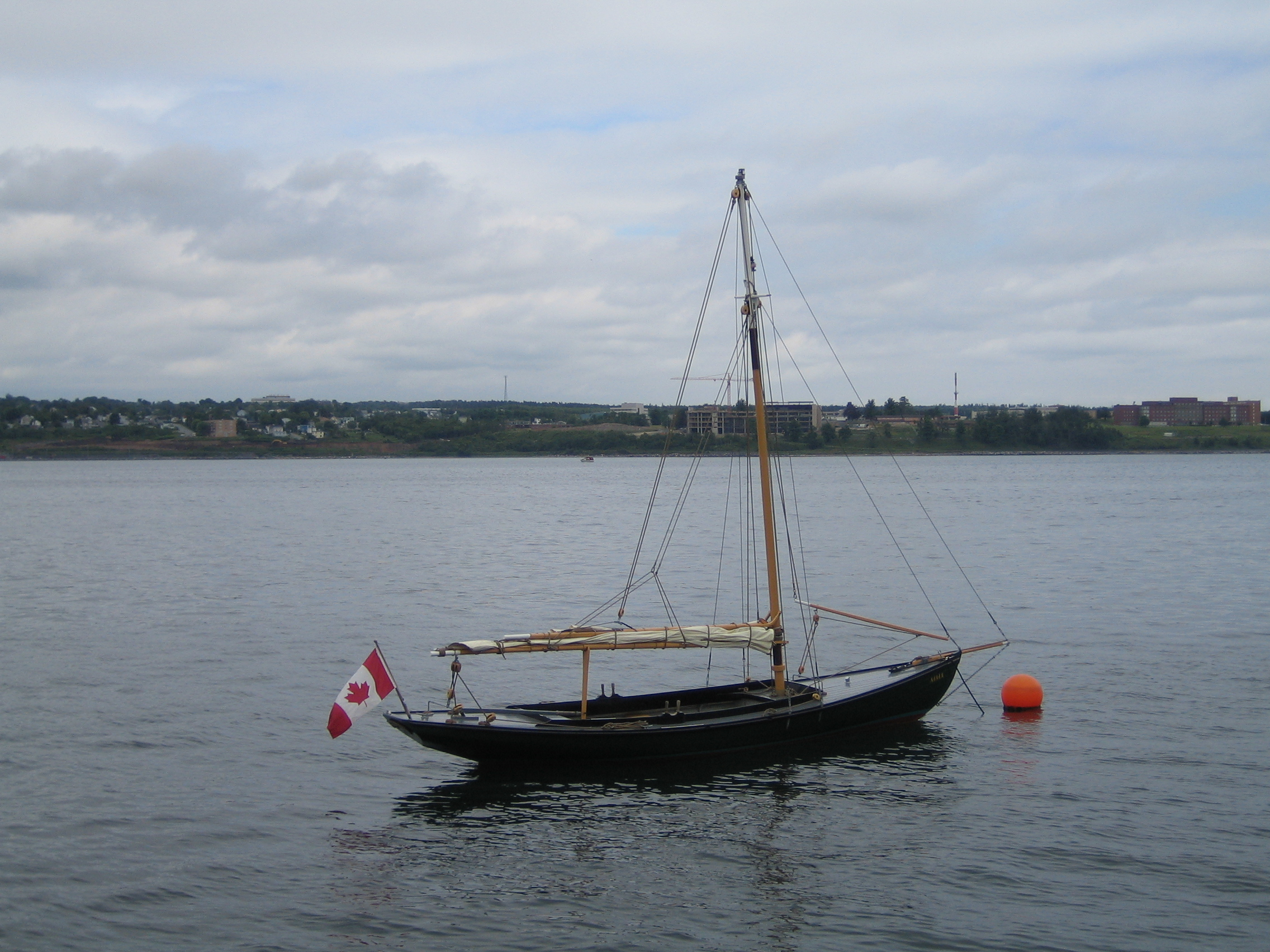
The sloop Windekilda, named in honour of Niels Windekilda Jannasch

He retired in 1985 but continued to go to sea and contribute to marine scholarship in many ways. He was a founder and charter member of the Canadian Nautical Research Society. His deep knowledge and tireless contribution to many heritage organizations and made him "an icon of the maritime history fraternity in Canada and aboard." He was invested into the Order of Canada in 1991 in recognition of his scholarly and public contributions.

Jannasch died at his home in Seabright, Nova Scotia on November 9, 2001. He is commemorated by a replica sailing sloop named Windekilde and the Niels Jannasch Library at the Maritime Museum of the Atlantic.
