= CSS Acadia =

Former Canadian research ship

Coordinates: 44°38′52.5″N 63°34′11.8″W

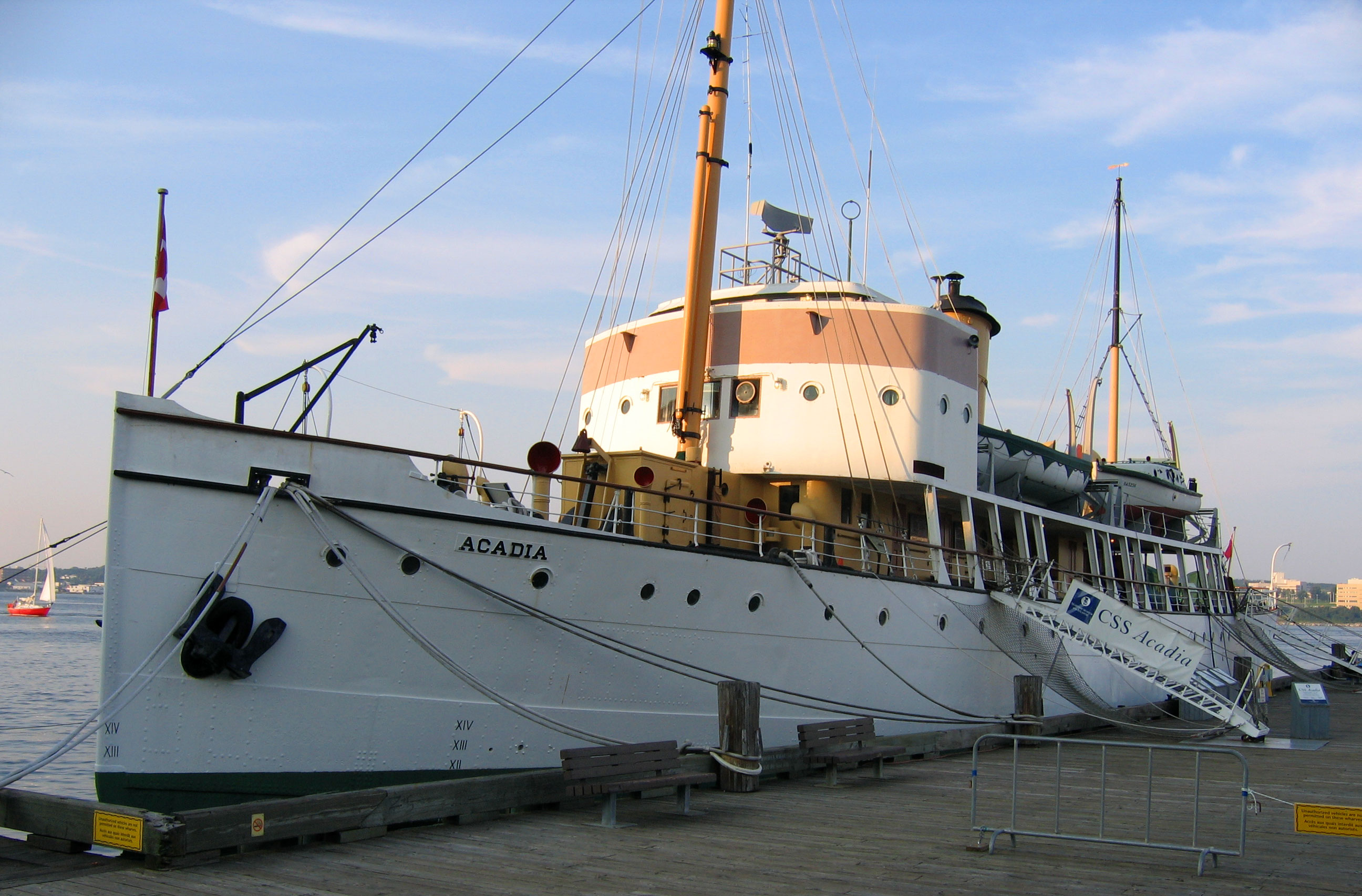
- CSS Acadia preserved as a museum ship alongside the wharves of the Maritime Museum of the Atlantic in Halifax, Nova Scotia in 2007

History

Canada
- Name: Acadia
- Namesake: Acadia
- Port of registry: Ottawa
- Builder: Swan, Hunter & Wigham Richardson, Newcastle
- Yard number: 912
- Laid down: 1912
- Launched: 8 May 1913
- In service: September 1913
- Out of service: November 1969
- Identification: UK official number 133535; code letters JCMD (until 1933); call sign CGFS (1930 onward); call sign CGCB (1960s onward)
- Status: Museum ship, Halifax, 1982

Canada
- Name: Acadia
- Commissioned: 16 January 1917
- Decommissioned: March 1919
- Recommissioned: 2 October 1939
- Decommissioned: 3 November 1945
- Identification: Pennant number: Z00

General characteristics
- Type: Hydrographic research ship/auxiliary patrol vessel
- Tonnage: 846 GRT, 439 NRT
- Displacement: 1,050 long tons (1,070 t)
- Length: 181 ft 9 in (55.40 m)
- Beam: 33.5 ft (10.2 m)
- Draught: 19 ft (5.8 m)
- Ice class: Ice strengthened
- Installed power: 1,715 shp (1,279 kW)
- Propulsion: Single shaft, 2 × Scotch boilers, 1 triple expansion steam engine,
- Speed: 14 knots (26 km/h; 16 mph)
- Complement: 60
- Armament: 1 × QF 4 in (102 mm); 1 × QF 12-pounder (76 mm) gun; 8 × depth charges

National Historic Site of Canada
- Official name: S.S. Acadia National Historic Site of Canada
- Designated: 1976

CSS Acadia is a former hydrographic and oceanographic research ship of the Hydrographic Survey of Canada and its successor, the Canadian Hydrographic Service. Acadia for 56 years from 1913 to 1969, charting the coastline of almost every part of Eastern Canada including pioneering surveys of Hudson Bay. She was also twice commissioned into the Royal Canadian Navy (RCN) as HMCS Acadia, the only ship still afloat to have served the RCN in both World Wars. The ship is also the last remaining ship afloat that was present at the 1917 Halifax Explosion. The ship is now a museum ship, designated as a National Historic Site of Canada, moored in Halifax Harbour at the Maritime Museum of the Atlantic.

== Design and description ==
Acadia is a research ship that initially measured 170 feet 9 inches (52.04 m) long with a beam of 33 ft 7 in (10.24 m) and a draught of 19 ft (5.8 m). The ship was measured at 846 gross register tons (GRT) and 439 net register tons (NRT). The ship had a displacement of 1,050 long tons (1,070 t). The ship was powered by steam provided by two coal-fired Scotch boilers being fed to a triple expansion engine turning one screw, creating 1,715 shaft horsepower (1,279 kW). (Note: Maginley & Collin give the ship 1,700 hp (1,300 kW).) This gave the ship a maximum speed of 14 knots (26 km/h; 16 mph). The ship was designed to operate along Canada's northern coast, and had additional 7/8-inch (22 mm) steel plating and strengthened framing. After arriving in Canada, the ship underwent further strengthening for use in ice. The ship had one funnel and two masts and the crew cabins had mahogany and oak paneling and brasswork. The vessel originally had wooden carvings of the coat of arms of the provinces of Ontario and Nova Scotia situated on the starboard side of the bow and those of Quebec and New Brunswick on the port side. The crew numbered 60 with 10 assigned to hydrography-related research, but that number fluctuated depending on the planned deployment. The vessel was equipped with two survey launches and cutters.

In Royal Canadian Navy (RCN) service, the vessel was armed with a 4-inch (102 mm) gun placed forward and a 12-pounder gun situated aft. The ship had a displacement of 1,050 long tons (1,067 t) and measured 169 feet 11 inches (51.8 m) long with a beam of 33 feet 6 inches (10.2 m) and a draught of 19 feet 0 inches (5.8 m). In naval service, the vessel could only reach speeds of 8 knots (15 km/h; 9.2 mph). The ship had a complement of 59 officers and ratings in RCN service.

Acadia was the first ship of the Canadian Hydrographic Service to be fitted with wireless telegraphy in 1913. The ship had a gyrocompass installed in 1928. The following year in 1929, Acadia had an echo sounder system fitted. In 1951, the vessel underwent a complete decking renewal, a partial renewal in 1985. The masts, originally fitted for sails, were converted for lighting and sensor use and the launches/cutters were modernised. In 1955, the ship underwent a refit that added an enlarged bridge. In 1956, the ship had her first navigational radar installed. By 1987, the vessel measured 182 feet 1 inch (55.5 m) long overall with a beam of 32 feet 10 inches (10 m) and a depth of 9 feet 10 inches (3 m). The ship's displacement had increased to 1,700 long tons (1,700 t). By the 1960s, the ship could only make approximately 9 knots (17 km/h; 10 mph).

== Construction and career ==
Acadia was designed in Ottawa by Canadian naval architect R. L. Newman for the Hydrographic Survey of Canada and built by Swan Hunter & Wigham Richardson at Newcastle-on-Tyne in England. Named after Acadia, the early colonial name for Atlantic Canada, she was launched on 8 May 1913. Acadia arrived at Halifax, Nova Scotia on 8 July and was entered service that July upon her first voyage using the prefix CGS, which stood for "Canadian Government Ship." Her first two seasons were spent charting in western Hudson Bay at Port Nelson, and rescued the crew of the steamship Alette, crushed by ice in Hudson Bay, the first of several rescue operations Acadia would perform. In her first year, she also made the first Canadian surveys of Sable Island in November 1913. She saw extensive use prior to 1917 surveying the waters along Canada's Atlantic coast, including tidal charting and depth soundings for various ports, also performing pioneering Canadian oceanographic research in 1915 and 1916.

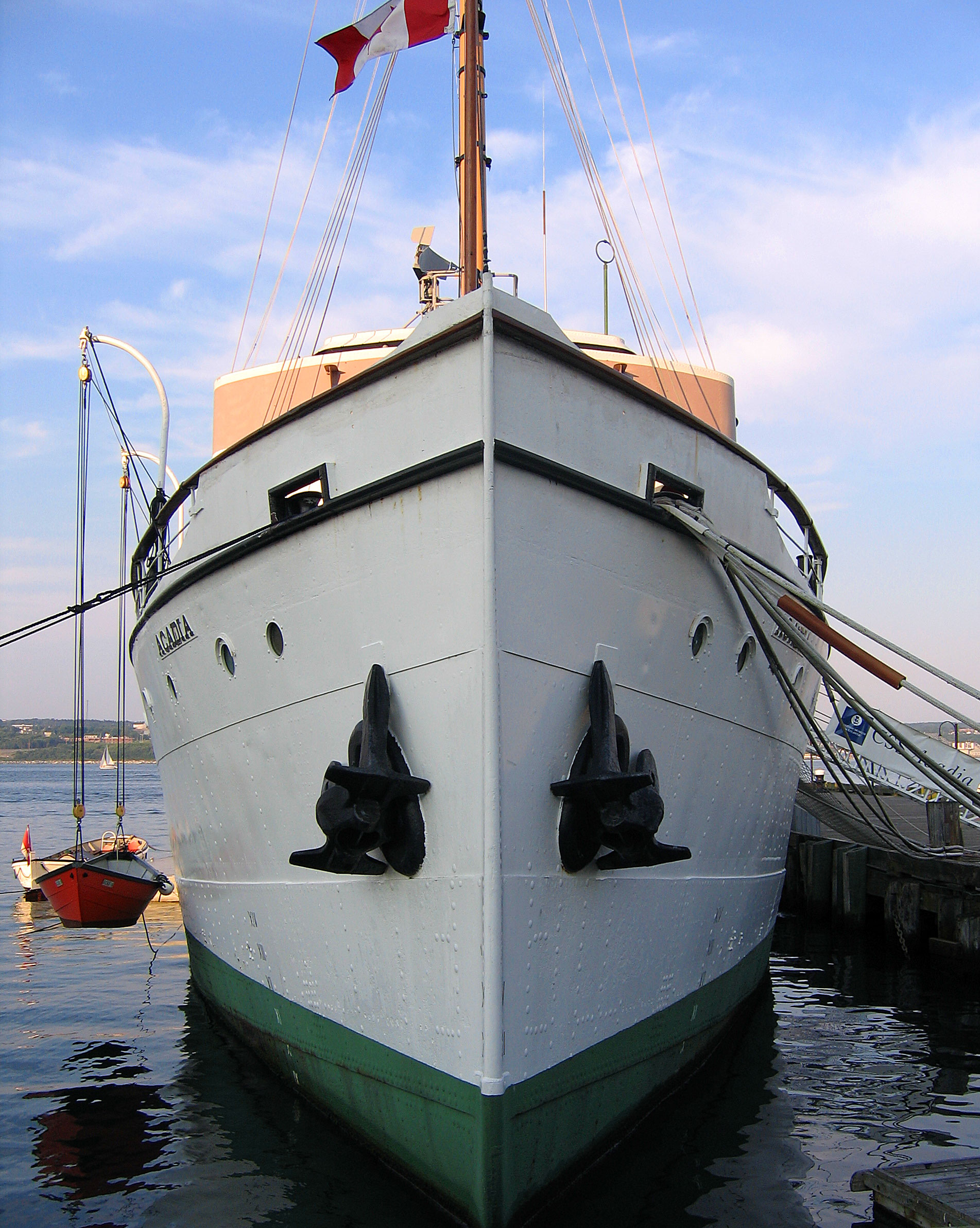
Bow of Acadia with a dory lowered on her starboard davits

=== World War I ===
After the outbreak of World War I in 1914, Acadia was among the government vessels used to patrol the Bay of Fundy during the winter months, sailing between Yarmouth, Nova Scotia and Grand Manan. Acadia was commissioned into the RCN on 16 January 1917, as a patrol vessel, replacing the CGS prefix with His Majesty's Canadian Ship (HMCS), thus becoming HMCS Acadia. Though intended for patrol, the vessel's slow speed made her practically unusable. The vessel was armed with one 4-inch (102 mm) gun placed forward. From 1917 until the end of the war, she conducted anti-submarine patrols from the Bay of Fundy along Nova Scotia's Atlantic coast and through the Gulf of Saint Lawrence. On 6 December 1917, less than twelve months into her wartime service, Acadia survived the Halifax Explosion. Acadia was serving as a guard ship at the entrance to Bedford Basin but suffered only minor damage. In 1918, she was one of the Canadian warships assigned to escort merchant convoys through Canadian waters, defending them against the German submarine threat. Near the end of the war, she served as a platform for experiments with anti-submarine kite balloons. The ship was decommissioned from RCN service in March 1919.

=== Inter-war period ===
Following her naval service, Acadia was returned to the Hydrographic Survey of Canada (renamed the Canadian Hydrographic Service in 1928) and resumed hydrographic survey work throughout the inter-war period of the 1920s and 1930s. Though in the winter months of 1922–1923, the ship was detailed with icebreaking duties along the coast of Nova Scotia and in major coastal ports on the way. Lack of survey funds suspended her operation in 1924 and 1925. In 1926 she resumed surveys, mainly in the Gulf of St. Lawrence and up into the Saguenay River. A major achievement was surveying in the summer seasons in 1929 to 1931, to establish the port of Churchill, Manitoba. In 1929 Acadia rescued the crew of a crashed Sikorsky amphibious aircraft named "Untin Bowler" who were attempting a round-trip to Europe across Greenland and Iceland sponsored by the Chicago Tribune until the aircraft was destroyed by ice off the tip of Labrador. In mid-to-late September 1939, the vessel was tasked with re-charting the coasts of the Canadians Maritimes and the island of Newfoundland. In 1934, Acadia was among the ships gathered to celebrate the 400th anniversary of French explorer Jacques Cartier's arrival in the North America with a celebration at Gaspé, Quebec. She returned to icebreaking duties along the Nova Scotian coast in the winter months of 1934–1935.

=== World War II ===
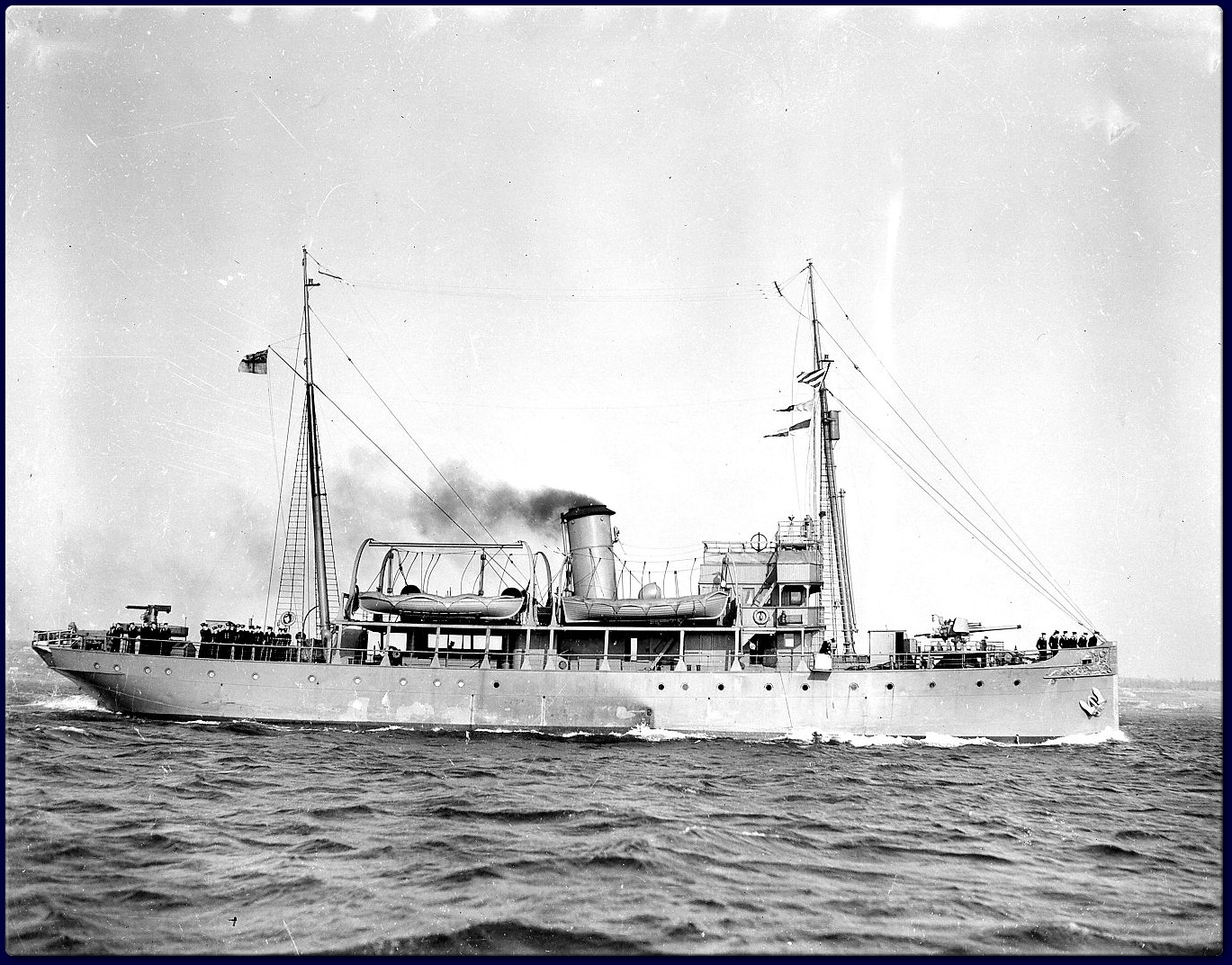
In her armed wartime guise as HMCS Acadia

HMCS Acadia's badge, designed during her World War II service

The vessel was recommissioned into the Royal Canadian Navy on 2 October 1939 during World War II, once again becoming HMCS Acadia and given the pennant number Z00 on the Atlantic coast. (Note: The patrol vessel HMCS Malaspina used the same pennant number on the Pacific coast.) She was first used as a training ship for HMCS Stadacona, a shore establishment at Halifax. From May 1940 to March 1941 she saw active use as a patrol ship off the entrance of Halifax Harbour, providing close escort support for small convoys entering and leaving the port from the harbour limits at the submarine nets off McNabs Island to the "Halifax Ocean Meeting Point". After a refit, Acadia was assigned in mid-1941 for use as an anti-aircraft training ship and serving as a gunnery training vessel for crews of the Defensively Equipped Merchant Ships (DEMS) fleet. In June 1944, Acadia was assigned to the training base HMCS Cornwallis and stationed at the nearby port of Digby, Nova Scotia where she was used for gunnery training. The ship was decommissioned on 3 November 1945. The name HMCS Acadia continued in use as a Royal Canadian Sea Cadets training centre at Cornwallis, Nova Scotia beginning in 1956 until its closure in 2022.

==== Badge ====
During World War II, Acadia was given an unofficial badge honouring the ship. However, in 1948, an official badge and official colours were awarded by the RCN. Acadia's badge consists of a young woman's head and shoulders wearing a 1755-period cap and a scarf all done in white situated on a field of blue with a golden semé-de-lis. The ship's official colours are gold and blue. (Note: The official blazon is "Azure, a seme-de-lis or, the head and shoulders of a young women wearing a cap and scarf of the period (1755) all in colour of a cameo stone".)

=== Later years ===
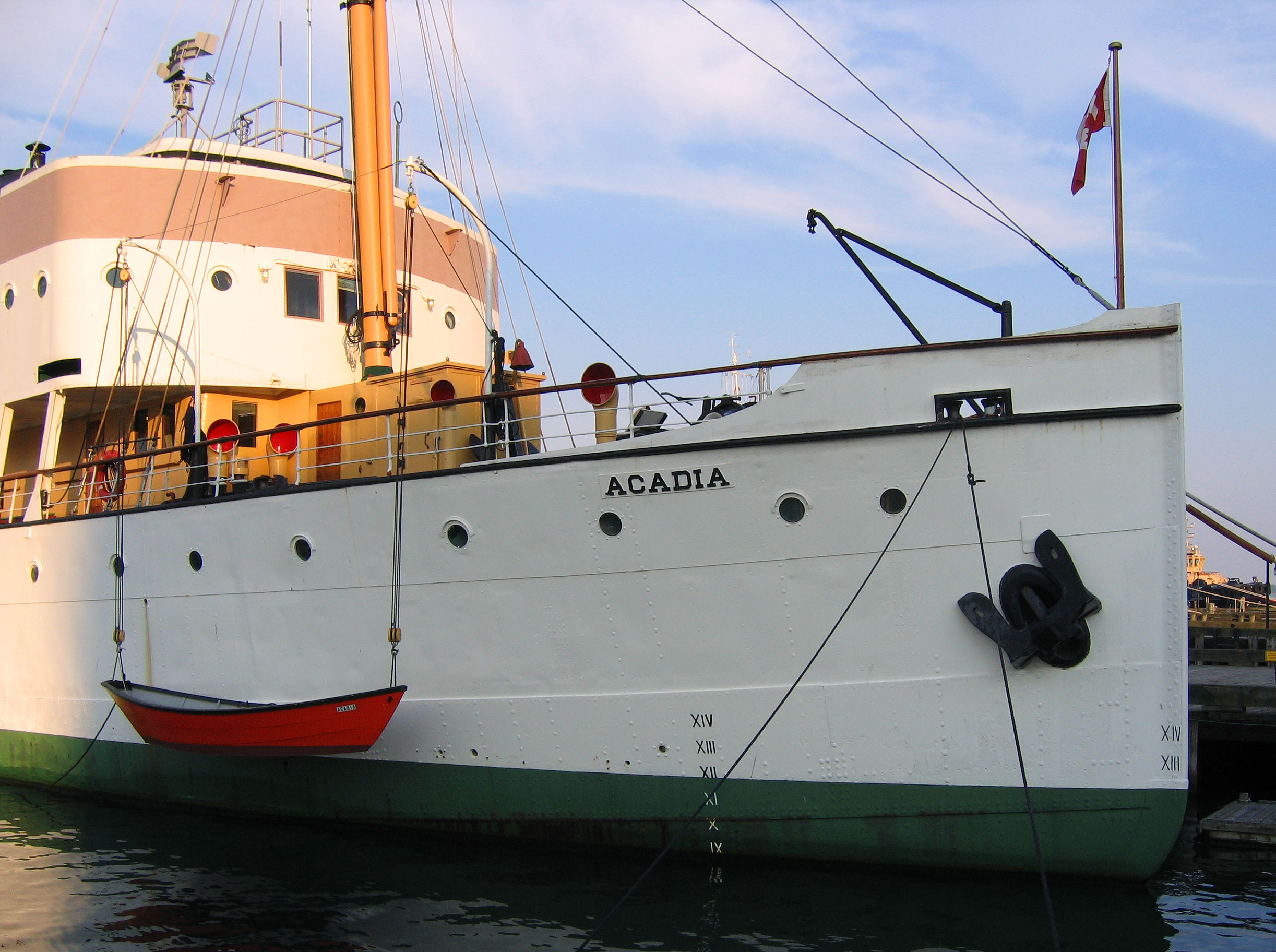
Starboard bow of Acadia, with a dory lowered on davits

With the end of the war Acadia was returned for the second time to the Canadian Hydrographic Service with the new prefix CSS, the acronym standing for Canadian Survey Ship. In 1946, the vessel was tasked with charting the Northumberland Strait. A major post-war assignment was updating and expanding the nautical charts of Newfoundland and Labrador after the former colony had joined Canada in 1949. In the 1950s, the wooden carvings of the provincial coat-of-arms were removed during a refit and were lost in a fire when the shed they were stored in burned. In 1961, Acadia rescued hundreds of people from forest fires in eastern Newfoundland, evacuating 600 people. The ship was taken out of service with the Canadian Hydrographic Service on 28 November 1969.

=== Museum ship ===
After being retired, Acadia was transferred to the Bedford Institute of Oceanography (BIO) for use as a museum ship. The vessel was declared a National Historic Site in 1976. On 9 February 1980, the BIO transferred Acadia to the Maritime Museum of the Atlantic for preservation and interpretation. In 1982, the vessel was moved to her new home alongside the wharves behind the museum. Acadia is known for being one of the few ships to continue the tradition of keeping an official ship's cat, of which there have been four since 1982.

Acadia is moored at the museum's North Wharf and opens to visitors from May to October. Acadia is dry docked every five years to preserve her hull using zinc anodes. In 2017–2018, the poor condition of Acadia made Canadian national news, with demands for government intervention to stop the ship's deterioration. In 2021, the vessel was sent for an overhaul at Shelburne, Nova Scotia. Acadia is the only known vessel still afloat to have survived the Halifax Explosion in 1917 and serve in the Royal Canadian Navy in both world wars.

==== Erik the Red ====
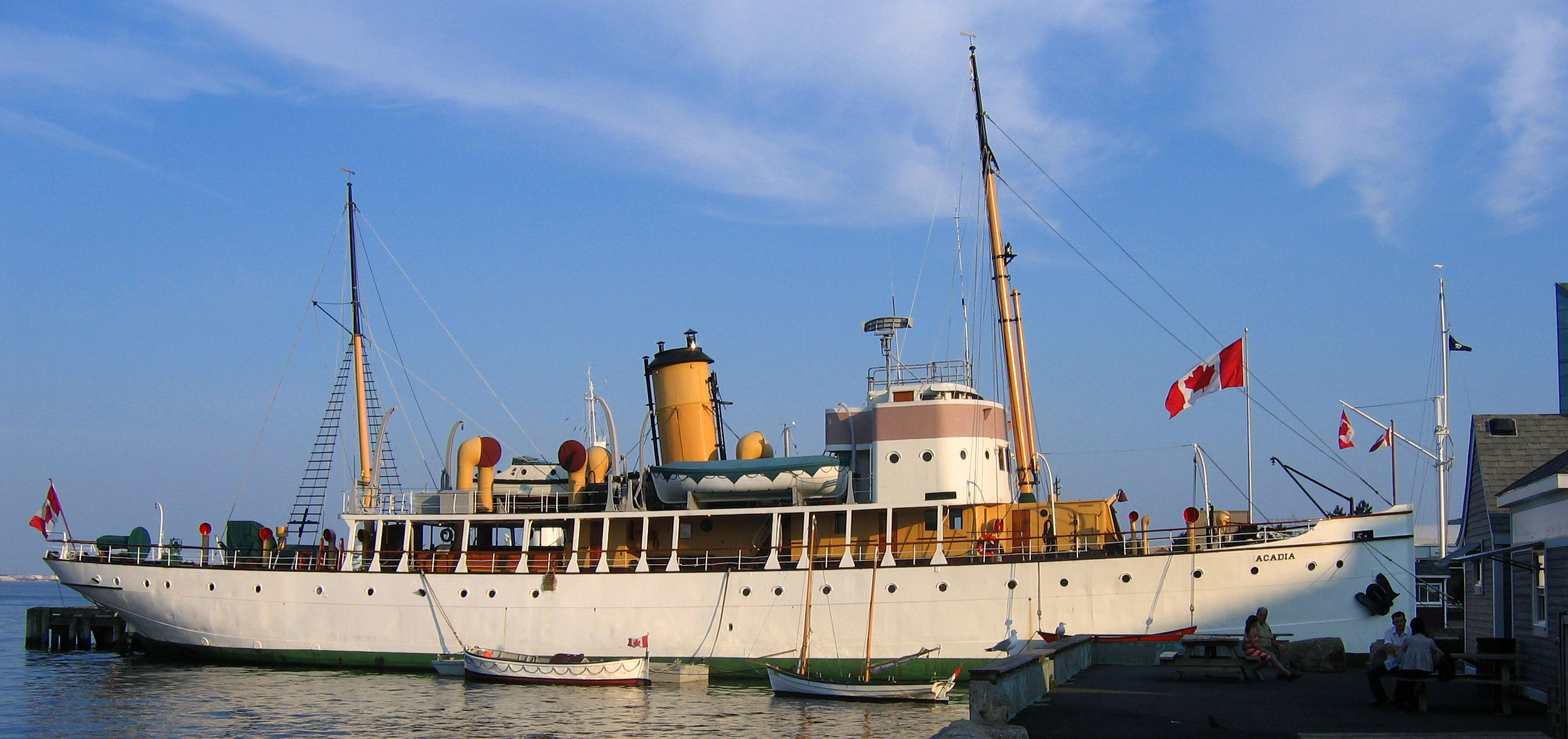
Starboard view of Acadia

Named after the famous Viking, Erik the Red was a tabby cat, born about 1997, that served on Acadia as the rodent control officer. He is believed to have been a stray that found his way aboard the ship as a stowaway on Canada Day in 2000. He initially worked alongside the existing rodent control officer, Clara, until Clara's retirement and quick decline in health. Erik the Red survived three abductions or disappearances, which were particularly worrisome for the community because Erik had medical concerns requiring daily medication or he would not eat. Erik became a well known local attraction on the boardwalk near Acadia, welcomed up and down the waterfront and into stores. Erik retired in 2015 during a party in his honour on 20 September and died in July 2017 after a short illness.

== See also ==
- List of museum ships
- Ships preserved in museums

== Sources ==
- Arbuckle, J. Graeme (1987). Badges of the Canadian Navy. Halifax, Nova Scotia: Nimbus Publishing. ISBN 0-920852-49-1.
- Armstrong, John Griffith (2002). The Halifax Explosion and the Royal Canadian Navy. Vancouver, British Columbia: UBC Press. ISBN 0-7748-0891-8.
- Barr, P. (July 1987). "CSS 'Acadia' 75 Years of Service". International Hydrographic Review. LXIV (2). Monaco: 15–21.
- Hadley, Michael L.; Sarty, Roger (1991). Tin-pots and Pirate Ships: Canadian Naval Forces and German Sea Raiders 1880–1918. Montreal & Kingston: McGill-Queen's University Press. ISBN 0-7735-0778-7.
- Johnston, William; Rawling, William G. P.; Gimblett, Richard H.; MacFarlane, John (2010). The Seabound Coast: The Official History of the Royal Canadian Navy, 1867–1939 (PDF). Vol. 1. Toronto: Dundurn Press. ISBN 978-1-55488-908-2.
- Macpherson, Ken; Barrie, Ron (2002). The Ships of Canada's Naval Forces 1910–2002 (Third ed.). St. Catharines, Ontario: Vanwell Publishing. ISBN 1-55125-072-1.
- Maginley, Charles D.; Collin, Bernard (2001). The Ships of Canada's Marine Services. St. Catharines, Ontario: Vanwell Publishing Limited. ISBN 1-55125-070-5.
- Meehan, O. M. (January 2004). "Chapter II: The Hydrographic Survey of Canada from its Formation to the First World War 1904-1914". The Northern Mariner. 14 (1): 43–103. doi:10.25071/2561-5467.521. ISSN 2561-5467.
- Meehan, O. M. (January 2004). "Chapter III: The Hydrographic Survey of Canada from the First World War to the Commencement of the Canadian Hydrographic Service, 1915-1927". The Northern Mariner. 14 (1): 105–158. doi:10.25071/2561-5467.522. ISSN 2561-5467.
- Meehan, O. M. (April 2004). "Chapter IV: The Hydrographic Survey of Canada from 1928 to the Commencement of the Second World War". The Northern Mariner. 14 (2): 159–244. doi:10.25071/2561-5467.523. ISSN 2561-5467.
- Mercantile Navy List. London: Registrar General of Shipping and Seamen. 1914. p. 3 – via Memorial University of Newfoundland.
- Mercantile Navy List. London: Registrar General of Shipping and Seamen. 1930. p. 3 – via Memorial University of Newfoundland.
- "HMCS Acadia". Government of Canada. 18 October 2022.
