= Maritime Museum of the Atlantic =

Coordinates: 44°38′51.7″N 63°34′15.8″W

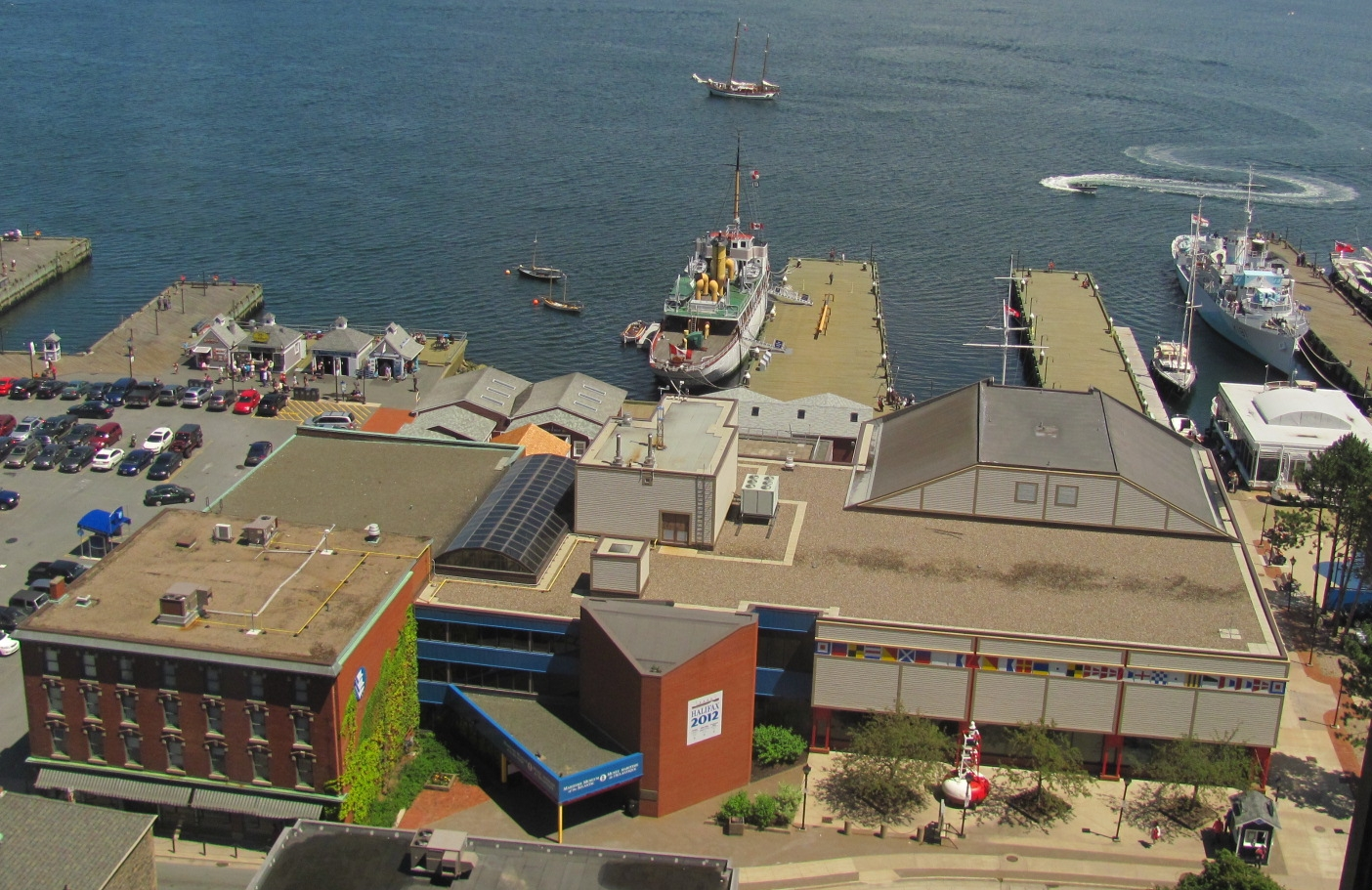
- Maritime Museum of the Atlantic
- Established: 1948
- Location: 1675 Lower Water Street; Halifax, Nova Scotia, Canada
- Type: Maritime Museum
- Director: Calum Ewing
- Curator: Roger Marsters
- Website: maritimemuseum.novascotia.ca

The Maritime Museum of the Atlantic is a maritime museum located in downtown Halifax, Nova Scotia, Canada.

The museum is a member institution of the Nova Scotia Museum and is the oldest and largest maritime museum in Canada with a collection of over 30,000 artifacts including 70 small craft and a steamship: the CSS Acadia, a 180-foot steam-powered hydrographic survey ship launched in 1913.

== History ==
The museum was founded in 1948. It was first known as the Maritime Museum of Canada and located at HMC Dockyard, the naval base on Halifax Harbour. Several naval officers served as volunteer chairs of the museum until 1959 when Niels Jannasch was hired as the museum's founding director, serving until 1985. The museum moved through several locations over the next three decades before its current building was constructed in 1981 as part of a waterfront redevelopment program. The museum received the CSS Acadia in 1982. Today the museum is part of the Nova Scotia Museum system.

== Location ==
The museum was one of the first attractions to open on the redeveloped Halifax Waterfront. Its location provides the museum with several piers and boatsheds, as well as a strategic view of the Halifax Harbour, which looks seaward towards the Harbourmaster office and Georges Island and across to Dartmouth. Among its facilities is the restored 1880s Robertson Store ship chandler building, as well as modern exhibit galleries in the Devonian Wing (the modern museum building). HMCS Sackville, a World War II Flower-class corvette is docked adjacent to the museum in the summer months but is not owned or administered by the museum. Also, the flags across the front of the building read, "Welcome aboard L44 38N G63 34W"--giving it's Latitude and lonGitude in degrees and minutes.

== Collection ==
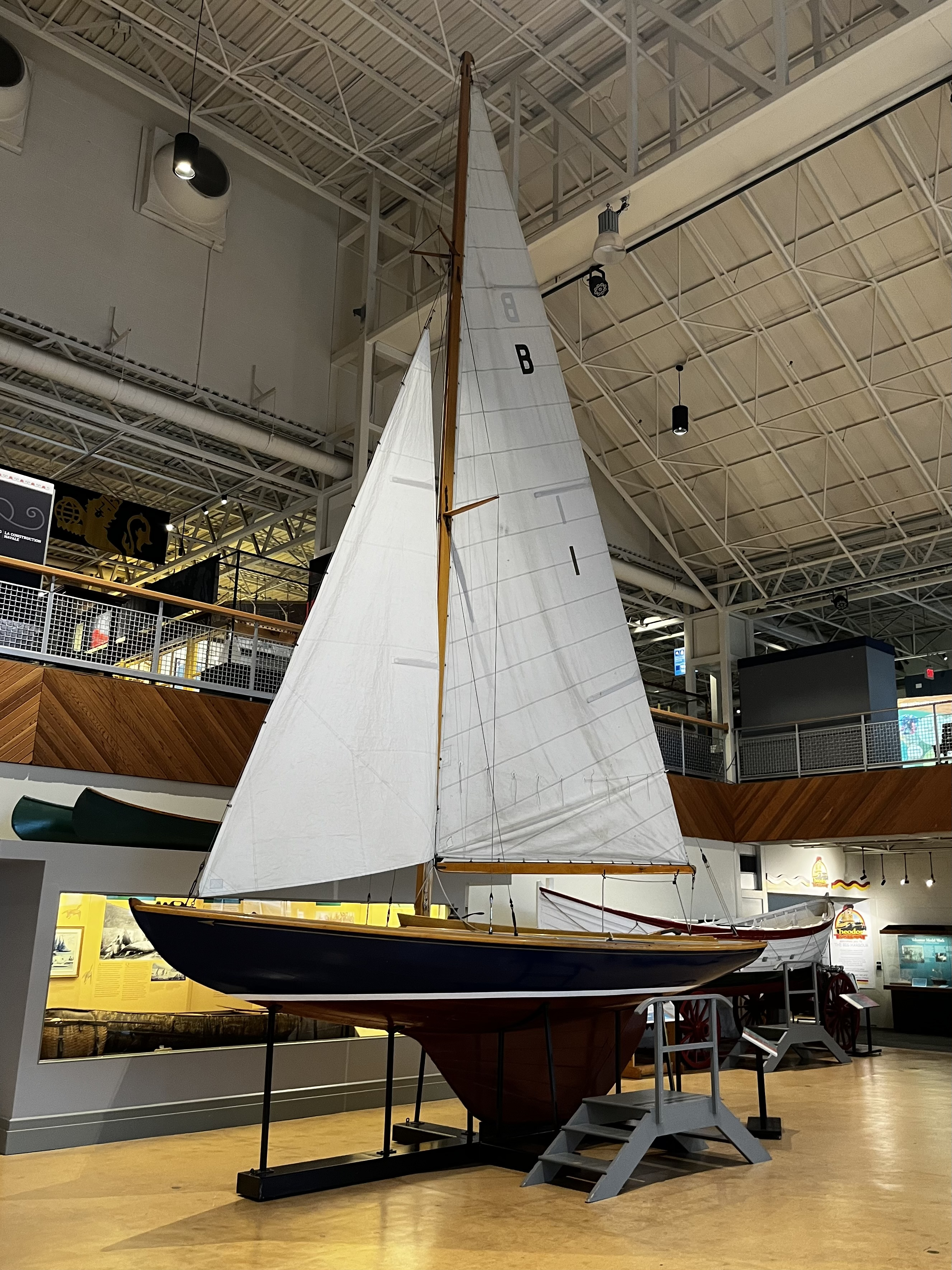
Bluenose one-design sloop #1, Maritime Museum of the Atlantic, Nova Scotia, Canada

In addition to the over 30,000 artifacts, the museum also has a collection of 30,000 photographs as well as a large collection of charts and rare books. A reference library, open to the public, is named after the museum's founding director, The Niels Jannasch Library. The museum has Canada's largest collection of ship portraits including the oldest ship portrait in Canada as well as a large collection of ship models including the original production models of the television show Theodore Tugboat. Ongoing restoration of Whim, a 1937 C-class sloop can be found in one of the boatsheds on the wharf behind the museum. In addition to this current restoration project, the boatsheds house some of the museum's small craft collection. During the summer months three boats in the working small craft collection can be found moored next to the CSS Acadia. In July 2017 the museum also completed restoration of the small schooner Hebridee II.

== Exhibits ==
Public galleries include the Days of Sail, the Age of Steam, Small Craft, the Canadian Navy, the Halifax Explosion, and Shipwrecks. A special permanent exhibit explores the sinking of the RMS Titanic with an emphasis on Nova Scotia's connection to recovering the bodies of Titanic victims. The museum has the world's foremost collection of wooden artifacts from Titanic, including one of the few surviving deck chairs. The Titanic exhibit also includes a child's pair of shoes, which helped identify Titanic's "unknown child" as Sidney Leslie Goodwin.

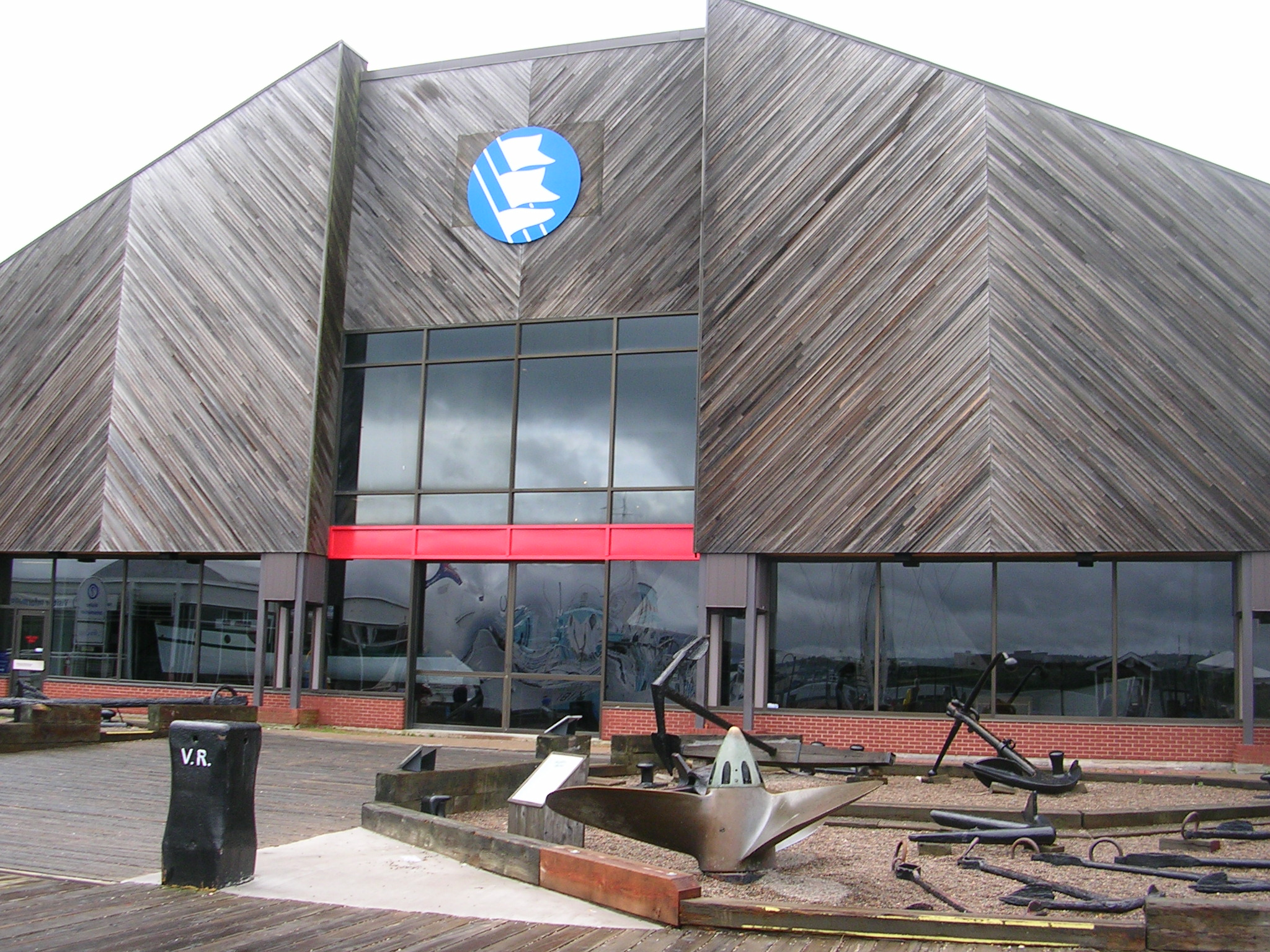
The waterfront side to the museum

The adjacent exhibit "Shipwreck Treasures of Nova Scotia" explores the many other shipwrecks off the coast of Nova Scotia including archaeological discoveries on naval shipwrecks in Louisbourg Harbour and an unknown 1750s schooner at Lower Prospect, Nova Scotia. The results of treasure hunting are also featured in a section on Cape Breton treasure wrecks which has displays of weapons, instruments, gold and silver from wrecks such as the 1711 HMS Feversham, the 1725 wreck of Chameau and the 1761 wreck of the ship Auguste.

The Age of Steam gallery includes a special display on Samuel Cunard, the Nova Scotian who founded Cunard. The restored 1880s Robertson building includes the fully restored Robertson ship chandlerly which features hands on foghorns, ropes and ship fittings.

The Navy gallery includes the "Convoy Exhibit" about the Battle of the Atlantic which includes the Canadian Merchant Navy Book of Remembrance. Monuments to the Canadian and Norwegian Merchant Navy are located just outside the museum along with a unique children's playground in the shape of a submarine.

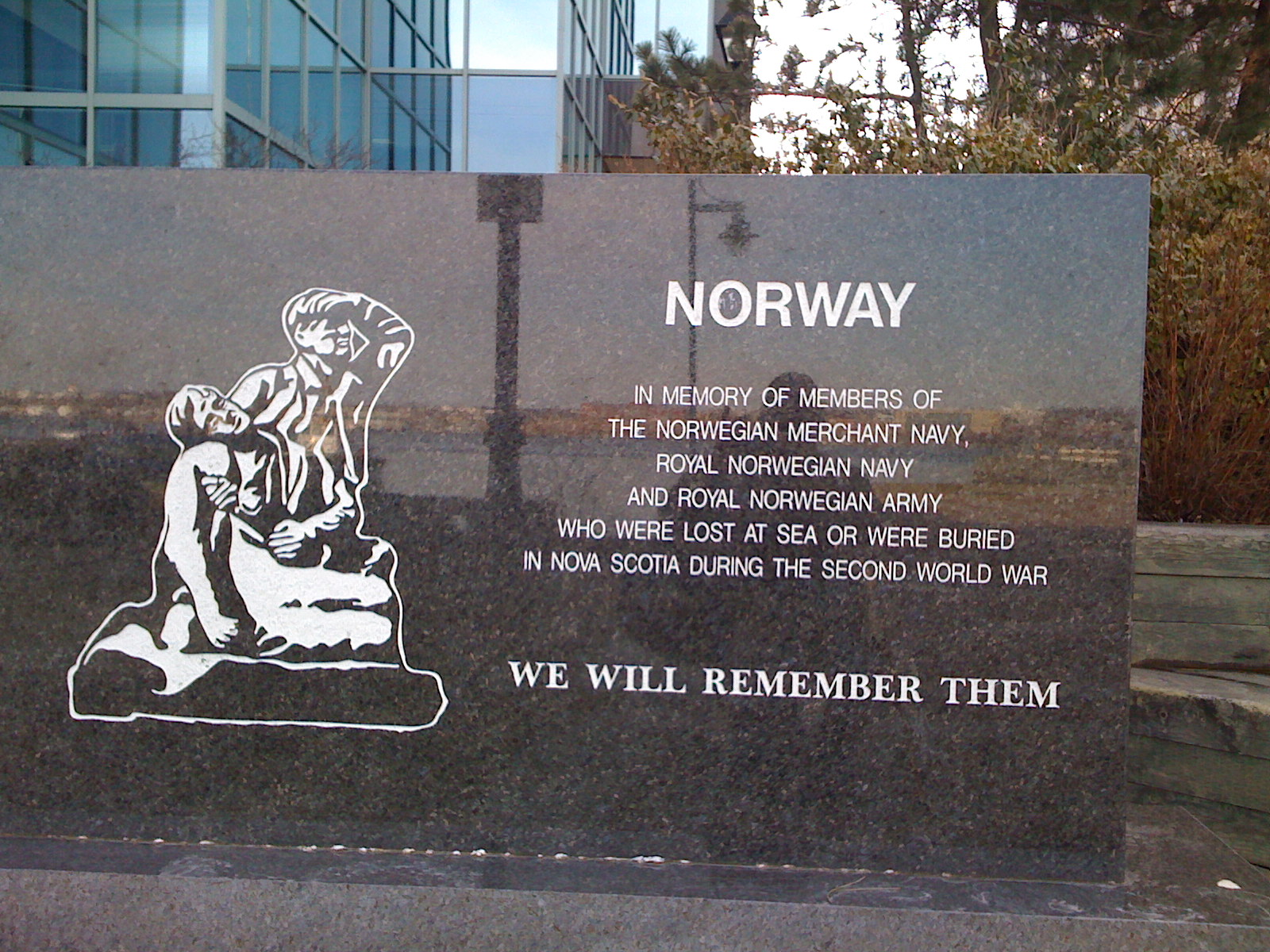
Norwegian Memorial beside the museum

The museum also has a changing exhibits gallery. A 2009 exhibit Ship of Fate: The Tragic Voyage of the St. Louis was the first Canadian exhibit to explore the 1939 voyage of the Jewish refugee ship MS St. Louis. The museum became the first museum in North America to present an exhibit about the lives of gay seafarers in 2011 when it presented Hello Sailor: Gay Life on the Ocean Waves, adapted from an exhibit developed at the Merseyside Maritime Museum in Liverpool, England. The 2012 exhibit explores the experiences of the cable ships based in Halifax who recovered most of the victims of the RMS Titanic sinking.

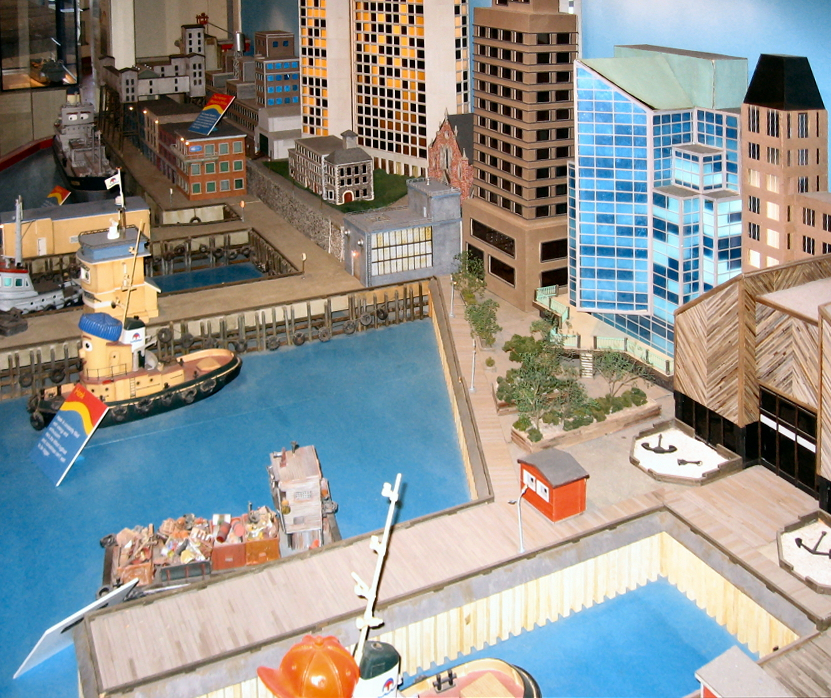
The original models and set from Theodore Tugboat

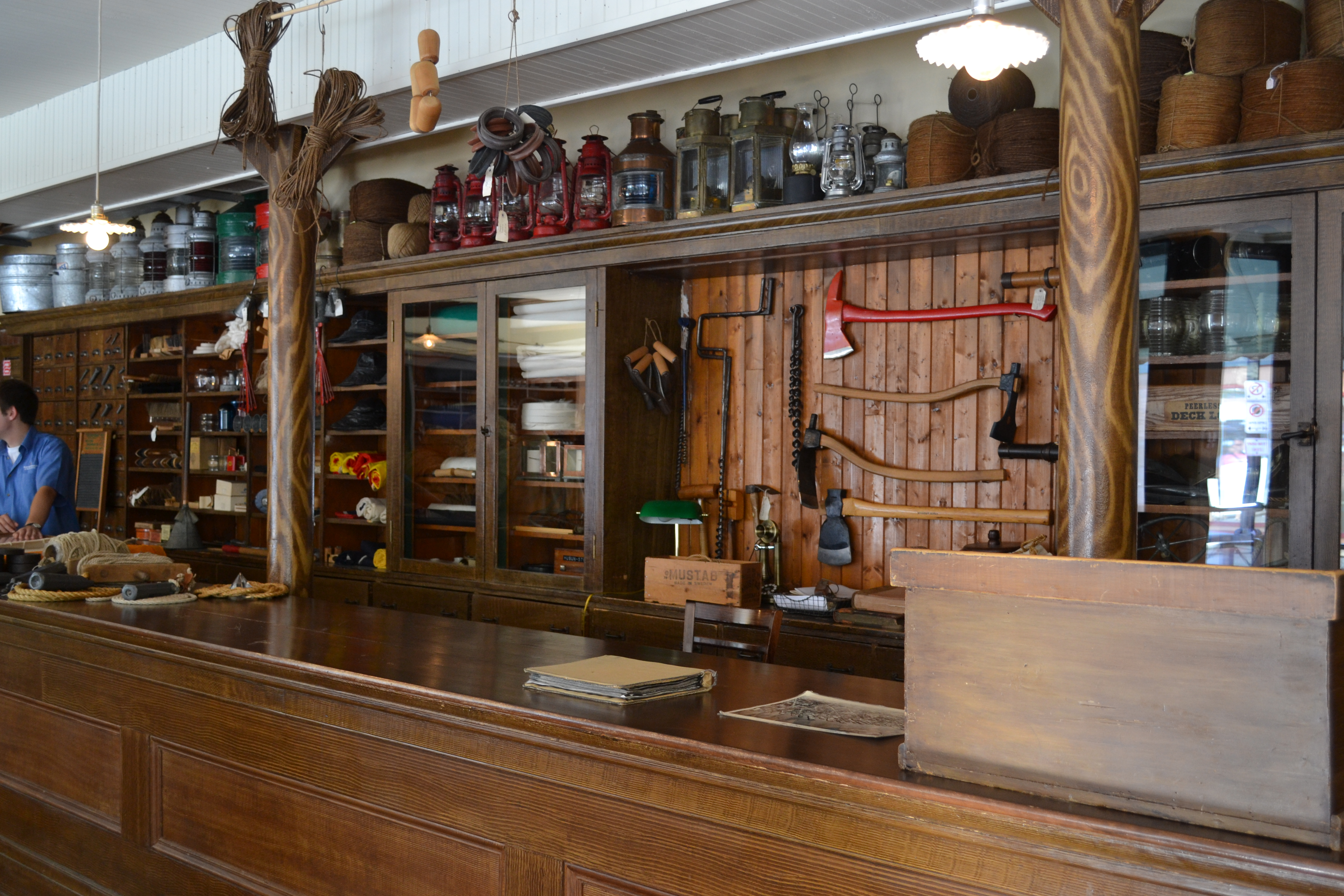
Artifacts in the restored ship chandlery

Sailboat exhibit

One of several ship models on display

== Vessels ==
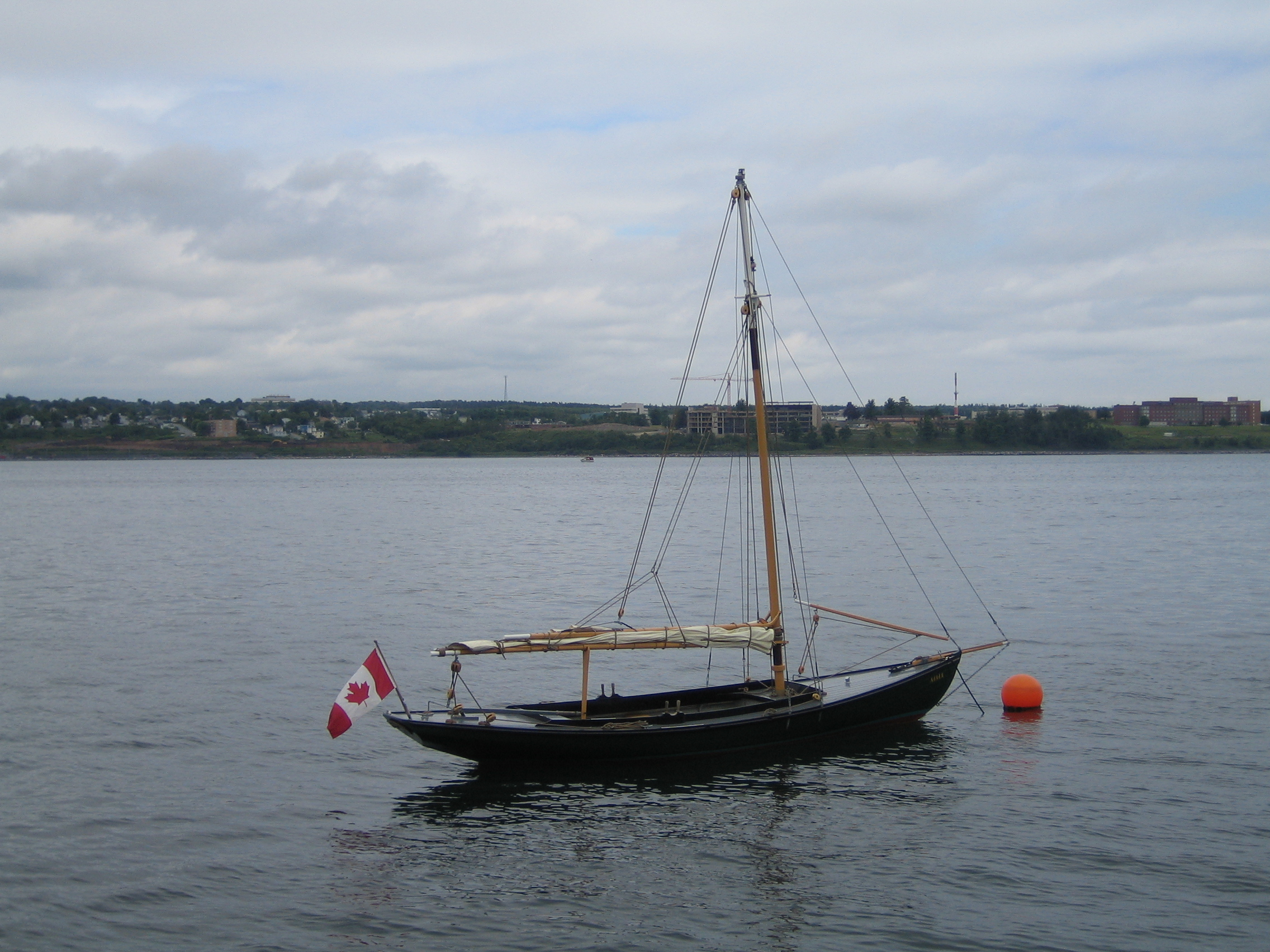
The sloop Windekilda, named after founding director Niels Windekilda Jannasch.

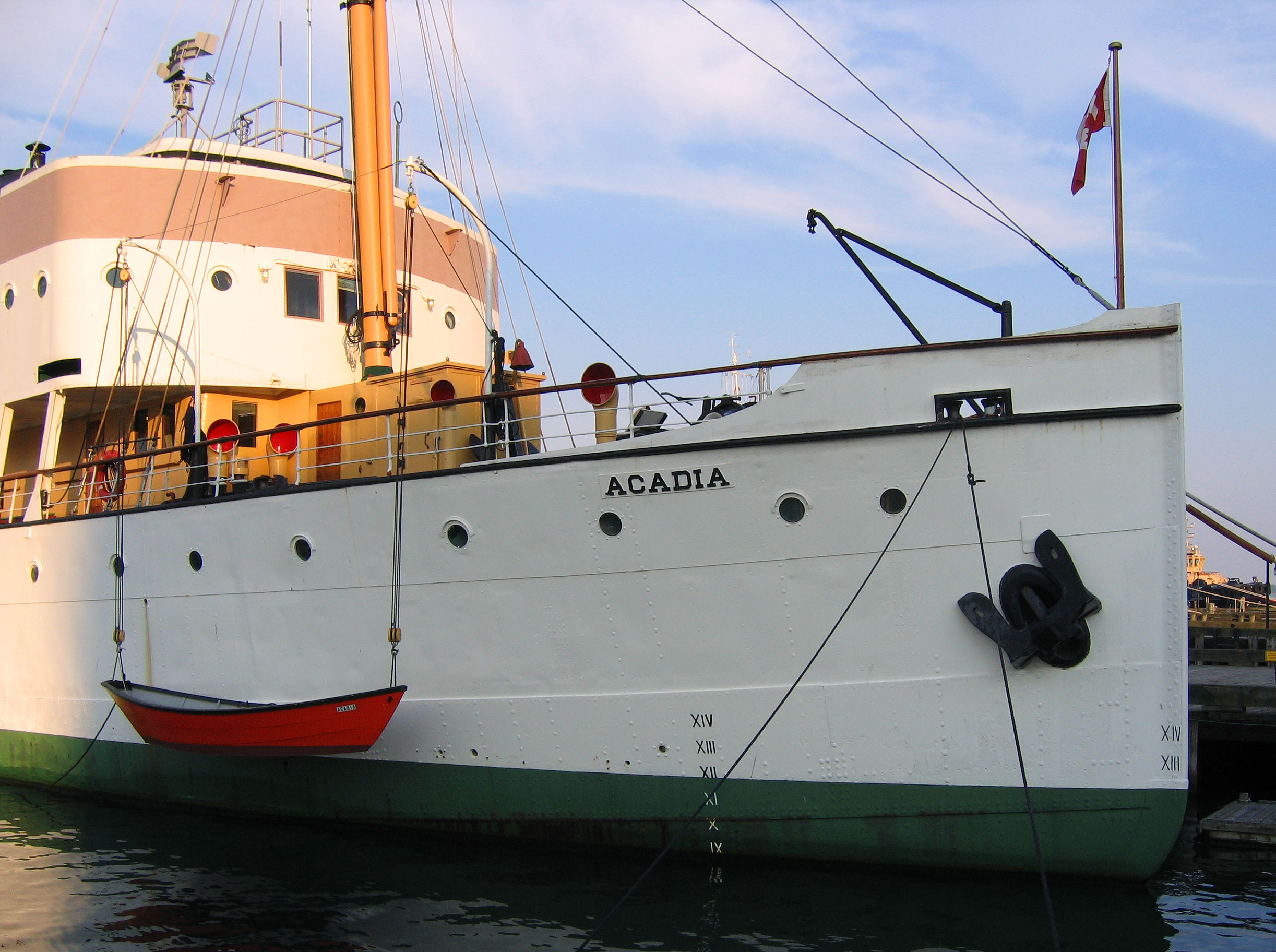
CSS Acadia, the museum's largest artifact.
- CSS Acadia, served as research from 1913 to 1968 and as a WWI and WWII patrol ship
- 70 small craft displayed in a Small Craft Gallery and boat sheds
- Working collection vessels which sail from the museum wharves include the ketch Elson Perry, the sloop Windekilda; and S-Class sloop Valkyrie
- Schooner Hebridee II

The corvette HMCS Sackville (K181) is not part of the Maritime Museum of the Atlantic but is located adjacent to the museum in the summer and works with the museum to interpret the Royal Canadian Navy.

== Event location ==
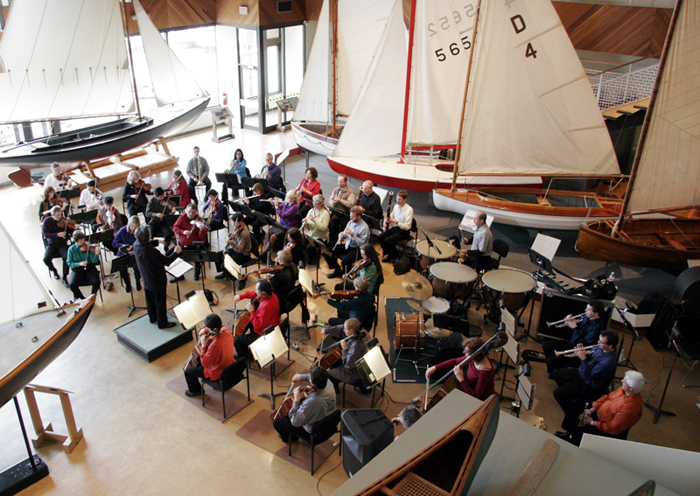
Symphony Nova Scotia performs at the museum's Small Craft Gallery

The museum's location on the Halifax waterfront has made the museum the site of several significant public events. In addition to being a stop on most Canadian federal election campaigns, the museum hosted meetings from the 1995 G7 Summit, as well a September 11 commemorative event in 2006 attended by Canada's Minister of Foreign Affairs, Peter MacKay and United States Secretary of State, Condoleezza Rice. The museum hosts an annual commemoration of the Battle of the Atlantic on the first Sunday of every May and Canadian Merchant Navy day every September 3.

== See also ==
- History of the Royal Canadian Navy
- List of museum ships
- Marine Museum of the Great Lakes
- Military history of Canada
- Military history of Nova Scotia
- Museum ship
- Naval Museum of Halifax
- Organization of Military Museums of Canada
- Ship replica
- Ships preserved in museums
- Theodore Too – full-size tugboat based on a model present in the museum
- Toronto Maritime Museum
