= CFB Cornwallis =

Former Canadian Forces Base in Nova Scotia

Coordinates: 44.6533°N 65.6293°W

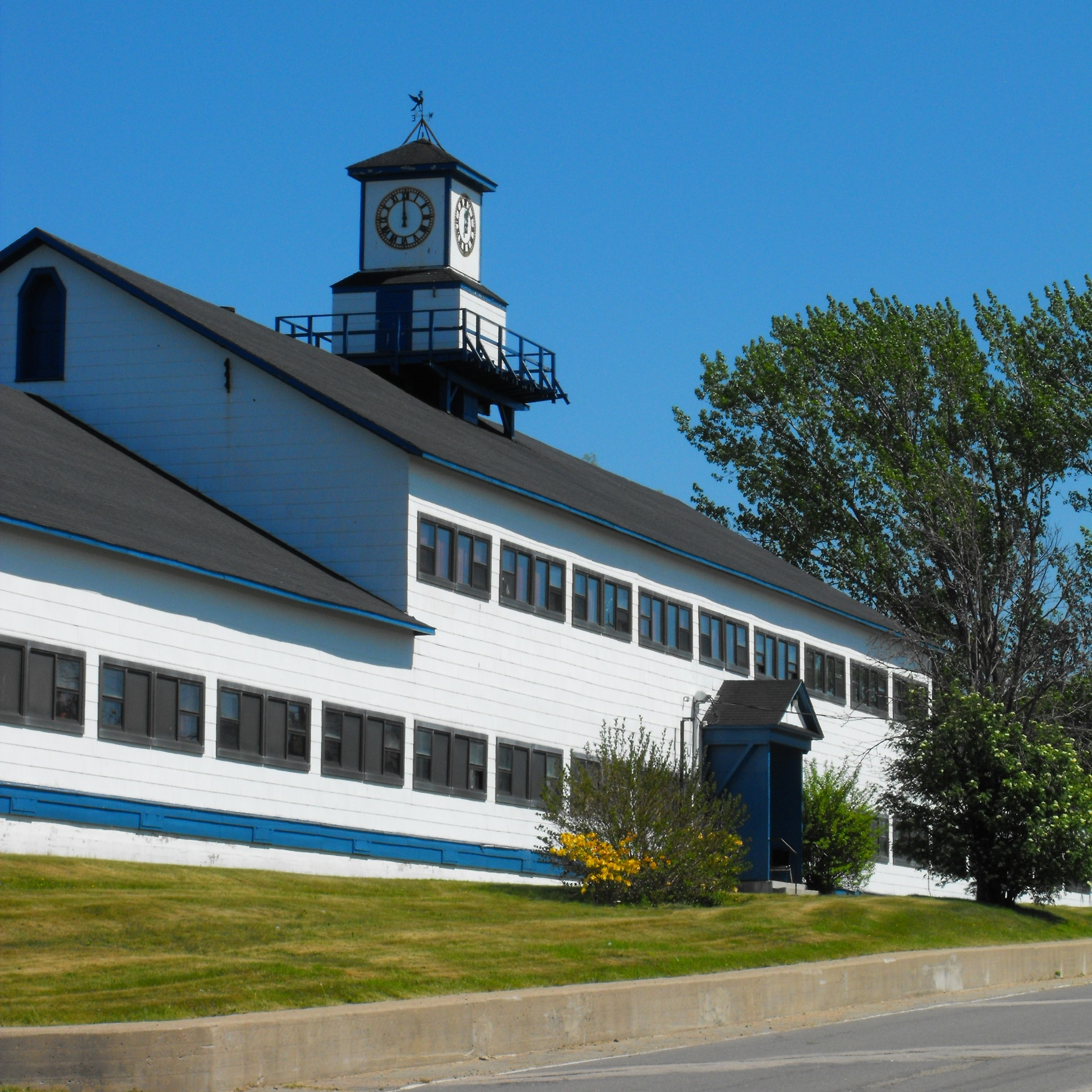
Former administration building - CFB Cornwallis

Canadian Forces Base Cornwallis (also CFB Cornwallis) is a former Canadian Forces Base located in Deep Brook, Nova Scotia.

It is situated in the western part of Annapolis County on the southern shore of the Annapolis Basin. Today most of the base is a civilian business park known as Cornwallis Park.

== HMCS Cornwallis ==
The rapid expansion of the Royal Canadian Navy during the early years of the Second World War saw many port facilities on the east coast of Canada become quickly taxed by operational requirements, particularly during the Battle of the Atlantic.

In early 1942, the Department of National Defence (DND) began examining the possibility of transferring naval recruit training to a new facility in southwestern Nova Scotia with convenient access to Halifax.

DND preferred the South Shore port town of Shelburne with its large natural harbour and deepwater port under development since fall 1941 at HMCS Shelburne (and an adjacent seaplane patrol base opened in spring 1942 at RCAF Station Shelburne), however it is presumed that political pressure from J.L. Ilsley, the federal Minister of Finance and MP for Digby—Annapolis—Kings forced DND to reconsider. A location in Ilsley's riding on the shallower but more protected Annapolis Basin straddling the western border of Clementsport and eastern border of Deep Brook was quickly adopted.

While the location for the training base was being sorted out, the actual training establishment was founded at a cost of $9 million at Halifax's HMC Dockyard on May 1, 1942, and was named HMCS Cornwallis in honour of Edward Cornwallis, the founder of Halifax.

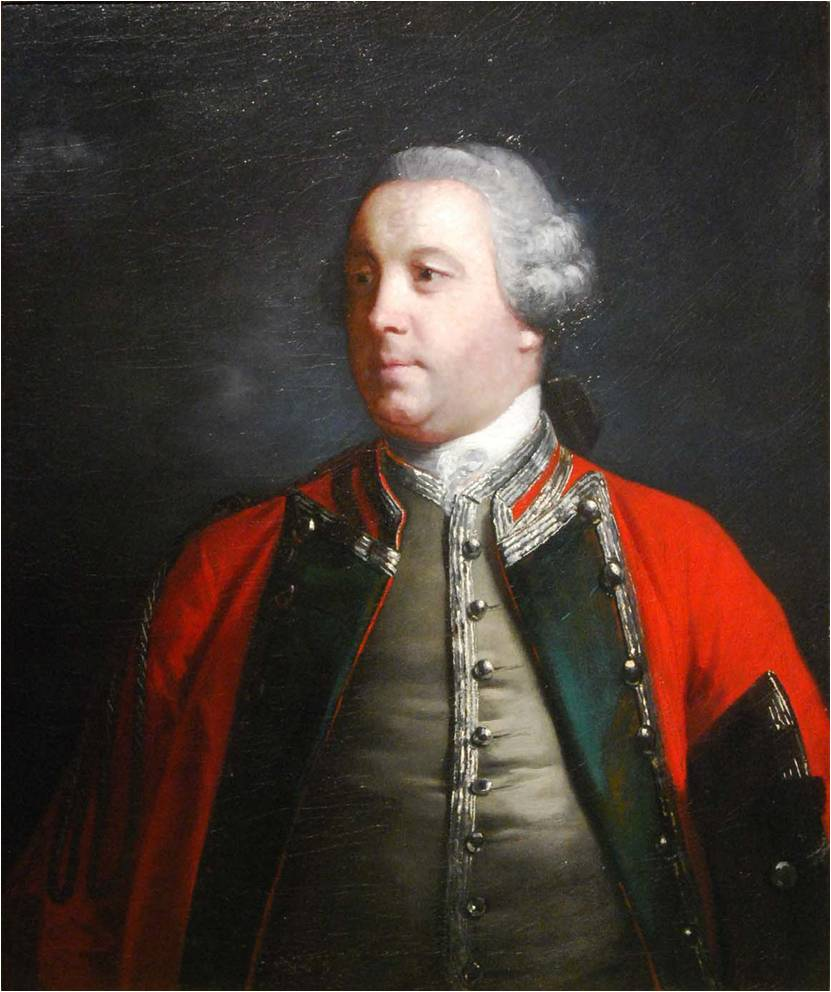
Edward Cornwallis by Sir Joshua Reynolds (1756)

With the location of the new base decided, construction began in June of that year with a budget of $15 million. The base occupied a small peninsula jutting into the Annapolis Basin several miles east of the mouth of the Bear River where a gypsum loading facility was located in Deep Brook. The property was relatively level and bisected by the mainline of the Dominion Atlantic Railway running from Yarmouth to Windsor Junction where it connected with CNR to Halifax and the rest of Canada.

New buildings were completed during the winter of 1942-1943 and the training establishment officially moved to the new base from HMC Dockyard on April 14, 1943, the date when HMCS Cornwallis was commissioned. the English-born architect Cecil Burgess designed 80 of the buildings constructed between 1942 and 1944. A booklet published ca. 1944 illustrates various aspects of wartime training at HMCS Cornwallis.

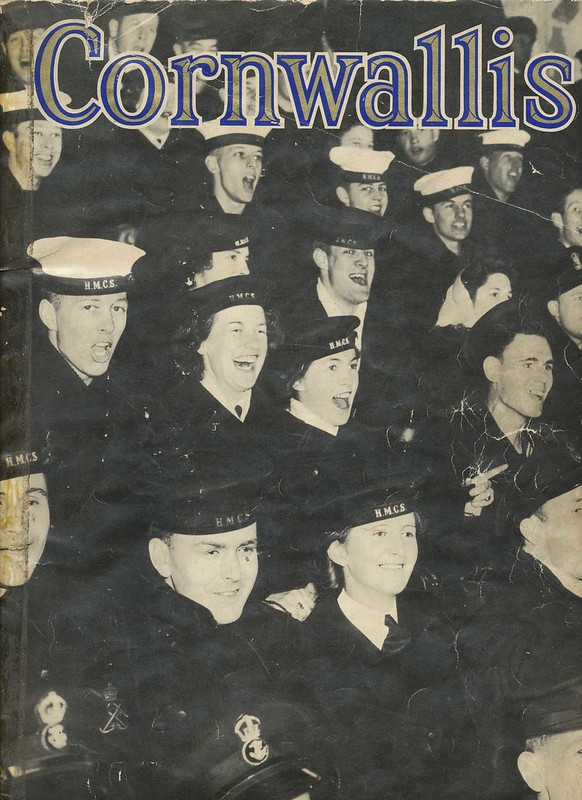

The RCN had a tremendous economic impact on the communities in western Annapolis County and eastern Digby County, with training personnel and recruits (when not in basic training) traveling around the local area. Approximately 2,500 personnel initially transferred with the training establishment from Halifax. The base would quickly grow to a peak strength of over 11,000 officers and enlisted personnel and recruits for the duration of the conflict, becoming the largest naval training facility for new recruits in the British Commonwealth in terms of the number of personnel being trained.

The Dominion Atlantic Railway operated special troop trains to the base's station and also relied on scheduled passenger service, connecting with Canadian Pacific Railway passenger trains from Saint John, New Brunswick (recruits would then take a CPR passenger ferry across the Bay of Fundy to nearby Digby) as well as Canadian National Railways passenger trains at Truro and Halifax.

HMCS Cornwallis extended from the small level peninsula on the Annapolis Basin south up the hillside overlooking the basin, providing suitable room for exercise and marches. A large firing range property was also developed immediately north of the Annapolis River at Granville Ferry, opposite the town of Annapolis Royal.

New recruits being trained as sailors for service in the RCN endured boot camp at HMCS Cornwallis, followed by specific naval training, including seamanship, boat handling, drill, self-defence, ropework, and weapons training. The duration of courses typically varied from 6–8 weeks, however the urgency of war sometimes shortened this period. Very few courses would receive sea training prior to active duty, although several RCN vessels were stationed at Cornwallis at various times for Anti-submarine warfare (ASW) training. These included Town-class destroyer HMCS Annapolis; Bangor-class minesweeper HMCS Quinte; armed yachts HMCS Sans Peur, HMCS Husky, and HMCS Vison. The auxiliary warship HMCS Acadia was also assigned to the base as a training vessel in 1944. Many newly commissioned RCN ships would have as few as a half-dozen experienced sailors on board for the maiden voyage, the bulk being raw recruits from HMCS Cornwallis.

Recruit training slowed and was halted at HMCS Cornwallis during the spring and summer of 1945 and following the end of World War II, the base was transformed into an opposite role, as a discharge centre for sailors where it assisted in processing thousands of naval personnel transitioning to civilian life. Following this spate of activity in the summer and fall of 1945, the base fell dormant and was declared surplus to the RCN on February 28, 1946, and turned over to the War Assets Corporation for disposal.

The disposal of HMCS Cornwallis was a slow process, given the sheer number of military properties across the nation that were undergoing a similar fate. During this period that the base lay dormant, the post office gave it the new name of Cornwallis, Nova Scotia for a postal outlet.

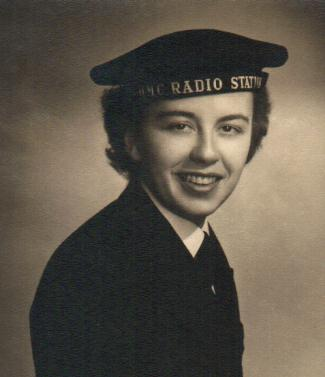
The WRENS started training for the RCN at HMCS Cornwallis in 1951. Doreen Nettie Patterson (1927–2000) was one of the recruits.

However the re-emergence of a military threat in the form of the Soviet Union saw the RCN reconsider using the base once again. The creation of NATO in 1948 was an impetus for the issuance of a "stop sale" order in June of that year and in September the navy reclaimed possession. Following renovations later that fall, the base was recommissioned as the RCN's training base HMCS Cornwallis on May 1, 1949. It was envisioned that the new HMCS Cornwallis would be ramped up to have a maximum of 800 recruits at any one time.

Despite the Cold War, the RCN was operating as a peacetime navy, so its first recruits through HMCS Cornwallis endured a 5-month new entry course. Canada's participation in the Korean War quickened the training pace, with the navy being mobilized for action in the Pacific Ocean. By the spring of 1951, recruit levels at HMCS Cornwallis were at 1,600, double the estimated intake that the reactivated facility was designed for.

Recruits with the Women's Royal Canadian Naval Service (WRCNS - Known as and referred to as "Wrens") started training at HMCS Cornwallis for the RCN on October 2, 1951. That month also saw the transfer to HMCS Cornwallis of the Communication Division of the Fleet School at HMC Dockyard in Halifax. This unit trained seamen and wrens in the communication trade (morse code and radio), while advanced courses were offered for officers and petty officers.

Officer cadets from the University Naval Training Divisions also trained in the summer at HMCS Cornwallis before Royal Roads Military College took over all officer training for the RCN.

Following the Korean War and through the remainder of the 1950s-1960s, HMCS Cornwallis functioned as the new recruit training centre for sailors entering the Royal Canadian Navy, with very little additional training for other ranks.

== CFB Cornwallis ==
The February 1, 1968 unification of the Royal Canadian Navy with the Royal Canadian Air Force and Canadian Army to form the Canadian Forces saw HMCS Cornwallis change its name to Canadian Forces Base Cornwallis, or CFB Cornwallis.

At the time of unification, many duplicate bases and facilities were being closed; however, it was determined that CFB Cornwallis would become home to the English-speaking division of the Canadian Forces Recruit School (CFRS) and would train recruits at the enlisted level destined for service with one of the three operational environments of the entire Canadian Forces (land, sea, or air). The French-speaking division of CFRS was located at CFB St-Jean.

CFB Cornwallis continued in this role through to its closure in 1994, when the base was identified as surplus to the requirements of the shrinking post-Cold War Canadian Forces. The last recruit course 9426 graduated on August 18 that year, and the base officially decommissioned in May 1995.

The closure of the base was not without controversy, as a series of memorial stained glass windows commemorating those lost in the Battle of the Atlantic were removed by the Canadian Forces from the base chapel and installed in a military chapel in CFB Halifax's Shannon Park housing development in Dartmouth.

== Cornwallis Park ==
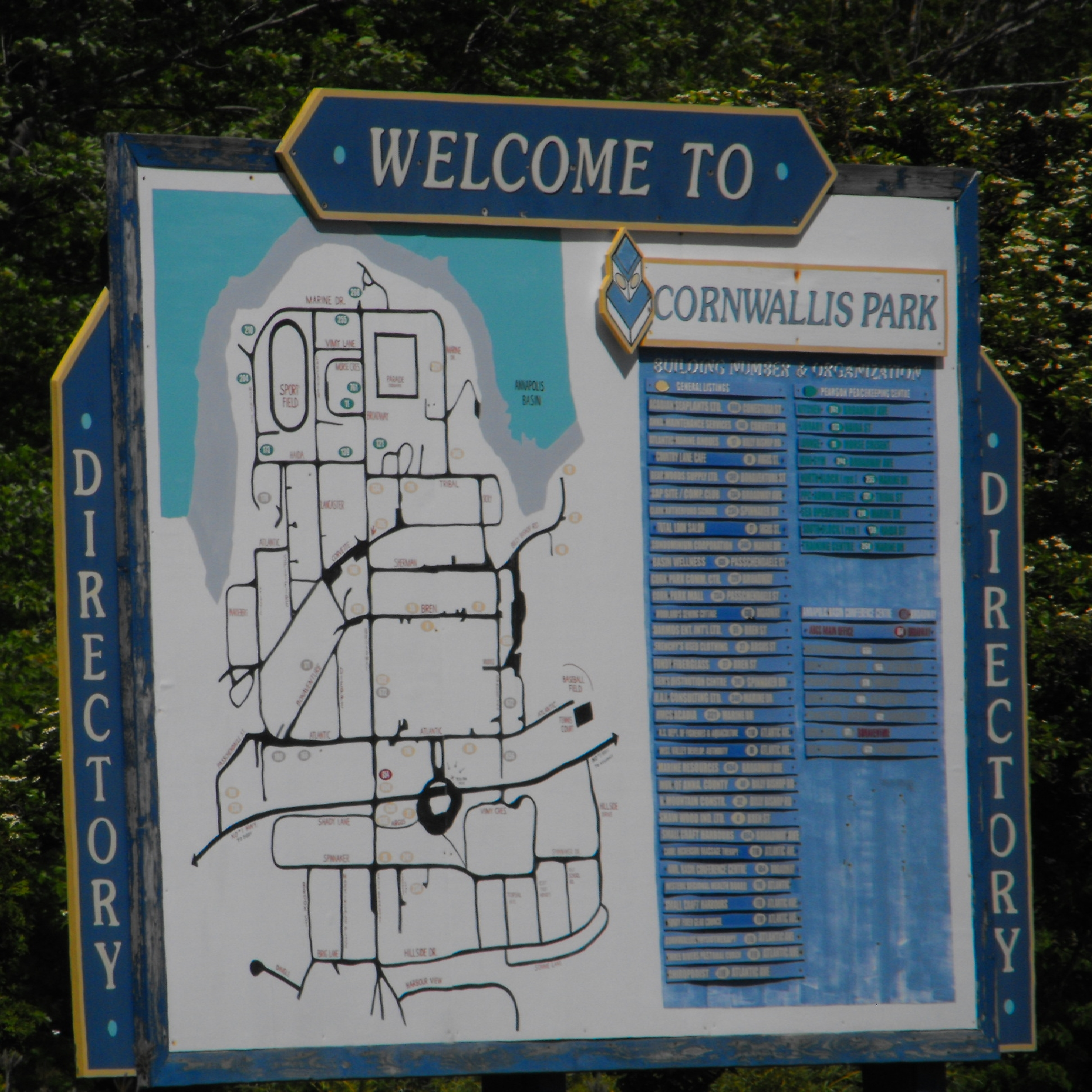
Welcome sign

Following decommissioning, the Government of Canada transferred the base property to the Government of Nova Scotia which in turn transferred it to a local development authority named Cornwallis Park Development Authority; the base property being marketed for civilian use as Cornwallis Park. The residences and permanent married quarters (PMQs) on the hill overlooking the Annapolis Basin were sold or rented to civilians, with the community being marketed as ideal for seniors and retirees with a "million dollar view." Since 2000, the provincial government has officially recognized the community for civic addressing purposes as being Cornwallis Park.

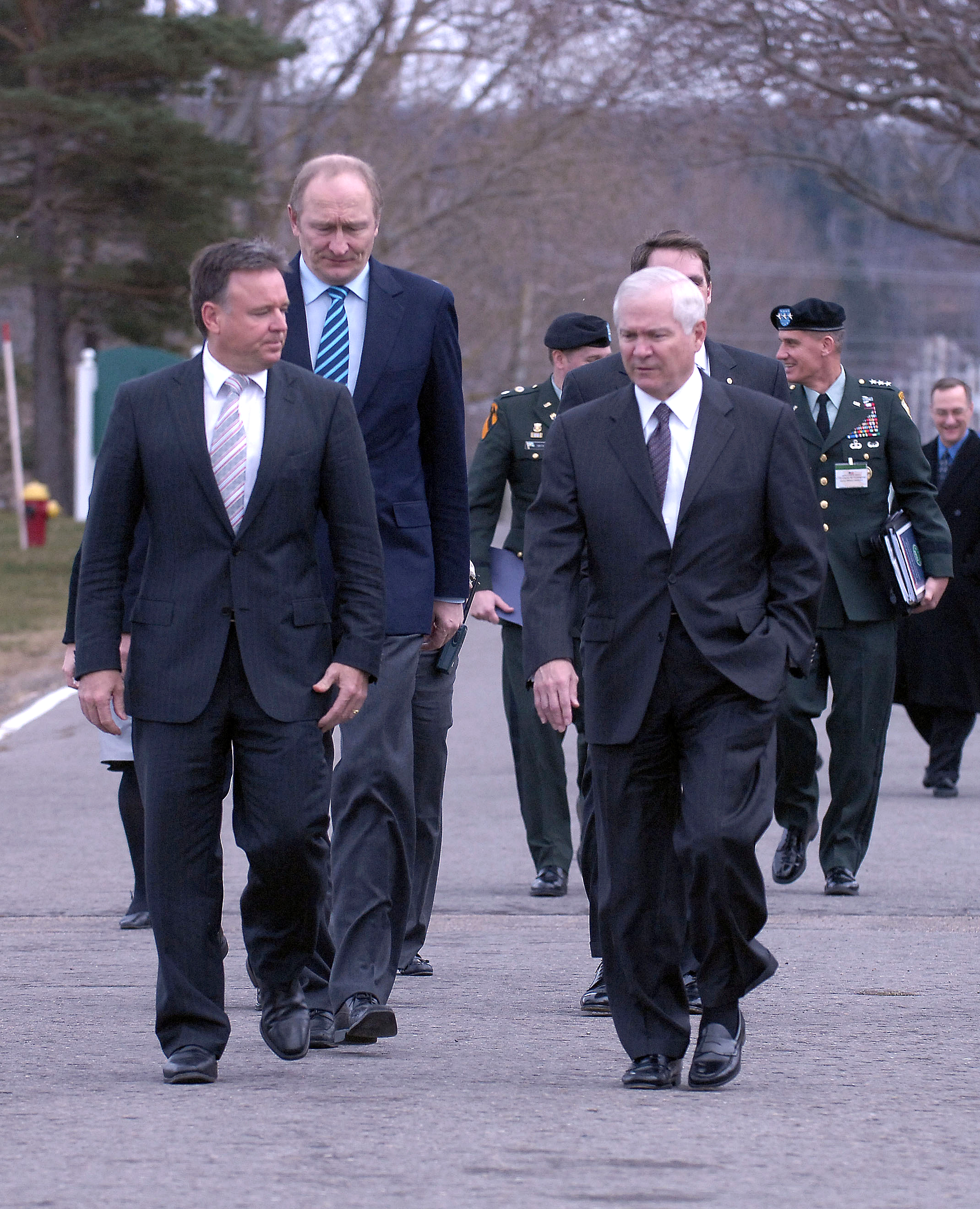
U.S. Defence Secretary Robert M. Gates walks with Australian Minister of Defence Joel Fitzgibbon and Estonia's Defence Minister Jaak Aaviksoo after a meeting at Cornwallis Park in 2008.

Other parts of the base were transformed into an industrial park with some companies being established as call centres, and others processing recycled tires, or lumber and forest products.

A small military presence remains at the base in the historic buildings fronting the old parade square with The CSTC HMCS Acadia sea cadet training centre operates in some of the barracks at Cornwallis Park during the summer months, training thousands of Royal Canadian Sea Cadets from across Atlantic Canada.

In 2008, the park hosted a meeting of the International Security Assistance Force's (ISAF) Regional Command South (RC-South), comprising forces from Canada, Australia, Denmark, Estonia, Netherlands, Romania, United Kingdom, and the United States.

The Pearson Peacekeeping Centre formerly occupied space at Cornwallis. It was established in 1994 to train Canadian and foreign soldiers in the art of peacekeeping and conflict resolution for postings with United Nations Peacekeeping missions. In late 2011, the Centre closed its Cornwallis Park office, ending a 17-year presence.
