= French ship Chameau =

Wooden sailing ship of the French Navy

Coordinates: 45.9°N 59.9°W

History

France
- Name: Chameau
- Launched: 1717
- Fate: Sank August 27, 1725

General characteristics
- Displacement: 540, 600 or 650 tons
- Beam: 31 feet (9.4 m)
- Draught: 15 feet (4.6 m)
- Armament: 22 × 12-pounder long guns; 22 × 6-pounder long guns

The French ship Chameau (French pronunciation: [ʃamo]) or Le Chameau (Camel) was a wooden sailing ship of the French Navy, built in 1717. She was used to transport passengers and supplies to New France (in present day Canada), making several trips. Nearing the end of her last voyage, a storm blew her onto some rocks on August 27, 1725. She sank, with the loss of all aboard; estimates range as high as 316 dead. In 1965, Alex Storm and his associates located the wreckage near Chameau Rock, and recovered a treasure of gold and silver pieces.

== Career ==
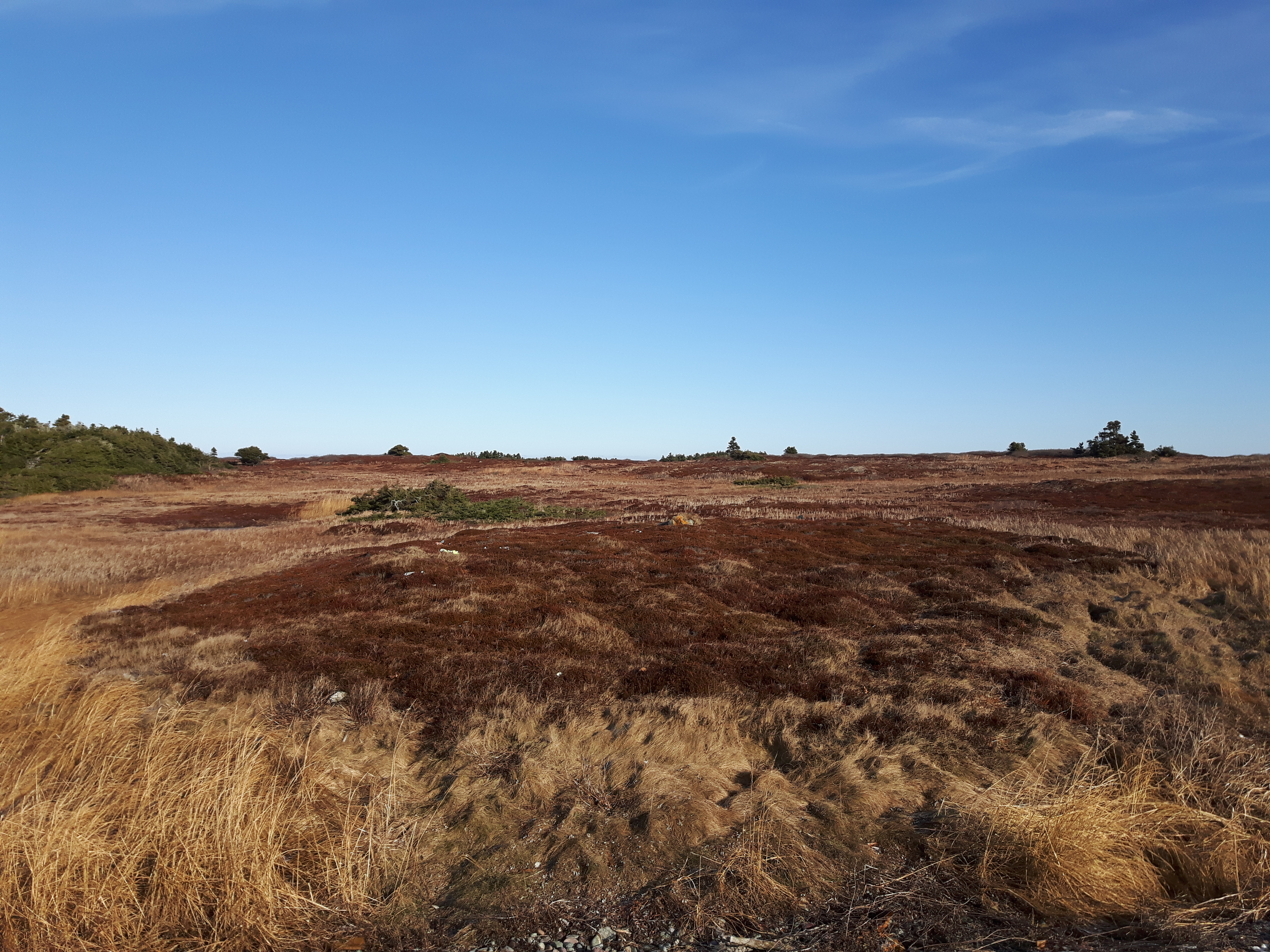
Gravesite of Le Chameau's passengers and crew

Chameau was built in Rochefort, France, in 1717, the brainchild of young naval architect Blaise Ollivier. After visiting English and Dutch shipyards, he envisioned a fast, yet well-armed naval transport called a flute. Chameau had a "keel of 135 feet (41 m), a width of 31 feet (9.4 m), and a draft of 15 feet (4.6 m)", and displaced 540, 600 or 650 tons. It was armed with "twenty 12-pounder cannons along the lower gun deck and two more in the stern. Twenty-two 6-pounders mounted on the upper deck completed a complement of 44 cannons."

From 1719 to 1725, she carried cargo, passengers, and funds from France to the French colony in North America and returned with passengers and cargo such as wood, wood tar, and beaver pelts. Between 1720 and 1724, she was "commanded successively by de Voutron, de Lamirande, de Beauharnois and Meschi".

Chameau set out from La Rochelle on her final voyage in July 1725, under the command of Jean de Saint James. Aboard was a large quantity of gold, silver and copper coins; and dignitaries de Chazel, the new Intendant; and de Louvigny, the Governor-Elect of Trois-Rivières. Several kilometres east of her destination of Louisbourg, the ship was swept onto the rocks by a storm on August 27, 1725. Chameau sank, and all aboard perished; the reported number of dead ranges from 216 to "over 300" to 316.

An unsuccessful attempt to salvage the cargo was made the following year.

== Discovery and legal disputes ==
In September 1965, Alex Storm, Dave MacEachern, and Harvey Macleod found the missing hull from the wreck of Chameau. This was where the treasure was located. Alex Storm brought up gold and silver coins. According to May 14, 1726, letter from the Minister of Marine, the funds lost amounted to "83,308 livres 11 sols 1 denier, including 27,258 livres 8 sols 9 deniers expended for clothing the troops at Quebec." By Storm's calculations, he "had made a nearly complete recovery of the funds shipped on the Chameau in 1725".

On April 7, 1966, an action was commenced in the Nova Scotia Supreme Court for an accounting among partners who had executed a partnership agreement with Alex Storm in 1961 for the expressed purpose of recovering the treasure. The agreement allowed for Storm to receive 20%. The problem was that this partnership failed to discover the treasure. Storm repeatedly tried to get the group together, but they continuously failed to show up for the search. As years passed by, he grew tired of waiting and decided to continue the search with new partners, but did not properly end the earlier partnership through proper legal channels. Storm formed a new partnership with two new members, who were successful in finding the treasure. The legal matter proceeded through the Nova Scotia Supreme Court, the Nova Scotia Court of Appeal and finally the Supreme Court of Canada. The Supreme Court of Canada, in handing down its decision, found the lower courts had been in error in several regards in arriving at their decisions and concluded Storm "was in clear breach of the Partnership Act and the partnership agreement". The Supreme Court of Canada was not in position to fix completely the errors made in the lower courts, however, and Storm received a majority of the treasure.

In December 1971, most of the coins and artifacts were auctioned off. Some of the artifacts are displayed in the Louisbourg Maritime Museum. An exhibit about Chameau is featured in the "Shipwreck Treasures of Nova Scotia" gallery at the Maritime Museum of the Atlantic in Halifax, Nova Scotia, which includes coins, navigational instruments, foodware and a rare bronze swivel cannon from the wreck.
