= Deep Brook, Nova Scotia =

Community in Nova Scotia, Canada

Coordinates: 44°38′10″N 65°39′20″W

Deep Brook in Nova Scotia

Deep Brook is a community in the Canadian province of Nova Scotia, located in Annapolis County. It is situated on the south shore of the Annapolis Basin and is on Nova Scotia Trunk 1.
