= Annapolis (provincial electoral district) =

Provincial electoral district in Nova Scotia, Canada

Nova Scotia electoral district

Provincial electoral district
- Legislature: Nova Scotia House of Assembly
MLA
David Bowlby
Progressive Conservative
- District created: 1867
- District abolished: 1953
- District re-created: 1993
- First contested: 1867, 1993
- Last contested: 2024

Demographics
- Population (2011): 20,591
- Electors (2021): 14,821
- Area (km²): 2,158
- Pop. density (per km²): 9.5
- Census division: Annapolis County
- Census subdivision(s): Annapolis Royal, Middleton

Annapolis is a provincial electoral district in Nova Scotia, Canada, that elects one member of the Nova Scotia House of Assembly.

The district was created in 1867 and was abolished in 1953 when it was re-distributed into Annapolis East and Annapolis West. The district was re-formed in 1993 and its boundaries were changed following the 2012 electoral reform commission to include the portion of Digby-Annapolis within Annapolis County north of Maitland Bridge.

The district includes the entirety of Annapolis County including the municipalities of Annapolis Royal and Middleton.

Since 2024, the district has been represented by David Bowlby.

== Geography ==
The electoral district of Annapolis has 2,158 km^{2} (833 sq mi) of landmass.

== Members of the Legislative Assembly ==
The electoral district has been represented by the following members of the Legislative Assembly:

Annapolis
Legislature	Years	Member	Party
Annapolis County
40th	1933–1937	John D. McKenzie	Liberal
41st	1937–1941	John D. McKenzie	Liberal
42nd	1941–1945	John D. McKenzie	Liberal
43rd	1945–1949	Henry Hicks	Liberal
44th	1949–1953	Henry Hicks	Liberal
45th	1953–1956	Henry Hicks	Liberal
District dissolved into Annapolis East (1956–1993) and Annapolis West (1956–1993)
District formed as Annapolis
56th	1993–1998	Earle Rafuse	Liberal
57th	1998–1999	Laurie Montgomery	Liberal
58th	1999–2003	Frank Chipman	Progressive Conservative
59th	2003–2006	Stephen McNeil	Liberal
60th	2006–2009	Stephen McNeil	Liberal
61st	2009–2013	Stephen McNeil	Liberal
62nd	2013–2017	Stephen McNeil	Liberal
63rd	2017–2021	Stephen McNeil	Liberal
64th	2021–2024	Carman Kerr	Liberal
65th	2024–present	David Bowlby	Progressive Conservative

Legislature	Years	Member	Party
Annapolis returned two members before 1933
39th	1928–1933	Harry Thompson MacKenzie	Progressive Conservative	Obediah Parker Goucher	Progressive Conservative
38th	1925–1928	Harry Thompson MacKenzie	Progressive Conservative	Obediah Parker Goucher	Progressive Conservative
37th	1920–1925	Orlando Daniels	Liberal	Frank R. Elliott	Liberal
36th	1916–1920	Orlando Daniels	Liberal	Frank R. Elliott	Liberal
35th	1913–1916	Orlando Daniels	Liberal	Norman Phinney	Liberal-Conservative
35th	1911–1916	Orlando Daniels	Liberal	Norman Phinney	Liberal-Conservative
34th	1906–1911	Orlando Daniels	Liberal	Joseph A. Bancroft	Liberal
33rd	1903–1906	James Wilberforce Longley	Liberal	Joseph A. Bancroft	Liberal
33rd	1901–1903	James Wilberforce Longley	Liberal	Joseph A. Bancroft	Liberal
32nd	1897–1901	James Wilberforce Longley	Liberal	Joseph A. Bancroft	Liberal
31st	1895–1897	James Wilberforce Longley	Liberal	Joseph A. Bancroft	Liberal
30th	1891–1894	James Wilberforce Longley	Liberal	Henry H. Chute	Liberal
29th	1886–1890	James Wilberforce Longley	Liberal	Frank Andrews	Liberal-Conservative
28th	1882–1886	James Wilberforce Longley	Liberal	Henry M. Munro	Liberal
27th	1878–1882	Caleb Shaffner	Conservative	William Botsford Troop	Conservative
26th	1874–1878	Avard Longley	Conservative	William Botsford Troop	Conservative
25th	1871–1874	David C. Landers	Liberal	Jared C. Troop	Liberal
24th	1867–1871	David C. Landers	Liberal	Jared C. Troop	Liberal

== Election results ==
=== 2024 ===
2024 Nova Scotia general election
Party	Candidate	Votes	%	±%
Progressive Conservative	David Bowlby	3,289	44.46	+12.17
Liberal	Carman Kerr	3,281	44.36	-5.26
New Democratic	Cheryl Burbidge	689	9.32	-3.90
Green	Sara Adams	138	1.87	-1.72
Total valid votes		7,397	99.21	
Total rejected ballots		59	0.79	+0.31
Turnout		7,456	46.82	-10.18
Eligible voters		15,925		
Progressive Conservative gain from Liberal		Swing		+8.71
Source: Elections Nova Scotia

=== 2021 ===
2021 Nova Scotia general election
Party	Candidate	Votes	%	±%	Expenditures
Liberal	Carman Kerr	4,231	49.62	-16.49	$62,306.44
Progressive Conservative	Jennifer Ehrenfeld-Poole	2,753	32.29	+17.38	$62,874.75
New Democratic	Cheryl Burbidge	1,127	13.22	-0.71	$27,596.93
Green	Krista Grear	306	3.59	-0.10	$4,098.82
Atlantica	Mark Robertson	109	1.28	-0.08	$200.00
Total valid votes/expense limit		8,526	99.52		$86,588.94
Total rejected ballots		41	0.48		
Turnout		8,567	57.00		
Eligible voters		15,030			
Liberal hold		Swing		-16.94	
Source: Elections Nova Scotia

=== 2017 ===
2017 provincial election redistributed results
Party	Vote	%
Liberal	5,540	66.12
Progressive Conservative	1,249	14.91
New Democratic	1,167	13.93
Green	309	3.69
Atlantica	114	1.36

2017 Nova Scotia general election
Party	Candidate	Votes	%	±%	Expenditures
Liberal	Stephen McNeil	6,410	64.73	-11.15	$49,422.05
New Democratic	Colin Sproul	1,517	15.32	+7.11	$39,062.68
Progressive Conservative	Ginny Hurlock	1,480	14.94	+1.27	$31,284.14
Green	Zac Crockatt	366	3.70	+1.46	$200.00
Atlantica	Kent Robinson	130	1.31		$2,844.92
Total valid votes/expense limit		9,903	99.62	+0.09	$90,230.82
Total rejected ballots		38	0.38	-0.09	
Turnout		9,941	58.86	-5.27	
Eligible voters		16,888			
Liberal hold		Swing		-9.13	
Source: Elections Nova Scotia

=== 2013 ===
2013 Nova Scotia general election
Party	Candidate	Votes	%	±%
Liberal	Stephen McNeil	7,710	75.88%	2.18%
Progressive Conservative	Ginny Hurlock	1,390	13.68%	2.58%
New Democratic	Henry Spurr	834	8.21%	-4.72%
Green	Ron Neufeld	227	2.23%	-0.03%
Total valid votes		10,161	100.00	
Total rejected ballots		48	0.47	
Turnout		10,209	64.13	
Eligible voters		15,919		
Source(s) Source: Nova Scotia Legislature (2024). "Electoral History for Annapolis" (PDF). nslegislature.ca. Nova Scotia, Chief Electoral Officer (2013). 39th Provincial General Election, October 8, 2013: Volume 1 – Statement of Votes & Statistics (PDF) (Report). Elections Nova Scotia. Archived from the original (PDF) on 10 April 2018.

=== 2009 ===
2009 Nova Scotia general election
Party	Candidate	Votes	%	±%
Liberal	Stephen McNeil	6,446	73.70%	17.45%
New Democratic	Henry Spurr	1,131	12.93%	-3.80%
Progressive Conservative	Kent Robinson	971	11.10%	-13.44%
Green	Jamie Spinney	198	2.26%	-0.21%
Total		8,746	–	
Source(s) Source: Nova Scotia Legislature (2024). "Electoral History for Annapolis" (PDF). nslegislature.ca.

=== 2006 ===
2006 Nova Scotia general election
Party	Candidate	Votes	%	±%
Liberal	Stephen McNeil	4,678	56.25%	5.43%
Progressive Conservative	Blair C. Hannam	2,041	24.54%	-6.87%
New Democratic	Calum MacKenzie	1,391	16.73%	1.05%
Green	Ken McGowan	206	2.48%	–
Total		8,316	–	
Source(s) Source: Nova Scotia Legislature (2024). "Electoral History for Annapolis" (PDF). nslegislature.ca.

=== 2003 ===
2003 Nova Scotia general election
Party	Candidate	Votes	%	±%
Liberal	Stephen McNeil	4,522	50.83%	15.60%
Progressive Conservative	Frank Chipman	2,795	31.42%	-12.02%
New Democratic	Adrian Nette	1,395	15.68%	-2.75%
Nova Scotia Party	Harry Wilson	185	2.08%	-0.84%
Total		8,897	–	
Source(s) Source: Nova Scotia Legislature (2024). "Electoral History for Annapolis" (PDF). nslegislature.ca.

=== 1999 ===
1999 Nova Scotia general election
Party	Candidate	Votes	%	±%
Progressive Conservative	Frank Chipman	4,026	43.43%	9.15%
Liberal	Stephen McNeil	3,265	35.22%	-1.74%
New Democratic	Tom Clahane	1,708	18.43%	-8.03%
Nova Scotia Party	Paul Mann	271	2.92%	–
Total		9,270	–	
Source(s) Source: Nova Scotia Legislature (2024). "Electoral History for Annapolis" (PDF). nslegislature.ca. Nova Scotia, Chief Electoral Officer (1999). Returns of the General Election for the House of Assembly, Thirty-Fifth General Election (Report). Elections Nova Scotia.

=== 1998 ===
1998 Nova Scotia general election
Party	Candidate	Votes	%	±%
Liberal	Laurie Montgomery	3,448	36.96%	-25.93%
Progressive Conservative	Basil Stewart	3,198	34.28%	3.94%
New Democratic	John Kinsella	2,468	26.46%	19.68%
Independent	Bob Mann	215	2.30%	–
Total		9,329	–	
Source(s) Source: Nova Scotia Legislature (2024). "Electoral History for Annapolis" (PDF). nslegislature.ca.

=== 1993 ===
1993 Nova Scotia general election
Party	Candidate	Votes	%
Liberal	Earle Rafuse	7,022	62.89%
Progressive Conservative	Greg Kerr	3,388	30.34%
New Democratic	Margaret Wolfe	756	6.77%
Total		11,166	–
Source(s) Source: Nova Scotia Legislature (2024). "Electoral History for Annapolis" (PDF). nslegislature.ca. Nova Scotia, Chief Electoral Officer (1993). Returns of the General Election for the House of Assembly, Thirty-Third General Election (PDF) (Report). Queen's Printer. Archived from the original (PDF) on 18 June 2018.

=== 1953 ===
1953 Nova Scotia general election: Annapolis County
Party	Candidate	Votes	%	±%
Liberal	Henry Hicks	5,006	51.55%	-0.74%
Progressive Conservative	Charles F. LeBrun	4,705	48.45%	2.77%
Total		9,711	–	
Source(s) Source: Nova Scotia Legislature (2024). "Electoral History for Annapolis County" (PDF). nslegislature.ca. Nova Scotia Legislature (1953). Returns of the General Election for the House of Assembly (PDF) (Report). Queen's Printer. Archived from the original (PDF) on 10 September 2018.

=== 1949 ===
1949 Nova Scotia general election: Annapolis County
Party	Candidate	Votes	%	±%
Liberal	Henry Hicks	5,091	52.29%	-6.77%
Progressive Conservative	Harry Thompson MacKenzie	4,447	45.68%	4.73%
Co-operative Commonwealth	Louisa Anna Shaw	198	2.03%	–
Total		9,736	–	
Source(s) Source: Nova Scotia Legislature (2024). "Electoral History for Annapolis County" (PDF). nslegislature.ca. Nova Scotia Legislature (1949). Returns of the General Election for the House of Assembly (PDF) (Report). Queen's Printer. Archived from the original (PDF) on 10 September 2018.

=== 1945 ===
1945 Nova Scotia general election: Annapolis County
Party	Candidate	Votes	%	±%
Liberal	Henry Hicks	4,880	59.06%	-1.55%
Progressive Conservative	Horton Wheelock Phinney	3,383	40.94%	1.55%
Total		8,263	–	
Source(s) Source: Nova Scotia Legislature (2024). "Electoral History for Annapolis County" (PDF). nslegislature.ca. Nova Scotia Legislature (1945). Returns of the General Election for the House of Assembly (PDF) (Report). Queen's Printer. Archived from the original (PDF) on 10 September 2018.

=== 1941 ===
1941 Nova Scotia general election: Annapolis County
Party	Candidate	Votes	%	±%
Liberal	John D. McKenzie	4,292	60.60%	3.26%
Progressive Conservative	Hanson Dowell	2,790	39.40%	-3.26%
Total		7,082	–	
Source(s) Source: Nova Scotia Legislature (2024). "Electoral History for Annapolis County" (PDF). nslegislature.ca. Nova Scotia Legislature (1941). Returns of the General Election for the House of Assembly (PDF) (Report). Queen's Printer. Archived from the original (PDF) on 8 February 2024.

=== 1937 ===
1937 Nova Scotia general election: Annapolis County
Party	Candidate	Votes	%	±%
Liberal	John D. McKenzie	4,977	57.35%	2.00%
Progressive Conservative	James Eugene Morse	3,702	42.65%	–
Total		8,679	–	
Source(s) Source: Nova Scotia Legislature (2024). "Electoral History for Annapolis County" (PDF). nslegislature.ca. Nova Scotia Legislature (1937). Returns of the General Election for the House of Assembly (PDF) (Report). Queen's Printer. Archived from the original (PDF) on 1 March 2019.

=== 1933 ===
1933 Nova Scotia general election: Annapolis County
Party	Candidate	Votes	%	±%
Liberal	John D. McKenzie	4,917	55.35%	6.83%
Liberal-Conservative	Obediah Parker Goucher	3,967	44.65%	-6.83%
Total		8,884	–	
Source(s) Source: Nova Scotia Legislature (2024). "Electoral History for Annapolis County" (PDF). nslegislature.ca. Nova Scotia Legislature (1933). Returns of the General Election for the House of Assembly (PDF) (Report). Queen's Printer. Archived from the original (PDF) on 1 March 2019.

=== 1928 ===
1928 Nova Scotia general election: Annapolis County
Party	Candidate	Votes	%	Elected
Liberal-Conservative	Obediah Parker Goucher	3,689	25.90%	✓
Liberal-Conservative	Harry Thompson MacKenzie	3,645	25.59%	✓
Liberal	Daniel Owen	3,461	24.30%	
Liberal	John D. McKenzie	3,450	24.22%	
Total		14,245	–	
Source(s) Source: Nova Scotia Legislature (2024). "Electoral History for Annapolis County" (PDF). nslegislature.ca.

=== 1925 ===
1925 Nova Scotia general election: Annapolis County
Party	Candidate	Votes	%	Elected
Liberal-Conservative	Obediah Parker Goucher	4,331	29.46%	✓
Liberal-Conservative	Harry Thompson MacKenzie	4,133	28.12%	✓
Liberal	Frank R. Elliott	3,165	21.53%	
Liberal	Kenneth L. Crowell	3,071	20.89%	
Total		14,700	–	
Source(s) Source: Nova Scotia Legislature (2024). "Electoral History for Annapolis County" (PDF). nslegislature.ca.

=== 1920 ===
1920 Nova Scotia general election: Annapolis County
Party	Candidate	Votes	%	Elected
Liberal	Orlando Daniels	3,630	30.41%	✓
Liberal	Frank R. Elliott	3,330	27.90%	✓
United Farmers	Vernon B. Leonard	2,512	21.05%	
United Farmers	Edgar C. Shaffner	2,463	20.64%	
Total		11,935	–	
Source(s) Source: Nova Scotia Legislature (2024). "Electoral History for Annapolis County" (PDF). nslegislature.ca.

=== 1916 ===
1916 Nova Scotia general election: Annapolis County
Party	Candidate	Votes	%	Elected
Liberal	Orlando Daniels	2,149	26.34%	✓
Liberal	Frank R. Elliott	2,077	25.46%	✓
Liberal-Conservative	Obediah Parker Goucher	2,020	24.76%	
Liberal-Conservative	Earle C. Phinney	1,912	23.44%	
Total		8,158	–	
Source(s) Source: Nova Scotia Legislature (2024). "Electoral History for Annapolis County" (PDF). nslegislature.ca.

=== 1911 ===
Nova Scotia provincial by-election, 1911-11-08: Annapolis County
Party	Candidate	Votes	%	Elected
Liberal	Orlando Daniels	acclaimed	N/A	✓
Total			–	
Source(s) Source: Nova Scotia Legislature (2024). "Electoral History for Annapolis County" (PDF). nslegislature.ca.

=== 1911 ===
1911 Nova Scotia general election: Annapolis County
Party	Candidate	Votes	%	Elected
Liberal	Orlando Daniels	2,092	26.74%	✓
Liberal-Conservative	Norman Phinney	1,938	24.77%	✓
Liberal-Conservative	Avard Longley Davidson	1,931	24.68%	
Liberal	J. R. Hall	1,863	23.81%	
Total		7,824	–	
Source(s) Source: Nova Scotia Legislature (2024). "Electoral History for Annapolis County" (PDF). nslegislature.ca.

=== 1906 ===
1906 Nova Scotia general election: Annapolis County
Party	Candidate	Votes	%	Elected
Liberal	Orlando Daniels	2,062	29.46%	✓
Liberal	Joseph A. Bancroft	1,826	26.09%	✓
Liberal-Conservative	Avard Longley Davidson	1,674	23.91%	
Liberal-Conservative	Alfred Whitman	1,438	20.54%	
Total		7,000	–	
Source(s) Source: Nova Scotia Legislature (2024). "Electoral History for Annapolis County" (PDF). nslegislature.ca.

=== 1906 by-election ===
Nova Scotia provincial by-election, 1906-03-06: Annapolis County
Party	Candidate	Votes	%	Elected
Liberal	Orlando Daniels	1,907	62.30%	✓
Prohibition	Joseph Gaetz	1,154	37.70%	
Total		3,061	–	
Source(s) Source: Nova Scotia Legislature (2024). "Electoral History for Annapolis County" (PDF). nslegislature.ca.

=== 1901 ===
1901 Nova Scotia general election: Annapolis County
Party	Candidate	Votes	%	Elected
Liberal	James Wilberforce Longley	1,825	29.60%	✓
Liberal	Joseph A. Bancroft	1,750	28.39%	✓
Liberal-Conservative	W.C. Healey	1,348	21.87%	
Liberal-Conservative	Frank Andrews	1,242	20.15%	
Total		6,165	–	
Source(s) Source: Nova Scotia Legislature (2024). "Electoral History for Annapolis County" (PDF). nslegislature.ca.

=== 1897 ===
1897 Nova Scotia general election: Annapolis County
Party	Candidate	Votes	%	Elected
Liberal	Joseph A. Bancroft	1,878	26.48%	✓
Liberal	James Wilberforce Longley	1,871	26.38%	✓
Liberal-Conservative	Thomas R. Jones	1,680	23.69%	
Liberal-Conservative	C. S. Harrington	1,664	23.46%	
Total		7,093	–	
Source(s) Source: Nova Scotia Legislature (2024). "Electoral History for Annapolis County" (PDF). nslegislature.ca.

=== 1896 by-election ===
Nova Scotia provincial by-election, 1896-06-15: Annapolis County
Party	Candidate	Votes	%	Elected
Liberal	James Wilberforce Longley	acclaimed	N/A	✓
Total			–	
Source(s) Source: Nova Scotia Legislature (2024). "Electoral History for Annapolis County" (PDF). nslegislature.ca.

=== 1894 ===
1894 Nova Scotia general election: Annapolis County
Party	Candidate	Votes	%	Elected
Liberal	James Wilberforce Longley	1,808	27.18%	✓
Liberal	Joseph A. Bancroft	1,793	26.95%	✓
Liberal-Conservative	Thomas R. Jones	1,555	23.38%	
Liberal-Conservative	Hugh E. Gillis	1,496	22.49%	
Total		6,652	–	
Source(s) Source: Nova Scotia Legislature (2024). "Electoral History for Annapolis County" (PDF). nslegislature.ca.

=== 1892 by-election ===
Nova Scotia provincial by-election, 1892-06-08: Annapolis County
Party	Candidate	Votes	%	Elected
Liberal	Henry M. Munro	958	68.92%	✓
Liberal-Conservative	John W. Crosskill	432	31.08%	
Total		1,390	–	
Source(s) Source: Nova Scotia Legislature (2024). "Electoral History for Annapolis County" (PDF). nslegislature.ca.

=== 1890 ===
1890 Nova Scotia general election: Annapolis County
Party	Candidate	Votes	%	Elected
Liberal	James Wilberforce Longley	1,884	27.33%	✓
Liberal	Harris H. Chute	1,844	26.75%	✓
Liberal-Conservative	C. S. Harrington	1,622	23.53%	
Liberal-Conservative	B. Starratt	1,543	22.39%	
Total		6,893	–	
Source(s) Source: Nova Scotia Legislature (2024). "Electoral History for Annapolis County" (PDF). nslegislature.ca.

=== 1886 ===
1886 Nova Scotia general election: Annapolis County
Party	Candidate	Votes	%	Elected
Liberal	James Wilberforce Longley	1,556	25.25%	✓
Liberal-Conservative	Frank Andrews	1,540	24.99%	✓
Liberal	Henry M. Munro	1,535	24.91%	
Liberal-Conservative	R. J. Ellison	1,531	24.85%	
Total		6,162	–	
Source(s) Source: Nova Scotia Legislature (2024). "Electoral History for Annapolis County" (PDF). nslegislature.ca.

=== 1882 ===
1882 Nova Scotia general election: Annapolis County
Party	Candidate	Votes	%	Elected
Liberal	James Wilberforce Longley	1,340	26.06%	✓
Liberal	Henry M. Munro	1,329	25.85%	✓
Liberal-Conservative	Caleb Shaffner	1,261	24.52%	
Liberal-Conservative	William Botsford Troop	1,212	23.57%	
Total		5,142	–	
Source(s) Source: Nova Scotia Legislature (2024). "Electoral History for Annapolis County" (PDF). nslegislature.ca.

=== 1878 ===
1878 Nova Scotia general election: Annapolis County
Party	Candidate	Votes	%	Elected
Liberal-Conservative	William Botsford Troop	1,350	26.77%	✓
Liberal-Conservative	Caleb Shaffner	1,295	25.68%	✓
Liberal	O.M. Taylor	1,235	24.49%	
Liberal	E. Bent	1,163	23.06%	
Total		5,043	–	
Source(s) Source: Nova Scotia Legislature (2024). "Electoral History for Annapolis County" (PDF). nslegislature.ca.

=== 1874 ===
1874 Nova Scotia general election: Annapolis County
Party	Candidate	Votes	%	Elected
Liberal-Conservative	Avard Longley	1,211	27.55%	✓
Liberal-Conservative	William Botsford Troop	1,177	26.78%	✓
Liberal	E. Bent	1,013	23.05%	
Liberal	Parker	994	22.62%	
Total		4,395	–	
Source(s) Source: Nova Scotia Legislature (2024). "Electoral History for Annapolis County" (PDF). nslegislature.ca.

=== 1871 ===
1871 Nova Scotia general election: Annapolis County
Party	Candidate	Votes	%	Elected
Liberal	Jared C. Troop	1,083	26.03%	✓
Liberal	David C. Landers	1,076	25.86%	✓
Liberal-Conservative	Avard Longley	1,017	24.44%	
Liberal-Conservative	T.W. Chesley	985	23.67%	
Total		4,161	–	
Source(s) Source: Nova Scotia Legislature (2024). "Electoral History for Annapolis County" (PDF). nslegislature.ca.

=== 1867 ===
1867 Nova Scotia general election: Annapolis County
Party	Candidate	Votes	%	Elected
Anti-Confederation	Jared C. Troop	1,187	27.16%	✓
Anti-Confederation	David C. Landers	1,163	26.61%	✓
Confederation	W. T. Foster	1,019	23.31%	
Confederation	George Whitman	1,002	22.92%	
Total		4,371	–	
Source(s) Source: Nova Scotia Legislature (2024). "Electoral History for Annapolis County" (PDF). nslegislature.ca.

== See also ==
- List of Nova Scotia provincial electoral districts
- Canadian provincial electoral districts
