= Douglas A. Webber =

Canadian architect (1901–1971)

- Born: 1901; Lake Charlotte, Nova Scotia, Canada
- Died: 1971 (aged 69–70)
- Occupation: Architect
- Years active: 1932–1967

Douglas A. Webber (1901 – July 1971) was a Canadian architect from Nova Scotia. Born in Lake Charlotte, he studied engineering and architecture in Chicago and lived in New England before returning to Nova Scotia. He began his architecture practice in Dartmouth in 1932. Webber designed several schools and other buildings in Nova Scotia; his Granville Street office in Halifax was responsible for the design and planning of the first rural high school in Nova Scotia, located in Middleton. He co-founded Webber, Harrington & Associates in 1960, which continued operating as WHW Architects until merging into Architecture 49 in 2014.

== Early life and education ==
Douglas A. Webber was born in 1901 in Lake Charlotte, Nova Scotia as the son of Howard Douglas Webber. He went to Chicago to study engineering, and graduated with a Bachelor of Science (BSc) in architecture. He subsequently became a member of the American Institute of Civil Engineering. He married Ann Scott in 1925 in Boston, and stayed in New England for several years before returning to Nova Scotia.

== Career ==
After returning to Nova Scotia, Webber became employed at the Halifax Harbour Commission in 1932 and began practicing architecture from his residence in Dartmouth. He began working at the Nova Scotia Department of Highways in 1936, and a year later became a member of the Royal Architectural Institute of Canada (RAIC) and the Nova Scotia Association of Architects (NSAA).

During the Second World War, Webber served in the Royal Canadian Engineers. He held the rank of Captain with the 2nd Fortress Company and was their second-in-command. Following the war he resumed his career in architecture, opening a private practice on Granville Street in Halifax, across the street from Province House. His Granville Street office planned and designed the first rural high school in Nova Scotia, the Middleton Regional High School.

In 1952, Webber moved his practice to a brick house on Barrington Street. Here, he designed the Science Building of the Nova Scotia Agricultural College. He designed a residence for L.A. Kitz in 1955, and the Bank of Montreal branch on Quinpool Road, both of which were featured in the RAIC Journal.

Webber moved to Bedford in 1957, where he created the company Webber, Harrington & Associates with fellow architect M. H. F. Harrington in 1960. Their firm designed the Nova Scotia Institute of Technology in 1961, followed by the Dalhousie Law School in 1965, and the Construction Association of Nova Scotia building in 1969.

== Later life and death ==
Webber retired in 1967, and moved to Chester. He died in July 1971. His firm carried on after his death with M. H. F. Harrington as president. The firm continued to operate as WHW Architects until 2014, when it merged with five other firms to form Architecture 49.

== Buildings designed ==
- The Findlay School – Dartmouth, NS (1931)
- Middleton Regional High School – Middleton, NS (1948)
- Amherst Regional High School – Amherst, NS (1952)
- Bridgetown Regional High School – Bridgetown, NS (1956)
- Hants East Rural High School – Milford, NS (1957)
- Soldiers Memorial Hospital – Middleton, NS (1960)
