= Halifax and South Western Railway =

Historic Canadian railway

Halifax and Southwestern Railway

Overview
- Headquarters: Bridgewater, Nova Scotia
- Reporting mark: H&SW
- Locale: Nova Scotia, Canada
- Dates of operation: 1901–1918

Technical
- Track gauge: 4 ft 8 1/2 in (1,435 mm) standard gauge

The Halifax and South Western Railway (reporting mark H&SW) was a historic Canadian railway operating in the province of Nova Scotia.

The legal name of this railway was the Halifax & South Western Railway, as is defined in various Acts of the Nova Scotia Legislature, such as 1902 c.1, Act respecting the Halifax & South Western Railway Co.. However, Halifax & Southwestern Railway is also sometimes also used.

The H&SW was created in spring 1901 when William Mackenzie and Donald Mann approached the provincial government with plans to finish the abortive plans for a railway from Halifax to Yarmouth along the province's South Shore. For many years, the line had significant curvature throughout its length, a result of the rugged local topography, which earned it the moniker, "Hellish Slow & Wobbly".

== Predecessors ==
The H&SW was not the first railway to build on the South Shore of Nova Scotia, as various charters for railway companies had preceded it.

The Nova Scotia Central Railway (NSCR) had opened its line between Middleton in the Annapolis Valley and Lunenburg, by way of Bridgewater, on December 23, 1889.

In 1893, the Coast Railway Company of Nova Scotia was incorporated under a charter to build a narrow gauge line between Yarmouth and Lockeport, by way of Barrington and Shelburne. Construction took place very slowly and what little trackage had been already built was converted to standard gauge in 1895. In 1899 the company was renamed the Halifax and Yarmouth Railway (H&YR) and received a new charter to build east from Lockeport to Liverpool, Bridgewater and Halifax. By 1903 the line had barely reached Barrington.

The Liverpool and Milton Tramway also built a short railway up the Mersey River valley between Liverpool and a pulp mill near Milton in Queens County in 1896, opening on February 1, 1897. It was renamed the Liverpool and Milton Railway (L&MR) in 1900.

== Mergers and construction ==
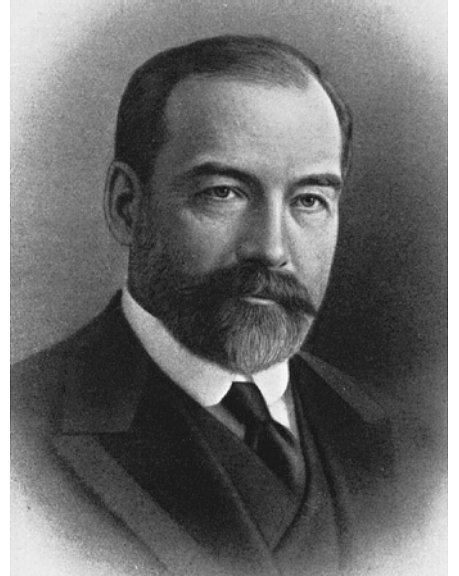
Donald Mann

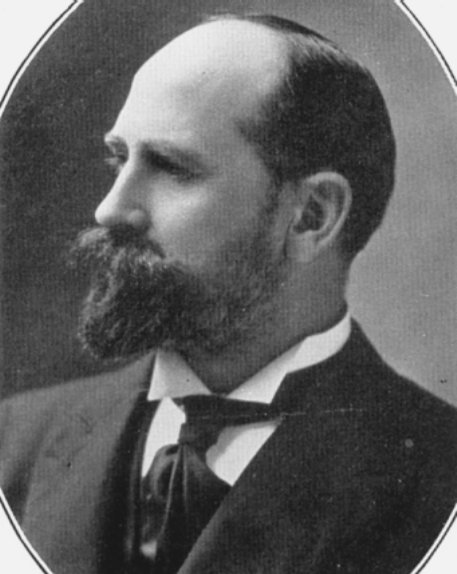
Sir William Mackenzie

The H&SW was created in spring 1901 when Mackenzie and Mann approached the provincial government with plans to finish the abortive plans for a railway from the City of Halifax to Yarmouth. Experienced railway engineers, MacKenzie and Mann already owned 3,200 kilometres (2,000 mi) in track in Canada by this time. On July 1, 1902, the H&SW purchased the NSCR with its line from Mahone Bay to Bridgewater, forming part of the new mainline between Bridgewater and Halifax. The new construction between Halifax and Mahone Bay was completed by 1904.

On April 11, 1903, the H&SW purchased the Nova Scotia Southern Railway (NSSR). The NSSR had no trackage constructed, however it did have a charter to build from the NSCR at New Germany to Caledonia in what was rich timber territory. Upon acquiring the NSSR charter, the H&SW built the 35 kilometres (22 mi) of track over the following months, with the first train reaching Caledonia on July 1, 1904.

In April 1905, the H&SW purchased the L&MR, with a short section of that line forming part of the main line between Bridgewater and Barrington. The new construction between Bridgewater and Barrington was completed later that year. In 1905, the H&SW also purchased the H&YR with major upgrades being done to this line between Barrington and Yarmouth over the next year.

Also in 1905, the H&SW purchased the charter for the incomplete Middleton and Victoria Beach Railway (M&VBR) in the western Annapolis Valley. The 64-kilometre (40 mi) M&VBR line was opened by the H&SW to connect an iron ore mine at Torbrook, near Middleton on the NSCR, with port facilities at Port Wade on Annapolis Basin.

== Canadian Northern ==
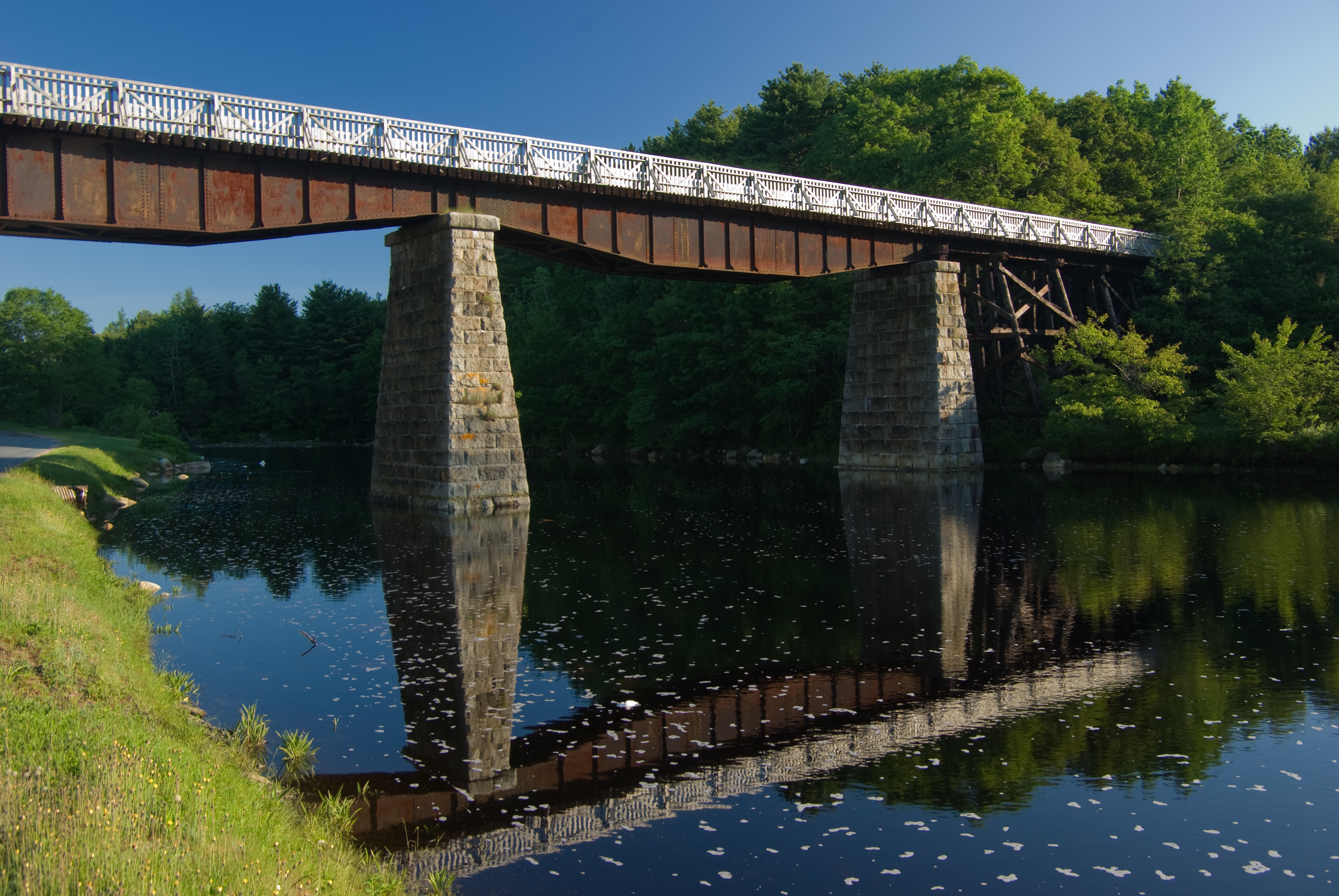
Rail crossing at Martins River. The bridge is now part of the Trans Canada Trail.

Construction was completed in 1906 and H&SW tracks joined the Intercolonial Railway's mainline in Halifax at Southwestern Junction at Africville and ran into the Intercolonial's North Street Station. On December 19, 1906, the first H&SW through train reached Yarmouth from Halifax. At some point after the completion of the H&SW in 1906, the system was merged into Mackenze and Mann's Canadian Northern Railway (CNoR) transcontinental system. The H&SW, along with the Inverness Railway, were isolated from the rest of CNoR's trackage which ran from Montreal to Vancouver, not unlike rival Canadian Pacific Railway's Dominion Atlantic Railway.

The CNoR, along with several other railway lines in Canada, entered financial difficulties during the First World War. Encumbered by construction debts and low traffic, the CNoR was bankrupt and requested financial aid from the federal government in 1918. On September 6, 1918, CNoR was nationalized and placed under a Board of Management by the Department of Railways and Canals. On December 20, 1918, CNoR, along with the Canadian Government Railways were placed under a new company named Canadian National Railways (CNR).

== Canadian National ==
Under the CNR, the H&SW trackage saw significant infrastructure improvements to ballast, drainage, sleeper ties, rails, switches and bridges. The line still had significant curvature throughout, a result of the rugged local topography on the South Shore (locals called the H&SW the "Hellish Slow & Wobbly"), but the improvements brought respectable track speeds and service improvements.

The Intercolonial Railway / Canadian Government Railways Halifax terminal trackage inherited by the CNR underwent significant change in the late 1910s with the construction and opening of a new south-end terminal and station in 1920. The project excavated a massive railway cut across the isthmus of the Halifax Peninsula, which affected the H&SW tracks that connected with the ICR mainline near Africville. In 1921, the Halifax end of the H&SW was shifted to join the new alignment in the rock cut by constructing what became known as "Southwestern Junction" in the community of Fairview, adjacent to a large new roundhouse complex.

In the years before the domination of publicly funded highways, the H&SW formed a critical transportation link between the various communities, as well as steam ship connections at Yarmouth (to Boston and New York) and Halifax (to Europe).

In the 1920s, the former M&VBR line was proving uneconomic after the closure of iron ore mines at Torbrook and the port at Port Wade. The CNR applied in 1925 to abandon west of Middleton, but permission was given to abandon only west of Bridgetown. By 1928, bridges were removed, and trackage was removed in the following years.

The construction of the large Bowater Mersey Paper Company Limited mill at Brooklyn in 1929 led to more traffic from the Liverpool area. Shipyards in Liverpool and Shelburne lent some traffic, as did various saw mills and logging operations at locations between Yarmouth and Halifax, between Bridgewater and Middleton/Bridgetown and between New Germany and Caledonia. The naval base HMCS Shelburne opened on Shelburne Harbour during the Second World War, requiring construction of a 1.6-kilometre (1 mi) spur. Heating oil and gasoline distribution terminals operated by various oil companies in communities along the lines. A distillery in Bridgetown generated some traffic, as did a forest products plant in East River. In 1971 a large Michelin tire factory opened in Bridgewater and required rail service. The development of the Lakeside Industrial Park near the Beechville area in the 1960s create several large industrial customers. One of them, a Volvo assembly plant, attracted steady strings of autorack cars until it closed in 1998.

== Decline ==
CN passenger service ended on the South Shore on Saturday October 25, 1969, and its stations fell into disuse. The historic H&SW passenger station in Bridgewater was destroyed by an unexplained fire on December 22, 1982.

CN's former H&SW lines on Nova Scotia's South Shore and in the Annapolis Valley were proving uneconomic by the early 1980s, even for freight service. In 1982, permission was given to abandon the far end of the mainline from Liverpool to Yarmouth as well as the branch line of the former NSCR line between Bridgewater and Bridgetown via Middleton, as well as the New Germany to Caledonia. Reduced to a line running from Halifax to Liverpool, CN depended on the Bowater paper mill and the Michelin tire plant, but even these customers were unable to keep the line generating positive income.

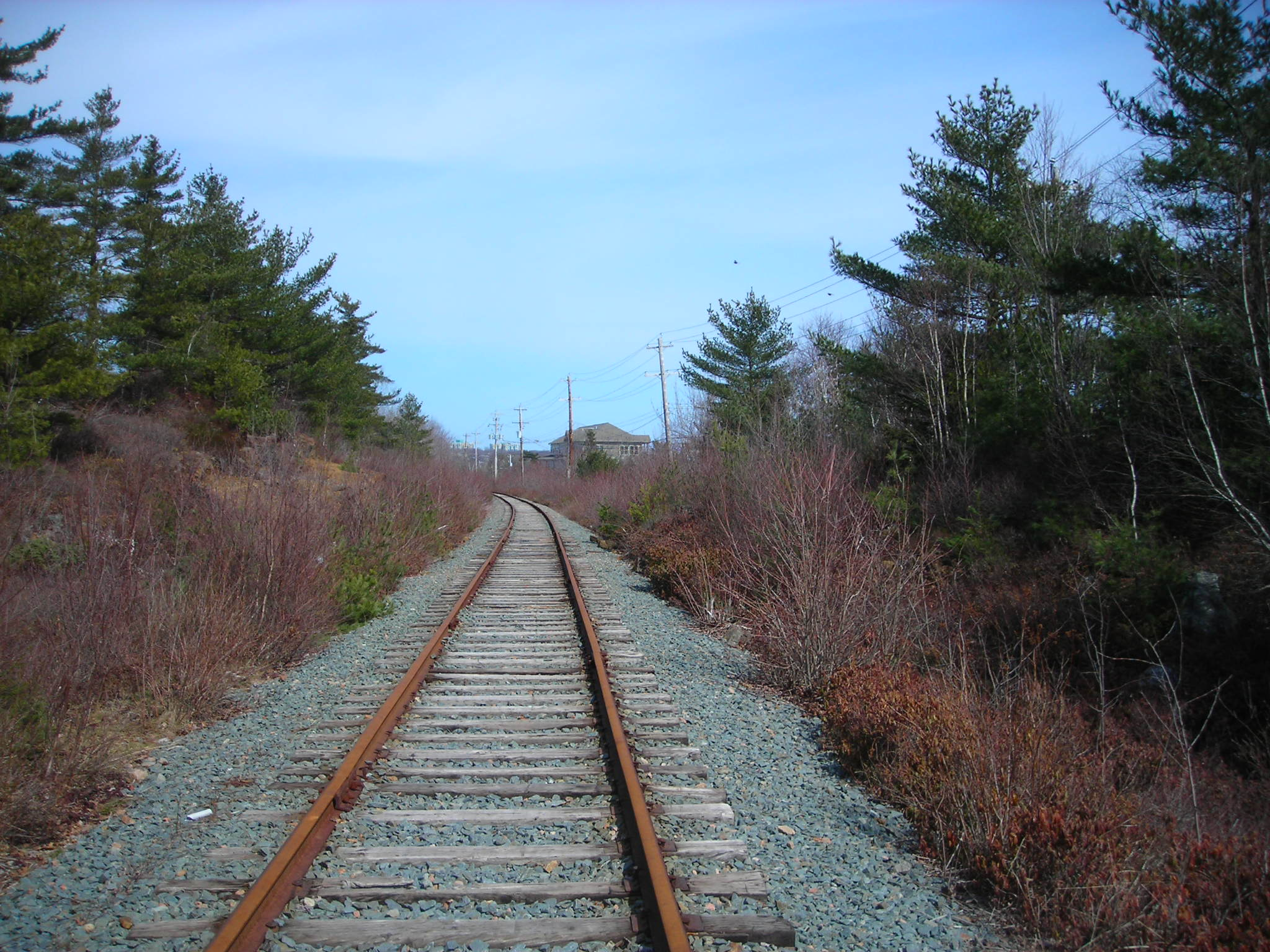
Unused tracks of the H&SW in West Halifax, 2010. The track bed is now a multiuse trail.

By the late 1980s, CN was given permission to abandon the remaining line from Bridgewater to Liverpool as the Bowater pulp mill in Liverpool shifted its transportation to ocean shipping and trucks. At Bridgewater, CN built a small yard on the east side of the Lahave River and sold its extensive former yard property to a shopping mall developer. In the early 1990s, even that trackage was eliminated, as Michelin began to use trucks to service its plant and CN's last remaining customer in Lunenburg County was the forest products company at East River.

In 1993 the former H&SW trackage was abandoned west of Halifax's Lakeside Industrial Park, leaving only a 11-kilometre (7 mi) spur as the last reminder of this once important railway network in southern Nova Scotia. Called the Chester Spur in its employee timetable, CN freight operations to the Bayers Lake Industrial Park and Lakeside Industrial Park were focused on serving a cement depot, a scrap dealer and several other customers through a team track. In 2006, as part of its "Three-Year Rail Network Plan", CN declared its intention to discontinue service on the Chester Spur, this being the last remaining portion of the original H&SW trackage. The last freight trains operated on the spur west of Southwestern Junction through to the Lakeside Industrial Park in late 2007. The rail corridor was purchased by the Halifax Regional Municipality and by October 2009, rails at level crossings were lifted and paved over and by September 2010, all the remaining track of the CN Chester Spur had been removed and replaced by a rail trail (paved recreational pathway).

== Preservation ==
The railway's history is preserved at the Halifax and Southwestern Railway Museum in Lunenburg, Nova Scotia. In addition to the network of recreational trails built on the former H&SW roadbed, several stations have survived and been given alternative use. They include the French Village station, which is now a cafe and the Liverpool station which is the Hank Snow museum. The Chester stn. exists today as a tourist bureau, Oak Island museum and art gallery, and farmer's market.
