= John D. McKenzie =

Canadian politician

John Douglas McKenzie

MLA for Annapolis
- In office 1933–1945
- Preceded by: Harry Thompson MacKenzie; Obediah Parker Goucher
- Succeeded by: Henry Hicks

Personal details
- Born: December 1, 1889 Gilby, North Dakota, United States
- Died: April 28, 1952 (aged 62) Barbados
- Party: Liberal

John Douglas McKenzie (December 1, 1889 – April 28, 1952) was an American-born businessman and political figure in Nova Scotia, Canada. He represented the riding of Annapolis in the Nova Scotia House of Assembly from 1933 to 1945 as a Liberal member.

He was born in Gilby, North Dakota, the son of Alexander McKenzie and Isabella Douglas. McKenzie came to Canada in 1892 with his family and moved to Nova Scotia in 1914. In 1916, he married Sadie Walker. He was manager of a creamery in LaHave and opened his own creamery in Middleton in 1923. McKenzie was mayor of Middleton. He served on the province's Executive Council as Minister of Highways and Public Works from 1941 to 1945. He died in Barbados at the age of 62.
