= Angus Morrison Gidney =

Angus Morrison Gidney may refer to:

- Angus Morrison Gidney (writer) (1803–1882), Canadian educator, poet and journalist
- Angus Morrison Gidney (politician) (1849–1926, farmer and political figure in Nova Scotia, Canada
