= Caleb Shaffner =

Canadian politician

Member of the Nova Scotia House of Assembly for Annapolis
- In office 1878 – 1882
- Preceded by: Avard Longley
- Succeeded by: James Wilberforce Longley

Personal details
- Born: February 1, 1846 Nicteaux, Annapolis County, Nova Scotia
- Died: December 28, 1904 (aged 58) Truro, Nova Scotia
- Party: Conservative Party of Nova Scotia
- Spouse: Annie Wood (m. 1871)
- Education: Acadia College
- Occupation: Travelling salesman, politician, militia lieutenant-colonel

Caleb Willoughby Shaffner (February 1, 1846 – December 28, 1904) was a travelling salesman and political figure in Nova Scotia, Canada. He represented Annapolis County in the Nova Scotia House of Assembly from 1878 to 1882 as a Conservative member.

He was born in Nicteaux, Annapolis County, Nova Scotia, of German descent, and was educated at Acadia College. In 1871, he married Annie Wood. He was a lieutenant-colonel in the local militia. Shaffner lived in Wilmot, Nova Scotia. He died in Truro at the age of 87.
