= Middleton and Victoria Beach Railway =

Defunct Canadian railway

Map

The Middleton and Victoria Beach Railway was a historic Canadian railway which ran from Middleton to Port Wade in Annapolis County, Nova Scotia, Canada. It was purchased and completed by the Halifax and Southwestern Railway in 1906. A portion of the line remained in operation until 1983.

== Route ==
The line's eastern terminus was in Middleton, where it connected with the Dominion Atlantic Railway running between Halifax and Yarmouth, and also with the Nova Scotia Central Railway running from Middleton south to Bridgewater and Lunenburg. Running westward from Middleton, the Middleton and Victoria Beach line never actually ran as far as Victoria Beach, but made its western terminus in Port Wade where a quarter-mile wharf was built for loading and unloading of freight. This continued to be used even after the railway stopped running.

The line of the railway ran along the north side of the Annapolis River closer to the North Mountain and the farms there than was the Dominion Atlantic line. The two railways more or less parallelled each other between Middleton and Bridgetown. West of Bridgetown the Dominion Atlantic crossed a bridge to the south side of the Annapolis River while the Middleton and Victoria Beach line continued along the northern side of the river from Bridgetown west to Port Wade.

== Incorporation ==
The earliest variant of the company was the Granville and Victoria Beach Railway Company. The incorporators (those listed as the first members of the company) included forestry operators, merchants and lawyers from along the proposed route. This was a common way to get political support for the necessary legislative charter each railway had to have in order to qualify for the provincial construction grant, to allow it to expropriate its right of way (which it actually owned) and to permit it to cross highways. This railway was intended to run west from Bridgetown rather than from Middleton.

A second attempt to get the railway started was the Granville and Victoria Beach Railway and Development Company. The incorporation was extended in 1899. The 1897 Act had provided that the Act would cease if work had not been completed within two years. Then there was another extension in 1901, when the name of the company was changed to the Middleton and Victoria Beach Railway Company. At this time the eastern end of the railway was shifted east from Bridgetown to Middleton, possibly because the promoters were afraid to trust their only rail connection to the outside world to the Dominion Atlantic, but also because the railway to Bridgewater had been completed. At about this time the railway plans were approved and filed in the registry of deeds, which constituted the expropriation. The municipalities along the way, the Municipality of the County of Annapolis and the Town of Bridgetown, obtained legislative sanction to pay for the railway right of way, what was then referred to as railway damages. That was their contribution to what was generally seen as a valuable economic engine.

== Purchase and Completion ==
The railway was acquired by the Halifax and South Western Railway in 1905. The construction had not been completed, and the H&SW had to finish the job. MacKenzie and Mann, who were expanding the Canadian Northern in Nova Scotia, owned the H&SW, which had acquired the Nova Scotia Central and built a railway into Halifax from Bridgewater. The provincial government fixed the length of the line at forty miles (64 kilometers) for purposes of the subsidy.

== Operation ==
The railway eventually became part of Canadian Government Railways, and then Canadian National Railways. The railway was used for various agricultural and forest products, but its most important through cargo was iron from the mines at Torbrook, which was shipped from the Port Wade wharf.

== Abandonment ==
About 1928 traffic stopped west of Bridgetown and a wye west of Bridgetown station allowed trains to turn to go back to Middleton or Bridgewater. The line from Middleton to Bridgetown was abandoned in 1983.
