= Frank Chipman =

Canadian politician

MLA for Annapolis
- In office 1999–2003
- Preceded by: Laurie Montgomery
- Succeeded by: Stephen McNeil

Personal details
- Born: January 31, 1947 (age 79) Middleton, Nova Scotia
- Party: Progressive Conservative
- Occupation: farmer

Frank Chipman (born January 31, 1947) is a Canadian politician. He represented the electoral district of Annapolis in the Nova Scotia House of Assembly from 1999 to 2003. He was a member of the Progressive Conservatives.

== Early life and education ==
Born in 1947 in Middleton, Nova Scotia, Chipman is a graduate of the Ontario Police College. He served three years with the Ontario Provincial Police before returning to Nova Scotia in 1972 to operate a farm in the Annapolis Valley community of Nictaux West.

== Political career ==
In 1997, Chipman was elected a municipal councillor for Annapolis County. Chipman entered provincial politics in the 1999 election, defeating Liberal Stephen McNeil by 761 votes in the Annapolis riding. He was defeated by McNeil when he ran for re-election in 2003.

In 2008, Chipman returned to politics when he was elected a municipal councillor in Annapolis County. He was re-elected by acclamation in 2012. Chipman was defeated when he ran for re-election in 2016.
