= Orlando Daniels =

Canadian politician

Orlando Tilestone Daniels (March 20, 1860 – May 21, 1927) was a lawyer and political figure in Nova Scotia, Canada. He represented Annapolis County in the Nova Scotia House of Assembly as a Liberal from 1906 to 1925.

== Early life ==
He was born in Lawrencetown, Annapolis County, Nova Scotia, the son of Wellington Daniels, a farmer, and Lavinia Margeson. He was educated in Lawrencetown and at Acadia University. Daniels went on to study law with James Wilberforce Longley in Halifax, was called to the Nova Scotia bar in 1885 and set up practice in Bridgetown. In 1893, he married Mary Muir. Daniels was Attorney General in the province's Executive Council from 1911 to 1922. He died in Bridgetown, Nova Scotia.
