= Middleton Regional High School =

Coordinates: 44.942328°N 65.071292°W

Location
- 18 Gates Avenue; Middleton, Nova Scotia; Canada

Information
- School type: High School
- Motto: Virtus Veritas
- Established: 1948
- Principal: Mr Leblanc
- Grades: 6 - 12
- Enrollment: 700
- Colours: Blue and gold
- Mascot: Monarch
- Website: www.middleton.ednet.ns.ca

Middleton Regional High School (MRHS) is located in Middleton, Annapolis County, Nova Scotia, Canada. It was founded in 1948 and includes grades 6 - 12. Current and new principal is Chad LeBlanc.

MRHS was the first rural high school in Nova Scotia, and was designed by the architect Douglas A. Webber.

The school serves the communities of Middleton, Nictaux, Lawrencetown, Torbrook, Wilmot, Spa Springs, and Margaretsville.

== Sports ==
MRHS has the following sport teams:

- Basketball
- Badminton
- Hockey
- Volleyball
- Softball
- Soccer
- Track and field
- Girls' rugby

Since 2010 the teams have been called the Monarchs.

The MRHS Monarchs senior girls' basketball team won four consecutive provincial championships, from 2012 to 2016.

== Notable alumni ==
- Merck Mercuriadis, music industry executive
- Amanda Peters, author

== See also ==
- List of schools in Nova Scotia
