= Vinylon =

Synthetic fiber

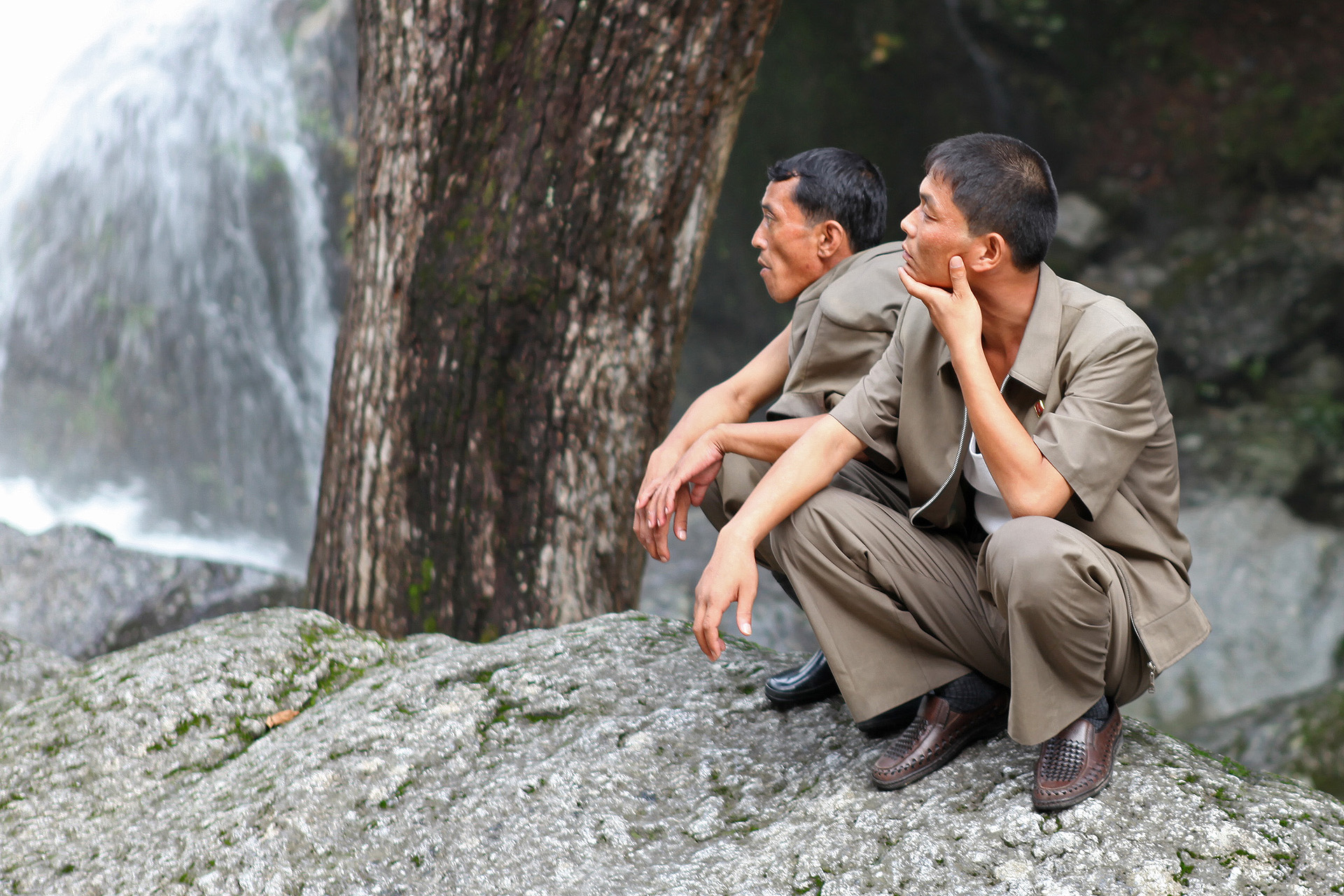
North Korean men wearing uniforms made from vinylon

Vinylon, also known as Vinalon (more common in Korean sources), is a synthetic fiber produced from reaction between polyvinyl alcohol (PVA) fiber and formaldehyde. Chemically it is polyvinyl formal (PVF). Vinylon was first developed in Japan in 1939 by Ichiro Sakurada, Ri Sung-gi, and H. Kawakami. In North Korea, Ri Sung-gi found a route to produce PVA from domestic anthracite (black coal) and limestone as raw materials. Trial production began in 1954 and in 1961 the massive "Vinylon City" was built in Hamhung, North Korea. Vinylon's widespread usage in North Korea is often pointed to as an example of the implementation of the Juche philosophy, and it is known as the Juche fiber.

PVF, in fiber form, is a useful thermoplastic resin on its own, most commonly used as electric wire insulation.

== Applications ==
Vinylon is the national fiber of North Korea and is used for the majority of textiles, outstripping fiber such as cotton or nylon, which is produced only in small amounts in North Korea. Other than clothing, vinylon is also used for shoes, ropes, and quilt wadding.

Japanese-Canadian textile artist Toshiko MacAdam used vinylon in her early works, as it was more economical than nylon.

Swedish outdoor brand Fjällräven makes their popular Kånken backpack line out of a version of vinylon, branded Vinylon F.

== Properties ==
Vinylon is resistant to heat and chemicals but has several disadvantages: being stiff, having a relatively high manufacturing cost, and being difficult to dye.

== Production ==
Synthesis of vinylon, final step

The production process by Ri is as follows:

- Limestone and coal are mixed to produce calcium carbide.
- The carbide is used to produce acetylene gas.
- Reaction with acetic acid produces vinyl acetate.
- Polymerization produces polyvinyl acetate (PVAc).
- Hydrolysis of PVAc produces polyvinyl alcohol (PVOH). For optimal fiber spinning, industrial-grade PVOH typically requires a high degree of hydrolysis (often exceeding 98%) to ensure proper crystalline structure and thermal stability.
- PVOH is stretched into a fiber and spun.
- The PVOH yarn is finally reacted with formaldehyde to make vinylon, a chain of acetals and hemiacetals.

Other locations may use alternative feedstocks to synthesize PVOH.

== History ==
=== 1939: colonial introduction ===
Between the years 1910 to 1945, Korea was ruled as a Japanese colony. This fact forced the integration of Korea into the Japanese empire's economic and political spheres. Thus, after the Second Sino-Japanese War began in 1937, Korea was integrated into the Japanese war effort. It was amid Japan's efforts towards creating a more scientific and technologically advanced country for the war when a team of researchers worked to fabricate Vinylon.

The first successful creation of Vinylon was in 1939, by a Kyoto University research team in Japan, using petroleum as the feedstock.

However, Vinylon was later brought to North Korea by Ri Sung-gi, one of the researchers of the Kyoto University team, amid North Korean campaign aimed at the recruitment of scientists and engineers from South Korea in the period following Korea's liberation from Japan in 1945. He was working as a professor at Seoul National University at the time. During the Korean War, when Seoul was occupied by the Korean People's Army, Ri was offered a research position in North Korea, which he accepted. He found a way to produce Vinylon from coal.

=== 1961: Vinylon City, Hungnam ===
After the liberation of Korea in 1945, North Korea was under Soviet occupation and thus provided with aid by the Soviets as a means to stabilize the country. Beginning at the end of the Korean War in 1953, the Soviet Union, China, and other communist countries began actively providing foreign aid to North Korea. Therefore, the North Korean economy heavily depended on aid from other socialist countries.

However, in the 1960s, the aid from the Soviet Union decreased. North Korea was no longer receiving aid in the form of grants, but loans. Hence, the North Korean leadership decided to accelerate efforts towards developing a self-sufficient economy. This resulted in the full mobilization of domestic resources. Beginning in 1961, North Korea launched its First Seven-Year Economic Development Plan, which focused on technological innovations, cultural revolution, improvement of living standards, modernization of the economy, and the facilitation of trade and international economic cooperation. As a result, the North Korean government decided to develop the vinylon industry and build the February 8 Vinylon Complex, nicknamed Vinylon City.

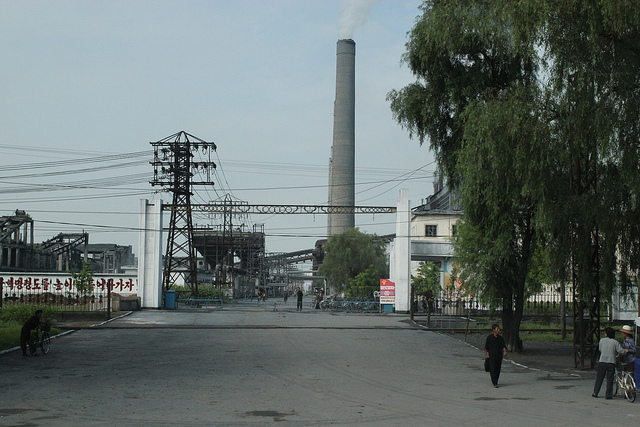
Entrance of the February 8 Vinylon Factory Complex in Hungnam, North Korea

In the early stages of North Korea's history, the government under Kim Il Sung and the official "Juche" (self-reliance) ideology promoted the idea that the only way to reach the goal of economic independence was through heavy machine industry. The manufacturing of vinylon was therefore taken as a step towards developing North Korea as a modern industrial state. With such an appeal to nationalism, the North Korean government mobilized its citizens for constructing and supporting a new vinylon factory, called Vinylon City.

In 1961, Vinylon City, the factory compound for producing vinylon, was built in the northeastern industrial city of Hungnam. The construction of the factory (which has fifty buildings) took fourteen months. Vinylon City had a total floor space of 130,000 m^{2} (1,400,000 sq ft), 15,000 production machines, 1,700 container tanks, and 500 km (310 mi) of piping. The tallest building in Vinylon City, measuring 32 m (105 ft) in height with a 40 m (130 ft) smokestack, was the acetic acid shop. The spinning shop, which was responsible of creating the vinylon fiber and shipping, was the largest building—160 m (520 ft) long and 117 m (384 ft) wide, with 35,000 m^{2} (380,000 sq ft) floor space.

Vinylon City became the pride of North Korea, being touted as having been built without foreign assistance. The success of Vinylon City demonstrated independence from the Soviet Union and China and appeared to reflect the Juche ideology. Even though workers had to complete dangerous tasks and some ultimately lost their lives for the sake of demonstrating the country's capabilities, vinylon thus served as a reinforcement of the party's ideological command and the Kim family's rule.

The city began with a goal of producing enough fiber to supply the entire country with clothing, shoes, and other necessities, a goal that appears to have been met for several decades. The fiber produced from Vinylon City was considered so important that during the annual commemoration of Kim Il-sung's birthday, the people were given gifts of vinylon clothing. The factory is said to have hit a production ceiling in 1973. A second complex was planned in 1983 but never built.

=== 1990s–2000s ===
The North Korean economy suffered enormously after the collapse of the Soviet Union, culminating in the North Korean famine of 1994-1998. The complex closed in 1994 due to coal shortage and fell into disrepair as residents stole equipment to trade for necessities. During this time vinalon was displaced by other fabrics, some made domestically, others imported from China. One defector said that only the army continued to purchase the material despite its high water absorption and burn risks, which make it ill-suited for combat.

=== 2010 reopening ===
On February 8, 2010, Kim Jong Il visited the former Vinylon City complex in Hamhung to celebrate its reopening. Kim was accompanied by high-ranking officers of the party, such as SPA Presidium Chairman Kim Yong-nam, Defense Minister Kim Yong-chun and Korean Workers Party secretaries Kim Ki-nam and Choi Tae-bok. This was the first documented time he ever attended an industrial mass rally. While his attendance, and that of the most important party members, could signify the importance of the vinylon complex and its role in advancing the economic policies of Kim Jong Il, there is evidence that the facility could play a role in the North Korean nuclear weapons program. Based on an analysis of satellite imagery, information from Ko Chong-song (a North Korean official who had defected), and a number of North Korean technical documents, there is speculation that the Hamhung plant is manufacturing unsymmetrical dimethylhydrazine, a rocket fuel that is used in North Korean long-range missiles.

In his new-year speech for 2017, Kim Jong Un expressed plans to revamp the Vinylon City.

== Historical significance ==
Although vinylon was initially used to help develop the North Korean economy as a home-grown product, it also became intertwined with nationalism. As a result, vinylon became a firm part of the North Korean national identity.
