= Henry Hicks (Nova Scotia politician) =

Canadian politician

The Honourable Henry Davies Hicks CC, QC

16th Premier of Nova Scotia
- In office September 30, 1954 – November 20, 1956
- Monarch: Elizabeth II
- Lieutenant Governor: Alistair Fraser
- Preceded by: Harold Connolly
- Succeeded by: Robert Stanfield

Senator for The Annapolis Valley, Nova Scotia
- In office April 27, 1972 – March 5, 1990
- Appointed by: Pierre Trudeau

MLA for Annapolis
- In office October 23, 1945 – June 7, 1960
- Preceded by: John D. McKenzie
- Succeeded by: district dissolved

Personal details
- Born: March 5, 1915 Bridgetown, Nova Scotia
- Died: December 9, 1990 (aged 75) St. Croix, Nova Scotia
- Party: Liberal
- Spouse(s): Pauline Banks; Gene Morrison; Rosalie Comeau
- Occupation: lawyer, university administrator

Henry Davies Hicks CC QC (March 5, 1915 – December 9, 1990) was a lawyer, university administrator, and politician in Nova Scotia.

== Early life and education ==
Born in Bridgetown, Nova Scotia, the son of Henry Hicks and Annie Kinney, Hicks was educated in Bridgetown and at Mount Allison University, Dalhousie University and Oxford University, where he was a Rhodes scholar. He was admitted to the Nova Scotia bar in 1941. During World War II, he served as a captain in the Royal Canadian Artillery.

== Political career ==
Hicks was elected to the Nova Scotia House of Assembly in 1945 as a Liberal for Annapolis County and served as Nova Scotia's first minister of education from 1949 to 1954 in the government of Angus Lewis Macdonald. When Macdonald died, Hicks ran for the Liberal party leadership against interim leader and then Premier Harold Connolly. The party was badly split along religious lines, with Protestants uniting behind Hicks to defeat Connolly, who was a Roman Catholic. As the new premier, Hicks was unable to unite the party and his government was defeated in the 1956 election by Robert Stanfield's Progressive Conservatives.

Hicks resigned as Leader of the opposition in 1960 and took the post of dean of arts and science at Dalhousie University. He later became a vice president of the school and then president in 1963. He served as president until August 31, 1980 and is recognized as transforming Dalhousie University from a tiny "College By the Sea" into a leading national research university.

During Hicks' tenure, the campus underwent a complete transformation as new facilities were built, expanded, or acquired for all areas of the university from academics and research to arts and athletics, as well as student housing. In September 2002, the Henry Hicks Academic Administration Building was named after him.

In 1970, Hicks was made a Companion of the Order of Canada. On April 27, 1972, he was appointed to the Senate of Canada by Pierre Trudeau, and served in that capacity until his retirement on March 5, 1990. As a keen woodworker, Hicks conducted amateur repairs on the Black Rod of the Senate after it had snapped in half in 1967.

== Personal life and death ==
In 1945, Hicks married Pauline Banks (d. February 22, 1964). They had four children; Catherine, Henry, John, and Francess. In 1965, he married Gene Morrison (d. January 1988). In 1988, he married Rosalie Comeau (d. December 9, 1990).

On the afternoon of December 9, 1990, Hicks and his wife Rosalie were returning to Halifax from the Annapolis Valley when their vehicle crossed the centre line and struck an oncoming car. Hicks and his wife were killed, along with two of the four passengers in the other vehicle.

The British TV presenter Richard Madeley is a distant relative of Hicks.

Political offices
Preceded by Harold Connolly	Premier of Nova Scotia; 1954 – 1956	Succeeded by Robert Stanfield
Academic offices
Preceded by Alexander Enoch Kerr	President of Dalhousie University; 1963 – 1980	Succeeded by William Andrew MacKay
