= Bridgetown, Nova Scotia =

Bridgetown
- Community
- Location of Bridgetown, Nova Scotia
- Coordinates: 44°50′29″N 65°17′22″W
- Country: Canada
- Province: Nova Scotia
- County: Annapolis County
- Founded: 1783
- Incorporated: September 15, 1897
- Dissolved: April 1, 2015
- Electoral Districts Federal: West Nova
- Provincial: Annapolis

Government
  - MLA: Carman Kerr (L)
  - MP: Chris d'Entremont (L)

Area
  - Land: 3.54 km^{2} (1.37 sq mi)
  - Urban: 3.65 km^{2} (1.41 sq mi)

Population (2021)
  - Community: 970
  - Density: 267/km^{2} (690/sq mi)
- Time zone: UTC-4 (AST)
- Postal code: B0S 1C0
- Area code: 902
- Telephone Exchange: 312, 588, 665
- Median Earnings*: $38,248
- Website: bridgetownnovascotia.com
- Median household income, 2005

Bridgetown is a Canadian community located in north-central Annapolis County, Nova Scotia.

== History ==
Situated on the Annapolis River at the head of the tide, the area saw Mi'kmaq settlements, followed by Acadian settlers from Port-Royal and then British-sponsored settlements by the late 18th century.

There were at least ten Acadian settlers in the Bridgetown area before the French census of 1671, and the population doubled by 1707. The main Acadian settlement was on the east boundary of the present town, called Gaudetville. There were other Acadian settlers in the town proper, some of whom lived just east of the present bridge.

Several armed skirmishes occurred in neighbouring Carleton Corner during Queen Anne's War (the Battle of Bloody Creek (1711)) and several decades later, the Seven Years' War (the Battle of Bloody Creek (1757)).

Deed references suggest British settlement in Bridgetown from the early 1760s onward, after the Acadians were expelled from Nova Scotia in 1755. These settlers appeared shortly after the allocation of Granville Township among its proprietors; Bridgetown is located in what was formerly Granville Township, settled from 1760 on. The central part of Bridgetown was referred to as the Farm of Henly for unknown reasons. The community grew into a successful wooden shipbuilding area during the 19th century, accounting for many grand homes. It was incorporated as a town in 1897. The town was actually an entrepot for the agricultural and forest products of the surrounding areas and became a significant manufacturing and commercial centre in the 19th century. Manufacturing included a furniture factory, an organ factory, a tannery, a bottling plant, a cider plant, the first M.W. Graves cannery and vinegar factory (Graves was a major food processor that later moved to Kings County) and a distillery.

The community is one of few in Nova Scotia to have developed from a formal town plan (or plat), rather than allowing development to proceed unhindered. Captain John Crosskill RN, who owned or controlled the central part of the community, what is now downtown, divided the bulk of the lands into 90 by 90 lots in 1821. and most of these boundaries remain visible to this day. As the community developed, the heirs of Captain Crosskill planned several additional subdivisions, some of which were wildly optimistic.

The community was named at a gathering of local residents about 1824. There are two versions of the rationale for the name. The more romantic has it that the community was named after Bridgetown, Barbados, because Captain Crosskill had once been stationed there, and had apparently much enjoyed it. The other simply attributes the name to the presence of a bridge over the Annapolis River. This version is given some credence because Joseph Howe, in his Rambles, refers to the area as "The Bridge". Likely there were proponents of both theories at the meeting, and since both sides wanted the name Bridgetown it will never be possible to sort out how many had which reason.

The Windsor and Annapolis Railway (W&A) constructed its mainline between Windsor and Annapolis Royal through the area in 1868, crossing over the Annapolis River on a bridge between the north and south banks in the community. The original W&A crossing was a wooden covered bridge that was replaced in 1881 by the present iron railway bridge. The W&A merged into the Dominion Atlantic Railway (DAR), a subsidiary of Canadian Pacific Railway, and operated until 1990. The Middleton and Victoria Beach Railway was constructed through the north end of Bridgetown in the early 20th century and this line came under the ownership of Canadian National Railway, operating until 1982.

Various small industries clustered around both rail lines. The DAR had a passenger station and small railway yard on the south bank of the river. A brick plant, soda pop factory, and various apple warehouses were built along the railway in this area. CN had a passenger station as well as a small yard on the north bank of the river, serving various apple warehouses and the Acadian Distillery factory. Most industries had closed by the 1980s and today, few remnants of the railways are visible, except for the former DAR station which was converted into a pub, formerly known as the “End of The Line Pub”. Under new ownership, it is now known as “The Station”.

In 1966, Bridgetown had a population of 1,060, of which 140 were African Nova Scotians. Black people have a long history in Bridgetown, residing primarily in the areas of Inglewood Road, "The Pasture" and "The Tracks".

=== Heritage buildings ===
The Morse-Magwood House was built in 1871 and is noted as a fine example of Second Empire architecture and is considered one of the most picturesque homes in the province. The Rothsay Masonic Temple was built in 1871 as a Presbyterian church, but purchased in 1925 by the Rothsay Lodge of the Masonic Order. It is a brick structure in the Gothic Revival style.

== Present day ==
Historical population
Year	Pop.	±%
1901	858	—
1911	996	+16.1%
1921	1,086	+9.0%
1931	1,126	+3.7%
1941	1,020	−9.4%
1951	1,038	+1.8%
1956	1,041	+0.3%
1961	1,043	+0.2%
1981	1,047	+0.4%
1986	1,118	+6.8%
1991	1,021	−8.7%
1996	994	−2.6%
2001	1,035	+4.1%
2006	972	−6.1%
2011	949	−2.4%
2016	949	+0.0%
2021	970	+2.2%

Like a lot of small communities, Bridgetown today concentrates on service industries. The largest employers are the P-12 school and Mountains and Meadows Care Group. Britex Limited was the last large manufacturing enterprise but closed in 2004.

Bridgetown is roughly equidistant between Middleton and Annapolis Royal, situated in the Annapolis County. Trunk 1 runs through the community on Granville Street. During the 1980s, Highway 101 was extended to Bridgetown, terminating at an interchange with Trunk 1. This highway was extended in the early 1990s through to Annapolis Royal, bypassing the community completely.

Today Bridgetown has many heritage buildings which are best appreciated by taking The Cyprus Walk self-guided walking tour, named after the largest ship built on the Annapolis River. The historic downtown fronting Queen Street underwent redevelopment and beautification during the 1980s as a result of federal grants.

The new P-12 Bridgetown Regional Community School (BRCS) opened in 2017, to replace the former high school (BRHS) and former elementary school (BRES), both located in the east end of the town. BRHS was demolished and the site became green space and athletic fields, integrated with the new school site southeast of the former BRHS. In 2019, the town also added a chimney and plaque to the plot in order house local chimney swifts. The BRCS building still remains.

In the summer, Bridgetown is home to the annual Annapolis River Festival, which features different river sports including kayaking. Bridgetown also hosts an annual Ciderfest festival to celebrate the apple harvest every fall. The mascot, "Andy Apple-head" is a popular character among children and participates in the Ciderfest parade.

Bridgetown is twinned with Bridgetown, Barbados.

== Demographics ==
In the 2021 Census of Population conducted by Statistics Canada, Bridgetown had a population of 970 living in 470 of its 514 total private dwellings, a change of 2.2% from its 2016 population of 949. With a land area of 3.63 km^{2} (1.40 sq mi), it had a population density of 267.2/km^{2} (692.1/sq mi) in 2021.

== Government ==
Bridgetown was incorporated as a town on September 15, 1897. The first mayor of the town was Harry Ruggles, elected by acclamation.

In 2011, the town council drew national headlines by resigning en masse over financial difficulties including a misappropriation of funds by a municipal employee who was later convicted. A subsequent provincial audit found that $113,195.96 had been misappropriated from the town over 5 years by one employee, and additional losses were incurred from related costs and record-keeping errors. The provincial government subsequently appointed an interim council consisting of a mayor and two councillors, which governed the town until municipal elections were held in October 2012.

In November 2012 a new council (mayor and four councillors) was sworn in, and the provincially appointed council ceased to hold office.

On March 31, 2014, the town council voted to give up the town's municipal charter effective April 1, 2015, dissolving the town into the larger Municipality of the County of Annapolis. The council cited ongoing financial pressures in the form of increased costs to provide services and pension obligations, as well as declining revenue from the town's property tax base.

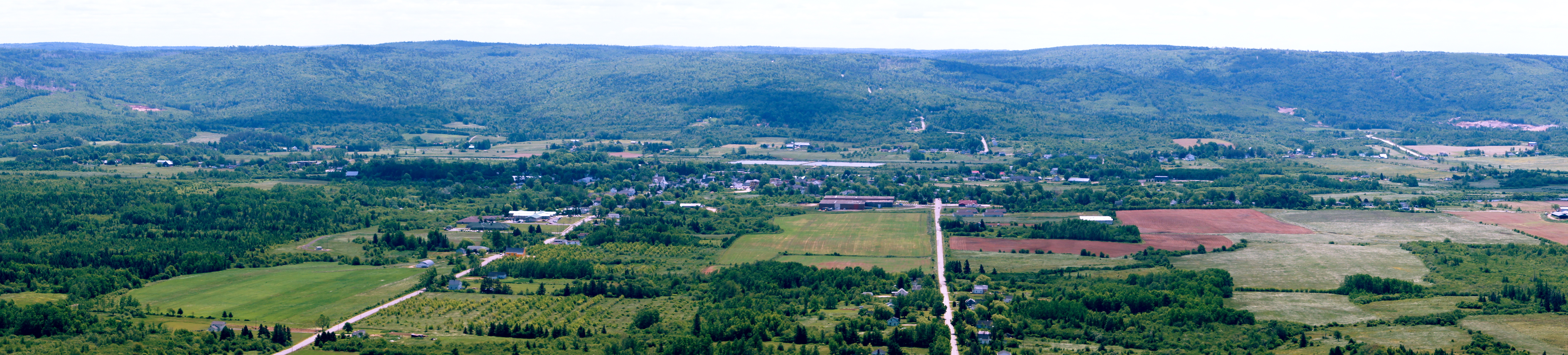
Bridgetown from Valleyview Provincial Park at the western end of the Annapolis Valley.

== Notable residents ==
- Toshiko MacAdam
- Henry Hicks
- Jared C. Troop
- Angus Morrison Gidney
- Stephen MacNeil
- Sophie Margaretta Almon Hensley
- Joseph Robert Coulter

== Twin towns – sister cities ==
Bridgetown is twinned with:

- Bridgetown, St Michael, Barbados (2004)
