= Sophie Hensley =

Sophie Margaretta Almon Hensley
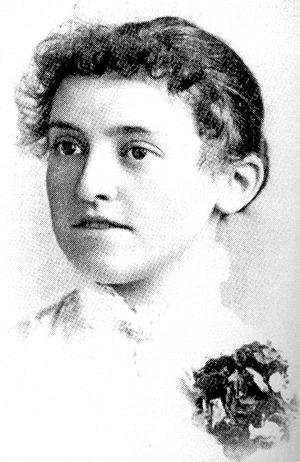
- Born: Sophie Margaretta Almon; May 31, 1866; Bridgetown, Nova Scotia
- Died: February 10, 1946 (aged 79); Windsor, Nova Scotia, Canada
- Spouse: Hubert Arthur Hensley
- Writing career
- Genre: poetry

Sophie Margaretta Almon Hensley (May 31, 1866 – February 10, 1946) was a Canadian writer and educator. She also published under the names Gordon Hart, J. Try-Davies and Almon Hensley.

== Biography ==
The daughter of Sarah Frances DeWolfe and Henry Pryor Almon, an Anglican minister, she was born Sophie Margaretta Almon in Bridgetown, Nova Scotia. She was first educated at home by her governesses and then continued her education in England and Paris. She returned to Windsor, Nova Scotia, where she was a protégée of Charles G. D. Roberts. She contributed to publications such as The Dominion illustrated monthly, The Current, The King's College Record. The Dalhousie Review and The Week. In 1889, she published her first poetry collection Poems. In the same year, she married Hubert Arthur Hensley, a barrister; the couple moved to New York City the following year. In 1895, she published her second collection of poems A Woman's Love Letters. She went on to write several other collections of poetry, a novelette and a musical play (with her husband). In 1913, she published Love and the Woman of Tomorrow, a feminist essay.

Hensley and her husband had two daughters and a son.

She lectured on literary topics. Hensley was also secretary of the New York State Assembly of Mothers, founder and vice-president of the New York City Mother's Club and founding president of the Society for the Study of Life. She was an associate editor of Health: A Home Magazine Devoted to Physical Culture and Hygiene and a member of the New York Press Club.

In 1937, she moved to Jersey but was forced to leave when the Germans occupied the Channel Islands in 1940 and she returned to Windsor, Nova Scotia.

She died of heart failure at the Annapolis General Hospital in Windsor at the age of 79.

== Selected publications ==
- A Woman's Love Letters (1895)
- The Heart of a Woman (1906)
