= Toshiko MacAdam =

Japanese Canadian fiber artist

Toshiko MacAdam nee Horiuchi (1940 - Apr 26, 2026) was a Japanese textile artist based in Bridgetown, Nova Scotia, Canada. She was best known for her work with large-scale textile structures, especially "textile playgrounds" for children, brightly colored net-like structures of crocheted and knotted nylon.

== Life and career ==
Toshiko Horiuchi MacAdam was a leading fibre artist in Canada and Japan, using knitting, crochet, and knot making techniques to create her work. Her later work focused on creating large, interactive textile environments.

MacAdam was born in Japan in 1940 but soon moved to Japanese-occupied Manchuria with her family during World War II. When the Soviet Union took over the area in 1945, MacAdam and her family were forced to flee and eventually returned to Japan. Later, MacAdam attended the Tama Fine Art Institute in Japan and went on to study in the Cranbrook Academy of Art in Michigan, where she received her masters of fine arts degree. After graduating, MacAdam worked for Boris Kroll Fabrics, an acclaimed textile design company in New York City. She then went on to teach at universities across the United States and Japan, including the Columbia University Teachers College, Haystack Mountain School of Crafts, the University of Georgia and the Kyoto Junior College of Art.

At the end of her career, MacAdam taught a textiles and fashion course entitled "Fiber Fabric Fashion" at NSCAD University in Halifax, Nova Scotia and ran Interplay Design and Manufacturing with her husband, Charles MacAdam, in Bridgetown, Nova Scotia.

== Work ==
=== Early work ===
MacAdam's work is often described as "fibre art" which became a widely accepted art form in the 1970s. "Fibre Columns/Romanesque Church" and "Atmosphere of the Floating Cube" are two early pieces by the artist that were influential in the fibre art movement, and were featured in books such as "The Art Fabric Mainstream" by Mildred Constantine and Jack Lenor Larsen. There they describe how "she knit hundreds of gold and silver lengths, stretched them into concave panels, and composed them as a cube. Then, with powerful knee-height floodlights, she transformed the whole into a haloed radiance." In these works, Horiuchi MacAdam established her affinity for working on a large scale, differentiating her from many other textile and fibre artists of the time.

=== Textile playgrounds ===
MacAdam is best known for her work with large-scale textile structures. She was inspired to create textile playground spaces for children after seeing children climbing in a three-dimensional textile sculpture that she was exhibiting. After this discovery, she began to observe the lack of parks and playground in Tokyo, where she was living at the time, and the negative effect that was having on children. In 1971, she created her first work intended for children, which was later donated to a Tokyo kindergarten designed by Hatsue Yamada. She exhibited her next piece at the National Museum of Modern Art in Kyoto.

In the early 1970s, MacAdam's work shifted from being simply fibre art, to interactive spaces as well as a leap from muted colours to a rainbow palette. This timeline corresponds with the birth of her son at the age of 44 and a move in 1988 to her husband Charles' native Nova Scotia, Canada.

In 1979, MacAdam collaborated with Fumiaki Takano, a landscape architect, to create another large-scale playspace for a new national park in Okinawa. She was then commissioned to create a similar for the Hakone Open-Air Museum in Kanagawa. These commissions allowed her to begin her work with nylon. The crocheted playground structures are assembled in sections by a team, and can literally use "tons" of nylon. The research that she undertook on public leisure spaces, mainly focused on Japan, has influenced her perspective on the role of playgrounds and parks in the development of children. Her structures are designed for children to have a space to take risks and explore in a safe environment. The spaces are intended to let children use their imagination.

In 1990, MacAdam established a business with her husband, Charles MacAdam, called Interplay Design and Manufacturing. The business operates out of Bridgetown, Nova Scotia, where the couple worked on commissioned projects.

MacAdams's textile playspaces are now installed in various locations worldwide, including projects in Spain, Singapore, Shanghai, New Zealand and Seoul.

=== Medium ===
To create her earlier works, MacAdam used a Japanese-developed material called Vinylon, a durable product but inferior to the nylon she has used in her later works which she crochets and dyes herself at her studio in Bridgetown, Nova Scotia.

MacAdam's playscape structures are almost entirely made by hand, with the addition of mechanically knotted elements in some pieces. Each work is original. She has cited the architecture of Antonio Gaudi and Iranian mosques as inspiration for her structural textile work.

=== Exhibitions ===
MacAdam exhibited textile work in museums and galleries in Asia, North America and Europe. Her exhibitions have been displayed in the Museum of Modern Art in New York City, New York, USA; the National Museum of Modern Art, Kyoto. Japan; the Palais des congrès de Paris, France; the Cleveland Museum of Art in Cleveland, Ohio; the Metropolitan Museum of Manila in Manila, Philippines; The Museum of Modern Art, Gunma, Japan; Galerie Alice Pauly in Lausanne, Switzerland; the Tokyo Metropolitan Art Museum in Tokyo, Japan; Honolulu Museum of Art Spalding House, Hawaii, USA; OliOli Children's Museum in Dubai UAE; and the Anna Leonowens Gallery at NSCAD University in Halifax, Nova Scotia, Canada. Her textile sculpture entitled "Atmosphere of the Floating Cube", owned by the Kyoto National Museum of Modern Art was included in a survey of modern influential textile artists from Japan at the Fukuoka Prefectural Museum of Art.

MacAdam also designed textiles commissioned for stage display. The Nonoichi City Culture Center's main hall displays a large curtain created by the artist called "Luminous".

In 2013, MacAdam, along with Charles MacAdam and structural designer Norihide Imagawa, installed another site-specific work titled Harmonic Motion for "Enel Contemporanea 2013" in the Museo d'Arte Contemporanea Roma in Rome, Italy. This recent work touches on the theme of how the human body interacts with space and materials, an idea that is present in much of her architectural work.

== Publications ==
MacAdam published several books, including from a line, a two-volume reference text on textile sculpture and Embroidery & Braiding: Japanese Craft, a book on embroidery techniques written jointly with Kayako Alkawa. In these books she did hundreds of illustrations demonstrating knitting, crochet, and knot making techniques she studied and learned from different cultures around the world. Her contributions are included in two European publications on public spaces for children, Design for Fun: Playgrounds and Great Kids Spaces. She wrote a series of articles called "Japanese Textiles Today", for Shenshoku no Bi Magazine, as well as contributing to other magazines in Japan and the United States.

=== Books ===
- from a line. Kyoto: Shenshoku to Seikatsu, 1986.
- Embroidery & Braiding: Japanese Craft, Volume 2, Kyoto: Tankosha, 1978 (with Kayoko Aikawa).
