= Fjällräven Kånken =

Backpack manufactured by Fjällräven

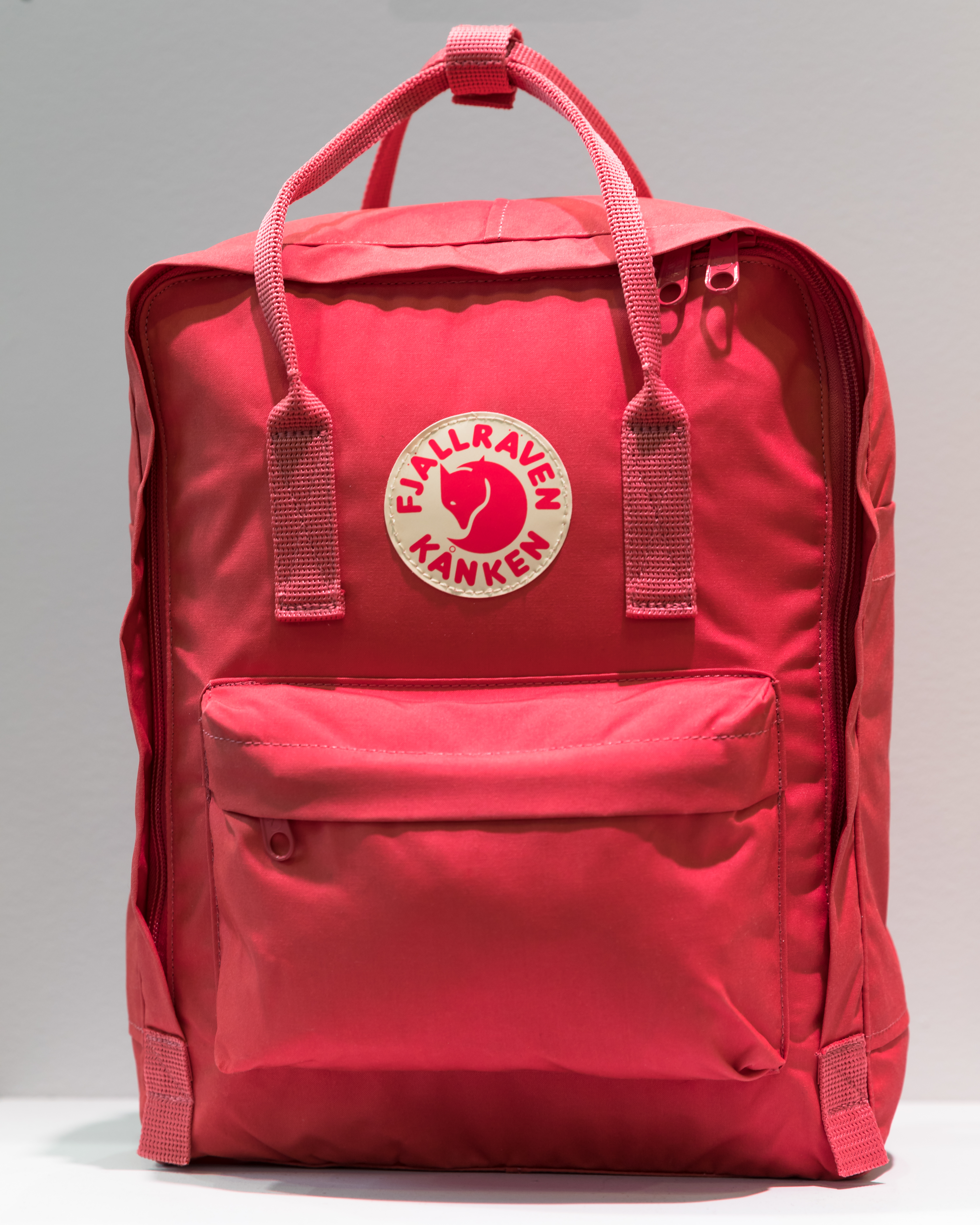
Red Fjällräven Kånken backpack

Kånken (from Swedish 'kånka', 'carry') is a backpack sold by the Swedish outdoor equipment company Fjällräven (Swedish for 'arctic fox'). It is Fjällräven's best-known and best-selling product.

== History ==
The Kånken backpack was introduced in 1978. It was developed by company founder Åke Nordin working with the Swedish scouting association, in response to reports that Swedish school children were developing back problems from wearing shoulder bags that were common at the time. It came to be sold in a large range of colours.

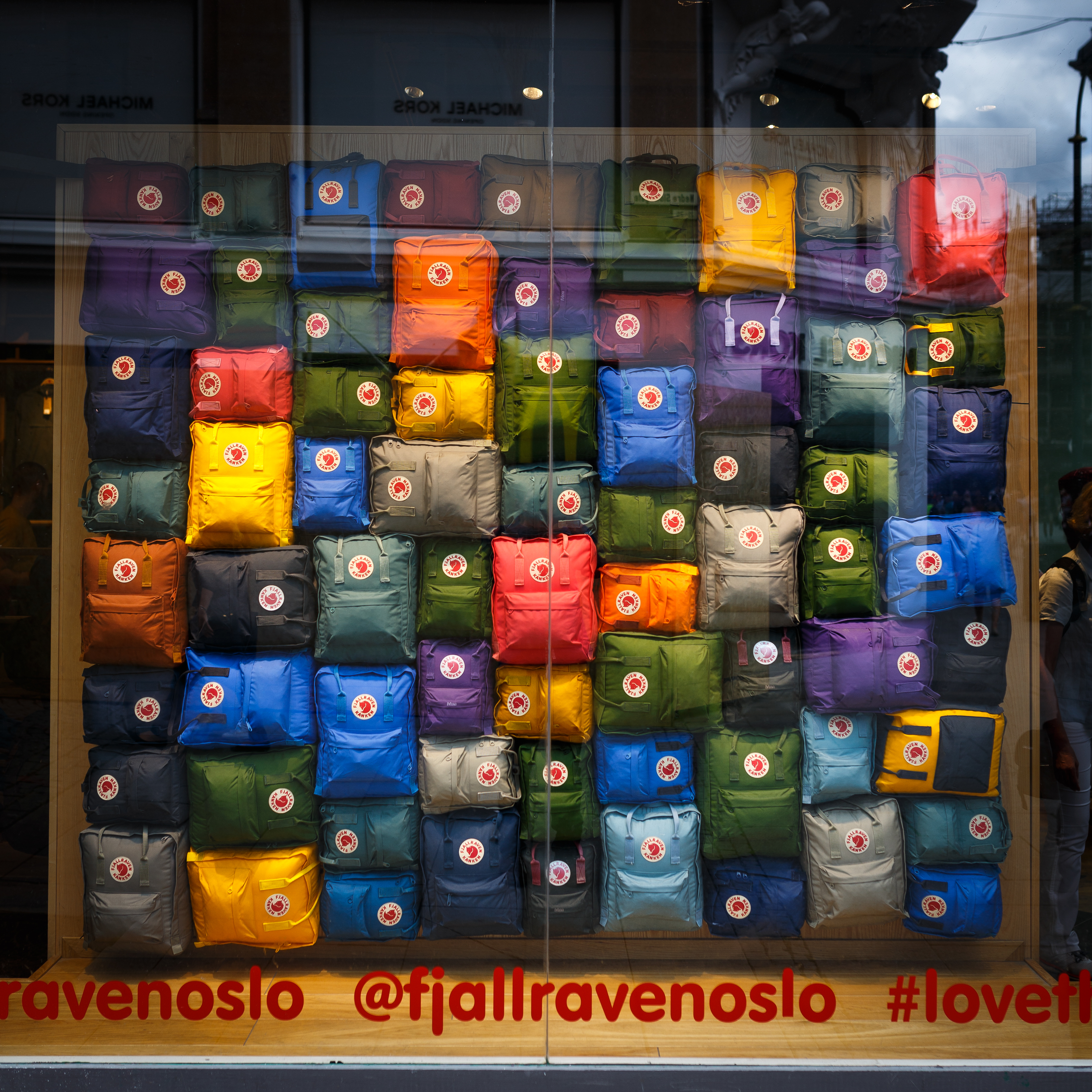
Kånken backpacks in a range of colours

During the 2010s, international Kånken sales greatly increased, with sales increasing tenfold from 2010 to 2017.

The standard Kånken backpack is made out of a version of vinylon plastic branded Vinylon F; Fjällräven has also released variants made of recycled plastic and other variants and accessories such as larger and smaller bags for laptops and padded straps. The Kånken received the Guldknappen Accessoar design prize in 2018.

Although a private sector product, its development has been described as an offshoot of the Nordic model of emphasising support for children, and marketed as hygge (a Danish word) in style.
