= Soldiers Memorial Hospital =

- Nova Scotia Health Authority
- Location in Nova Scotia

Geography
- Location: 462 Main Street, Middleton, Nova Scotia, Canada
- Coordinates: 44°56′49″N 65°03′33″W

Organization
- Care system: Public Medicare (Canada)
- Type: Primary Care

Services
- Beds: 113

History
- Founded: 1921

Links
- Lists: Hospitals in Canada

Soldiers Memorial Hospital is a full-service hospital in the town of Middleton, Nova Scotia.

== History ==
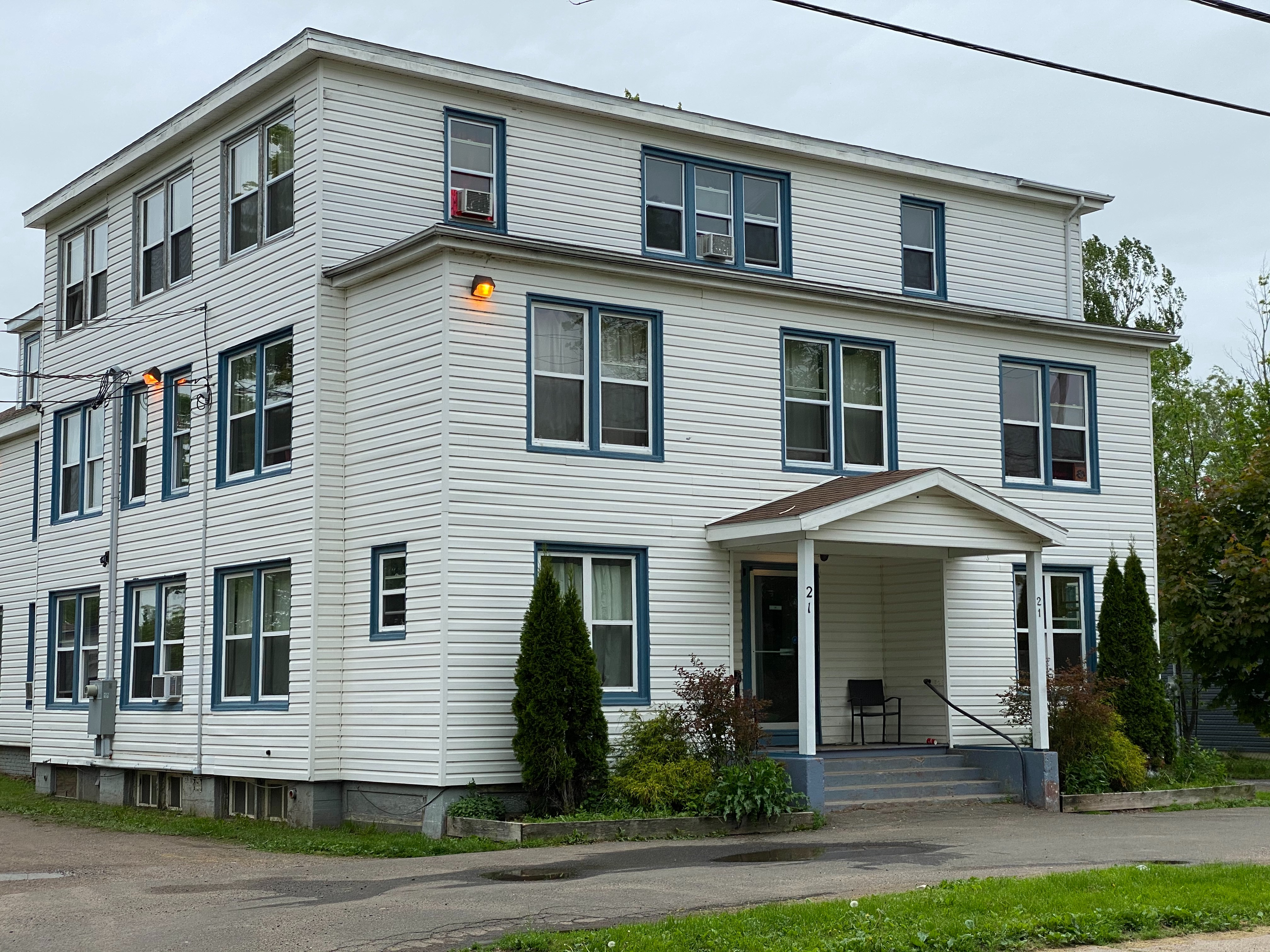
The original Soldiers Memorial Hospital, now an apartment building

The first hospital in Middleton was established in a house in Lower Middleton in 1916. In 1917, larger facilities were required so the J. D. Mackenzie property on Main Street was acquired. This new facility was operated by Mrs. A. J. Banks. In 1920, the hospital was relocated to 22 Bridge Street and was operated by Miss Jessie Woodbury, R. N., of Kingston, Nova Scotia.

It was soon realized that this hospital would be too small to provide the services needed and a movement was started by Dr. J. A. Sponagle, of Middleton, Nova Scotia, to secure larger and better facilities. Various groups were approached and, finally, the local War Veterans' Association consented to sponsor the new hospital. Dr. L. R. Morse of Lawrencetown was appointed Chairman of the project.

In 1921, the F. E. Cox residence on Commercial Street was purchased, moved to Gates Avenue, and converted into a hospital. The first Soldiers' Memorial Hospital became a corporate body under the laws of the province of Nova Scotia. The Hospitals' Board of Management was formed to direct the overall planning and operations of the hospital.

In 1946, the need for expansion was again experienced and it was decided to work towards the erection of a completely new and modern hospital. The present hospital site, at the east end of the town, was purchased in that year from Mrs. B. B. Gwillam. With the advent of a Provincial Hospitalization Program and the opportunity to receive Federal and Provincial Construction Grants, the construction of the new hospital began in 1960 and the hospital was officially opened in August 1961. The building was designed by the architect Douglas A. Webber.
