= Earle Rafuse =

Canadian politician

Earle Rayfuse

MLA for Annapolis
- In office 1993–1998
- Preceded by: new district
- Succeeded by: Laurie Montgomery

MLA for Annapolis East
- In office 1988–1993
- Preceded by: Gerry Sheehy
- Succeeded by: riding dissolved

Personal details
- Born: October 16, 1930 Middleton, Nova Scotia
- Died: January 17, 1998 (aged 67) Nictaux, Nova Scotia
- Party: Liberal
- Children: one daughter
- Occupation: wholesaler

Earle Albert Rayfuse (October 16, 1930 – January 17, 1998) was a Canadian politician. He represented the electoral districts of Annapolis East and Annapolis in the Nova Scotia House of Assembly from 1988 to 1998. He was a member of the Nova Scotia Liberal Party.

== Early life and career ==
Rayfuse was born in Middleton, Nova Scotia. He was a wholesale food distributor.

== Political career ==
Rayfuse entered provincial politics in the 1988 election, winning the Annapolis East riding. In the 1993 election, he ran in the new riding of Annapolis, and defeated Progressive Conservative cabinet minister Greg Kerr by over 3,600 votes.

== Death ==
He died at the age of 67 in 1998.
