= Joseph Robert Coulter =

Canadian football player (1913–2006)

Joseph Robert Coulter (1913–2006) was a Canadian football player, pilot, and educator.

Coulter played football at the University of Toronto (1933-1935), becoming team captain and winning the first Johnny Copp Trophy in 1935. He went on to play quarterback for the Toronto Argonauts in their 1936, 1940 & 1941 seasons.

Coulter earned an honours B.A. in English from the University of Toronto in 1935, his teachers' certificate a year later, and then taught English, History and Physical Education at North Toronto Collegiate Institute from 1936 to 1954.

During the Second World War (1942-1945) he enlisted as a pilot and became a Flying Officer earning his Pilot's wings.

From 1954-1958 Coulter taught English and French and was head of U of T's Extension Department responsible for the emerging field of adult education.

In 1958 Coulter was appointed Headmaster of St. Andrew's College in Aurora, Ontario where he served until his retirement in 1974. The college's Coulter Hall was named in his honour. In 1972 York University conferred an honorary Doctor of Letters upon Coulter.

He died July 12, 2006, in Bridgetown, Nova Scotia.
