= Laurie Montgomery =

Canadian politician (1936–2019)

MLA for Annapolis
- In office March 24, 1998 – June 18, 1999
- Preceded by: Earle Rafuse
- Succeeded by: Frank Chipman

Personal details
- Born: August 17, 1936 Weyburn, Saskatchewan
- Died: May 4, 2019 (82 years) Middleton, Nova Scotia
- Party: Liberal Party
- Spouse: Paula Montgomery (née Cameron) m.1965
- Children: Kenneth Montgomery, Carol McClintock (née Montgomery), Elizabeth Montgomery
- Occupation: Retired School Teacher

Laurence (Laurie) Edward Montgomery (August 17, 1936 – May 4, 2019) was a Canadian politician, who served as a Liberal Party Member of the Legislative Assembly in the Nova Scotia House of Assembly from 1998 to 1999, representing the electoral district of Annapolis.

== Political career ==
Montgomery entered provincial politics in the 1998 provincial election, defeating his Progressive Conservative opponent by 250 votes. Montgomery did not run again in the 1999 provincial election. Montgomery died on May 4, 2019, in Middleton, Nova Scotia Flags of the Provincial House were flown at half-mast on May 8, 2019, in honour of the former MLA.

== Electoral record ==
1998 Nova Scotia general election
Party	Candidate	Votes	%	±%
Liberal	Laurie Montgomery	3448	37.0	
Progressive Conservative	Basil Stewart	3198	34.3	
New Democratic Party	John Kinsella	2468	26.5	
Independent	Bob Mann	215	2.3	
