= Middleton Railway Museum =

Museum in Nova Scotia, Canada

- Museum logo
- Former name: Memory Lane Railway Museum
- Established: 2017
- Location: Middleton, Nova Scotia, Canada
- Coordinates: 44.9457°N 65.07254°W
- Type: Railway museum
- Visitors: 2,000+ (2024)
- Website: middletonrailwaymuseum.ca

The Middleton Railway Museum is a Canadian railway museum located in Middleton, Nova Scotia.

== History ==
The Museum occupies a Canadian Pacific Railway station built in 1916, the third station to have served the town of Middleton. Canadian Pacific closed the station in 1990 after freight traffic to Middleton on the Dominion Atlantic Railway ended.

The Middleton Railway Museum began in 1993 as a community museum named the Memory Lane Railway Museum. On 7 July 2017, the Middleton Railway Museum Society was established to facilitate operations of the museum.

The museum received the locomotive from the defunct Upper Clements Park in 2020, which had been there since 1989. On 29 December 2022, the museum acquired a steam locomotive, tender, and boxcar from the Museum of Industry in Stellarton, soon followed by the acquisition of a 117-year-old CNR 7260 engine which served as a switching engine in Bridgewater throughout the 1940s.

In April 2023, a fire started inside the Middleton Railway Museum during renovations. The fire destroyed some windows in the building and damaged the waiting room walls, but the fire was contained to only one room and damage to the museum was minimal. The building suffered extensive smoke damage as a result of the fire and was unable to re-open for over a year while undergoing repairs.

In 2024, the Middleton Railway Museum had over 2,000 visitors during its 60-day period of operation. The same year, museum acquired a CN caboose, donated by the Blackburn family of Bible Hill; as well as a vintage 32-foot Fruehauf trailer, purchased from the Fleetworx company of New Minas. In 2025, the museum completed the restoration of their building, holding on official opening on 7 June.

== Exhibits ==
The Middleton Railway Museum depicts early 20th century locomotive history, in an era when diesel engines were in the process of replacing steam engines. The museum's large model railway of the Annapolis Valley is a particularly popular attraction. The museum features a variety of rolling stock, a 75-foot turntable, and an extensive collection of artifacts relating to the Dominion Atlantic Railway.

== See also ==
- List of railway museums
- List of museums in Nova Scotia
