= Port Wade =

Community in Nova Scotia, Canada

Coordinates: 44°40′37.03″N 65°42′38.48″W

Port Wade in Nova Scotia

Port Wade is a community in the Canadian province of Nova Scotia, located in Annapolis County. It is situated at the foot of North Mountain on the shore of the Annapolis Basin. An earlier French name was Pree Bourgeois and it was later known as West Ferry until 1905 when it was named after Fletcher Bath Wade.

The Middleton and Victoria Beach Railway terminated here. Iron ore from mines at Torbrook was transshipped here.

Two houses in the village are municipally designated heritage properties. Captain James Anthony House was built c. 1853 in a modified Nova Scotia vernacular architectural style with Classical Revival influences. The Captain Snow House built c. 1895, is described as an impressive example of the modified Gothic Revival style with Italianate and Queen Anne Revival influences.
