= Nova Scotia Association of Architects =

The Nova Scotia Association of Architects (NSAA) is a professional association that regulates the practice of architecture in Nova Scotia, Canada. It was founded in 1932 and is empowered by the provincial Architects Act. The organisation is headquartered on Barrington Street in Halifax.

The NSAA administers the Lieutenant Governor Design Awards in Architecture, the premier architectural awards in the province.
