= Angus Morrison Gidney (writer) =

Canadian educator (1803–1882)

Angus Morrison Gidney (May 4, 1803 – January 20, 1882) was a Canadian educator, poet and journalist.

He was born in Jemseg, New Brunswick, the son of Joshua Gidney and Phoebe Morrison. The family settled on a farm near Bridgetown, Nova Scotia while he was still young. Gidney taught school for a number of years before becoming editor of the Novascotian in 1843; later that year, he became associate editor after William Annand purchased the paper. He was also parliamentary reporter for the Morning Chronicle. Gidney married Experience Beals. In 1845, he purchased the Yarmouth Herald. In 1851 Gidney abandoned journalism moving to Sandy Cove, Digby County, where he resumed teaching. In 1859, after temporarily leaving journalism, he became editor for the Digby Acadian. In 1862, he joined his son Ingraham at the Bridgetown Register, later renamed the Free Press. Gidney was the author of The refugee's daughter: a legend, a novel, parts of which were published in instalments in the Nova Scotian; it was later published in full in the Liverpool Transcript. He also contributed poetry to local periodicals in the province. Gidney was sergeant-at-arms for the Nova Scotia House of Assembly from 1868 to 1878. He also served as postmaster at Bridgetown for a short time. He died in Bridgetown at the age of 78.

== Sources ==
- Biography at the Dictionary of Canadian Biography Online
