= Harry Thompson MacKenzie =

Canadian politician

Harry Thompson MacKenzie (April 29, 1895 – May 22, 1952) was a manufacturer and political figure in Nova Scotia, Canada. He represented Annapolis County in the Nova Scotia House of Assembly from 1925 to 1933 as a Liberal-Conservative member.

He was born in Upper Granville, Annapolis County, Nova Scotia, the son of William Hugh MacKenzie and Sabina Crowe. He was educated at King's Collegiate School and the Maritime Business College. In 1921, he married Catherine Beatrice Crowe. MacKenzie served as a captain with Canadian units in both World War I and World War II. He was a member of the Bridgetown town council. MacKenzie died in Montreal at the age of 57.
