= Harris H. Chute =

Canadian politician

Harris Harding Chute (c. 1823 – 31 March 1892) was a general merchant and political figure in Nova Scotia, Canada. He represented Annapolis County in the Nova Scotia House of Assembly from 1890 to 1892 as a Liberal member. Chute died in Halifax at the age of 69.

He was born in Bear River, Nova Scotia and was educated there. In 1848, he married Elizabeth Rice. Chute served as a member of the municipal council and was warden of Annapolis County.
