= Frank R. Elliott =

Canadian politician

Frank Reagh Elliott (April 10, 1877 – November 4, 1931) was a hardware merchant and political figure in Nova Scotia, Canada. He represented Annapolis County in the Nova Scotia House of Assembly from 1916 to 1925 as a Liberal member.

He was born in Port George, Annapolis County, Nova Scotia, the son of Ainsley Elliott and Isabella Williams. In 1907, he married Ella Maude Chipman (February 9, 1880 – April 8, 1967), the daughter of Frederick Miles Chipman and Annie Sibella Fisher. Elliott served on the municipal council for Annapolis County. He died in Middleton at the age of 54.
