= Frank Andrews (politician) =

Canadian politician

Frank Andrews (January 7, 1854 – November 11, 1924) was a farmer, educator and political figure in Nova Scotia, Canada. He represented Annapolis County in the Nova Scotia House of Assembly from 1886 to 1890 as a Liberal-Conservative member.

He was born in Victoria Vale, Annapolis County, Nova Scotia, the son of John Andrews, who came to Nova Scotia from Cornwall, UK. Andrews was educated at Acadia College. He married Bertha Phinney from Massachusetts. For several years, Andrews was principal of a public school in Halifax.

Andrews died in Victoria, British Columbia on November 11, 1924.
