= Stephen McNeil =

Premier of Nova Scotia from 2013 to 2021

The Honourable Stephen McNeil ECNS
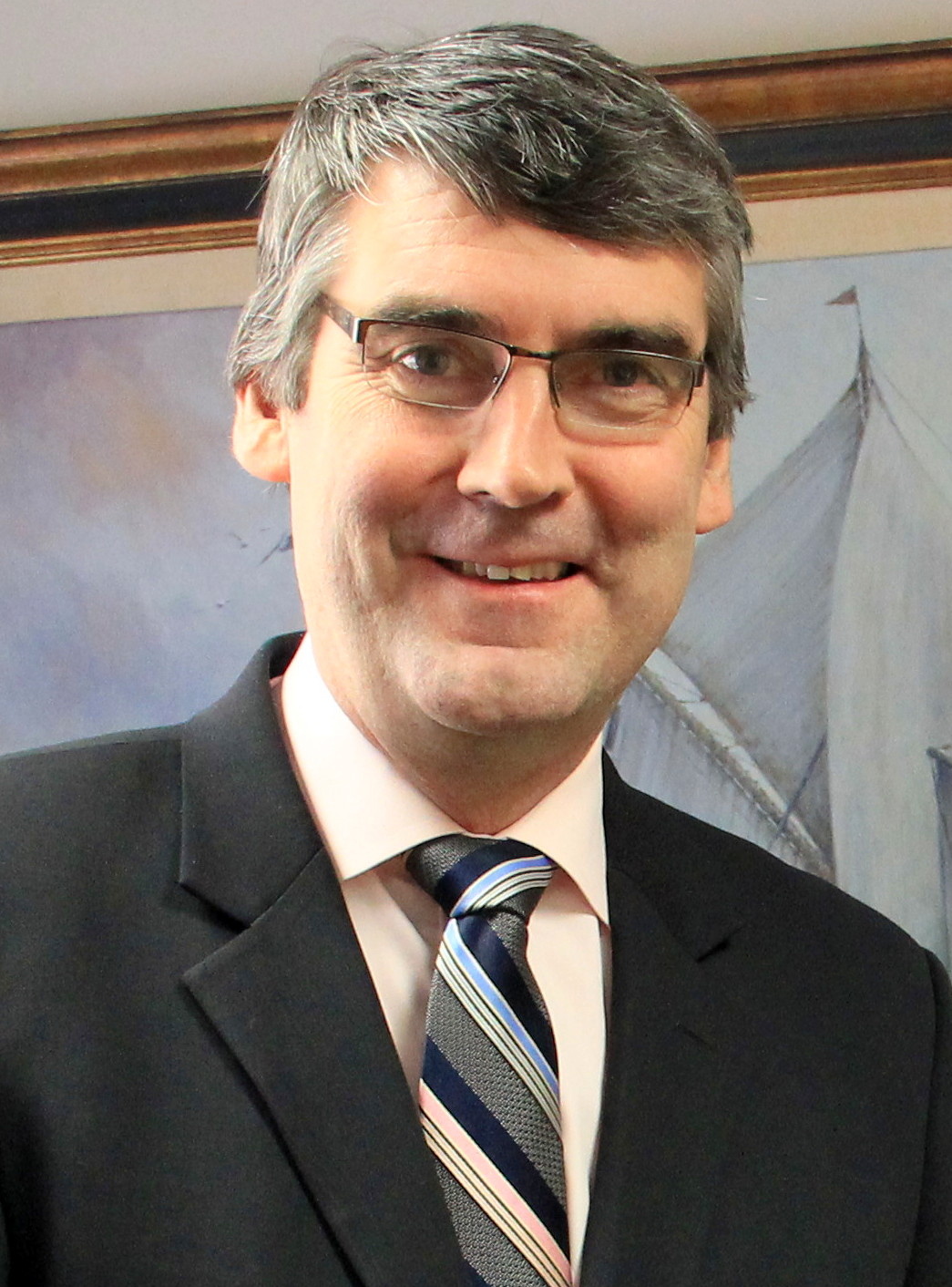
- McNeil in 2014

28th Premier of Nova Scotia
- In office October 22, 2013 – February 23, 2021
- Monarch: Elizabeth II
- Lieutenant Governor: John J. Grant; Arthur J. LeBlanc
- Deputy: Karen Casey
- Preceded by: Darrell Dexter
- Succeeded by: Iain Rankin

Leader of the Opposition (Nova Scotia)
- In office June 19, 2009 – October 22, 2013
- Preceded by: Darrell Dexter
- Succeeded by: Jamie Baillie

Leader of the Nova Scotia Liberal Party
- In office April 27, 2007 – February 6, 2021
- Preceded by: Michel Samson (interim)
- Succeeded by: Iain Rankin

Member of the Nova Scotia House of Assembly for Annapolis
- In office August 5, 2003 – May 3, 2021
- Preceded by: Frank Chipman
- Succeeded by: Carman Kerr

Personal details
- Born: November 10, 1964 (age 61) Halifax, Nova Scotia, Canada
- Party: Liberal Party
- Height: 6 ft 7 in (201 cm)
- Spouse: Andrea
- Children: 2
- Education: Nova Scotia Community College
- Occupation: Politician

Stephen McNeil ECNS (born November 10, 1964) is a Canadian politician who served as the 28th premier of Nova Scotia from 2013 to 2021. He also represented the riding of Annapolis in the Nova Scotia House of Assembly from 2003 to 2021 and was the leader of the Nova Scotia Liberal Party from 2007 to 2021.

== Early life ==
McNeil was born in Halifax, Nova Scotia, the 12th of 17 children. His mother, Theresa McNeil, was the first female high sheriff in Canada and is a recipient of the Order of Nova Scotia. McNeil attended the Nova Scotia Community College, and owned a small business for 15 years between 1988 and 2003.

== Political career ==
McNeil first sought election in 1999 but was defeated. During that election McNeil indicated in a questionnaire provided by the campaign life coalition that he was pro-life. In 2013 a spokesperson for McNeil said his views had evolved since 1999 and he was no longer pro-life. He ran again in 2003 and was elected to the Nova Scotia House of Assembly.

On January 30, 2007, McNeil announced he would run in the election to become leader of the Liberal Party. He was endorsed by Leo Glavine, Harold Theriault, Wayne Gaudet, Robert Thibault, Rodger Cuzner, Jim Cowan, Don Downe and Dr. Jim Smith. On April 28, 2007 at the Liberal Leadership Convention in Dartmouth, Nova Scotia, McNeil was elected leader on the second ballot over runner-up Diana Whalen.

In the 2009 election, McNeil led the Liberals to Official Opposition status, winning 11 seats.

In the 2013 election, his party won a majority government, defeating the NDP government of Darrell Dexter.

In the 2017 election, his party retained a reduced majority of 27 seats in the legislature.

On August 6, 2020, McNeil announced that he would resign as leader of the Liberal Party and as Premier of Nova Scotia in early 2021. He was succeeded by Rankin as Liberal leader on February 6, 2021 and as premier on February 23, 2021.

== Premier of Nova Scotia ==
McNeil was sworn in as Premier of Nova Scotia, along with his cabinet by Lieutenant Governor of Nova Scotia John James Grant on October 22, 2013 in Annapolis Royal. This was the first time since 1954 that the swearing in ceremony has been held outside the provincial capital of Halifax. McNeil lead the first Liberal government in Nova Scotia in 14 years after a majority win to take 33 of Nova Scotia's 51 provincial seats; during much of that time the Nova Scotia Liberal Party held third party status in the legislature.

The McNeil government faced difficulty in the first year of its government with two controversial stories about patronage and nepotism. Just days after being sworn in, Liberal candidate Glennie Langille was offered the job of Chief Protocol Officer. Critics said this was a return to days of political patronage and the job should have gone to the most qualified candidate in an open competition, while advocates said the Premier had done nothing against the rules. A government contract given to the premier's brother was also questioned. Critics had a problem with the fact that McNeil's brother's company was not officially registered with the Registry of Joint Stocks until the day after the tender closed, while advocates said being the premier's brother should not preclude him from receiving government contracts. Nova Scotia's Conflict of Interest Commissioner found no conflict with McNeil's brother's contract.

The McNeil government's first session of the legislature lasted only 11 sitting days, the shortest fall sitting since fall sittings were made mandatory in 1994. The McNeil government was not required to hold a fall session of the legislature, as legislative sessions are not required for six months after an election. Campaign commitments by McNeil's Liberal government were met during the first session of the Nova Scotia House of Assembly, passing three significant pieces of legislation during this session. The first was a law meant to open the electricity market to more producers. Critics said this law would neither reduce power rates, nor break Nova Scotia Power's monopoly, while advocates said it would soon allow for renewable electricity companies to sell directly to consumers. Another piece of notable legislation was for a statutory holiday in February. Critics said this would hurt the small business community, while advocates said it would help families spend more time together. Another commitment met included legislation to make economic investments more transparent and accountable. Another piece of notable legislation was the Liberal government's commitment to ban the importation of fracking wastewater from other jurisdictions.

The McNeil government's first spring of the legislature saw three significant controversies. The Liberals passed essential services legislation that ended a strike by nurses in Halifax who were protesting working conditions. Opponents of Bill 37 said it took away the right to fair collective bargaining and would set back labour relations in the province, while the government said it was necessary to protect health care. Public sector workers from various unions protested the bill.

The second controversial legislation was the Financial Measures Act, which eliminated the Graduate Retention Rebate – a tax rebate given to graduates who stayed in the province to work. The government said the program was not working and that student groups wanted it cut.

The third controversy stemmed from the McNeil government's April 2015 budget. The budget provided for the elimination of the crown agency Film and Creative Industries Nova Scotia, as well as an overhaul of the long-standing Nova Scotia Film Tax Credit. This move appeared to break a pre-election promise made by McNeil in October 2013, and resulted in an outpouring of protest from the creative community. Under political pressure, McNeil was forced to abandon the changes tabled in the budget. The Liberal government instead introduced a new incentive program for the film and television industry: the Nova Scotia Film Production Incentive Fund. The Liberals' first budget forecast a $279 million deficit, and included money to cap class sizes and recruit doctors. Two significant pieces of legislation were introduced. The government took the interest off Nova Scotia student loans for graduates who stay in Nova Scotia, and created a jobs fund called Invest Nova Scotia.

In December 2015, the McNeil government introduced and passed Bill 148, The Public Services Sustainability Act, which established a legislated wage framework for public sector workers that included a two-year wage freeze and placed limits on interest arbitration. The legislation also removed previously negotiated retirement service awards from existing collective agreements. The constitutionality of the legislation was challenged by several public sector unions along with the Nova Scotia Federation of Labour. In February 2026, the Act was found unconstitutional by the Supreme Court of Nova Scotia.

McNeil announced on August 6, 2020, that he would be stepping down as Premier of Nova Scotia and leaving public office. In his announcement he confirmed he will remain as premier and leader of the Liberal Party until Iain Rankin is sworn in.

== Electoral record ==
2021 Nova Scotia general election: Annapolis
Party	Candidate	Votes	%	±%	Expenditures
Liberal	Carman Kerr	4,231	49.62	-16.49	$62,306.44
Progressive Conservative	Jennifer Ehrenfeld-Poole	2,753	32.29	+17.38	$62,874.75
New Democratic	Cheryl Burbidge	1,127	13.22	-0.71	$27,596.93
Green	Krista Grear	306	3.59	-0.10	$4,098.82
Atlantica	Mark Robertson	109	1.28	-0.08	$200.00
Total valid votes/expense limit		8,526	99.52		$86,588.94
Total rejected ballots		41	0.48		
Turnout		8,567	57.00		
Eligible voters		15,030			
Liberal hold		Swing		-16.94	
Source: Elections Nova Scotia

2017 Nova Scotia general election
Party	Candidate	Votes	%	±%
Liberal	Stephen McNeil	6,410	64.72	-11.16
New Democratic Party	Colin Sproul	1,517	15.31	+7.1
Progressive Conservative	Virginia Hurlock	1,480	14.94	+1.26
Green	Zac Crockatt	366	3.69	+1.46
Atlantica	Kent Robinson	130	1.31	-

2013 Nova Scotia general election
Party	Candidate	Votes	%	±%
Liberal	Stephen McNeil	7,709	75.88	+2.56
Progressive Conservative	Virginia Hurlock	1,390	13.68	+2.63
New Democratic Party	Henry Spurr	834	8.21	-5.17
Green	Ron Neufeld	227	2.23	-0.02

2009 Nova Scotia general election
Party	Candidate	Votes	%	±%
Liberal	Stephen McNeil	6,446	73.32	+17.12
New Democratic Party	Henry Spurr	1,176	13.38	-3.37
Progressive Conservative	Kent Robinson	971	11.05	-5.7
Green	Jamie Spinney	198	2.25	-0.23

2006 Nova Scotia general election
Party	Candidate	Votes	%	±%
Liberal	Stephen McNeil	4668	56.20	+5.37
Progressive Conservative	Blair Hannam	2041	24.57	-6.85
New Democratic Party	Malcolm John (Calum) MacKenzie	1391	16.75	+1.1
Green	Ken McGowen	206	2.48	-

2003 Nova Scotia general election
Party	Candidate	Votes	%	±%
Liberal	Stephen McNeil	4522	50.83	+12.01
Progressive Conservative	Frank Chipman	2795	31.42	-15.61
New Democratic Party	Adrian Nette	1395	15.68	-2.75
Nova Scotia Party	Harry Wilson	185	2.08	-0.8

1999 Nova Scotia general election
Party	Candidate	Votes	%	±%
Progressive Conservative	Frank Chipman	4026	43.43	+9.1
Liberal	Stephen McNeil	3265	35.22	-1.8
New Democratic Party	Tom Clahane	1708	18.43	-8.1
Nova Scotia Party	Paul Mann	271	2.92	-
