= Obediah Parker Goucher =

Canadian politician (1865–1947)

- Born: February 2, 1865; Melvern Square, Annapolis County, Nova Scotia, Canada
- Died: June 12, 1947 (aged 82); Middleton, Nova Scotia, Canada
- Education: Acadia University
- Occupations: Educator, insurance agent, political figure

Obediah Parker Goucher (February 2, 1865 – June 12, 1947) was a Canadian school teacher, insurance agent and political figure, active in Nova Scotia. He represented Annapolis County from 1925 to 1933 as a Liberal-Conservative member.

He was born in Melvern Square, Annapolis County, Nova Scotia, the son of W. Henry Goucher and Margaret Parker. He was educated at the provincial normal school and Acadia University. In 1893, he married Ardellice K. Dodge. Goucher was mayor of Middleton from 1912 to 1915. He served in the province's Executive Council as a minister without portfolio from 1928 to 1930 and as Minister of Agriculture from 1930 to 1933. Goucher died in Middleton at the age of 80.
