= Carman Kerr =

Canadian politician

Member of the Nova Scotia House of Assembly for Annapolis
- In office August 17, 2021 – October 27, 2024
- Preceded by: Stephen McNeil
- Succeeded by: David Bowlby

Personal details
- Born: Annapolis County, Nova Scotia
- Party: Liberal
- Occupation: Politician
- Website: carmankerr.ca

Carman Kerr is a Canadian politician, who was elected to the Nova Scotia House of Assembly in the 2021 Nova Scotia general election. He represented the riding of Annapolis as a member of the Nova Scotia Liberal Party from 2021-2024.

Prior to becoming an MLA, Kerr worked in the tourism sector. He is a member of the Natural Resources and Economic Development Committee. As of September 22, 2024, Kerr serves as the Official Opposition critic for Agriculture.

He was unseated in the 2024 Nova Scotia general election by a margin of 7 votes.

== Bills introduced ==
Assembly	Act Title	Date
Assembly 64, Session 1	Sustainable Forest Practices Accountability Act	October 18, 2021

== Electoral record ==
2021 Nova Scotia general election
Party	Candidate	Votes	%	±%
Liberal	Carman Kerr	4,231	49.62	-16.49
Progressive Conservative	Jennifer Ehrenfeld-Poole	2,753	32.29	+17.38
New Democratic	Cheryl Burbidge	1,127	13.22	-0.71
Green	Krista Grear	306	3.59	-0.10
Atlantica	Mark Robertson	109	1.28	-0.08
Total valid votes		8,526	99.52	
Total rejected ballots		41	0.48	
Turnout		8,567	57.80	
Eligible voters		14,821		
Liberal hold		Swing		-16.94
Source: Elections Nova Scotia
