= James Wilberforce Longley =

Canadian politician

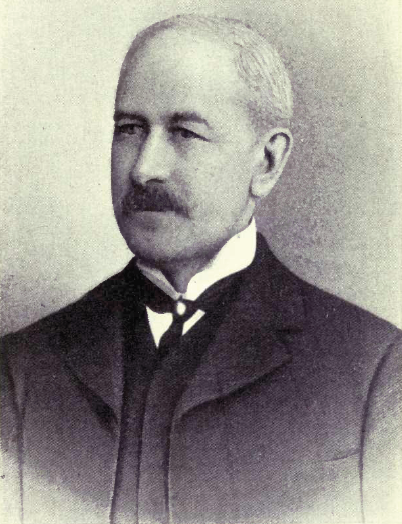

Member of the Nova Scotia House of Assembly for Annapolis
- In office 1882–1906

Personal details
- Born: 4 January 1849 Paradise, Nova Scotia
- Died: 16 March 1922 (aged 73) Halifax, Nova Scotia
- Party: Liberal

James Wilberforce Longley (4 January 1849 – 16 March 1922) was a Canadian journalist, lawyer, politician, and judge.

Born in Paradise, Annapolis County, Nova Scotia, the son of Israel Longley and Frances Manning, Longley received a Bachelor of Arts degree in 1871 and a Master of Arts degree in 1877 from Acadia College. In 1871, he moved to Halifax and studied law with Hiram Blanchard. He was called to the Bar in 1875 and practiced law in Halifax from 1875 to 1882. He was also a journalist working for the Acadian Recorder. In 1887, he was appointed managing editor of the Halifax Morning Chronicle.

In 1882, he was elected to the Nova Scotia House of Assembly for the electoral district of Annapolis County. From 1884 to 1886, he was a minister without portfolio in the cabinet of William Stevens Fielding. From 1886 to 1905, he was the attorney general. He ran unsuccessfully as the Liberal candidate for the House of Commons of Canada for the electoral district of Annapolis in the 1896 election.

In 1898, he was made a fellow of the Royal Society of Canada. In 1905, he was appointed to the Supreme Court of Nova Scotia.

His uncle Avard Longley was a Member of the House of Assembly and Member of Parliament.

James Wilberforce Longley died in Halifax on 16 March 1922.
