= Torbrook =

Community in Nova Scotia, Canada

Coordinates: 44°54′50.86″N 64°58′39.08″W

Torbrook in Nova Scotia

Torbrook is a community in the Canadian province of Nova Scotia, located in Annapolis County. It is located on the South Mountain of Nova Scotia's Annapolis Valley to the east of the Nictaux River.

The community was settled in the early 19th century by New England Planters and United Empire Loyalists from nearby Nictaux. Residents chose the name "Torbrook" in 1856 from an old English word meaning "Where the brook comes out of the hill." Iron deposits were discovered and mined on a small scale for about 15 years in mid 1800s and then on a larger scale beginning in 1890 by the Canadian Iron Company. The area around the mines became known as Torbrook Mines. By 1910, the Canada Iron Company's No. 2 Mine at Torbrook Mines was employing 120 men to produce 11,000 tons of iron ore a year. The ore was shipped from the 3 & 1/2 mile long spur to Nictaux and then 55 miles on the Halifax and Southwestern Railway to Port Wade, Nova Scotia where a larger wharf and lading facility transfer the ore to steamships. However, the volume of ore shipments did not grow as expected and the mines closed about 1913. After the mines closed, farming and lumbering remained as the main occupation.
