= Middleton, Nova Scotia =

Middleton Am Baile Meadhanach (Scottish Gaelic)
- Town
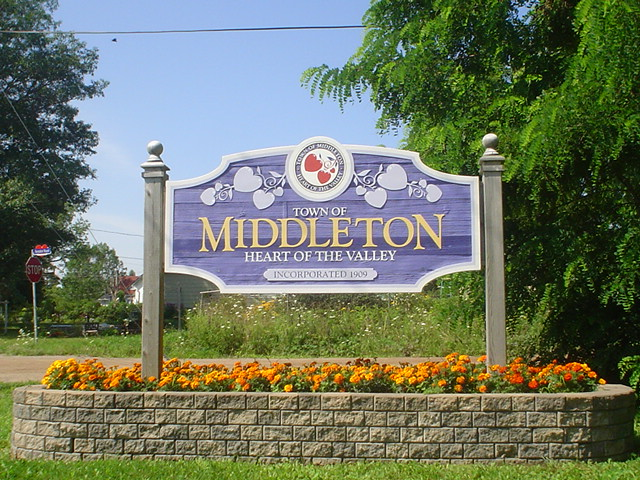

- Motto: The Heart of the Valley
- Location of Middleton, Nova Scotia
- Coordinates: 44°56′30.48″N 65°4′6.96″W
- Country: Canada
- Province: Nova Scotia
- County: Annapolis County
- Founded: 1810
- Incorporated: May 31, 1909
- Electoral Districts Federal: West Nova
- Provincial: Annapolis

Government
  - Mayor: Gail Smith
  - Governing Body: Middleton Town Council
  - MLA: Carman Kerr (L)
  - MP: Colin Fraser (L)

Area (2021)
  - Land: 5.55 km^{2} (2.14 sq mi)
- Elevation: 21 m (69 ft)

Population (2021)
  - Total: 1,873
  - Density: 337.3/km^{2} (874/sq mi)
- Time zone: UTC−4 (AST)
- Postal code: B0S
- Area code: 902
- Telephone Exchange: 309, 363, 824, 825, 840
- Median Earnings*: $49,200
- Website: discovermiddleton.ca
- Median household income, 2020

Middleton is a town in Annapolis County, Nova Scotia, Canada. Situated on the north bank of the Annapolis River, it is located close to the centre of the Annapolis Valley, from which it gets its nickname, "The Heart of the Valley".

== History ==
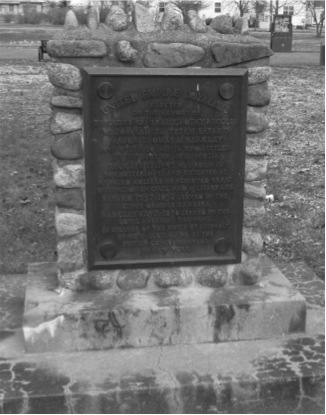
Monument to Loyalists Timothy Ruggles, Samuel Bayard of the King's Orange Rangers and Major Thomas Barkclay of the Loyal American Regiment, Middleton Park, Middleton, Nova Scotia

Where the Annapolis River and the Nictaux River meet was a popular shad fishing spot for Mi'kmaq families before the arrival of the European settlers. It would be later settled by French Acadians that used these waterways to reach the capital of Port-Royal and farming. In the late 1750s the region was settled by New England Planters, and Loyalists to replace the ousted French Acadians. The first four families to be granted land there would later comprise the town of Middleton. They included families with names like Gates and Marshall and Richardson. Col. Philip Richardson received six lots of two hundred and fifty acres each, which ran from the Annapolis River halfway to the Mountain to the north, while his neighbour to the west, Anthony Marshall, got two 424-acre lots which ran all the way to the top of the mountain. A Neily family, from Ireland via Ardoise in Hants County, got the next two lots in what would be Lower Middleton, while Benjamin Chesley got the last two lots, next to the town limits.

At a public meeting held December 18, 1854, Rev. James Robertson having been appointed chairman and W. A. Fowler, secretary, passed the resolution unanimously. 'Resolved, first, that the locality hitherto known as Wilmot Corner, or Fowler's Corner, be henceforth called by the name of Middleton'. This name was chosen by its citizens and selected because of its location midway between Halifax and Yarmouth.

The town was incorporated in 1909.

== Demographics ==
Historical population
Year	Pop.	±%
1956	1,769	—
1961	1,921	+8.6%
1981	1,834	−4.5%
1986	1,772	−3.4%
1991	1,819	+2.7%
1996	1,800	−1.0%
2001	1,744	−3.1%
2006	1,829	+4.9%
2011	1,749	−4.4%
2016	1,832	+4.7%
2021	1,873	+2.2%

In the 2021 Census of Population conducted by Statistics Canada, Middleton had a population of 1,873 living in 922 of its 977 total private dwellings, a change of 2.2% from its 2016 population of 1,832. With a land area of 5.55 km^{2} (2.14 sq mi), it had a population density of 337.5/km^{2} (874.1/sq mi) in 2021.

== Economy ==
The re-opening of the Torbrook Iron Mines and the second railway line in 1889 sparked a decade of rapid growth and development. With many industries supporting and connected to the agriculture and manufacturing industry. Today the town's economy is also heavily influenced by its proximity to the air force base CFB Greenwood in nearby Kings County.

== Board of Trade ==
The early records of the Board of Trade were lost in the Great Fire of 1911 but from the reports of its initial activities, the board was formed out of a need to vigorously pursue the issues of the day which affected business and industry - railway schedules and rates, street lighting and a variety of matters involving the municipal government of the day. Two merchants, Harry Reed and Gorden Gross, formed the Board, with newspaper publisher Fred Cox as their secretary-treasurer.

== Transportation ==
Middleton is at the half-way point between Halifax and Yarmouth on Highway 101 and Trunk 1.

Middleton is the northern terminus of Trunk 10 which connects the town with Bridgewater and Lunenburg on the South Shore.

The town was located on the Dominion Atlantic Railway's (DAR) mainline from Halifax to Yarmouth and was also served by CN Rail's line from Bridgewater to Bridgetown (and on to Victoria Beach). CN Rail abandoned its line through Middleton in 1982; it had formerly been the Nova Scotia Central Railway (NSCR). The DAR abandoned its mainline through the town in March 1990, following the January 15, 1990, abandonment of the Evangeline passenger train service by Via Rail. The abandoned DAR and CN railway lines are currently owned by the Government of Nova Scotia and used as recreational trails. The 1917 railway station is now the Middleton Railway Museum.

== Parks ==
- Centennial Park
- Cottage Cove Provincial Park
- Riverside Park
- Rotary Park

== Institutions ==
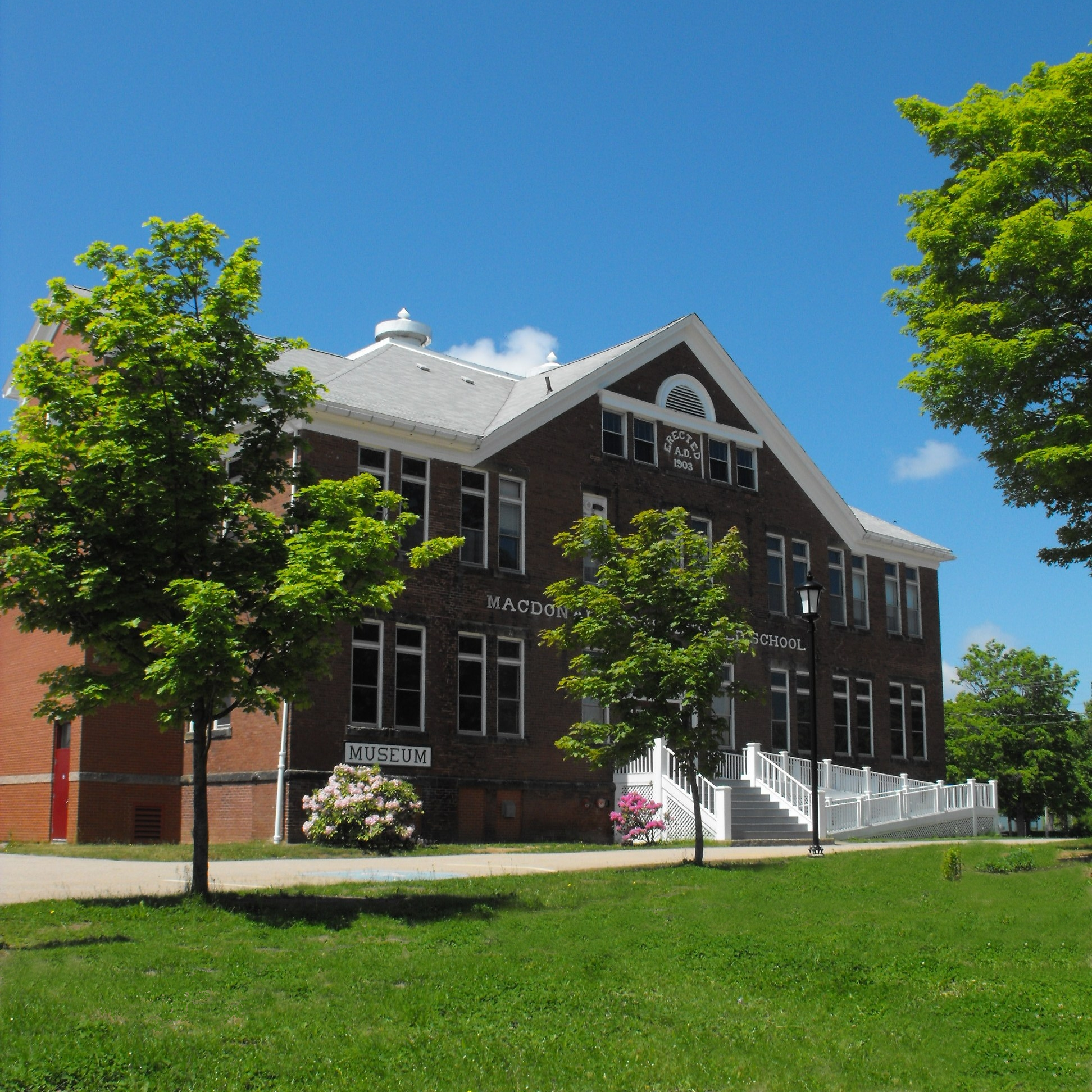
MacDonald Museum

Middleton is home to two public schools: Annapolis East Elementary School serves grades Primary-5, and Middleton Regional High School serves grades 6-12. The town is also home to a Nova Scotia Community College campus.

Soldiers Memorial Hospital is located in the town and provides tertiary care services for the eastern part of Annapolis County. The provincial government funded construction of the 50-bed Heart of the Valley Long Term Care Centre in the town which opened in late 2009.

Middleton is home to the Annapolis Valley MacDonald Museum, which is housed in the original Macdonald Consolidated School. This school, founded in 1903, was the first consolidated school in Canada, established with a grant from the Macdonald Tobacco Company of Montreal. The museum has many travelling exhibits, and is the home of the Nova Scotia Museum Clock collection.

The former Dominion Atlantic/Canadian Pacific Railway station is now home to the Middleton Railway Museum, dedicated to the history of transportation in the town.

== Festivals and events ==
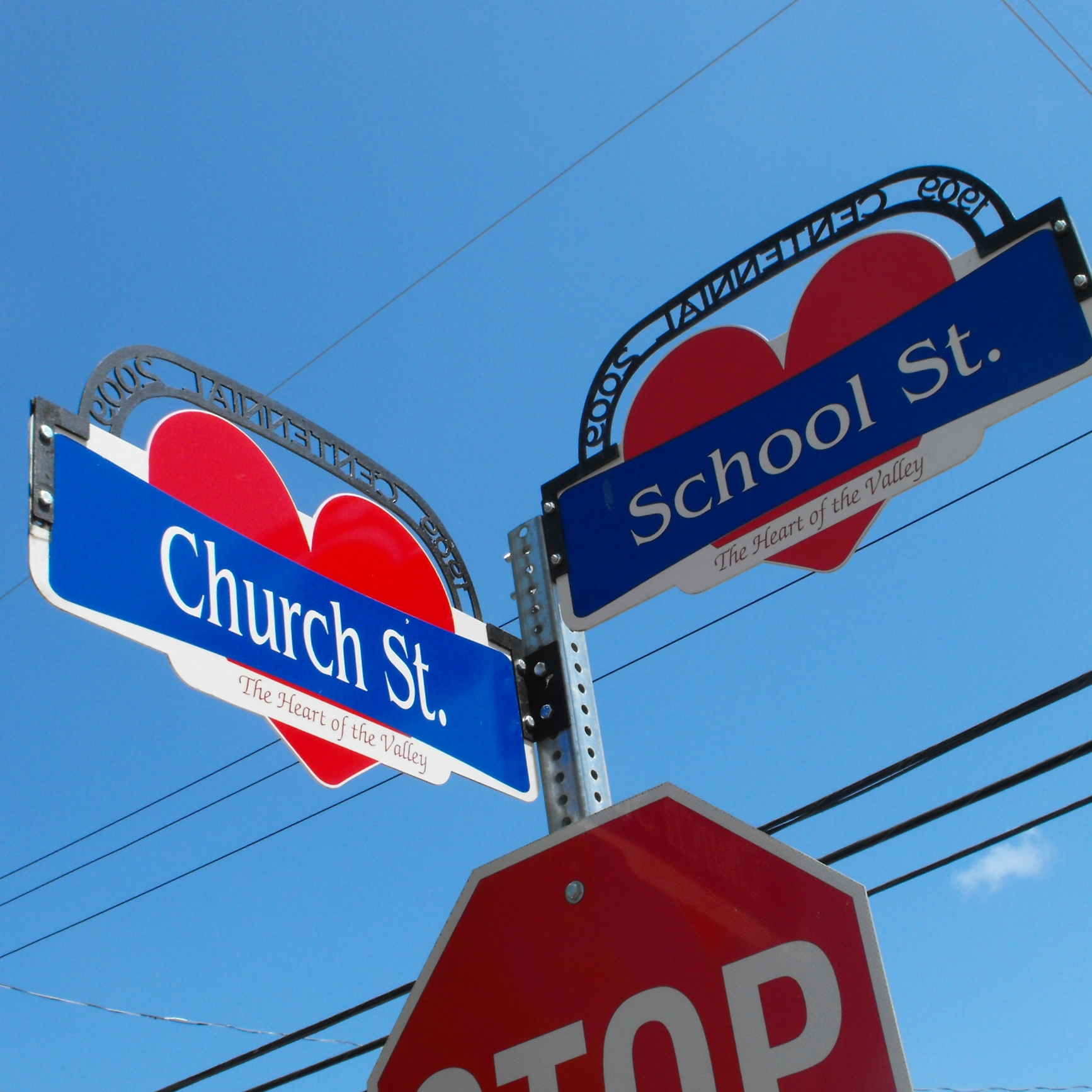
Colourful Middleton street signs

Middleton hosts an annual three-day festival called "Heart of the Valley Days" every summer, during the month of July.

Middleton Farmers' Market was founded in 2008. It is held every Friday during the summer and fall in the park across from the Town Office from 3 pm to 7 pm. The Market is a non-profit member-run organization of market vendors and individuals.

Middleton has an official town crier who has performed his functions for the town since 1984. He has attended all Heart of The Valley parades and attended town crier competitions in Nova Scotia, New Brunswick, England and Belgium on behalf of the town. In 1988 he organized and hosted the first Heart of the Valley International Town Criers Challenge. In 2009, as part of Middleton's centenary celebrations, the second Heart of the Valley International Town Criers Challenge was held.

== Notable residents ==
- Hanson Dowell (1906–2000) - President of the Canadian Amateur Hockey Association and member of the Nova Scotia House of Assembly
- Frank R. Elliott (1877–1931) - Political figure
- Obediah Parker Goucher (1865–1947) - Former mayor
- Bob Hess (born 1955) - NHL defenseman St. Louis Blues
- Cail MacLean (born 1976) - Professional athlete, hockey coach
- John D. McKenzie (1889–1952) - Businessman and politician
- Mona Louise Parsons (1901–1976) - Former Canadian actress, nurse, and member of a Dutch resistance network
- Earle Rafuse (1930–1998) - Business owner, political figure
- William Benjamin Ross (1855–1929) - Halifax lawyer, business owner, political figure
- William Sampson (1959–2012) - Torture victim, biochemist, author
- Holly Taylor (1997-) - Actor in The Americans

== See also ==
- List of municipalities in Nova Scotia
