= Clam Point, Nova Scotia =

Clam Point
- Community
- Location of Clam Point, Nova Scotia
- Coordinates: 43.491667°N 65.573611°W
- Country: Canada
- Province: Nova Scotia
- County: Shelburne
- Municipal district: Barrington
- Time zone: UTC-4 (AST)
  - Summer (DST): UTC-3 (ADT)
- Postal code(s): B0W 1N0
- Area code: 902
- Access Routes: Stoney Island Road via Route 330

Clam Point is a community on Cape Sable Island in the Canadian province of Nova Scotia, located in the Municipality of the District of Barrington of Shelburne County.

== See also ==
- List of communities in Nova Scotia
