= Smithsville, Nova Scotia =

Smithsville
- Community
- Location of Smithsville, Nova Scotia
- Coordinates: 43.486667°N 65.469722°W
- Country: Canada
- Province: Nova Scotia
- County: Shelburne
- Municipal district: Barrington
- Time zone: UTC-4 (AST)
  - Summer (DST): UTC-3 (ADT)
- Postal code(s): B0W 1E0
- Area code: 902

Smithsville is a community in the Canadian province of Nova Scotia, located in the Municipality of the District of Barrington of Shelburne County.

Smithsville is one of a string of communities along Port LaTour Road, which is the only paved road into or out of Smithsville. The sign at the northern limit of Smithsville reads "Smithsville", but the sign at the southern limit reads "Smithville."

== See also ==
- List of communities in Nova Scotia
