= Crowell, Nova Scotia =

Crowell
- Locality
- Location of Crowell, Nova Scotia
- Coordinates: 43.5425°N 65.606389°W
- Country: Canada
- Province: Nova Scotia
- County: Shelburne
- Municipal district: Barrington
- Time zone: UTC-4 (AST)
  - Summer (DST): UTC-3 (ADT)
- Postal code(s): B0W 1S0
- Area code: 902
- Access Routes: Trunk 3

Crowell is a locality in the Canadian province of Nova Scotia, located in the Municipality of the District of Barrington of Shelburne County.

Originally a community, it was amalgamated with the community of Barrington Passage in 2006.

== See also ==
- List of communities in Nova Scotia
