= Blanche, Nova Scotia =

Blanche
- Community
- Location of Blanche, Nova Scotia
- Coordinates: 43.504722°N 65.405833°W
- Country: Canada
- Province: Nova Scotia
- County: Shelburne
- Municipal district: Barrington
- Time zone: UTC-4 (AST)
  - Summer (DST): UTC-3 (ADT)
- Area code: 902

Blanche is a community in the Canadian province of Nova Scotia, located in the Municipality of the District of Barrington of Shelburne County.

== History ==
The historical research of Joseph R. Ross did not reveal any French colonial settlement in Blanche or more broadly the Blanche peninsula. Documents from New France refer to this peninsula as Blanc – as the white rocks of its coast were a navigational landmark. When this area became English territory, the English name Blanch was applied, with the name "Blanche" being of more recent usage.

Among the first English settlers were the families of: Samuel Bootman, John & Elizabeth Coffin, Nathan & Susan Nickerson (at Chaps Old Place), James & Elizabeth Obed, Peter Conk (at Lyles Old Place).

The Blanche School operated until 1950, at which point it had only two students (Mervin Perry, Elizabeth Swaine) and one teacher Mary Attwood Swaine. The students were transferred to the Cape Negro school and the building was closed until 1963, when it was re-purposed as the Blanche community hall with a kitchen addition.

After the canal was built at the traditional Hawl Over (or Haul Over) portage site, the New England settlers used the Blanche peninsula (now completely separated from the mainland by water) as a location for free-ranging sheep. From the 1800s until the early 1950s communal sheep herding and shearing of these free-ranging sheep was performed once a year.

== See also ==
- List of communities in Nova Scotia
