= Thomasville, Nova Scotia =

Thomasville
- Community
- Location of Thomasville, Nova Scotia
- Coordinates: 43.566667°N 65.453056°W
- Country: Canada
- Province: Nova Scotia
- County: Shelburne
- Municipal district: Barrington
- Time zone: UTC-4 (AST)
  - Summer (DST): UTC-3 (ADT)
- Postal code(s): B0W 1E0
- Area code: 902
- Access Routes: Route 309

Thomasville is a community in the Canadian province of Nova Scotia, located in the Municipality of the District of Barrington of Shelburne County.

== See also ==
- List of communities in Nova Scotia
