= Newellton, Nova Scotia =

Newellton
- Community
- Location of Newellton, Nova Scotia
- Coordinates: 43.468333°N 65.633611°W
- Country: Canada
- Province: Nova Scotia
- County: Shelburne
- Municipal district: Barrington
- Time zone: UTC-4 (AST)
  - Summer (DST): UTC-3 (ADT)
- Area code: 902
- Access Routes: Route 330

Newellton is a community on Cape Sable Island in the Municipality of the District of Barrington of Shelburne County, Nova Scotia, Canada.

== See also ==
- List of communities in Nova Scotia
