= The Hawk, Nova Scotia =

The Hawk
- Community
- Location of The Hawk, Nova Scotia
- Coordinates: 43.417778°N 65.621111°W
- Country: Canada
- Province: Nova Scotia
- County: Shelburne
- Municipal district: Barrington
- Time zone: UTC-4 (AST)
  - Summer (DST): UTC-3 (ADT)
- Area code: 902
- Access Routes: Hawk Point Road via Route 330

The Hawk is a community on Cape Sable Island in the Canadian province of Nova Scotia, located in the Municipality of the District of Barrington of Shelburne County. It is the most southerly community in Nova Scotia, as well as the most southerly anywhere in Canada outside of Ontario.

== History ==
The Hawk is said to be named for a shipwreck that washed ashore there during the early days of settlement, and the name "Hawk inlet" was used as early as 1819.

A schoolhouse was built at The Hawk in 1875, with new schools built in 1890 and 1951. A lighthouse was built at The Hawk in 1861.

The Hawk had a population of 243 people in 1956.

== The Hawk Beach ==
The beach at The Hawk is located within the Cape Sable Important Bird Area. Visible from the beach is the 101-foot-tall Cape Sable Lighthouse.

The beach is known for its birdwatching opportunities, particularly for birds such as the common eider, oldsquaw, scoter sea ducks, phalaropes, and terns. The area is also a nesting spot for piping plovers.

== See also ==
- List of communities in Nova Scotia
