= West Head, Nova Scotia =

West Head
- Community
- Location of West Head, Nova Scotia
- Coordinates: 43.4575°N 65.646667°W
- Country: Canada
- Province: Nova Scotia
- County: Shelburne
- Municipal district: Barrington
- Time zone: UTC-4 (AST)
  - Summer (DST): UTC-3 (ADT)
- Area code: 902
- Access Routes: Route 330

West Head is a community on Cape Sable Island in the Canadian province of Nova Scotia, located in the Municipality of the District of Barrington of Shelburne County.

== History ==
West Head is named for a large headland in the area. A lighthouse was built there, which began operating on 20 August 1888.

In 1956, West Head had a population of 195 people.

== See also ==
- List of communities in Nova Scotia
