= Atwoods Brook, Nova Scotia =

Atwoods Brook
- Community
- Location of Atwoods Brook, Nova Scotia
- Coordinates: 43.509167°N 65.655278°W
- Country: Canada
- Province: Nova Scotia
- County: Shelburne
- Municipal district: Barrington
- Time zone: UTC-4 (AST)
  - Summer (DST): UTC-3 (ADT)
- Area code: 902
- Access Routes: Trunk 3

Atwoods Brook is a community in the Canadian province of Nova Scotia, located in the Barrington municipal district of Shelburne County.

== See also ==
- List of communities in Nova Scotia
