= Charlesville, Nova Scotia =

Charlesville
- Community
- Location of Charlesville, Nova Scotia
- Coordinates: 43.5825°N 65.778889°W
- Country: Canada
- Province: Nova Scotia
- County: Shelburne
- Municipal district: Barrington
- Time zone: UTC-4 (AST)
  - Summer (DST): UTC-3 (ADT)
- Area code: 902
- Access Routes: Trunk 3

Charlesville is a community in the Canadian province of Nova Scotia, located in the Municipality of the District of Barrington of Shelburne County. Settled by land grantees in the late 1700s and early 1800s and called Pubnico Beach until 1865 when the name changed to honour Rev. Charles Oram, a popular minister.

== Climate ==
Charlesville experiences an oceanic climate (Köppen: Cfb) with cold, snowy winters and mild summers.

Climate data for Charlesville (1981–2010)
Month	Jan	Feb	Mar	Apr	May	Jun	Jul	Aug	Sep	Oct	Nov	Dec	Year
Record high °C (°F)	14.0 (57.2)	12.5 (54.5)	16.5 (61.7)	23.5 (74.3)	25.0 (77.0)	29.0 (84.2)	30.0 (86.0)	29.0 (84.2)	27.0 (80.6)	27.5 (81.5)	18.5 (65.3)	15.5 (59.9)	30.0 (86.0)
Mean daily maximum °C (°F)	1.7 (35.1)	1.9 (35.4)	4.2 (39.6)	8.2 (46.8)	12.4 (54.3)	16.3 (61.3)	18.5 (65.3)	19.3 (66.7)	17.7 (63.9)	13.5 (56.3)	9.1 (48.4)	4.4 (39.9)	10.6 (51.1)
Daily mean °C (°F)	−2 (28)	−1.7 (28.9)	0.8 (33.4)	4.9 (40.8)	8.9 (48.0)	12.7 (54.9)	15.1 (59.2)	15.8 (60.4)	14.2 (57.6)	10.2 (50.4)	5.8 (42.4)	0.9 (33.6)	7.1 (44.8)
Mean daily minimum °C (°F)	−5.6 (21.9)	−5.2 (22.6)	−2.6 (27.3)	1.6 (34.9)	5.4 (41.7)	9.0 (48.2)	11.7 (53.1)	12.2 (54.0)	10.6 (51.1)	6.8 (44.2)	2.5 (36.5)	−2.6 (27.3)	3.7 (38.7)
Record low °C (°F)	−21.0 (−5.8)	−19.0 (−2.2)	−17.5 (0.5)	−10.5 (13.1)	−2.5 (27.5)	0.0 (32.0)	4.5 (40.1)	3.0 (37.4)	−3.0 (26.6)	−5.5 (22.1)	−12.0 (10.4)	−20.0 (−4.0)	−21.0 (−5.8)
Average precipitation mm (inches)	120.8 (4.76)	89.2 (3.51)	123.9 (4.88)	106.2 (4.18)	107.3 (4.22)	95.1 (3.74)	111.4 (4.39)	82.1 (3.23)	99.5 (3.92)	100.2 (3.94)	129.9 (5.11)	117.7 (4.63)	1,283.3 (50.52)
Average rainfall mm (inches)	86.3 (3.40)	69.7 (2.74)	111.3 (4.38)	104.0 (4.09)	107.3 (4.22)	95.1 (3.74)	111.4 (4.39)	82.1 (3.23)	99.5 (3.92)	100.2 (3.94)	125.9 (4.96)	95.5 (3.76)	1,188.3 (46.78)
Average snowfall cm (inches)	34.5 (13.6)	19.5 (7.7)	12.6 (5.0)	2.2 (0.9)	0.0 (0.0)	0.0 (0.0)	0.0 (0.0)	0.0 (0.0)	0.0 (0.0)	0.0 (0.0)	4.1 (1.6)	22.2 (8.7)	95.1 (37.4)
Average precipitation days (≥ 0.2 mm)	15.8	12.8	15.3	17.5	18.3	16.6	17.4	16.8	15.8	17.1	17.6	18.7	199.7
Average rainy days (≥ 0.2 mm)	10.7	8.8	13.0	17.1	18.3	16.6	17.4	16.8	15.8	17.1	16.9	14.3	182.7
Average snowy days (≥ 0.2 cm)	6.8	4.9	3.1	0.83	0.0	0.0	0.0	0.0	0.0	0.0	0.80	5.6	22.0
Mean monthly sunshine hours	78.9	96.2	134.1	145.2	169.8	175.3	192.0	178.4	170.7	141.6	88.7	64.0	1,634.7
Percentage possible sunshine	27.2	32.6	36.3	36.1	37.3	38.0	41.1	41.1	45.4	41.3	30.4	22.9	35.8
Source: Environment Canada

== See also ==
- List of communities in Nova Scotia
