= Baccaro, Nova Scotia =

Community in Canada

Baccaro
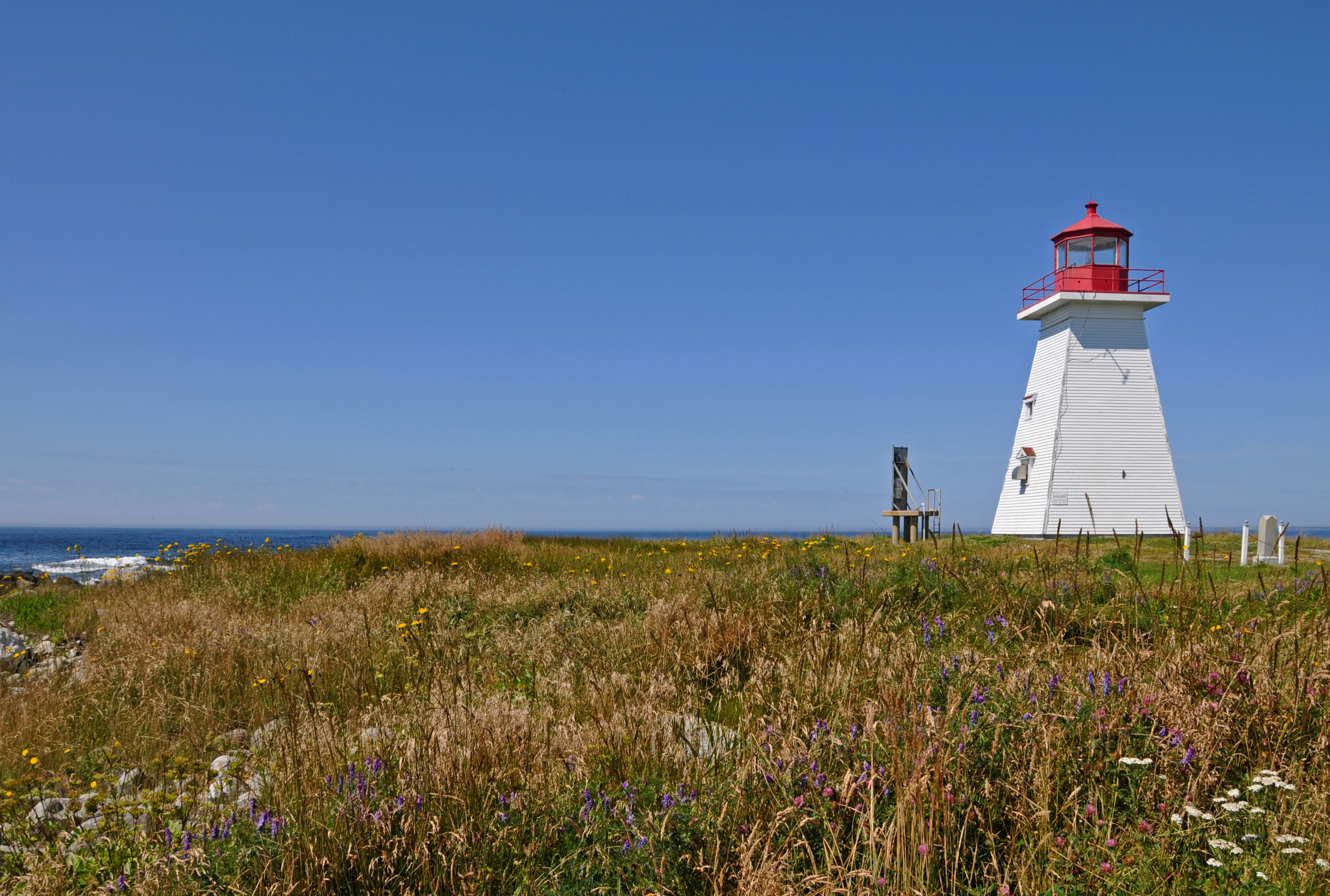
- Baccaro Lighthouse

- Location in Nova Scotia
- Coordinates: 43.479167°N 65.473889°W
- Country: Canada
- Province: Nova Scotia
- County: Shelburne
- Municipal district: Barrington
- Time zone: UTC-4 (AST)
  - Summer (DST): UTC-3 (ADT)
- Postal code(s): B0W 1E0
- Area code: 902

Baccaro (/ˈbækəroʊ/ BAK-ə-roh) is a community in the Canadian province of Nova Scotia, located in the Barrington Municipal District.

The community's name comes from "baccolaos," the Basque word for cod-fish. Baccaro Point has a weather station (Station ID WCP). It is mainland Nova Scotia's southernmost point. There are a few islands, however; such as Cape Sable Island, that are further south.

== See also ==
- List of communities in Nova Scotia
