= Middle Clyde River, Nova Scotia =

Middle Clyde River
- Community
- Location of Middle Clyde River, Nova Scotia
- Coordinates: 43.842222°N 65.517222°W
- Country: Canada
- Province: Nova Scotia
- County: Shelburne
- Municipal district: Barrington
- Time zone: UTC-4 (AST)
  - Summer (DST): UTC-3 (ADT)
- Area code: 902
- Access Routes: Upper Clyde Road via Hwy 103

Middle Clyde River is a community in the Canadian province of Nova Scotia, located in the Municipality of the District of Barrington of Shelburne County.

In 1875, Middle Clyde River had a population of 75, and was the home of "1 church and 3 saw mills".

== See also ==
- List of communities in Nova Scotia
