= Municipality of the District of Barrington =

Barrington
- District municipality
- Municipality of the District of Barrington
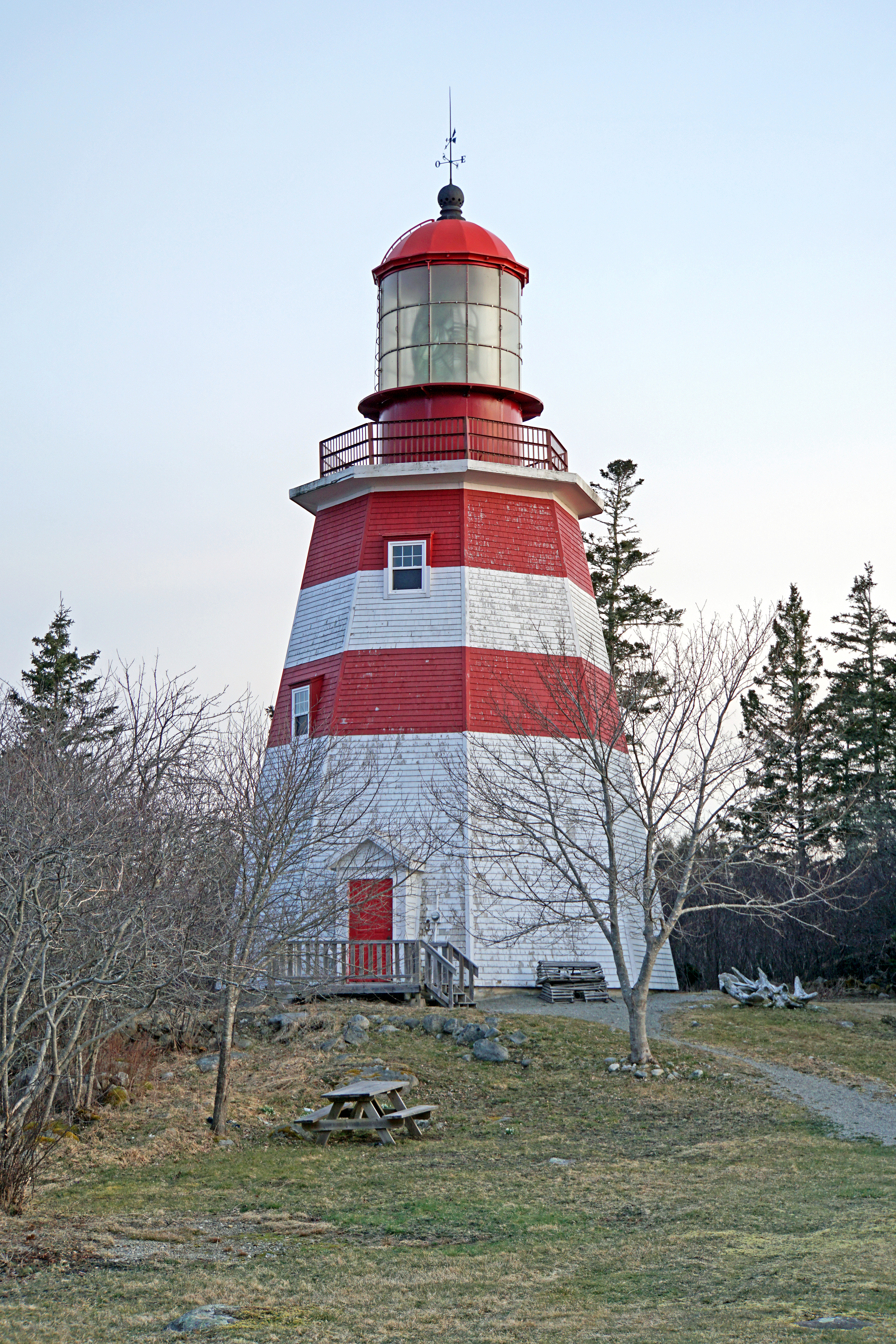
- Seal Island Lighthouse Museum
- Nickname: Lobster Capital of Canada
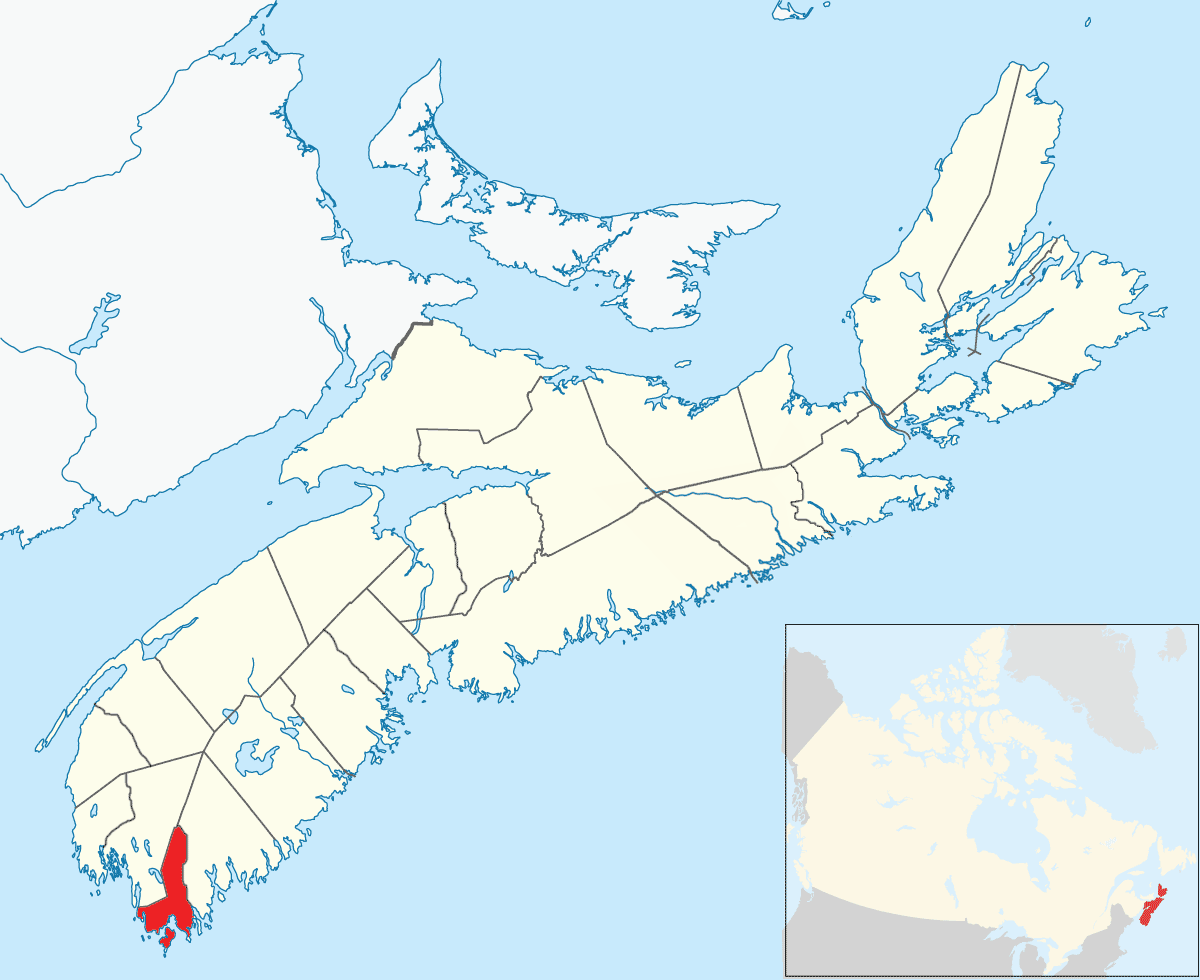
- Location of the Municipality of the District of Barrington
- Coordinates: 43.5646°N 65.563864°W
- Country: Canada
- Province: Nova Scotia
- County: Shelburne
- Incorporated: April 17, 1879
- Electoral Districts Federal: South Shore—St. Margaret's
- Provincial: Shelburne

Government
  - Type: Committee system
  - Warden: Eddie Nickerson

Area
  - Land: 631.98 km^{2} (244.01 sq mi)

Population (2021)
  - Total: 6,523
  - Density: 10.3/km^{2} (27/sq mi)
  - Change 2016-21: ▼1.9%
- Time zone: UTC-4 (AST)
  - Summer (DST): UTC-3 (ADT)
- Postal code(s): B0W 1E0
- Area code: 902
- Dwellings: 3494
- Median household income: $44,541 CDN (2005)
- Access routes: Hwy 103
- Website: Official website

Barrington, officially named the Municipality of the District of Barrington, is a district municipality in western Shelburne County, Nova Scotia, Canada. Statistics Canada classifies the district municipality as a municipal district.

== Geography ==
The Municipality of the District of Barrington forms the southernmost part of the province and contains Cape Sable, the eastern boundary between the North Atlantic Ocean and the Gulf of Maine.

Cape Sable Island is home to the tallest lighthouse in the Maritime Provinces. The Cape Light stands 101 feet tall, located on Canada's most southern saltwater beach, The Hawk Beach.

Acadia University owns Bon Portage Island in the municipality, which is protected by the Nova Scotia Nature Trust; there is a field biology research station present for students to study various local birds.

== Etymology ==
The Mi'kmaq called the area "Ministiguish" or "Ministegkek", meaning "he has gone for it." The Acadians called the area "le Passage", meaning "the Passage". Barrington is named after William Barrington, 2nd Viscount Barrington.

== History ==
=== French settlement ===
Cape Sable and Cape Negro were settled by the Acadians who migrated from Port Royal in 1620. The French governor of Acadia, Charles de la Tour, colonized Cap de Sable giving it the present name, meaning Sandy Cape. La Tour built up a strong post at Cap de Sable (present-day Port La Tour, Nova Scotia) beginning in 1623, called Fort Lomeron in honour of David Lomeron who was his agent in France. (The fur trading post called Fort Lomeron was later renamed Fort La Tour although – erroneously – identified as Fort Saint-Louis in the writings of Samuel de Champlain.) Here he carried on a sizable trade in furs with the Mi'kmaq and farmed the land.

During the Anglo-French War (1627–1629), under Charles I, by 1629 the Kirkes took Quebec City, Sir James Stewart of Killeith, Lord Ochiltree planted a colony on Cape Breton Island at Baleine, and Alexander’s son, William Alexander, 1st Earl of Stirling established the first incarnation of “New Scotland” at Port Royal. This set of British triumphs in what had otherwise been a disastrous war was not destined to last. King Charles’ haste to make peace with France on the terms most beneficial to him meant that the new North American gains would be bargained away in the Treaty of Saint-Germain-en-Laye (1632). There were three battles in Nova Scotia during the colonization of Scots: one at Saint John; another battle at Balene, Cape Breton; and one on Cape Sable (Port La Tour).

==== Siege of 1630 ====
In 1627, as a result of these Scottish victories, Cape Sable was the only major French holding in North America. There was a battle between Charles and his father at Fort St. Louis (See National Historic Site - Fort St. Louis), the latter supporting the Scottish who had taken Port Royal. The battle lasted two days. Claude was forced to withdraw in humiliation to Port Royal.

As a result, La Tour appealed to the King of France for assistance and was appointed lieutenant-general in Acadia in 1631.

By 1641, La Tour lost Cape Sable Island, Pentagouet (Castine, Maine), and Port Royal to Governor of Acadia Charles de Menou d'Aulnay de Charnisay.

La Tour retired to Cap de Sable with his third wife Jeanne Motin, wed in 1653, and died in 1666.

Port La Tour was the site of the first recorded conflict between New England and the Mi'kmaq (see Battle off Port La Tour (1677)).

==== Father Rale's War ====
During Father Rale's War, there were numerous attacks on New England fishing vessels. As an important landfall and base for seasonal New England fishing vessels working the rich fishing banks of Southwestern Nova Scotia, Cape Sable attracted several waves of pirate attacks in the Golden Age of Piracy. Pirates Ned Low and John Phillips raided fishing vessels off Cape Sable and Phillips met his death off the Cape in 1723.

==== Father Le Loutre's War ====
During Father Le Loutre's War there were various naval battles just off shore as the French vessels carried war munitions and supplies from Quebec to the Saint John River for Boishebert at Fort Menagoueche.

==== French and Indian War ====
The British Conquest of Acadia happened in 1710. Over the next forty-five years the Acadians refused to sign an unconditional oath of allegiance to Britain. During this time period Acadians participated in various militia operations against the British and maintained vital supply lines to the French Fortress of Louisbourg and Fort Beausejour. The Acadians and Mi'kmaq from Cape Sable Island raided the Protestants at Lunenburg, Nova Scotia numerous times.

During the French and Indian War, the British sought to neutralize any military threat Acadians posed and to interrupt the vital supply lines Acadians provided to Louisbourg by deporting Acadians from Acadia. In April 1756, Major Preble and his New England troops, on their return to Boston, raided a settlement near Port La Tour and captured 72 men, women, and children.

In the late summer of 1758, the British launched three large offensives against the Acadians. One was the St. John River Campaign, another was the Petitcodiac River Campaign, and the other was against the Acadians at Cape Sable Island. Major Henry Fletcher led the 35th regiment and a company of Joseph Gorham's Rangers to Cape Sable Island. He cordoned off the cape and sent his men through it. One hundred Acadians and Father Jean Baptiste de Gray surrendered, while about 130 Acadians and seven Mi'kmaq escaped. The Acadian prisoners were taken to Georges Island in Halifax Harbour.

=== New England Planters ===
Following the Acadian Expulsion in the 1750s, the area was settled in 1760 by eighty families from Cape Cod and Nantucket, Massachusetts. Cape Sable Island was settled by the New England Planters from Cape Cod and nearby Nantucket Island. The waters off southwestern Nova Scotia had been well known to them since the days of French settlement in the early 17th century. While the tides of the Gulf of Maine may have brought a few exploring fishermen from Nantucket to the island, it was an entirely different tide that spawned the eventual permanent English settlement—a political tide.

Many Cape New Englanders took advantage of the offer of 50 acres (200,000 m^{2}) of land to each male adult who would leave his home and live on those vacated lands in Atlantic Canada. Cape Sable Island was well known to Cape Cod fishermen and they moved north in 1760 to take advantage of a new life. The Cape Sable settlement soon became, and remains today, an important base for inshore fisheries.

Barrington's White inhabitants are mostly descendants of the first settlers from Chatham and Harwich on Cape Cod, Massachusetts who emigrated to the area during the 1760s. One such settler was Solomon Kendrick, father of John Kendrick, explorer and maritime fur trader. Solomon moved from Harwich, Cape Cod, to Barrington in the 1760s.

During the American Revolution, on September 4, 1778, the light infantry company of the 84th Regiment of Foot (Royal Highland Emigrants), under the command of Cpt. Ranald MacKinnon, was in the Raid of Cape Sable Island. American Privateers were threatening Cape Sable Island when the 84th Regiment arrived; they surprised the ship in the night and destroyed it. For his aggressive action, MacKinnon was praised highly by Brigadier General Eyre Massey. In response, one of his friends, Cpt. MacDonald, wrote to Major John Small, "McKinnon was embarrassed by the praise of the General and requested it not be inserted in the record since he only did his duty."

In 1854, Shelburne County was divided into two districts for court sessional purposes - Shelburne and Barrington. In 1879, these districts were incorporated as district municipalities.

Ferry service provided transportation to Cape Sable Island in the early 20th century. A causeway was eventually constructed for pedestrian and automobile traffic, opening on August 5, 1949.

The Shag Harbour UFO incident occurred in the area in 1967, attracting national and international attention.

=== Barrington Lake wildfire ===
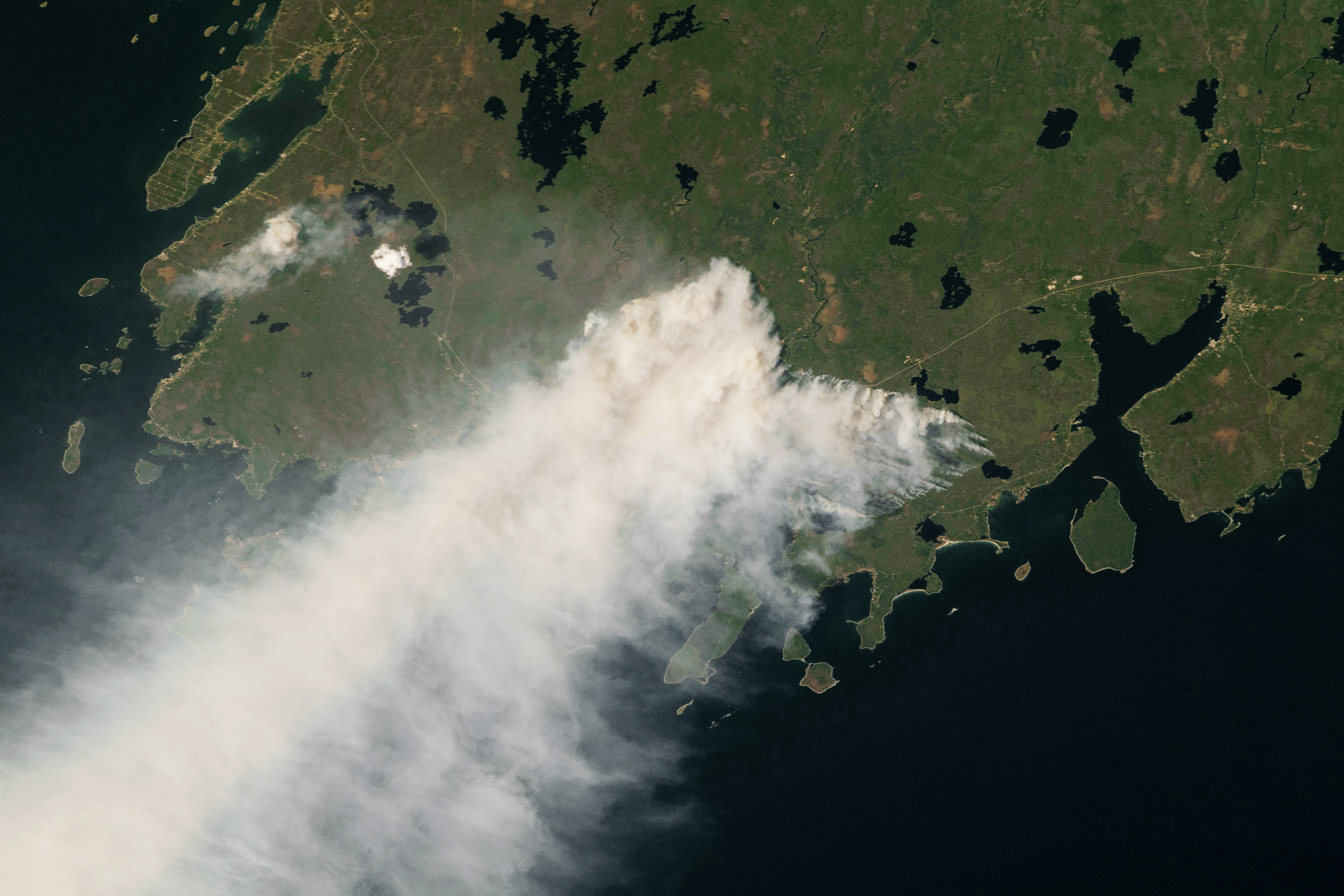
Barrington Lake wildfire on May 29, 2023 (c. 6,000 hectares)

A major wildfire started around May 27, 2023, near Barrington Lake. The fire has burned around 23,015 hectares (56,871 acres) or 230.15 km^{2} as of 2 June 2023. The response to the fire included widespread evacuation orders of the surrounding area, displacing around 5000 people. All schools in Shelburne County were closed in response to the fires. The wildfire is the largest recorded in the history of Nova Scotia.

Efforts to stop the fire included the use of American water bombers and additional firefighters from the U.S. and Costa Rica. On June 7, officials announced it was successfully contained. As of June 7, the fire had destroyed 60 residences and 150 other structures.

== Demographics ==
Historical population
Year	Pop.	±%
1981	7,680	—
1986	7,824	+1.9%
1991	7,774	−0.6%
1996	7,883	+1.4%
2001	7,648	−3.0%
2006	7,331	−4.1%
2011	6,994	−4.6%
2016	6,646	−5.0%
2021	6,523	−1.9%
Source: Statistics Canada:

In the 2021 Canadian census conducted by Statistics Canada, the Municipality of the District of Barrington had a population of 6,523 living in 3,024 of its 3,546 total private dwellings, a change of −1.9% from its 2016 population of 6,646. With a land area of 631.98 km^{2} (244.01 sq mi), it had a population density of 10.3/km^{2} (26.7/sq mi) in 2021.

Mother tongue language (2006)
Language	Population	Pct (%)
English only	7,100	97.33%
Other languages	105	1.44%
French only	90	1.23%

Ethnic Groups (2006)
Ethnic Origin	Population	Pct (%)
Canadian	4,580	62.7%
English	2,800	38.3%
Scottish	1,405	19.2%
Irish	760	10.4%
Métis	670	9.2%
French	475	6.5%
North American Indian	380	5.2%
German	340	4.7%
Dutch (Netherlands)	265	3.6%

== Economy ==
According to the 2016 Canadian census, the working-age population was 61.9% of the total population; the unemployment rate was 11.3% (10.3% among men and 12.7% among women). 89% of people were employees, and 10.1% were self-employed. The average per capita income was $42,496 (median $30,240), with men $57,581 and women $27,629 (medians $44,451 and $21,276, respectively). 39.2% did not have a completed school education, 34.5% had post-secondary education, of which 17.4% had a bachelor's degree or higher, and 20 people had a graduate degree.

== Politics ==
Barrington is in the Shelburne riding for the Nova Scotia House of Assembly. Nolan Young was elected in the 2021 Nova Scotia general election to represent Shelburne as a member of the Progressive Conservative Association of Nova Scotia.

Barrington is in the South Shore—St. Margarets riding for the House of Commons of Canada. Jessica Fancy-Landry MP was elected in the 2025 Canadian federal election to represent South Shore—St. Margarets as a member of the Liberal Party of Canada.

== Education ==
The municipality includes Barrington Municipal High School, a secondary school for grades 7-12.

== Sports ==
The municipality has an indoor hockey rink, Sandy Wickens Memorial Arena, which follows National Hockey League (NHL) specifications.

== Climate ==
Climate data for Barrington, NS
Month	Jan	Feb	Mar	Apr	May	Jun	Jul	Aug	Sep	Oct	Nov	Dec	Year
Record high °C (°F)	13.9 (57.0)	14 (57)	18.3 (64.9)	25.6 (78.1)	31.1 (88.0)	34.5 (94.1)	33.3 (91.9)	36.1 (97.0)	27.8 (82.0)	24.5 (76.1)	20.6 (69.1)	15 (59)	36.1 (97.0)
Mean daily maximum °C (°F)	0.9 (33.6)	1 (34)	5 (41)	10 (50)	15.4 (59.7)	19.9 (67.8)	23.1 (73.6)	23.1 (73.6)	19.3 (66.7)	14.1 (57.4)	9 (48)	4.1 (39.4)	12.1 (53.8)
Daily mean °C (°F)	−3.7 (25.3)	−3.5 (25.7)	0.5 (32.9)	5.2 (41.4)	9.9 (49.8)	14.3 (57.7)	17.6 (63.7)	17.6 (63.7)	13.9 (57.0)	9 (48)	4.6 (40.3)	−0.5 (31.1)	7.1 (44.8)
Mean daily minimum °C (°F)	−8.3 (17.1)	−8 (18)	−4 (25)	0.3 (32.5)	4.4 (39.9)	8.7 (47.7)	12.1 (53.8)	12.1 (53.8)	8.4 (47.1)	3.9 (39.0)	0.2 (32.4)	−5 (23)	2.1 (35.8)
Record low °C (°F)	−22.8 (−9.0)	−23.4 (−10.1)	−24 (−11)	−9.4 (15.1)	−4.4 (24.1)	0.5 (32.9)	3.3 (37.9)	2.4 (36.3)	−3.5 (25.7)	−7.8 (18.0)	−14.3 (6.3)	−24.6 (−12.3)	−24.6 (−12.3)
Average precipitation mm (inches)	151.3 (5.96)	107.3 (4.22)	121.5 (4.78)	123 (4.8)	96.3 (3.79)	102.7 (4.04)	105.6 (4.16)	82.3 (3.24)	101.9 (4.01)	112.5 (4.43)	132.1 (5.20)	156.6 (6.17)	1,393.1 (54.85)
Average rainfall mm (inches)	104.5 (4.11)	75.5 (2.97)	93 (3.7)	115.1 (4.53)	96.2 (3.79)	102.7 (4.04)	105.6 (4.16)	82.3 (3.24)	101.9 (4.01)	110.4 (4.35)	126.4 (4.98)	123.3 (4.85)	1,236.9 (48.70)
Average snowfall cm (inches)	49.6 (19.5)	31.3 (12.3)	26.5 (10.4)	7.4 (2.9)	0.1 (0.0)	0 (0)	0 (0)	0 (0)	0 (0)	2 (0.8)	5.6 (2.2)	31.7 (12.5)	154.2 (60.7)
Source: climate.weatheroffice.ec.gc.ca

== Communities ==
- Atwoods Brook
- Baccaro
- Barrington
- Barrington Passage
- Barrington West
- Bear Point
- Blanche
- Brass Hill
- Cape Sable Island
- Centreville
- Central Woods Harbour
- Charlesville
- Clam Point
- Clark's Harbour
- Coffinscroft
- Crowell
- Doctors Cove
- East Baccaro
- Eel Bay
- Forbes Point
- Lower Clarks Harbour
- Lower Shag Harbour
- Lower Woods Harbour
- Middle Clyde River
- Newellton
- North East Point
- Oak Park
- Port Clyde
- Port La Tour
- Reynoldscroft
- Riverhead
- Shag Harbour
- Sherose Island
- Smithsville
- South Side
- Stoney Island
- The Hawk
- Thomasville
- Upper Port La Tour
- Upper Woods Harbour
- Villagedale
- West Baccaro
- West Head

== Access routes ==
Highways and numbered routes that run through the district municipality, including external routes that start or finish at the municipal boundary:

- Highways
  - Hwy 103
- Trunk Routes
  - Trunk 3
- Collector Routes:
  - Route 309
  - Route 330
- External Routes:
  - None

== See also ==
- List of municipalities in Nova Scotia
