= Baccaro =

Baccaro may refer to:

- Baccaro, Nova Scotia, a community in Nova Scotia, Canada

== People with the surname ==
- Leandro Baccaro (born 1973), Argentine field hockey player
- Salvatore Baccaro (1944–1984), Italian actor

== See also ==
- East Baccaro, Nova Scotia, a community in Nova Scotia, Canada
- West Baccaro, Nova Scotia, a community in Nova Scotia, Canada
