= Brass Hill, Nova Scotia =

Brass Hill
- Community
- Location of Brass Hill, Nova Scotia
- Coordinates: 43.5525°N 65.600833°W
- Country: Canada
- Province: Nova Scotia
- County: Shelburne
- Municipal district: Barrington
- Time zone: UTC-4 (AST)
  - Summer (DST): UTC-3 (ADT)
- Area code: 902
- Access Routes: Trunk 3

Brass Hill is a community in the Canadian province of Nova Scotia, located in the Municipality of the District of Barrington of Shelburne County.

== History ==
A Black man named Brass lived in the area in the 1760s. Brass Hill was the site of the Barrington Poor Farm, opened in September 1887.

== See also ==
- List of communities in Nova Scotia
