= Forbes Point, Nova Scotia =

Forbes Point
- Community
- Location of Forbes Point, Nova Scotia
- Coordinates: 43.55°N 65.748611°W
- Country: Canada
- Province: Nova Scotia
- County: Shelburne
- Municipal district: Barrington
- Time zone: UTC-4 (AST)
  - Summer (DST): UTC-3 (ADT)
- Area code: 902
- Access Routes: Forbes Point Road via Trunk 3

Local scenery in Forbes Point.

Cape Island style boats at the wharf

Forbes Point is a small community on the southwestern shore of the Canadian province of Nova Scotia, located in the Municipality of the District of Barrington of Shelburne County.

== History ==
Forbes Point was named after Alexander Forbes, who settled the area in the late 18th century. Stone walls from his homestead can still be found in the area. There is a small Forbes family grave site located in the woods of Forbes Point.

== Geography ==
Forbes Point is located at N43°33.00, W65°44.55. It is bordered on three sides by the Atlantic Ocean. Much of the landscape is spruce trees and swamp.

== Demographics ==
As of 2006, there were approximately 100 people and 35 households. The population density is estimated to be 0.4 people /km². Many current inhabitants of Forbes Point can claim direct descent from Alexander Forbes.

== Economy ==
There is a small wharf and fish processing plant at the end of Forbes Point. Most residents make a living in the lobster fishery.

== Recreation ==
There are a few ponds, which provide excellent grounds for catching frogs in the summer, and ice skating in the winter.

The ocean provides a refreshing place to go swimming in the summertime.

== See also ==
- List of communities in Nova Scotia
