= Woods Harbour, Nova Scotia =

- Community
- Location of Woods Harbour, Nova Scotia
- Coordinates: 43.541389°N 65.733333°W
- Country: Canada
- Province: Nova Scotia
- County: Shelburne
- Municipal district: Barrington

Government
  - Type: Municipal Council
  - Warden: Eddie Nickerson
- Time zone: UTC-4 (AST)
  - Summer (DST): UTC-3 (ADT)
- Area code: 902
- Access Routes: Trunk 3

Woods Harbour is a community in the Canadian province of Nova Scotia, located in the Barrington municipal district of Shelburne County.

The number of residents is around 1227.

The Mi'kmaq name for the area was Cockouquit, which was a word for duck. Cockerwit Passage, leading into the harbour, retains a version of the name.

== See also ==
- List of communities in Nova Scotia
