= Oak Park, Nova Scotia =

Oak Park
- Community
- Location of Oak Park, Nova Scotia
- Coordinates: 43.589167°N 65.635°W
- Country: Canada
- Province: Nova Scotia
- County: Shelburne
- Municipal district: Barrington
- Time zone: UTC-4 (AST)
  - Summer (DST): UTC-3 (ADT)
- Area code: 902
- Access Routes: Oak Park Road via Hwy 103

Oak Park is a community in the Canadian province of Nova Scotia, located in the Municipality of the District of Barrington of Shelburne County.

Barrington Municipal High School is there. Formerly the road was Highway 3, but since then a new bypass was built for Highway 103, with Exit 30 near the head of the road.

== See also ==
- List of communities in Nova Scotia
