= Eel Bay, Nova Scotia =

Eel Bay Cape Negro until 2023
- Community
- Location of Eel Bay, Nova Scotia
- Coordinates: 43.5525°N 65.4425°W
- Country: Canada
- Province: Nova Scotia
- County: Shelburne
- Municipal district: Barrington
- Time zone: UTC-4 (AST)
  - Summer (DST): UTC-3 (ADT)
- Area code: 902
- Access Routes: Route 309

Eel Bay, previously known as Cape Negro, is a community in the Canadian province of Nova Scotia, located in the Municipality of the District of Barrington of Shelburne County. Cape Sable, Nova Scotia By one account, Eel Bay was first settled by the French who migrated from Port Royal in 1620. However other records indicate the habitation and garden of a French Priest at the Hawl Over (or Haulover) in Eel Bay as early as 1635, and the 1671 French census records the family of Amand and Elizabeth Lalloue living in Eel Bay.

== History ==
The cape was named by Samuel de Champlain, who wrote in 1604: "There is a harbour very good for vessels, and the head of it has a little river, which runs from a distance inland, which I named the port Cape Negro, on account of a rock which at a distance resembles one, four leagues from it and four from Port Mouton. The cape is very dangerous on account of the rocks."

The first mention of permanent European habitation was that of a French Priest in 1635. What remains of the 1671 French census indicates a family of seven (Amand Lalloue) living in Eel Bay, with a farm which included grain, peas and other vegetables as well as sizeable herds of goats and pigs. Several Mi'kmaq families with children lived in Eel Bay, at least during the summer.

Practically all of the Acadians were expelled by the English / New England military forces by 1758, and the New England Planters began to settle the formerly Acadian farmland by 1760–1761. The earliest New England Planters in Eel Bay were: Peleg Coffin, Sacco Barnes, Timothy Bryant, Samuel Knowles.

Although there was at one time a Cape Negro school and community hall, all that remains today are the Cape Negro Church (current building built 1853) and adjacent cemeteries (Seaview Cemetery, 1770. Hillside Cemetery, 1958). The remnants of the canal built at the Hawl Over also remain. The Cape Negro Church has the distinction of having Freeborn Garrettson as one of its first ministers.

== Name change ==
Named in or before 1604 after a black rock formation, the Middle French Cap Negre meaning Cape Black predates North American African Slavery by at least fifteen years.

Nevertheless, in late 2016, an application was made to Nova Scotia Geographic Information Service to rename Cape Negro (and Cape Negro Island, Negro Harbour, Squaw Island). The change was awaiting Indigenous and community support.

The community itself was officially renamed on February 8, 2023, to Eel Bay. The name was selected by local residents. Name changes for the harbour, the island and the actual cape remain subject to consultation.

== See also ==
- List of communities in Nova Scotia
