= Barrington Municipal High School =

Coordinates: 43.58013°N 65.615399°W

Location
- 536 Oak Park Road; Barrington Passage, Nova Scotia; Canada

Information
- Type: Secondary school
- Established: 1958
- Principal: Cathy Breen
- Grades: 7-12
- Colors: Red and Grey
- Mascot: Baron
- Website: http://www.bmhs.ednet.ns.ca/

Barrington Municipal High School (BMHS) is a secondary school located in Oak Park, Nova Scotia. BMHS is part of the Tri-County Regional School Board and is the only high school in the Municipality of the District of Barrington. The school was opened on October 30, 2006 by Education Minister Karen Casey. The school replaced the Barrington High School in Barrington Passage, which was torn down due to environmental issues.

== Administration ==
- Cathy Breen - Principal
