= Doctors Cove, Nova Scotia =

Canadian community in Nova Scotia

Doctors Cove
- Community
- Location of Doctors Cove, Nova Scotia
- Coordinates: 43.516111°N 65.632778°W
- Country: Canada
- Province: Nova Scotia
- County: Shelburne
- Municipal district: Barrington
- Time zone: UTC-4 (AST)
  - Summer (DST): UTC-3 (ADT)
- Area code: 902
- Access Routes: Trunk 3

Doctors Cove is a community in the Canadian province of Nova Scotia, located in the Municipality of the District of Barrington of Shelburne County.

== See also ==
- List of communities in Nova Scotia
