= List of shipwrecks in February 1843 =

The list of shipwrecks in February 1843 includes ships sunk, foundered, wrecked, grounded, or otherwise lost during February 1843.

== 1 February ==
List of shipwrecks: 1 February 1843
Ship	State	Description
Alexander	United Kingdom	The ship was driven ashore in Morecambe Bay. She was on a voyage from Mobile, Alabama, United States to Liverpool, Lancashire. She was refloated the next day and towed into Glasson Dock, Lancashire.
Algonquin	United Kingdom	The ship was wrecked on Beaks Key. She was on a voyage from Mobile, Alabama, United States to Liverpool.
Broad Oak	United Kingdom	The ship was driven ashore at Liverpool. She was on a voyage from Liverpool to Bahia, Brazil. She was refloated on 7 February and resumed her voyage.
Brothers	(United Kingdom of Great Britain and Ireland) New South Wales	The ship capsized and sank in a squall. Her crew were rescued. She was on a voyage from Port Nicholson to Akaroa, New Zealand.
Chevalier	United Kingdom	The barque was driven ashore and wrecked at "Rennoe" with the loss of at least nine lives.
Childe Harold	United Kingdom	The ship was driven ashore at Blyth, Northumberland. She was on a voyage from Newcastle upon Tyne, Northumberland to Aberdeen. She was refloated and resumed her voyage.
Finish	United Kingdom	The ship was driven ashore and capsized at Grangemouth, Stirlingshire.
Lively	United Kingdom	The ship ran aground in the Castletown River. She was on a voyage from Dundalk, County Louth to Liverpool.
Margaret	United Kingdom	The ship departed from South Shields, County Durham for Inverness. Presumed subsequently foundered with the loss of all hands, a boat came ashore at Blyth, Northumberland.
Nancy	(United Kingdom of Great Britain and Ireland) New South Wales	The schooner was wrecked at the mouth of the Macleay River.
Shamrock	(United Kingdom of Great Britain and Ireland) New South Wales	The steamship ran aground and was wrecked in Moreton Bay. All on board survived.
Wilberforce	United Kingdom	The ship was wrecked at Maranhão, Brazil. She was on a voyage from Liverpool to Maranhão.

== 2 February ==
List of shipwrecks: 2 February 1843
Ship	State	Description
Cupido	Papal States	The ship departed from Torrevecchia Teatina for Riga, Russia. No further trace, presumed foundered with the loss of all hands.
Elizabeth	United Kingdom	The ship was driven ashore and wrecked near Sydney, Nova Scotia, British North America. She was on a voyage from Sydney to a British port.
Hero	United Kingdom	The ship was driven ashore at Milford Haven, Pembrokeshire. She was refloated on 5 February.
Liberty	United Kingdom	The ship was wrecked on the north coast of Suffolk with the loss of all four crew.
Lively	United Kingdom	The ship ran aground in the Castletown River. She was on a voyage from Dundalk, County Louth to Liverpool, Lancashire.
Louise and Elise	Hamburg	The ship ran aground on the Colorado Reef. She was on a voyage from Comarca Lagunera, Mexico to Hamburg. She was refloated on 5 February and put into Havana, Cuba, where she arrived on 16 February.
Volant	United Kingdom	The ship was wrecked at Dunkeechen, County Mayo with the loss of all hands. She was on a voyage from the Clyde to Saint Thomas, Virgin Islands.

== 3 February ==
List of shipwrecks: 3 February 1843
Ship	State	Description
Agnes Lea	United Kingdom	The ship capsized at South Shields, County Durham. She was righted and beached. She was refloated on 16 February and taken into South Shields for repairs.
Bolina	United Kingdom	The brig was driven ashore on Clea Ness, Lincolnshire She was on a voyage from London to Sunderland, County Durham. She was refloated and taken into Grimsby.
Ceres	United Kingdom	The ship was driven ashore in Widewall Bay, Orkney Islands.
Ceres	United Kingdom	The barque was driven ashore at Cleethorpes, Lincolnshire. She was on a voyage from Cowes, Isle of Wight to Sunderland. Ceres was refloated and taken into Grimsby.
City of Hamburg	United Kingdom	The paddle steamer was driven ashore on the Jarrow Slake. She was on a voyage from South Shields to London.
Elizabeth	United Kingdom	The ship was driven ashore at Whitby, Yorkshire. She was refloated on 18 February and taken into Whitby.
Elizabeth	United Kingdom	The schooner capsized in the North Sea with the loss of a crew member.
Henry and Mary	United Kingdom	The ship was driven ashore and severely damaged at St. Margaret's Hope, Orkney Islands.
Indian	United Kingdom	The ship capsized at South Shields and was severely damaged. She was on a voyage from South Shields to London. She was subsequently repaired.
Judith	(United Kingdom of Great Britain and Ireland) Jersey	The ship was driven ashore at South Shields.
Laurel	United Kingdom	The ship departed from Arbroath, Forfarshire for London. No further trace, presumed foundered with the loss of all hands.
Liberty	United Kingdom	The schooner was driven ashore near Saltburn-by-the-Sea, Yorkshire with the loss of five of her six crew.
P. J. Nugent	United Kingdom	The sloop was driven ashore and wrecked at Rhyl, Denbighshire. She was on a voyage from Newry, County Antrim to Runcorn, Cheshire.
Rob Roy	United Kingdom	The pilot boat foundered off Portlooe, Cornwall with the loss of both crew.
Salus	United Kingdom	The ship was driven ashore and wrecked on Inishtrahull with the loss of all on board. She was on a voyage from the Clyde to Demerara, British Honduras.
Sara Anna Cornelia	Netherlands	The ship was driven ashore at Littlehampton, Sussex, United Kingdom. She was on a voyage from Bordeaux, Gironde, France to Rotterdam, South Holland. She was refloated and taken into Littlehampton.
Scotland	(United Kingdom of Great Britain and Ireland) British North America	The full-rigged ship was driven ashore and wrecked at the mouth of the "Guaydore River", County Donegal, Ireland. Her crew were rescued. She was on a voyage from Liverpool, Lancashire to Charleston, South Carolina, United States.
Thomas	United Kingdom	The brig foundered off Skomer, Pembrokeshire with the loss of all seven crew.
Union	United Kingdom	The ship was driven ashore at Grimsby.
William and Ann	United Kingdom	The collier, a brig was driven ashore and wrecked at Robin Hoods Bay, Yorkshire with the loss of all six crew and six lifeboatmen.
William and Jane	United Kingdom	The ship was driven ashore at Harbour Cove, Cornwall.

== 4 February ==
List of shipwrecks: 4 February 1843
Ship	State	Description
Aurora	United Kingdom	The ship was driven ashore at Grantown-on-Spey, Morayshire.
Belt	United Kingdom	The ship was driven ashore north of Caister-on-Sea, Norfolk.
Blucher	United Kingdom	The brig was driven ashore and wrecked at Newbiggin-by-the-Sea, Northumberland with the loss of four of her seven crew. She was on a voyage from London to Warkworth, Northumberland.
Brilliant	United Kingdom	The ship was wrecked on The Skerries, in the Irish Sea off the coast of County Antrim.
Catherine	United Kingdom	The schooner was run ashore east of Whitstable, Kent.
Chatty or Chertsey	United Kingdom	The brig foundered in the North Sea off Bridlington, Yorkshire with the loss of all hands.
Daphne	United Kingdom	The ship was wrecked in Cheval Bay. All on board were rescued. She was on a voyage from Exeter, Devon to Saint-Malo, Ille-et-Vilaine, France.
Duke of Clarence	United Kingdom	The ship was driven ashore at Great Yarmouth, Norfolk.
Envy	(United Kingdom of Great Britain and Ireland) Gibraltar	The ship was driven ashore and wrecked at Oran, Algeria. Her crew were rescued. She was on a voyage from Gibraltar to Oran.
Helen	United Kingdom	The ship capsized off Blyth, Northumberland.
Hercules	France	The ship was wrecked in the Petit-Rhône, She was on a voyage from Marseille, Bouches-du-Rhône to Cette, Hérault.
Jane	United Kingdom	The brig was driven ashore at Margate, Kent.
Jemima	United Kingdom	The ship was abandoned in Belfast Lough. She was on a voyage from Liverpool to Tampico, Florida Territory. She was subsequently boarded by a pilot and taken into Belfast, County Antrim.
Joan	United Kingdom	The schooner was driven ashore and wrecked south of Ramsey, Isle of Man. Her crew were rescued. She was on a voyage from Newry, County Antrim to Preston, Lancashire.
Johns	United Kingdom	The ship was driven ashore at Ramsey. She was refloated and taken into Ramsey.
John Thomas	United Kingdom	The ship was driven ashore at Leith, Lothian. She was on a voyage from Antwerp, Belgium to Inverkeithing, Fife.
Lawrence	United Kingdom	The ship was driven ashore at Sheringham, Norfolk.
Leeds	United Kingdom	The ship was driven ashore at Winterton-on-Sea, Norfolk with the loss of a crew member. She was on a voyage from South Shields, County Durham to London.
Liberty	United Kingdom	The brig was driven ashore near Saltburn-by-the-Sea, Yorkshire with the loss of all but one of her six crew. She was on a voyage from King's Lynn, Norfolk to Sunderland, County Durham.
Margaret	United Kingdom	The ship was driven ashore at Cley-next-the-Sea, Norfolk. Her crew were rescued. She was on a voyage from Warkworth to London.
Mary and Isabella	United Kingdom	The ship, a brig or smack, was driven ashore and wrecked at Findon, Aberdeenshire with the loss of four lives. She was on a voyage from Wick, Caithness to Leith, Lothian
Pansey	United Kingdom	The sloop was driven ashore between Mablethorpe and Trusthorpe, Lincolnshire. Her crew were rescued. She was on a voyage from Wisbech, Cambridgeshire to Hull, Yorkshire.
Rochester Castle	United Kingdom	The crewless brig or schooner was driven ashore and wrecked at Blyth, Northumberland.
Rolina	United Kingdom	The ship was driven ashore near Cleethorpes, Lincolnshire. She was refloated and taken into Grimsby.
Swift	United Kingdom	The ship was driven ashore at Lindisfarne. Her crew were rescued.
Thomas	United Kingdom	The brig was driven ashore near Staithes, Yorkshire. Her crew were rescued.
Two Sisters	United Kingdom	The ship was abandoned in the North Sea off Cromer, Norfolk. Her crew were rescued.

== 5 February ==
List of shipwrecks: 5 February 1843
Ship	State	Description
Amanda	United Kingdom	The ship departed from Dartmouth, Devon for Seville, Spain. No further trace, presumed foundered with the loss of all hands.
Ann	United Kingdom	The brig was driven ashore and wrecked at Cayeux-sur-Mer, Somme, France. All ten people on board were rescued. She was on a voyage from Trinidad to London.
Aust	United Kingdom	The ship struck a rock and sank in the English Channel off Beachy Head, Sussex. Her crew were rescued.
Catherine	United Kingdom	The ship was driven ashore near Whitstable, Kent.
Helen Marie	United Kingdom	The ship was driven ashore at Spurn Point, Yorkshire and capsized with the loss of five of her crew.
Jane	United Kingdom	The brig was driven ashore at Margate, Kent.
Jane Lockhart	United Kingdom	The ship ran aground, capsized and sank at Cowes, Isle of Wight. She was raised and refloated.
Jessie Ann	United Kingdom	The ship ran aground of the Herd Sand, in the North Sea off the coast of County Durham. She was refloated on 12 February.
Larkins	United Kingdom	The East Indiaman was driven onto the Walpole Rock, Margate. She was on a voyage from China to London. She was refloated between 10 and 13 February.
Leocadie	France	The ship was driven ashore at "Lavredo", Spain. She was on a voyage from Gijón, to Adra, Spain.
Margaret	United Kingdom	The ship was driven ashore at Cley-next-the-Sea, Norfolk. Her crew were rescued. She was on a voyage from Warkworth, Northumberland to London.
Mary Garde	United Kingdom	The ship was driven ashore at Margate. She was on a voyage from Cork to London.
Minerva	Sweden	The ship was driven ashore at Cowes, Isle of Wight, United Kingdom. She was on a voyage from Sweden to Barcelona, Spain. She was refloated the next day and taken into Cowes.
Norma	United Kingdom	The ship was driven ashore at Yarmouth, Isle of Wight. She was on a voyage from London to Tobago. She was refloated the next day and taken into Lymington, Hampshire.
Reliance	United Kingdom	The ship was driven out to sea from Bridlington, East Riding of Yorkshire. She came ashore and wrecked at Cowden, Yorkshire. Her crew were rescued.
Rival	United Kingdom	The ship was driven ashore at Cowes. She was refloated the next day and taken into Cowes.
Sisters	United Kingdom	The ship ran aground in The Wash and sank. Her crew were rescued. She was on a voyage from Sunderland, County Durham to King's Lynn, Norfolk.
Two Friends	United Kingdom	The ship was driven ashore at Lowestoft, Suffolk. Her crew were rescued.
Union	United Kingdom	The ship was driven ashore at Grimsby.

== 6 February ==
List of shipwrecks: 6 February 1843
Ship	State	Description
Anne	United Kingdom	The ship was driven ashore at Saint-Valery-sur-Somme, Somme, France. Her crew were rescued. She was on a voyage from Trinidad to London.
Anne	United Kingdom	The ship was driven ashore and wrecked at North Somercotes, Lincolnshire. Her crew were rescued. She was on a voyage from Newcastle upon Tyne, Northumberland to the Humber.
Betsey	United Kingdom	The ship was driven ashore and wrecked at Theddlethorpe, Lincolnshire with the loss of all hands.
Brilliante	Flag unknown	The ship was wrecked at "Porto Oliveto".
Clements	United Kingdom	The ship was driven ashore and severely damaged at Doctors Cove, Nova Scotia, British North America. She was on a voyage from Saint Andrews, New Brunswick, British North America to Demerara, British Honduras.
Diadem	United Kingdom	The ship was wrecked on the Herd Sand, in the North Sea off the coast of County Durham. Her crew were rescued. She was on a voyage from South Shields, County Durham to Marseille, Bouches-du-Rhône, France.
Eagle	United Kingdom	The ship struck a sunken rock and sank near Pole Head, Newfoundland, British North America. Her crew were rescued. She was on a voyage from Cádiz, Spain to St. John's, Newfoundland.
Eliza Russel	United Kingdom	The ship was wrecked on a reef 70 nautical miles (130 km) off Cárdenas, Cuba.
Emily	United Kingdom	The ship was wrecked on the Black Middens, in the North Sea off the coast of County Durham. Her crew were rescued. She was on a voyage from Copenhagen, Denmark to South Shields.
Fame	United Kingdom	The ship ran aground on the Herd Sand. Her crew were rescued. She was on a voyage from Perth to London. Fame had become a wreck by 22 February.
Gazelle	France	The ship was driven ashore near Boulogne. Her crew were rescued.
Jean Marie	France	The ship was wrecked on the Cornet Rocks, Channel Islands. She was on a voyage from Rouen, Seine-Inférieure to Bordeaux, Gironde.
Jessie Ann	United Kingdom	The ship ran aground on the Herd Sand.
Lady Sarah Maitland	United Kingdom	The ship was struck a rock and was damaged at Upper Prospect Harbour, Nova Scotia. She was on a voyage from Jamaica to Halifax, Nova Scotia. She was refloated.
Minerva	France	The ship ran aground at Boulogne.
Victoire d'Intel	France	The ship struck the Becel Lau Rocks and sank. Her crew were rescued. She was on a voyage from Pont-l'Abbé, Finistère to Bordeaux, Gironde.
Victoria	United Kingdom	The ship was wrecked near Peniche, Portugal. She was on a voyage from Le Tréport, Seine-Inférieure to Peniche, Portugal.

== 7 February ==
List of shipwrecks: 7 February 1843
Ship	State	Description
Ann	United Kingdom	The ship was driven ashore between Cockenzie and Prestonpans, Lothian. Her crew were rescued.
Betsy	United Kingdom	The ship was driven ashore at Theddlethorpe, Lincolnshire with the loss of all hands.
Dorothea	United Kingdom	The ship ran aground at Portmadoc, Caernarvonshire.
Freeman	United Kingdom	The ship was wrecked on the Cross Sand, in the North Sea off the coast of Norfolk.
Friendship	United Kingdom	The schooner foundered off Ilfracombe, Devon. Her crew were rescued.
Goldfinch	United Kingdom	The ship was driven ashore at Middlesbrough, North Riding of Yorkshire.
Helen Stuart	United Kingdom	The ship was wrecked on the coast of Lincolnshire with the loss of three of her crew. She was on a voyage from Liverpool, Lancashire to Hull, Yorkshire.
Malvina	United Kingdom	The ship foundered in the North Sea off Caister-on-Sea, Norfolk.
North America	United Kingdom	The ship was driven ashore in the Shrewsbury River, New Jersey, United States. She was on a voyage from Liverpool, Lancashire to New York.
Rob Roy	United Kingdom	The ship was driven ashore and wrecked at Newbiggin-by-the-Sea, Northumberland with the loss of all hands.
Romeo	United Kingdom	The barque was driven ashore on St. Patrick's Island, County Dublin. She was on a voyage from Calcutta, India to Greenock, Renfrewshire. She was later refloated and taken into port. but subsequently became a wreck.
Stokesly	United Kingdom	The ship was driven ashore at Middlesbrough. She was refloated.
Thomas	United Kingdom	The ship was wrecked near South Shields, County Durham. Her crew were rescued.
Thomaston	United Kingdom	The ship was driven ashore on "The Jarrow", County Durham.
Two Brothers	United Kingdom	The ship was driven ashore between Cockenzie and Prestonpans. Her crew were rescued.
William Donaldson	United Kingdom	The ship capsized in the Hate with the loss of all but one of her crew.

== 8 February ==
List of shipwrecks: 8 February 1843
Ship	State	Description
Eagle	United Kingdom	The ship struck on a sunken rock and sank, Her crew were rescued. She was on a voyage from Cádiz, Spain to Saint John's, Newfoundland, British North America.
Hope	United Kingdom	The ship ran aground in the River Orwell.
Jonge Louis	France	The galiot was driven ashore in the Bay of Grand Rosaire.
Lady Macnaghten	United Kingdom	The ship was driven ashore at Margate, Kent. She was on a voyage from Calcutta, India to London. She was refloated.
Margaretta	United Kingdom	The sloop was wrecked at Pwllheli, Caernarfonshire. Her three crew were rescued by a lifeboat.
Mary	United Kingdom	The ship was driven ashore at Margate. She was on a voyage from Cork to London.
Native	United Kingdom	The schooner was plundered and sunk in the English Channel 12 nautical miles (22 km) east south east of Durlestone Head, Dorset. Her crew were rescued. She was on a voyage from London to Limerick. Her captain and mate were subsequently committed for trial in London.
Niewland	Netherlands	The ship was driven ashore at Ramsgate, Kent. She was on a voyage from Rotterdam, South Holland to Padang, Netherlands East Indies. She was refloated and taken into Ramsgate in a leaky condition.
Pero	United Kingdom	The ship foundered off the north coast of Cornwall.

== 9 February ==
List of shipwrecks: 9 February 1843
Ship	State	Description
Den Godensight or Gode Hensight	Norway	The ship departed from Mandahl for Wick, Caithness, United Kingdom. No further trace, presumed foundered with the loss of all hands.
Happy Return	United Kingdom	The ship was in collision with Ruby (United Kingdom) and foundered with the loss of all hands off the north coast of Cornwall.
Hesperus	United Kingdom	The ship ran aground on the Herd Sand, in the North Sea off the coast of County Durham. She was on a voyage from South Shields to Marseille, Bouches-du-Rhône, France. Hesperus was refloated and beached at South Shields.
Lady of the Lake	United Kingdom	The ship was foundered in the North Sea off the coast of Yorkshire.
Prince Albert	United Kingdom	The ship was driven ashore and wrecked at "Pubrico", Nova Scotia, British North America. She was on a voyage from Saint John, New Brunswick, British North America to London.
Robert	(United Kingdom of Great Britain and Ireland) Grenada	The sloop was wrecked off Gouyave. Her crew were rescued.
Rose in June	United Kingdom	The ship was wrecked on Puffin Island, Anglesey with the loss of all hands.
Teseo	Kingdom of the Two Sicilies	The ship capsized at Ramsgate, Kent. She was on a voyage from London to Naples, Kingdom of the Two Sicilies.

== 10 February ==
List of shipwrecks: 10 February 1843
Ship	State	Description
Argyll	United Kingdom	The ship was driven ashore at "Ribbswall". She was on a voyage from Inverary, Argyllshire to Malahide, County Dublin.
Le Jeune Françoise	France	The ship was abandoned in the Atlantic Ocean 80 nautical miles (150 km) off Ouessant, Finistère. Her crew were rescued by Lady Mary Wood (United Kingdom). Le Jeune Françoise was on a voyage from Granville, Manche to Le Croisic, Loire Atlantique.
Neptune	United Kingdom	The paddle steamer ran aground in the Elbe. She was on a voyage from London to Hamburg.
Prince Albert	United Kingdom	The ship ran aground off the Tusket Islands, British North America. She was on a voyage from Yarmouth, Nova Scotia, British North America to Liverpool, Lancashire. She was consequently beached at Pubnico Point, Newfoundland, British North America.
Sir John St. Aubyn; Sophia	United Kingdom (United Kingdom of Great Britain and Ireland) Cape Colony	The paddle steamer Sir John St. Aubyn was towing Sophia out of Cape Town when the tow rope broke. Both vessels were driven ashore; Sophia was wrecked. Sir John St. Aubyn was also reported to have been wrecked.

== 11 February ==
List of shipwrecks: 11 February 1843
Ship	State	Description
Cornubia	United Kingdom	The ship was wrecked near the "Atacalema Lighthouse". Her crew were rescued. She was on a voyage from Liverpool, Lancashire to an American port.
Eggardon Castle	United Kingdom	The ship was wrecked near Bastia, Corsica, France. She was on a voyage from Livorno, Grand Duchy of Tuscany to Bastia.
Elbe	France	The steamship was driven ashore at Mostaganem, Algeria. She was on a voyage from Algiers, Algeria to Gibraltar. She had been refloated by 14 February and resumed her voyage.
Harmony	United Kingdom	The ship was driven ashore near Bridlington, Yorkshire.

== 12 February ==
List of shipwrecks: 12 February 1843
Ship	State	Description
Bury	United Kingdom	The ship was driven onto the Runnel Stone.
Calla	United Kingdom	The ship was driven ashore at Exeter, Devon. She was refloated and taken into Exeter.
Content	United Kingdom	The ship was abandoned whilst on a voyage from Liverpool, Lancashire to a French port. Her crew were rescued by Dolphin (United States).
Emma	United Kingdom	The ship was driven ashore at St. Ives, Cornwall. She was on a voyage from Newport, Monmouthshire to Plymouth, Devon.

== 14 February ==
List of shipwrecks: 14 February 1843
Ship	State	Description
Æos	Prussia	The ship was driven ashore on the Binnen Westergrund. She was on a voyage from Çeşme, Ottoman Empire to Swinemünde. She was refloated the next day and taken into Swinemünde.
Hull Packet	United Kingdom	The ship ran aground off Wainfleet, Lincolnshire. She was on a voyage from Blakeney, Norfolk to Hull, Yorkshire. She was refloated and taken into Boston, Lincolnshire in a leaky condition.

== 15 February ==
List of shipwrecks: 15 February 1843
Ship	State	Description
Aigle	France	The ship was driven ashore and wrecked on Faial Island, Azores. She was on a voyage from Guadeloupe to Havre de Grâce, Seine Maritime.
Aymontimo	Spain	The ship was driven ashore and wrecked at Havana, Cuba, She was on a voyage from Cádiz to Havana.
Herman Willem	Netherlands	The ship ran aground on the Kramenton, in the Wadden Sea. She was refloated and put into Terschelling, Friesland. She was on a voyage from Amsterdam, North Holland to Hamburg.
Poland	United Kingdom	The ship was driven ashore at Langstone, Hampshire. She was on a voyage from Seaham, County Durham to Emsworth, Hampshire. She was refloated on 16 February and taken into Langstone.
Sisters	United Kingdom	The ship was driven ashore at Great Yarmouth, Norfolk. She was on a voyage from Goole, Yorkshire to London. She was refloated on 17 February and taken into Great Yarmouth.

== 16 February ==
List of shipwrecks: 16 February 1843
Ship	State	Description
Clarence	(United Kingdom of Great Britain and Ireland) Van Diemen's Land	The ship was destroyed by fire at Hobart.
Kandiana	India	The ship was driven into HMRC Bee ( Board of Customs) and then driven ashore at South Shields, County Durham, United Kingdom. She was on a voyage from Calcutta to South Shields.
Marie George	United Kingdom	The ship was wrecked at "Greve de Lacy". She was on a voyage from Limerick to Brest, Finistère, France.
True Blue	United Kingdom	The ship ran aground off Trouville-sur-Mer, Calvados, France. She was on a voyage from the Clyde to Rouen, Seine-Inférieure, France. She was refloated on 16 February and taken into the Seine.

== 17 February ==
List of shipwrecks: 17 February 1843
Ship	State	Description
Caroline	United Kingdom	The ship was wrecked south of Jersey, Channel Islands. Her crew were rescued. She was on a voyage from Newcastle upon Tyne, Northumberland to Jersey.
Harrington	United Kingdom	The schooner was wrecked at Point Salinas, Portuguese Angola. Her crew were rescued. She was on a voyage from London to Saint Helena and Benguela, Portuguese Angola.
Oyster	United Kingdom	The dredging boat was wrecked at Harwich, Essex.
Traveller	United Kingdom	The brig was wrecked on the Shipwash Sand (Benham) or Gunfleet Sand (newspapers). Her ten crew were rescued by the smacks Atalanta and New Gipsy (both United Kingdom). Traveller was on a voyage from Hartlepool, County Durham to London.

== 18 February ==
List of shipwrecks: 18 February 1843
Ship	State	Description
Alcyone	French Navy	The ship sank at Brest, Finistère with the loss of a crew member.
Astrea	United Kingdom	The ship was driven ashore at Portland, Dorset. She was on a voyage from Dublin to London. She was refloated on 9 March and taken into Weymouth, Dorset.
Belle Gabrielle	France	The ship was driven ashore and wrecked near Audierne, Finistère. She was on a voyage from Les Sables-d'Olonne, Vendée to Cherbourg, Seine-Inférieure.
Blossom	United Kingdom	The ship was driven ashore near Lavernock, Glamorgan. Her crew were rescued. She was on a voyage from Bristol, Gloucestershire to Newport, Monmouthshire.
Commodore	United Kingdom	The ship was driven ashore at Swanage, Dorset. She was on a voyage from Portsmouth, Hampshire to Yarmouth, Isle of Wight.
Czar	United Kingdom	The ship was run into by Prince of Wales (United Kingdom) and was beached at Sheerness, Kent.
Eliza	United Kingdom	The ship was driven ashore at New Grimsby, Isles of Scilly. She was on a voyage from Dublin to London. She was refloated.
Equity	United Kingdom	The ship was driven ashore on the Sandwich Flats. Her crew were rescued. She was refloated on 28 February and taken into Sandwich.
Fly	United Kingdom	The ship was driven ashore at Selsey Bill, Sussex.
Francis	United Kingdom	The schooner was driven ashore and wrecked at Dungeness, Kent with the loss of all seven crew. She was on a voyage from London to Bristol, Gloucestershire.
Funchal	United Kingdom	The ship ran aground and was damaged at New Grimsby. She was on a voyage from Liverpool, Lancashire to London.
General Foy	France	The ship was wrecked on the Coubeau Rocks, off the coast of Finistère. She was on a voyage from Bordeaux, Gironde to Marans, Charente-Maritime.
Jane	United Kingdom	The ship was driven ashore at Portland, Dorset.
John and Richard	United Kingdom	The ship was driven ashore at Harwich, Essex. She was on a voyage from London to Sunderland, County Durham. She was refloated on 20 February.
Margaret	United Kingdom	The ship was driven ashore at St. Ives, Cornwall. She was refloated but then ran into Pearl (United Kingdom which was also ashore. Margaret was on a voyage from Plymouth, Devon to Swansea, Glamorgan.
Marie	France	The ship was driven ashore at St. Ubes, Portugal. She was later refloated.
Mary	United Kingdom	The ship was wrecked on the Maplin Sand, in the North Sea off the coast of Essex. Her six crew were rescued by Eugene (United Kingdom). She was on a voyage from Stockton-on-Tees, County Durham to Rochester, Kent.
Mary and Agnes	United Kingdom	The ship was driven ashore on the Sandwich Flats. Her crew were rescued. She was on a voyage from Shoreham-by-Sea, Sussex to Hartlepool, County Durham. She was refloated on 4 March and taken into Ramsgate, Kent.
Mary and Elizabeth	United Kingdom	The ship was driven ashore and sank at Wainfleet, Lincolnshire.
Nevis	United Kingdom	The ship ran aground on the Iron Sands, in the North Sea off the coast of County Durham. She was on a voyage from South Shields, County Durham to St. Thomas, Virgin Islands.
Pearl	United Kingdom	The ship was driven ashore at St. Ives. She was on a voyage from Cork to Bristol, Gloucestershire. Whilst ashore, she was run into by Margaret (United Kingdom) and severely damaged. She was refloated and taken into St. Ives.
Vine	United Kingdom	The ship was driven ashore at New Grimsby. She was on a voyage from South Shields to Bristol, She was refloated.
Whisper	United Kingdom	The ship struck the Boisons Rocks, off the coast of Cornwall, and sank. Her crew were rescued. She was on a voyage from Falmouth, Cornwall to Swansea, Glamorgan.

== 19 February ==
List of shipwrecks: 19 February 1843
Ship	State	Description
Anne	France	The ship was driven ashore and wrecked near the La Coubre Lighthouse, Charente-Maritime. Her crew were rescued. She was on a voyage from Bordeaux, Gironde to Gijón, Spain.
Emerald Isle	United Kingdom	The steamship ran aground on the Cross Sand, in the North Sea off the coast of Norfolk. She was on a voyage from Hamburg to Hull, Yorkshire. Emerald Isle was refloated but was consequently beached.
Destin	France	The ship was driven ashore near St. Ubes, Portugal.
Industry	United Kingdom	The sloop was driven ashore at Portland, Dorset.
Lord Althorp	United Kingdom	The sloop was driven ashore at Portland.
Mary Ann	United Kingdom	The ship was driven ashore at South Shields, County Durham.
Providence	United Kingdom	The ship was in collision with Olive Branch (United Kingdom) and was beached at "Guiver", Cornwall. She was on a voyage from Plymouth, Devon to Swansea, Glamorgan.
St. Joseph et Assomption	France	The ship was lost in the Bay of Calvaire. Her crew were rescued. She was on a voyage from Toulon, Var to Marseille, Bouches-du-Rhône.
Traveller	United Kingdom	The brig was wrecked on the Gunfleet Sand, in the North Sea off the coast of Essex. Her eleven crew were rescued on 21 February by the smacks Atalanta and New Gipsey, with assistance from the paddle steamer Gazelle (all United Kingdom). She was on a voyage from Hartlepool, County Durham to London.
William and Lucy	United Kingdom	The sloop was driven ashore at Portland.

== 20 February ==
List of shipwrecks: 20 February 1843
Ship	State	Description
Diana	United Kingdom	The ship was driven ashore in the Bay of Gibraltar. She was on a voyage from Livorno, Grand Duchy of Tuscany to London. She was refloated.
Isabella	United Kingdom	The ship was driven ashore near Sutton Bridge, Lincolnshire. She was on a voyage from Sunderland, County Durham to Wisbech, Cambridgeshire. She was refloated but collided with the Crosskeys Bridge and sank.
Lord Oriel	United Kingdom	The ship sprang a leak and was beached on the Spit Bank, in the Irish Sea. She was on a voyage from Falmouth, Cornwall to Swansea, Glamorgan.
Margaret	United Kingdom	The brig foundered in the Irish Sea 20 nautical miles (37 km) off Clogherhead, County Louth with the loss of three of her eight crew. She was on a voyage from Ardrossan, Ayrshire to Dublin.
Maria	Denmark	The ship sprang a leak and was beached at Poole, Dorset, United Kingdom. She was on a voyage from Stubbekøbing to Rouen, Seine-Inférieure, France.
Mary Marsden	United Kingdom	The ship was driven ashore at Gibraltar. She was on a voyage from Volo, Ottoman Empire to London. She was later refloated.
Moy	United Kingdom	The ship was driven ashore on Jura. She was on a voyage from Limerick to the Clyde.
Nancy	United Kingdom	The sloop was run down and sunk in the North Sea 20 to 25 nautical miles (37 to 46 km) off the Spurn Lighthouse, Yorkshire by a schooner. Her crew were rescued by the smack British Hero (United Kingdom).

== 21 February ==
List of shipwrecks: 21 February 1843
Ship	State	Description
Effort	United Kingdom	The ship was abandoned in the North Sea 12 nautical miles (22 km) off Whitby, Yorkshire. Her crew were rescued by Hector (United Kingdom). Effort was subsequently discovered by Perseverance (United Kingdom which put a skeleton crew on board and took her into Scarborough.
Jura	United Kingdom	The ship was wrecked 15 nautical miles (28 km) north of Campbeltown, Argyllshire. She was on a voyage from Jura to the Clyde.

== 22 February ==
List of shipwrecks: 22 February 1843
Ship	State	Description
Admiraal van Heemskerk	Netherlands	The East Indiaman ran aground on the Long Sand or the Goodwin Sands, Kent, United Kingdom. She was on a voyage from a Dutch port to Batavia, Netherlands East Indies. She was refloated on 23 February and towed into Sheerness, Kent.
Albion	United Kingdom	The ship was driven ashore 2 nautical miles (3.7 km) west of Hurst Castle, Hampshire. Her crew were rescued. She was on a voyage from Plymouth, Devon to Portsmouth, Hampshire.
Effort	United Kingdom	The ship was abandoned in the North Sea off Whitby, Yorkshire. Her crew were rescued.
Eugene	France	The ship was wrecked. She was on a voyage from Marseille, Bouches-du-Rhône to Beyrout, Ottoman Syria.
Isabella	United Kingdom	The ship was driven ashore in Kingsgate Bay, Kent. She was on a voyage from Jersey, Channel Islands to London. She was refloated the next day and taken into Margate, Kent.
Jemima	United Kingdom	The brig was destroyed by fire in the Atlantic Ocean. Her crew were rescued by Gartsherrie (United Kingdom).
Premium	United Kingdom	The brig ran aground on the Maplin Sand, in the North Sea off the coast of Essex. She was refloated on 16 March and taken into Sheerness, Kent.
Swan	United Kingdom	The ship was driven ashore and wrecked at Newton Burrowes, Glamorgan. She was on a voyage from Cardiff to Swansea.

== 23 February ==
List of shipwrecks: 23 February 1843
Ship	State	Description
Alfred	United Kingdom	The ship was driven ashore and wrecked in Ardmore Bay. Her crew were rescued. She was on a voyage from Swansea, Glamorgan to Youghal, County Cork.
Bonne Mère	France	The ship was driven ashore between Green Island and Algeciras, Spain. She was later refloated.
Victoria	United Kingdom	The ship was driven ashore near "Corril", Spain with the loss of a crew member. She was on a voyage from Newcastle upon Tyne, Northumberland to Marseille, Bouches-du-Rhône, France.
William Cotterell	United Kingdom	The ship ran aground and was severely damaged at Douglas, Isle of Man. She was on a voyage from Liverpool, Lancashire to Portrush, County Antrim.

== 24 February ==
List of shipwrecks: 24 February 1843
Ship	State	Description
Allerton	United Kingdom	The ship ran aground on the North Gar Sand, in the North Sea off the coast of County Durham. She was refloated but was driven ashore at Seaton, County Durham. Her crew were rescued. She was on a voyage from London to Stockton-on-Tees, County Durham.
Deux Frères	France	The ship was wrecked on the coast of Mira, Portugal. Her crew were rescued. She was on a voyage from Honfleur, Calvados to Port-Vendres, Pyrénées-Orientales.
Duke of Wellington	United Kingdom	The ship capsized and sank in the English Channel off Penzance, Cornwall with the loss of all hands.
X. L.	United Kingdom	The brig was wrecked at Hartlepool, County Durham with the loss of ten of the eleven people on board. She was on a voyage from Antwerp, Belgium to Hartlepool.

== 25 February ==
List of shipwrecks: 25 February 1843
Ship	State	Description
Jane Erskine	United Kingdom	The ship was wrecked on Castle Island, Bermuda. She was on a voyage from Aux Cayes, Haiti to Falmouth, Cornwall.
Motus	United States	The ship was abandoned in the Atlantic Ocean. Her crew were rescued by Wakona (France). Motus was on a voyage from Charleston, South Carolina to Hull, Yorkshire, United Kingdom.

== 26 February ==
List of shipwrecks: 26 February 1843
Ship	State	Description
Bridget	United Kingdom	The ship was abandoned in the Atlantic Ocean. Her crew were rescued by Monticello (United Kingdom). She was on a voyage from Halifax, Nova Scotia, British North America to Jamaica.
Hottingeur	United Kingdom	The ship was driven ashore on Fire Island, New York, United States. She was on a voyage from Liverpool, Lancashire to New York City.
Medea	United Kingdom	The ship was wrecked on Læsø, Denmark. She was on a voyage from Memel, Prussia to an English port.
Panmure	United Kingdom	The ship ran aground on the Andrews Sand, in the North Sea off the coast of Suffolk. She was on a voyage from Maldon, Essex to South Shields, County Durham. Panmure was refloated and taken into Harwich, Essex.

== 27 February ==
List of shipwrecks: 27 February 1843
Ship	State	Description
Cigne	Spain	The ship was wrecked at Almería. She was on a voyage from Liverpool, Lancashire, United Kingdom to Adra.
Elizabeth	United Kingdom	The ship was wrecked between Almeria and Cape Gatt, Spain. She was on a voyage from Cephalonia, United States of the Ionian Islands to Leith, Lothian.
Fancy	United Kingdom	The ship was wrecked between Almería and Cape Gatt. Her crew were rescued. She was on a voyage from Livorno, Grand Duchy of Tuscany to Dublin.
François Honore	France	The ship was wrecked near Almería, Spain with some loss of life. She was on a voyage from Marseille, Bouches-du-Rhône to Havre de Grâce, Seine-Inférieure.
Frederic	France	The ship was wrecked near Gibraltar. She was on a voyage from Dunkirk, Nord to Marseille, Bouches-du-Rhône.
Joven Clarita	Spain	The ship was wrecked near Almería.
Neptune	United Kingdom	The ship was driven ashore at Spurn Point, Yorkshire. She was later refloated.
Nicoline	Russia	The ship was run down and sunk off the Isles of Scilly, United Kingdom. Her crew were rescued by Aid (United Kingdom).
Panther	United Kingdom	The ship was wrecked on the West Hoyle Bank, in Liverpool Bay. Her crew were rescued. She was on a voyage from Antwerp, Belgium to Liverpool, Lancashire. Panther was refloated on 5 April and taken into Liverpool.
Palomo	Spain	The ship was wrecked near Almería. She was on a voyage from Palma, Mallorca to Havana, Cuba.
Thomas	United Kingdom	The ship foundered in the North Sea off Berwick upon TweedNorthumberland. Her crew were rescued. She was on a voyage from Newcastle upon Tyne, Northumberland to Dundee, Forfarshire.

== 28 February ==
List of shipwrecks: 28 February 1843
Ship	State	Description
Bomanjee Horsmanjee	(United Kingdom of Great Britain and Ireland) India	The ship ran aground in the Hooghly River and was damaged. She was on a voyage from Calcutta to Bombay. She was refloated and put back to Calcutta.
David	United Kingdom	The schooner was driven against the pier at Barcelona, Spain and sank.
Despatch	United Kingdom	The ship was wrecked on the Hoyle Bank, in Liverpool Bay Her crew were rescued. She was on a voyage from Wicklow to Liverpool, Lancashire.
Don Hermanos	Spain	The ship ran aground on the Liquitio Sandbank, in the Bay of Biscay off the coast of Spain. She was on a voyage from Havana, Cuba to Santander.
Panther	United Kingdom	The ship was wrecked on the West Hoyle Bank, in Liverpool Bay. Her crew were rescued. She was on a voyage from Antwerp, Belgium to Liverpool, Lancashire.
Peggy	United Kingdom	The ship was driven ashore at Wexford. Her crew were rescued. She was refloated on 5 March and taken into Wexford.

== Unknown date ==
List of shipwrecks: Unknown date in February 1843
Ship	State	Description
Amalia	Trieste	The ship was wrecked at "San Marino", near Santander, Spain. She was on a voyage from London, United Kingdom to Trieste.
Beer and Wingyett	United Kingdom	The ship was wrecked on the Banjaard Sand, in the North Sea off the Dutch coast. Her crew were rescued by Defiance (United Kingdom).
Catherine	United Kingdom	The ship was driven ashore near Stockton-on-Tees, County Durham. She was refloated on 25 February.
Clarisse	France	The ship was wrecked at Havre de Grâce, Seine-Inférieure before 6 February.
Claude	France	The ship was wrecked in heavy gales on the coast of Caramania, Ottoman Empire before 13 February. She was on a voyage from Tarsus, Ottoman Empire to Marseille, France
Eagle	United Kingdom	The ship was driven ashore near Stockton-on-Tees. She was refloated on 25 February.
Francis Ashley	United States	The ship was wrecked on the Loggerhead Key Shoals before 4 February. Her crew were rescued. She was on a voyage from "Matanzan", Cuba to New York.
Friends	United Kingdom	The ship was driven ashore at Lowestoft, Suffolk. She was refloated on 10 February.
Lord Aberdeen	United Kingdom	The ship foundered in the North Sea off the Farne Islands, Northumberland before 25 February.
Mary Ann	United Kingdom	The ship was driven ashore west of Wells-next-the-Sea, Norfolk. She was refloated on 26 February and taken into Wells-next-the-Sea.
Mathilde	France	The ship was abandoned in the Baltic Sea before 9 February. She was on a voyage from Messina, Sicily to Saint Petersburg, Russia. She was subsequently taken into "Egvaag".
Pallion Hall	United Kingdom	The ship was driven ashore at Harfleur, Seine-Inférieure, or Honfleur, Calvados, France. She was on a voyage from Sunderland to Rouen, Seine-Inférieure.
Phocion	France	The steamship was lost before 23 February.
Resolution	United Kingdom	The smack was in collision with a brig and foundered off the Shipwash Sand, in the North Sea off the coast of Essex Three of her seven crew were reported missing, four were rescued by Dolphin (United Kingdom).
Thomas	United Kingdom	The schooner was driven ashore on Skomer, Pembrokeshire before 11 February and sank.
Thompson	United Kingdom	The ship was wrecked on the Hogsty Reef, Bahamas before 1 March. She was on a voyage from St. Jago de Cuba, Cuba to Swansea, Glamorgan.
Verstock	Denmark	The barque was run down and sunk in the Atlantic Ocean off the coast of Ireland with the loss of all but three of those on board. The survivors were rescued on 1 March by Diana (United Kingdom). Verstock was on a voyage from Montevideo, Uruguay to Antwerp, Belgium.
Victoria	(United Kingdom of Great Britain and Ireland) New Zealand	The brig ran aground at Nelson. She was refloated the next day.
