= Barrington Passage, Nova Scotia =

Barrington Passage
- Community
- Location of Barrington Passage, Nova Scotia
- Coordinates: 43.5275°N 65.609167°W
- Country: Canada
- Province: Nova Scotia
- County: Shelburne
- Municipal district: Barrington
- Time zone: UTC-4 (AST)
  - Summer (DST): UTC-3 (ADT)
- Postal code(s): B0W 1G0
- Area code: 902
- Access Routes: Trunk 3

Barrington Passage is a community in the Canadian province of Nova Scotia, located in the Municipality of the District of Barrington of Shelburne County. It is named after William Barrington, 2nd Viscount Barrington.

== History ==
The Mi'kmaq called the area, "Ministiguish" or "Ministegkek", meaning "he has gone for it." The Acadians called the area, "La Passage". Eighty families from Cape Cod and Nantucket, Massachusetts settled in the area in 1760.

While Barrington has grown substantially over the past decade, it has experienced tough economic times because of a shortage of lobster (the primary industry).

A causeway to Cape Sable Island, just south of the community, was opened in 1949 to replace the ferry service, which had had to run through heavy currents. A bridge had been considered but was rejected. Since then, sand has been collecting on the east side of the causeway, making a beach on Cape Sable Island that has nearly connected to the mainland. It is called North East Point Beach.

It is also the home of Lucy the Lobster, a groundhog alternative for Groundhog Day.

== Sports ==
Barrington Passage has an indoor hockey arena- The Sandy Wickens Memorial Arena, as well a curling club just down the road at the Barrington Passage Recreational Complex.

== See also ==
- List of communities in Nova Scotia
