= Belmont, Colchester, Nova Scotia =

Community in Nova Scotia, Canada

Belmont
- Location of Belmont, Nova Scotia
- Coordinates: 45°25′25″N 63°23′19″W
- Country: Canada
- Province: Nova Scotia
- County: Colchester County
- Time zone: UTC-4 (AST)
  - Summer (DST): UTC-3 (ADT)
- Postal code: B0M 1C0

Belmont is an unincorporated community in the Canadian province of Nova Scotia, located in Colchester County. Prior to 1872 it was called "Chiganois", the name taken from the nearby river. It was part of the Onslow Township that received New England Planters in the 1760s after the expulsion of the Acadians.
