= Osborne Harbour, Nova Scotia =

Community in Nova Scotia, Canada

Coordinates: 43°42′59.8″N 65°6′28.7″W

Osborne Harbour in Nova Scotia

Osborne Harbour is a community in Shelburne County, Nova Scotia, Canada. It may have been named for Osborne House, a royal residence used by Queen Victoria on the Isle of Wight. The community was originally settled by Loyalists in 1788.
