= List of postal codes of Canada: B =

This is a list of postal codes in Canada where the first letter is B. Postal codes beginning with B are located within the Canadian province of Nova Scotia. Only the first three characters are listed, corresponding to the Forward Sortation Area (FSA).

Canada Post provides a free postal code look-up tool on its website, via its mobile apps for smartphones and sells hard-copy directories and CD-ROMs. Many vendors also sell validation tools, which allow customers to properly match addresses and postal codes. Hard-copy directories can also be consulted in all post offices, and some libraries.

== Nova Scotia ==
There are currently 77 FSAs in this list. B7* and B8* codes are currently not in use.

=== Urban ===
B1A
Glace Bay
B2A
North Sydney
South Central
B3A
Dartmouth
North
B4A
Bedford
Southeast
B5A
Yarmouth
B6A
Not assigned
B9A
Port Hawkesbury
B1B
Port Morien
B2B
Not assigned
B3B
Dartmouth
Northwest
(Burnside)
B4B
Bedford
Northwest
B5B
Not assigned
B6B
Not assigned
B9B
Not assigned
B1C
Louisbourg
B2C
Iona
B3C
Not assigned
B4C
Lower Sackville
South
B5C
Not assigned
B6C
Not assigned
B9C
Not assigned
B1E
Reserve Mines
B2E
Loch Lomond
B3E
Porters Lake
B4E
Lower Sackville
West
B5E
Not assigned
B6E
Not assigned
B9E
Not assigned
B1G
Dominion
B2G
Antigonish
B3G
Eastern Passage
B4G
Lower Sackville
North
B5G
Not assigned
B6G
Not assigned
B9G
Not assigned
B1H
New Waterford
B2H
New Glasgow
B3H
Halifax
Lower Harbour
B4H
Amherst
B5H
Not assigned
B6H
Not assigned
B9H
Not assigned
B1J
Northside East Bay
B2J
Framboise
B3J
Halifax
Mid-Harbour

Nova Scotia Provincial Government

B4J
Not assigned
B5J
Not assigned
B6J
Not assigned
B9J
Not assigned
B1K
Albert Bridge
B2K
Not assigned
B3K
Halifax
Upper Harbour

Canadian Forces
(MARLANT)

B4K
Not assigned
B5K
Not assigned
B6K
Not assigned
B9K
Not assigned
B1L
Sydney
Southwest
B2L
Not assigned
B3L
Halifax
Central
B4L
Not assigned
B5L
Not assigned
B6L
Valley (Truro)
B9L
Not assigned
B1M
Sydney
East
B2M
Not assigned
B3M
Halifax
Bedford Basin
B4M
Not assigned
B5M
Not assigned
B6M
Not assigned
B9M
Not assigned
B1N
Sydney
North
B2N
Truro
Central
B3N
Halifax
South Central
B4N
Kentville
B5N
Not assigned
B6N
Not assigned
B9N
Not assigned
B1P
Sydney
North Central
B2P
Not assigned
B3P
Halifax
North West Arm
B4P
Wolfville
B5P
Not assigned
B6P
Not assigned
B9P
Not assigned
B1R
Sydney
West
B2R
Waverley
B3R
Halifax
South
B4R
Coldbrook
B5R
Not assigned
B6R
Not assigned
B9R
Not assigned
B1S
Sydney
Central
B2S
Lantz
B3S
Halifax
West
(Bayers Lake / Clayton Park)
B4S
Not assigned
B5S
Not assigned
B6S
Not assigned
B9S
Not assigned
B1T
Christmas Island
B2T
Enfield / Fall River
(YHZ)
B3T
Timberlea
B4T
Not assigned
B5T
Not assigned
B6T
Not assigned
B9T
Not assigned
B1V
Sydney Mines
B2V
Dartmouth
(Morris Lake / Cole Harbour)
B3V
Williamswood
B4V
Bridgewater
B5V
Not assigned
B6V
Not assigned
B9V
Not assigned
B1W
Eskasoni
B2W
Dartmouth
East Central
(Portland Estates / South Woodside / Woodlawn)
B3W
Not assigned
B4W
Not assigned
B5W
Not assigned
B6W
Not assigned
B9W
Not assigned
B1X
Big Bras d'Or
B2X
Dartmouth
North Central
B3X
Not assigned
B4X
Not assigned
B5X
Not assigned
B6X
Not assigned
B9X
Not assigned
B1Y
Florence
B2Y
Dartmouth
South Central
(North Woodside)
B3Y
Not assigned
B4Y
Not assigned
B5Y
Not assigned
B6Y
Not assigned
B9Y
Not assigned
B1Z
Not assigned
B2Z
Dartmouth
East
(East Lawrencetown / Preston / Mineville / Upper Lawrencetown)
B3Z
Upper Tantallon
B4Z
Not assigned
B5Z
Not assigned
B6Z
Not assigned
B9Z
Not assigned

=== Rural ===
B0A
Not in use
B0B
Not in use
B0C
North Victoria County

1C0: Cape North
1E0: Capstick
1G0: Dingwall
1H0: Englishtown
1K0: Ingonish
1L0: Ingonish Beach
1N0: Neil's Harbour
1P0: New Haven
1R0: St. Margaret Village

B0E
West Cape Breton Island

1A0: Arichat
1B0: Baddeck
1C0: Belle Cote
1H0: Chéticamp
1J0: Cleveland
1K0: D’Escousse
1L0: Grand Etang
1M0: Grand River
1N0: Inverness
1P0: Judique
1S0: L’Ardoise
1T0: Little Narrows
1V0: Louisdale
1W0: Lower L’Ardoise
1X0: Mabou
1Y0: Margaree
1Z0: Margaree Centre
2A0: Margaree Forks
2B0: Margaree Harbour
2C0: Margaree Valley
2G0: Mulgrave
2H0: North East Margaree
2K0: Orangedale
2L0: Petit de Grat
2M0: Petit Etang
2P0: Pleasant Bay
2W0: Port Hood
2X0: River Bourgeois
2Y0: River Denys
3A0: St-Joseph-du-Moine
3B0: St. Peter's
3E0: Scotsville
3H0: South West Margaree
3J0: West Arichat
3K0: West Bay
3L0: West Bay Road
3M0: Whycocomagh
3N0: Wagmatcook

B0G
Not in use
B0H
Canso region

1A0: Afton Station
1E0: Aspen
1G0: Boylston
1H0: Canso
1J0: Cross Roads Country Harbour
1K0: Frankville
1L0: Goldboro
1M0: Goshen
1N0: Guysborough
1P0: Havre Boucher
1R0: Heatherton
1S0: Isaac's Harbour
1T0: Larry's River
1V0: Little Dover
1W0: Monastery
1X0: St. Andrews

B0J
South HRM and mainland east shore

1A0: Bickerton West
1B0: Black Point
1C0: Blandford
1E0: Blockhouse
1H0: Brooklyn
1J0: Chester
1K0: Chester Basin
1M0: Fisherman's Harbour
1N0: Head of Chezzetcook
1P0: Head Of Jeddore
1T0: Hubbards
1W0: Jeddore Oyster Ponds
1Y0: Lake Charlotte
2A0: Liscomb
2B0: Little Tancook
2C0: Lunenburg
2E0: Mahone Bay
2G0: Marie Joseph
2H0: Mill Village
2J0: Mooseland
2K0: Moser River
2L0: Musquodoboit Harbour
2M0: New Ross
2R0: Port Dufferin
2T0: Port Medway
2W0: Riverport
2X0: Rose Bay
3A0: Shearwater
3B0: Sheet Harbour
3C0: Sherbrooke
3G0: Tancook Island
3H0: Tangier
3M0: Western Shore

B0K
Northumberland Strait north shore

1A0: Barney's River Station
1B0: Eureka
1C0: Hopewell
1E0: Malagash
1G0: Merigomish
1H0: Pictou
1J0: Pictou Island
1K0: Port Howe
1L0: Pugwash
1M0: Pugwash Junction
1N0: River John
1P0: Salt Springs
1R0: Scotsburn
1S0: Stellarton
1T0: Sunnybrae
1V0: Tatamagouche
1W0: Thorburn
1X0: Trenton
1Y0: Wallace
1Z0: West River Station
2A0: Westville

B0L
Isthmus of Chignecto

1A0: Joggins
1B0: Maccan
1C0: Nappan
1E0: Northport
1G0: River Hebert
1H0: River Hebert East

B0M
Cobequid Bay north shore

1A0: Advocate Harbour
1B0: Bass River
1C0: Belmont
1E0: Collingwood Corner
1G0: Debert
1H0: Diligent River
1J0: Economy
1K0: Five Islands
1L0: Great Village
1M0: Londonderry
1N0: Lower Five Islands
1P0: Oxford
1R0: Oxford Junction
1S0: Parrsboro
1T0: Port Greville
1V0: River Philip
1W0: Southampton
1X0: Springhill
1Z0: Wentworth
2A0: Westchester Station

B0N
North HRM and Hants County

1C0: Brookfield
1E0: Centre Burlington
1G0: Cheverie
1H0: Curry's Corner
1K0: Elderbank
1L0: Ellershouse
1P0: Kennetcook
1T0: Maitland
1V0: Meaghers Grant
1W0: Micmac
1X0: Middle Musquodoboit
1Y0: Milford Station, Milford
1Z0: Mount Uniacke
2A0: Newport
2B0: Newport Station
2C0: Noel
2E0: St. Croix
2G0: Scotch Village
2H0: Shubenacadie
2J0: Stewiacke
2K0: Summerville
2L0: Upper Kennetcook
2M0: Upper Musquodoboit
2N0: Upper Rawdon
2P0: Upper Stewiacke
2R0: Walton
2T0: Windsor
3A0: Ellershouse

B0P
Kings County

0A0: Greenwood
1A0: Auburn
1B0: Avonport
1C0: Aylesford
1E0: Berwick
1G0: Cambridge
1H0: Canning
1J0: Centreville
1L0: Falmouth
1M0: Grand-Pré
1N0: Greenwood
1P0: Hantsport
1R0: Kingston
1T0: Port Williams
1V0: Waterville
1W0: Wilmot

B0R
West Lunenburg County

1A0: Barss Corner
1C0: LaHave
1E0: New Germany
1G0: Pleasantville
1H0: Springfield

B0S
West Annapolis County

1A0: Annapolis Royal
1B0: Bear River
1C0: Bridgetown
1E0: Clementsport
1G0: Clementsvale
1H0: Cornwallis Park
1J0: Deep Brook
1K0: Granville Ferry
1L0: Hampton
1M0: Lawrencetown
1N0: Margaretsville
1P0: Middleton
1R0: Paradise
1S0: Smith's Cove

B0T
Region of Queens Municipality

1B0: Caledonia
1E0: Greenfield
1G0: Hunt's Point
1H0: Ingomar
1J0: Jordan Falls
1K0: Liverpool
1L0: Lockeport
1M0: Lydgate
1N0: Maitland Bridge
1P0: Milton
1R0: Osborne Harbour
1S0: Port Joli
1T0: Port Mouton
1V0: Sable River
1W0: Shelburne
1X0: South Brookfield

B0V
Digby County

1A0: Digby
1B0: Freeport
1C0: Little River
1E0: Sandy Cove
1G0: Tiverton
1H0: Westport

B0W
Southwest Mainland

1B0: Arcadia
1E0: Barrington
1G0: Barrington Passage
1H0: Barton
1J0: Belliveau's Cove
1M0: Church Point
1N0: Clam Point
1P0: Clark's Harbour
1R0: Clyde River
1S0: Crowell
1W0: Glenwood
1Y0: Kemptville
1Z0: Little Brook
2A0: Lower East Pubnico
2B0: Lower Wedgeport
2C0: Lower West Pubnico
2E0: Lower Woods Harbour
2G0: McGray
2H0: Mavillette
2J0: Meteghan
2K0: Meteghan Centre
2L0: Meteghan River
2M0: Middle West Pubnico
2P0: North East Point
2R0: Plympton
2S0: Port Clyde
2W0: Pubnico
2X0: Ste-Anne-du-Ruisseau
2Y0: Salmon River
2Z0: Saulnierville
3B0: Shag Harbour
3E0: South Ohio
3J0: Stoney Island
3M0: Tusket
3P0: Wedgeport
3S0: West Pubnico
3T0: Weymouth

B0X
Not in use
B0Y
Not in use
B0Z
Not in use

== Most populated FSAs ==
1. B0P, 41,544
2. B0J, 41,032
3. B0N, 40,484
4. B3M, 37,555
5. B0K, 35,141

== Least populated FSAs ==
1. B2E, 54
2. B2J, 67
3. B2C, 262
4. B1T, 400
5. B1X, 921
