= Nova Scotia Route 330 =

Highway in Nova Scotia, Canada

Route 330

Route information
- Maintained by Nova Scotia Department of Transportation and Infrastructure Renewal
- Length: 17 km (11 mi)

Major junctions
- South end: Hawk Point Road in Lower Clarks Harbour
- North end: Trunk 3 in Barrington Passage

Location
- Country: Canada
- Province: Nova Scotia
- Counties: Shelburne

Highway system
- Provincial highways in Nova Scotia; 100-series
← Route 329	→ Route 331

Route 330 is a collector road in the Canadian province of Nova Scotia.

It is located in Shelburne County and connects Barrington Passage at Trunk 3 with Clark's Harbour.

It crosses the Barrington Passage to Cape Sable Island on a causeway that opened in 1949, replacing a ferry service.

== Communities ==
- Lower Clarks Harbour
- Clark's Harbour
- Centreville
- Barrington Passage

== History ==
The entirety of Collector Highway 330 was once designated as Trunk Highway 30. This is not to be confused with the current alignment of the Trunk 30, also known as the Cabot Trail.

== See also ==
- List of Nova Scotia provincial highways
