= List of counties of Nova Scotia =

Counties of Nova Scotia
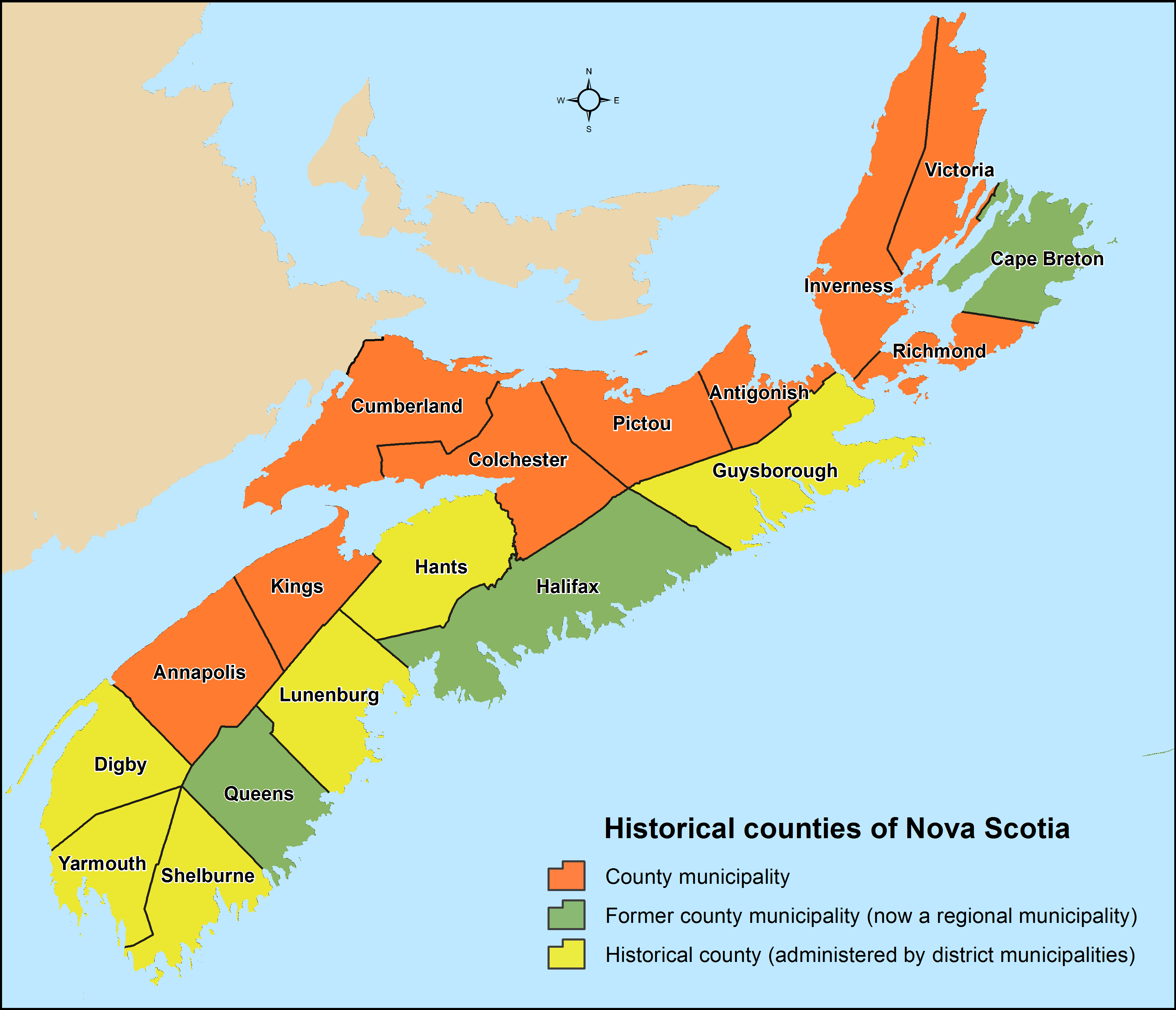
- Nova Scotia's 18 counties by government structure
- Location: Province of Nova Scotia
- Number: 18
- Populations: 7,373 (Guysborough) – 440,072 (Halifax)
- Areas: 1,246.08 km² (Richmond) – 5,477.53 km² (Halifax)
- Government: County government (defunct in 9 counties)
- Subdivisions: Municipalities

Counties of Nova Scotia (1862) with township subdivisions

The Canadian province of Nova Scotia has a historical system of 18 counties that originally had appointed court systems for local administration before the establishment of elected local governments in 1879. The historical counties continue as census divisions used by Statistics Canada in administering the Canadian census.

== History ==
Before the establishment of rural municipalities in the form of county municipalities and district municipalities in 1879, local government in the historical counties was administered by appointed courts of sessions including justices appointed by the Crown with support from local proprietors selected to grand juries. These courts of sessions met "in the counties to hear cases, make regulations, authorize assessments, and appoint local officers." On April 17, 1879, the original non-elected courts of sessions were abolished in favour of elected councils when The County Incorporation Act came into force, which stated

The Inhabitants of every County and Sessional District in this Province ... shall be a body corporate under the name of the Municipality of the respective county or district, as the case may (be), ...

As a result, 12 county municipalities were established, while the remaining 6 counties, which were previously divided into districts for court sessional purposes, were established as district municipalities. Today, 9 of the original 12 remain incorporated as county municipalities, with 3 eventually becoming regional municipalities in 1995 and 1996, while Statistics Canada uses all 18 historical counties as census divisions for statistical purposes in the Canadian census. County municipalities and district municipalities provide local government to the residents of the historical counties living outside of incorporated towns and regional municipalities.

== List ==
County	County seat	Established	Organization of county	Population (2021)	Population (2016)	Change	Land area (km²)	Population density	Map
Annapolis	Annapolis Royal	1759	County municipality	21,252	20,591	+3.2%	3,183.23	6.7/km^{2}	
Antigonish	Antigonish	1785	County municipality	20,129	19,301	+4.3%	1,456.42	13.8/km^{2}	
Cape Breton^{a}	Sydney	1765	Regional municipality	98,318	98,722	−0.4%	2,457.21	40.0/km^{2}	
Colchester	Truro	1835	County municipality	51,476	50,585	+1.8%	3,627.50	14.2/km^{2}	
Cumberland	Amherst	1759	County municipality	30,538	30,005	+1.8%	4,275.77	7.1/km^{2}	
Digby	Digby	1837	District municipality	17,062	17,323	−1.5%	2,512.28	6.8/km^{2}	
Guysborough	Guysborough	1836	District municipality	7,373	7,625	−3.3%	4,037.16	1.8/km^{2}	
Halifax^{b}	Halifax	1759	Regional municipality	440,072	403,390	+9.1%	5,477.53	80.3/km^{2}	
Hants	Windsor	1781	District municipality	45,140	42,558	+6.1%	3,049.18	14.8/km^{2}	
Inverness	Port Hood	1835	County municipality	17,346	17,235	+0.6%	3,817.61	4.5/km^{2}	
Kings	Kentville	1759	County municipality	62,914	60,600	+3.8%	2,120.31	29.7/km^{2}	
Lunenburg	Lunenburg	1759	District municipality	48,599	47,126	+3.1%	2,906.47	16.7/km^{2}	
Pictou	Pictou	1835	County municipality	43,657	43,748	−0.2%	2,844.10	15.4/km^{2}	
Queens^{c}	Liverpool	1762	Regional municipality	10,501	10,351	+1.4%	2,393.44	4.4/km^{2}	
Richmond	Arichat	1835	County municipality	8,914	8,964	−0.6%	1,246.08	7.2/km^{2}	
Shelburne	Shelburne	1784	District municipality	13,704	13,966	−1.9%	2,462.58	5.6/km^{2}	
Victoria	Baddeck	1851	County municipality	7,441	7,089	+5.0%	2,836.19	2.6/km^{2}	
Yarmouth	Yarmouth	1836	District municipality	24,947	24,419	+2.2%	2,121.64	11.8/km^{2}	
Total counties	—	—	—	969,383	923,598	+5.0%	52,824.71	18.4/km^{2}	

^{a} county boundaries contiguous with those of the Cape Breton Regional Municipality.
^{b} county boundaries contiguous with those of the Halifax Regional Municipality.
^{c} county boundaries contiguous with those of the Region of Queens Municipality.

== See also ==
- Administrative divisions of Canada
- Administrative divisions of Nova Scotia
- Demographics of Nova Scotia
- Geography of Nova Scotia
- List of communities in Nova Scotia
- List of municipalities in Nova Scotia
- List of towns in Nova Scotia
- List of villages in Nova Scotia
- Subdivisions of Canada
