= Municipal district =

Administrative entity

A municipal district is an administrative entity comprising a clearly defined territory and its population. It may be a city, a town, a village, a small grouping of them, or a rural area.

== Brazil ==
In Brazil, municipal districts are, in general, subdivisions of a municipality and do not enjoy political autonomy in Brazil. Municipal districts seats are generally located in villages within the geographic area of a municipality, but sometimes can refer to neighbourhoods adjacent to the city that hosts the municipal seat. In big cities such as São Paulo and Rio de Janeiro districts can host a sub-prefecture (or sub-city hall). Municipal districts in Brazil succeed the old Portuguese parishes from the Brazilian colonial administration.

During the 'New State' (Estado Novo), president Getúlio Vargas, published the Decree-law no. 311, of 2 March 1938, which in its article 3, defined that municipalities' seats would have the status of cities and municipal districts would be named upon their districtal seat's name.

Another type of district is the Federal District, which shares the status of state among the other 26 states. The government of the Federal District has the status of state and municipal government at the same time, with its seat located in Brasília.

== Canada ==
In Canada, municipal districts are a type of rural municipality in Alberta that is governed by elected councils with the mandate to administer rural areas that can include farmlands, resource areas, and unincorporated hamlets and rural residential subdivisions. Statistics Canada recognizes Alberta's 64 municipal districts as a type of census subdivision for statistical purposes.

In Alberta, the term county is synonymous with the term municipal district and is not its own incorporated municipal status that is different from that of a municipal district. As such, Alberta Municipal Affairs provides municipal districts with the opportunity to brand themselves either as municipal districts or counties in their official names.

A county in Alberta used to be a type of designation in a single-tier municipal system, but it was changed to "municipal district" under the Municipal Government Act, when the County Act was repealed in the mid-1990s. They were then also permitted to retain the usage of county in their official names.

Statistics Canada also refers to Nova Scotia's 12 district municipalities as municipal districts for census subdivision purposes. The City of Flin Flon in Manitoba also held a municipal district status between 1933 and 1946.

== China ==
A municipal district (市辖区), also referred to as district (区), is a subdivision of a municipality or prefecture-level city in China.

== Dominican Republic ==
In the Dominican Republic, when a municipality consists of more than one urban center, those beside the municipalities seat can be elevated to the status of a municipal district (distrito municipal). A municipal council (Junta Municipal) for such a municipal district is nominated by the municipal council of the municipality to which it belongs (Ley 3455 Titulo I Capitulo IV).

== Republic of Ireland ==
In Ireland, each county and city and county is divided into municipal districts consisting of one or more local electoral areas (LEAs). The members elected to the county council or the county and city council for these LEAs are also municipal district members for the relevant areas. Some municipal districts are titled "borough districts" (Clonmel, Drogheda, Sligo and Wexford) or "metropolitan districts" (Limerick and Waterford), though they have no additional powers. This does not apply in the case of the counties of Dún Laoghaire–Rathdown, Fingal or South Dublin, or to the cities of Cork, Dublin or Galway.

The system of municipal districts came into operation from 1 June 2014 following local elections in May, at the same time as the abolition of town and borough councils.

== Russia ==
In Russia, municipal districts are a form of local self-government and a type of municipal formations. They are usually formed within the borders of existing administrative districts.

== United States ==
In the United States, the District of Columbia is divided into two municipal districts, based on the city's wards, solely for the purposes of electing delegates in the Democratic Party's presidential primaries to the Democratic National Convention.
