= Shelburne County =

- County
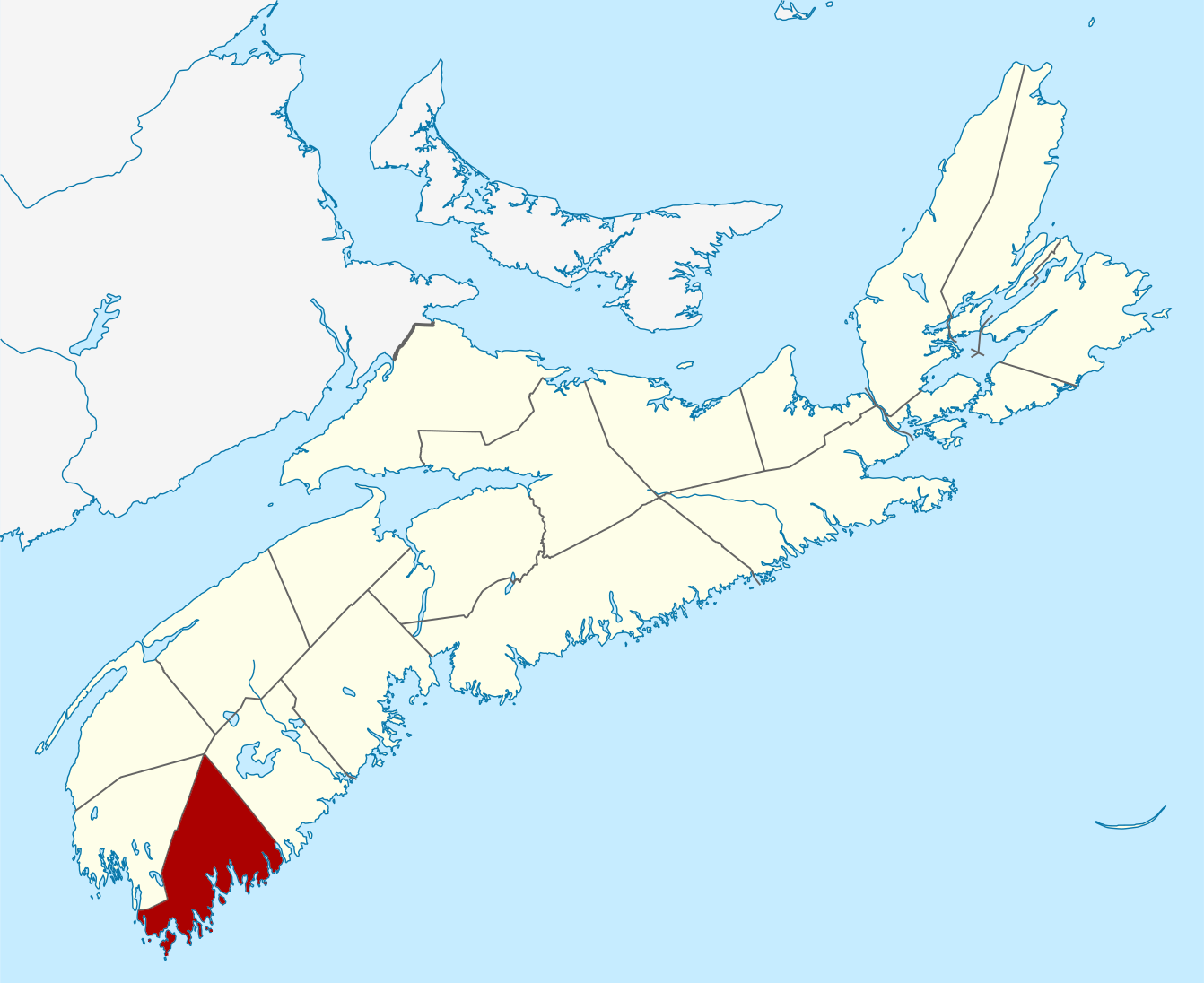
- Location of Shelburne County, Nova Scotia
- Coordinates: 43.8°N 65.3°W
- Country: Canada
- Province: Nova Scotia
- District municipalities: Barrington / Shelburne
- Towns: Shelburne / Lockeport / Clark's Harbour
- Established: 1784
- Divided into District Municipalities: April 17, 1879
- Electoral Districts Federal: South Shore—St. Margarets
- Provincial: Queens-Shelburne

Area
  - Total: 2,462.58 km^{2} (950.81 sq mi)

Population (2021)
  - Total: 13,704
  - Density: 5.6/km^{2} (15/sq mi)
  - Change 2011-16: ▼1.9%
- Time zone: UTC-4 (AST)
  - Summer (DST): UTC-3 (ADT)
- Area code: 902
- Dwellings: 7765
- Median Income*: $40,514 CDN
- Median household income, 2005 (all households)

Shelburne County is a county in the Canadian province of Nova Scotia.

== History ==
Shelburne County was founded in 1784 shortly following the influx of Loyalist settlers evacuated from the newly independent United States. It was originally named Port Roseway, until it became a very busy town and was considered to be the capital of Nova Scotia, in which the name was changed to Shelburne in an attempt to please Lord Shelburne, the British Prime Minister from 1782 to 1783. The boundaries of Shelburne County were established by Governor and Council on December 16, 1785.

The first Loyalists arrived in May 1783. They were faced with a somewhat bleak environment in which to make their homes. The land is rocky with acidic soil. There is also much forest.

The area had previously been settled by French-speaking Catholic Acadians, many of whom had been deported to British Colonies. The new arrivals included Black Loyalists who were given substandard land, particularly around Birchtown. In 1796 about 600 Jamaican Maroons were deported to this area of Nova Scotia as well.

In 1824, at a time when the lines of a number of counties were being cut out and marked, the boundary between Queens and Shelburne Counties was surveyed.

In 1836 Shelburne County was divided into two separate and distinct counties with Yarmouth County being formed out of what had been part of Shelburne County.

In 1854, Shelburne County was divided into two districts for court sessional purposes - Shelburne and Barrington. In 1879, these districts were incorporated as district municipalities.

A 2023 wildfire near Barrington Lake became the largest wildfire in the history of Nova Scotia.

== Demographics ==
As a census division in the 2021 Census of Population conducted by Statistics Canada, Shelburne County had a population of 13,704 living in 6,473 of its 7,904 total private dwellings, a change of −1.9% from its 2016 population of 13,966. With a land area of 2,462.58 km^{2} (950.81 sq mi), it had a population density of 5.6/km^{2} (14.4/sq mi) in 2021.

Population trend

Census	Population	Change (%)
2021	13,704	▼1.9%
2016	13,966	▼3.7%
2011	14,496	▼6.7%
2006	15,544	▼4.2%
2001	16,231	▼4.5%
1996	17,002	▼2.0%
1991	17,343	▼1.0%
1986	17,516	▲1.1%
1981	17,328	N/A
1941	13,251	
1931	12,485	
1921	13,491	
1911	14,105	
1901	14,202	
1891	14,956	
1881	14,913	
1871	12,417	N/A

Mother tongue language (2011)

Language	Population	Pct (%)
English only	14,050	97.91%
French only	155	1.08%
Non-official languages	110	0.77%
Multiple responses	30	0.21%

Ethnic Groups (2006)

Ethnic Origin	Population	Pct (%)
Canadian	9,335	60.6%
English	5,145	33.4%
Scottish	3,115	20.2%
Irish	1,915	12.4%
German	1,805	11.7%
French	1,235	8.0%
Métis	970	6.3%
Dutch (Netherlands)	680	4.4%
North American Indian	630	4.1%

== Communities ==
Towns

- Clark's Harbour
- Lockeport
- Shelburne

District municipalities

- Municipality of the District of Barrington
- Municipality of the District of Shelburne

== Access routes ==
Highways and numbered routes that run through the county, including external routes that start or finish at the county boundary:

- Highways
  - Hwy 103
- Trunk Routes
  - Trunk 3
- Collector Routes:
  - Route 203
  - Route 309
  - Route 330
- External Routes:
  - None

== Notable people ==
- James Bagnall
- John Alexander Barry
- John Brecken
- Mal Davis
- David George (Baptist)
- Jody Holden
- Asa McGray
- Nehemiah McGray
- Donald McKay
- Thomas Robertson
- Wishart McLea Robertson
- Nathaniel Whitworth White
- Gideon White

== See also ==
- List of communities in Nova Scotia
- Black Lake listings within Nova Scotia
