= List of communities in Shelburne County, Nova Scotia =

List of communities in Shelburne County, Nova Scotia

Communities are ordered by the highway on which they are located, whose routes start after each terminus near the largest community.

== Trunk routes ==
- Trunk 3: Sable River - Allendale - East Jordan - Jordan Falls - Shelburne - Birchtown - Crowell - Barrington Passage - Doctors Cove - Shag Harbour - Lower Woods Harbour - Upper Woods Harbour - Charlesville

== Arterial highway ==
- Highway 103:Granite Village -Sable River - Jordan Falls - Birchtown - Clyde River - Oak Park

== Collector roads ==
- Route 203: Shelburne - Lower Ohio - Middle Ohio - Upper Ohio
- Route 309: Clyde River - Port Clyde- Thomasville - Eel Bay - Centreville - Villagedale- Barrington
- Route 330: Centreville- Clark's Harbour

== Rural roads ==
- Atlantic
- Baccaro
- Blanche
- Churchover
- East Green Harbour
- East Side of Ragged Island
- Forbes Point
- Greenwood
- Gunning Cove
- Ingomar
- Jordan Bay
- Jordan Ferry
- Little Harbour
- Little Port l'Hébert
- Lockeport
- Louis Head
- Middle Clyde River
- North West Harbour
- Port L'Hebert
- Port Saxon
- Rockland
- Roseway
- Round Bay
- Sandy Point
- Smithville
- The Hawk
- Upper Clyde River
- Welshtown
- West Baccaro
- West Green Harbour
