= Lighthouse Route =

Scenic roadway in the Canadian province of Nova Scotia

Coordinates: 44°36′40.04″N 64°7′23.7″W

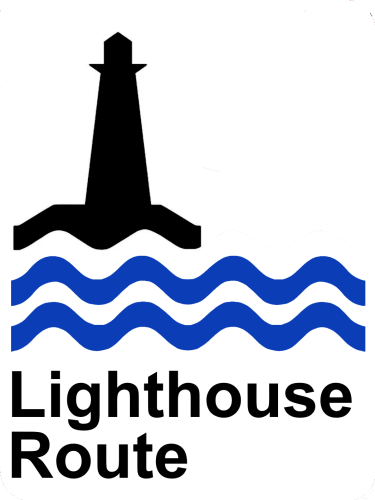
Lighthouse Route

Route information
- Maintained by Department of Transportation and Infrastructure Renewal
- Length: 585 km (364 mi)
- Component highways: Trunk 3; Hwy 103; Route 309; Route 329; Route 330; Route 331; Route 332; Route 333

Major junctions
- East end: Trunk 3 / Route 333 in Halifax
- West end: Trunk 1 / Trunk 3 in Yarmouth

Location
- Country: Canada
- Province: Nova Scotia
- Counties: Halifax Regional Municipality, Lunenburg, Queens, Shelburne, Yarmouth

Highway system
- Provincial highways in Nova Scotia; 100-series

The Lighthouse Route is a scenic roadway in the Canadian province of Nova Scotia. It follows the province's South Shore for 585 km (364 mi) from Halifax to Yarmouth.

== List of highways ==
=== Numbered ===
- Trunk 3
- Highway 103
- Route 309
- Route 329
- Route 330
- Route 331
- Route 332
- Route 333

=== Named roads ===
- Brighton Road
- East Green Harbour Road
- Little Harbour Road
- Port Clyde Road
- Sandy Point Road
- Shore Road
- West Sable Road

== List of communities (east to west) ==
- Halifax
- Halifax Peninsula
- Armdale
- Mainland Halifax
- Beechville
- Goodwood
- Hatchet Lake
- Whites lake
- Shad Bay
- Bayside
- Peggys Cove
- Indian Harbour
- Hacketts Cove
- Glen Margaret
- Seabright
- French Village
- Glen Haven
- Tantallon
- Upper Tantallon
- Hubbards
- Aldersville
- Aspotogan
- Bayswater
- Beech Hill
- Blandford
- Chester
- Chester Basin
- Chester Grant
- Deep Cove
- East River
- Forties Settlement
- Fox Point
- Mill Cove
- Mill Road
- New Ross
- New Russell
- Northeast Cove
- Petite Riviere
- Crescent Beach
- Dublin Shore
- LaHave
- West LaHave
- Pleasantville
- Bridgewater
- Oak Hill
- Mahone Bay
- Upper LaHave
- Middle LaHave
- East LaHave
- Rose Bay
- Riverport
- Lunenburg
- Liverpool
- Lockeport
- Sable River
- Louis Head
- Little Harbour
- Lockeport
- East Green Harbour
- East Jordan
- Shelburne
- Barrington Passage
- Centreville
- Baccaro
- Clyde River
- Charlesville
- Lower Woods Harbour
- Argyle
- Tusket
- Yarmouth
