= Municipality of the District of Shelburne =

District of Shelburne
- District municipality
- Municipality of the District of Shelburne
- Coat of arms
- Motto: From Ocean To Forest
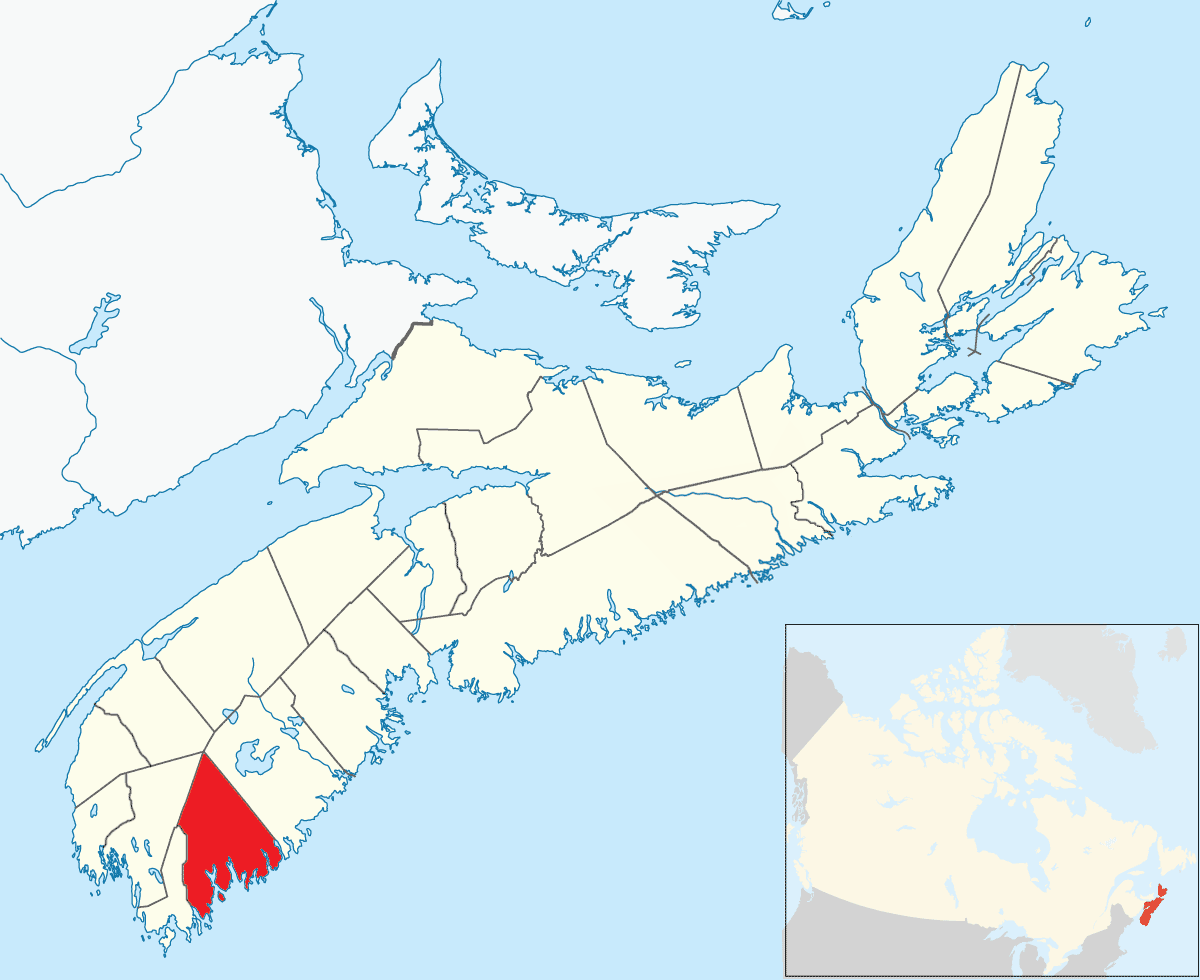
- Location of the Municipality of the District of Shelburne
- Coordinates: 43.85°N 65.282778°W
- Country: Canada
- Province: Nova Scotia
- County: Shelburne
- Incorporated: April 17, 1879
- Electoral Districts Federal: South Shore—St. Margaret's
- Provincial: Shelburne

Government
  - Type: Council of the Municipality of the District of Shelburne
  - Warden: Penny Smith

Area
  - Land: 1,816.71 km^{2} (701.44 sq mi)

Population (2021)
  - Total: 4,336
  - Density: 2.4/km^{2} (6.2/sq mi)
  - Change 2016-21: ▲1.1%
- Time zone: UTC-4 (AST)
  - Summer (DST): UTC-3 (ADT)
- Dwellings: 2735
- Median Income*: $40,415 CDN
- Seat: Shelburne, Nova Scotia
- Website: Official website
- Median household income, 2005 (all households)

District of Shelburne, officially named the Municipality of the District of Shelburne, is a district municipality comprising the eastern section of Shelburne County, Nova Scotia, Canada, but does not include the Towns of Shelburne or Lockeport. Statistics Canada classifies the district municipality as a municipal district. It is home to the Bowers Meadows Wilderness Area.

== Demographics ==
Historical population
Year	Pop.	±%
1981	5,359	—
1986	5,365	+0.1%
1991	5,450	+1.6%
1996	5,315	−2.5%
2001	4,925	−7.3%
2006	4,828	−2.0%
2011	4,408	−8.7%
2016	4,288	−2.7%
2021	4,336	+1.1%
Source: Statistics Canada

In the 2021 Census of Population conducted by Statistics Canada, the Municipality of the District of Shelburne had a population of 4,336 living in 2,059 of its 2,735 total private dwellings, a change of 1.1% from its 2016 population of 4,288. With a land area of 1,816.71 km^{2} (701.44 sq mi), it had a population density of 2.4/km^{2} (6.2/sq mi) in 2021.

Mother tongue language (2006)
Language	Population	Pct (%)
English only	4,630	97.17%
Other languages	85	1.78%
French only	50	1.05%

Ethnic Groups (2006)
Ethnic Origin	Population	Pct (%)
Canadian	2,285	56.5%
English	1,135	28.1%
Scottish	825	20.4%
Irish	575	14.2%
German	760	18.8%
French	335	8.3%
Dutch (Netherlands)	215	5.3%
Welsh	145	3.6%
North American Indian	115	2.8%
Métis	115	2.8%

== Communities ==
The following communities are included within the Municipality of the District of Shelburne:

- Allendale
- Arnold
- Atlantic
- Birchtown
- Blanche
- Canada Hill
- Carleton Village
- Churchover
- Clyde River
- East Green Harbour
- East Jordan
- East Sable River
- East Side of Ragged Island
- Granite Village
- Greenwood
- Gunning Cove
- Indian Fields
- Ingomar
- Jordan Bay
- Jordan Branch
- Jordan Falls
- Jordan Ferry
- Little Harbour
- Little Port L'Hebert
- Lockeport Station
- Louis Head
- Lower Jordan Bay
- Lower Ohio
- Lower Sandy Point
- Lydgate
- McNutts Island
- Middle Ohio
- North East Harbour
- North West Harbour
- Ohio
- Osborne Harbour
- Pleasant Point
- Port Clyde
- Port L'Hebert
- Port Saxon
- Rockland
- Roseway
- Round Bay
- Sable River
- Sable River Station
- Sable River West
- Sandy Point
- Upper Clyde River
- Upper Ohio
- Welshtown
- West Green Harbour
- West Middle Sable
- Western Head

== Access routes ==
Highways and numbered routes that run through the district municipality, including external routes that start or finish at the municipal boundary:

- Highways
  - Hwy 103
- Trunk Routes
  - Trunk 3
- Collector Routes:
  - Route 203
  - Route 309
- External Routes:
  - None

== See also ==
- List of municipalities in Nova Scotia
