= List of historic places in Shelburne County =

Shelburne County is a county in the Canadian province of Nova Scotia. This list compiles historic places recognized by the Canadian Register of Historic Places within the county.

== List of historic places ==
Name	Address	Coordinates	Government recognition (CRHP №)	Wikidata ID	Image
James Atkins House	29 John Street; Lockeport NS	43°41′45″N 65°06′30″W	Lockeport municipality (15807)	Q137803558	Upload Photo
Moses Atkinson House	5 Kenney Road; Stoney Island NS	43°28′04″N 65°34′27″W	Stoney Island municipality (8699)	Q137803565	Upload Photo
Baccaro Point Lighthouse	Baccaro NS	43°27′06″N 65°28′16″W	Federal (13180)	Q28375736	More images
Herbert R. Banks House	3547 Highway 3 Barrington Passage NS	43°31′36″N 65°36′35″W	Barrington Passage municipality (8905)	Q137803590	Upload Photo
Barrington Municipal Library	3533 Highway 3 Barrington Passage NS	43°31′39″N 65°36′33″W	Barrington Passage municipality (8880)	Q85767960	Upload Photo
The Barrington Woolen Mill	2368 Highway 3 Barrington Head NS	43°34′04″N 65°34′42″W	Barrington Head municipality (8850)	Q24190413	More images
Gurden Bill Homestead	27 South Street; Lockeport NS	43°41′52″N 65°06′27″W	Nova Scotia (6570)	Q137803601	Upload Photo
Birchtown School	23 Birchtown Road; Birchtown NS	43°44′39″N 65°23′00″W	Nova Scotia (3206)	Q137803611	Upload Photo
Bower House	2274 Port LaTour Road; Upper Port La Tour NS	43°30′51″N 65°27′49″W	Upper Port La Tour municipality (8858)	Q137803615	Upload Photo
Cape Negro Church	28 Church Road; Cape Negro NS	43°33′14″N 65°26′38″W	Cape Negro municipality (8749)	Q137803622	Upload Photo
Cape Negro Hall	283 Blanche Road; Cape Negro NS	43°33′02″N 65°25′57″W	Cape Negro municipality (16182)	Q137803623	Upload Photo
Centerville Church	889 Highway 330; Centreville NS	43°29′00″N 65°36′39″W	Centreville municipality (8925)	Q137803627	Upload Photo
Chapel Hill Museum	5492 Highway 3 Shag Harbour NS	43°29′47″N 65°42′11″W	Shag Harbour municipality (9323)	Q136799238	Upload Photo
Charlotte Lane Café	13 Charlotte Lane; Shelburne NS	43°45′40″N 65°19′26″W	Shelburne municipality (7729)	Q137803637	More images
Church Street Cemetery	Church Street; Lockeport NS	43°41′46″N 65°06′37″W	Lockeport municipality (15709)	Q137803643	Upload Photo
Lewis P. Churchill House	35 Crest Street; Lockeport NS	43°41′50″N 65°06′45″W	Lockeport municipality (15819)	Q137803649	Upload Photo
Mrs. Josephine Coffin House	5 Old Town Road; Coffinscroft NS	43°32′52″N 65°33′16″W	Coffinscroft municipality (8689)	Q137803650	Upload Photo
Courtney House	114 Water Street; Shelburne NS	43°45′34″N 65°19′16″W	Shelburne municipality (15184)	Q137162879	Upload Photo
Cox's Warehouse	10 Ann Street; Shelburne NS	43°45′37″N 65°19′25″W	Shelburne municipality (7582)	Q102220563	More images
Coyle House	24 Dock Street; Shelburne NS	43°45′39″N 65°19′26″W	Shelburne municipality (7594)	Q137803657	Upload Photo
Crowell-Smith House	3271 No. 3 Highway; Barrington Passage NS	43°32′20″N 65°36′26″W	Nova Scotia (4116), Barrington Passage municipality (8751)	Q137162542	Upload Photo
Doane House	266 Villagedale Road; Coffinscroft NS	43°33′19″N 65°33′15″W	Nova Scotia (7808), Coffinscroft municipality (8820)	Q137803743	Upload Photo
The Dory Shop	11 Dock Street; Shelburne NS	43°45′39″N 65°19′27″W	Shelburne municipality (4103)	Q136481237	More images
The Esker	296 No. 3 Highway; Sable River NS	43°49′57″N 65°03′26″W	Nova Scotia (6486)	Q137803749	Upload Photo
Etherington-Robertson House	144 Hammond Street; Shelburne NS	43°45′45″N 65°19′13″W	Nova Scotia (3401), Shelburne municipality (7542)	Q137803663	Upload Photo
Fort St. Louis National Historic Site of Canada	Port La Tour; Barrington NS	43°29′44″N 65°28′17″W	Federal (18783)	Q3078046	Upload Photo
Joseph and Beryl Goreham House	Lot 1 Bear Point Road; Bear Point NS	43°30′10″N 65°39′42″W	Bear Point municipality (9319)	Q137803668	Upload Photo
George Gracie House / Cooper's Inn and Guest House	36 Dock Street; Shelburne NS	43°45′45″N 65°19′28″W	Nova Scotia (2446), Shelburne municipality (15168)	Q137162633	Upload Photo
Greenhill Community Church	2274 Port LaTour Road; Upper Port La Tour NS	43°30′51″N 65°27′49″W	Upper Port La Tour municipality (8721)	Q137803687	Upload Photo
Peter Guyon House	10 Charlotte Lane; Shelburne NS	43°45′40″N 65°19′26″W	Shelburne municipality (7829)	Q137803691	Upload Photo
Heritage Hall	28 John Street; Shelburne NS	43°45′45″N 65°19′18″W	Shelburne municipality (7544)	Q137803753	Upload Photo
The Arthur Homer House	2380 Highway No. 3 Barrington Head NS	43°34′03″N 65°34′45″W	Barrington Head municipality (8823)	Q137803759	Upload Photo
Knowles House	27 Knowles Road; Barrington Passage NS	43°31′21″N 65°36′57″W	Barrington Passage municipality (8874)	Q137803768	Upload Photo
Lighthouse	Cape Negro Island; Cape Negro NS	43°30′27″N 65°20′44″W	Federal (13032)	Q137803769	Upload Photo
Lighthouse (new)	Cape Sable NS	43°23′28″N 65°37′15″W	Federal (2982)	Q32831338	More images
Little School Museum	29 Locke Street; Lockeport NS	43°41′48″N 65°06′58″W	Lockeport municipality (15723)	Q137806079	Upload Photo
Locke Homestead	South Street; Lockeport NS	43°41′50″N 65°06′30″W	Nova Scotia (6568)	Q137806099	Upload Photo
Colin Locke House	45 South Street; Lockeport NS	43°41′51″N 65°06′30″W	Lockeport municipality (15818)	Q137806109	Upload Photo
Jacob Locke Homestead	31 South Street; Lockeport NS	43°41′52″N 65°06′28″W	Nova Scotia (7440)	Q137806124	Upload Photo
John Locke Homestead	23 South Street; Lockeport NS	43°41′52″N 65°06′26″W	Nova Scotia (6571)	Q137806139	Upload Photo
Jonathan Locke House	20 North Street; Lockeport NS	43°41′58″N 65°06′49″W	Lockeport municipality (15902)	Q137806172	Upload Photo
Lockeport Cenotaph	Hall and Spruce Streets; Lockeport NS	43°41′54″N 65°06′52″W	Lockeport municipality (15701)	Q137806188	Upload Photo
Lyle House	72 Port LaTour Road; Port Clyde NS	43°30′45″N 65°29′32″W	Port Clyde municipality (8670)	Q137806213	Upload Photo
MacMullen Oil Skin Factory	2456 Highway No. 3 Barrington NS	43°33′59″N 65°34′56″W	Nova Scotia (2200)	Q137806221	Upload Photo
Patrick McDonough House	28 Dock Street; Shelburne NS	43°45′41″N 65°19′27″W	Shelburne municipality (7581)	Q137806233	Upload Photo
Joseph McGill Shipbuilding and Transportation Company Office	10 John Street; Shelburne NS	43°45′42″N 65°19′27″W	Nova Scotia (3546), Shelburne municipality (7583)	Q137162852	More images
Phyllisa Mundell House / Willow Grove	2133 Highway 3 Barrington NS	43°33′52″N 65°33′56″W	Barrington municipality (8718)	Q137806251	Upload Photo
New Jerusalem Farm at McNutt's Island	McNutt's Island Road; McNutts Island NS	43°39′14″N 65°18′05″W	Nova Scotia (14903)	Q137806260	More images
Gilbert Nickerson House	5493 Highway No. 3 Shag Harbour NS	43°29′47″N 65°42′10″W	Shag Harbour municipality (9186)	Q137806310	Upload Photo
May Nickerson House	6648 Highway 3 Lower Woods Harbour NS	43°31′34″N 65°44′01″W	Lower Woods Harbour municipality (9192)	Q137806318	Upload Photo
Old Barrington Meeting House National Historic Site of Canada	2408 Highway No. 3 Barrington NS	43°34′00″N 65°34′47″W	Federal (11708), Nova Scotia (1263)	Q23019153	More images
Old Court House	2401 Highway No. 3 Barrington NS	43°34′00″N 65°34′46″W	Barrington municipality (8957)	Q137806378	Upload Photo
Old Kirk Burying Ground	36 John Street; Shelburne NS	43°45′48″N 65°19′13″W	Nova Scotia (7954)	Q137806388	Upload Photo
Enos W. Page House	460 Brighton Road; Lockeport NS	43°42′56″N 65°07′24″W	Lockeport municipality (15904)	Q137806393	Upload Photo
Rippin House	6 St. Patrick Lane; Shelburne NS	43°45′35″N 65°19′24″W	Shelburne municipality (7810)	Q137806424	Upload Photo
Ross-Thomson House	9 Charlotte Lane; Shelburne NS	43°45′40″N 65°19′26″W	Nova Scotia (1395), Shelburne municipality (4137)	Q136484235	More images
Ryer-Davis House	near the head of the northwest arm of Shelburne Harbour; Shelburne NS	43°46′16″N 65°19′51″W	Nova Scotia (5382), Shelburne municipality (7540)	Q137806437	Upload Photo
Sandy Point Lighthouse	Sandy Point Road; Shelburne NS	43°42′00″N 65°19′00″W	Federal (9508), Nova Scotia (14170)	Q28375862	More images
Sargent-Homer-Nodwell House	2380 No. 3 Highway; Barrington NS	43°34′04″N 65°34′45″W	Nova Scotia (7285)	Q137806457	Upload Photo
Shakespear House	17 George Street; Shelburne NS	43°45′33″N 65°19′17″W	Nova Scotia (3149), Shelburne municipality (7580)	Q137162562	Upload Photo
Shelburne County Museum	20 Dock Street; Shelburne NS	43°45′37″N 65°19′26″W	Shelburne municipality (7595)	Q136802358	Upload Photo
Archelaus Smith Museum	915 Highway 330; Centreville NS	43°28′58″N 65°36′36″W	Centreville municipality (8766)	Q137806464	Upload Photo
William Stalker Homestead	43 South Street; Lockeport NS	43°41′50″N 65°06′29″W	Nova Scotia (6569)	Q137806488	Upload Photo
Temperance Hall	5521 Highway 3 Shag Harbour NS	43°29′44″N 65°42′14″W	Shag Harbour municipality (9320)	Q137806527	Upload Photo
Trinity United Church	36 John Street; Shelburne NS	43°45′48″N 65°19′13″W	Shelburne municipality (7953)	Q137806536	Upload Photo
The United Baptist Church	7029 Highway 3 Upper Woods Harbour NS	43°32′34″N 65°44′03″W	Upper Woods Harbour municipality (8954)	Q137806545	Upload Photo
Wesley United Church	2280 Highway 3 Barrington Head NS	43°34′03″N 65°34′25″W	Barrington Head municipality (9312)	Q137806556	Upload Photo
White-Irwin House	119 Water Street; Shelburne NS	43°45′36″N 65°19′18″W	Nova Scotia (7585), Shelburne municipality (7586)	Q137162866	Upload Photo
Wilson House	67 Snows Road; Barrington Passage NS	43°31′44″N 65°36′44″W	Barrington Passage municipality (8875)	Q137806567	Upload Photo

== See also ==
- List of historic places in Nova Scotia
- List of National Historic Sites of Canada in Nova Scotia
- Heritage Property Act (Nova Scotia)
