= Page House =

Page House may refer to:

== Canada ==
- Enos W. Page House, Lockeport, Nova Scotia, a historic place in Shelburne County, Nova Scotia

== United States ==
- Page House (Caltech), California, a residential house at the California Institute of Technology
- Henry H. Page House, Vermont, Illinois, listed on the National Register of Historic Places (NRHP)
- William Page House, Glasgow, Kentucky, NRHP-listed
- Page House (Milton, Kentucky), NRHP-listed
- Christopher Page House, Bedford, Massachusetts
- Nathaniel Page House, Bedford, Massachusetts
- Thomas D. Page House, Chicopee, Massachusetts
- H. P. Page House, Newton, Massachusetts
- Henry G. Page House, Fergus Falls, Minnesota, a former National Register of Historic Places listing in Otter Tail County, Minnesota
- Page House (Cohecton, New York)
- Williamson Page House, Morrisville, North Carolina
- Judge C. H. Page House, Astoria, Oregon, a National Register of Historic Places listing in Clatsop County, Oregon
- Paul D. Page House, Bastrop, Texas, a National Register of Historic Places listing in Bastrop County, Texas
- Daniel R. and Sophia G. Page House, Page Ranch, Utah, NRHP-listed
- Thomas Nelson Page House, Washington, D.C.

== See also ==
- Page-Bell House, Milton, Kentucky, a National Register of Historic Places listing in Trimble County, Kentucky
- Bigelow-Page House, Skowhegan, Maine
- Havens-Page House, North Omaha, Nebraska
- Sharp-Page House, NRHP-listed
- Abbott-Page House, Milan, Ohio
- Page-Gilbert House, Austin, Texas
- Page-Vawter House, Ansted, West Virginia
