= Nova Scotia Route 203 =

Highway in Nova Scotia, Canada

Route 203

Route information
- Maintained by Nova Scotia Department of Transportation and Infrastructure Renewal
- Length: 83 km (52 mi)

Major junctions
- West end: Route 340 / Trunk 40 in Carleton
- Hwy 103 in Shelburne
- East end: Trunk 3 in Shelburne

Location
- Country: Canada
- Province: Nova Scotia
- Counties: Yarmouth, Shelburne

Highway system
- Provincial highways in Nova Scotia; 100-series
← Route 202	→ Route 204

Route 203 is a collector road in the Canadian province of Nova Scotia.

It is located in Shelburne and Yarmouth Counties and runs through a sparsely populated area including Argyle Municipality from Shelburne at Trunk 3 along the border of the Tobeatic Wilderness Area through Kemptville and connects to Nova Scotia Route 340 at Carleton. The village of East Kemptville is the only part of a municipality in Nova Scotia disconnected from the rest of the district by roads, and accessible only from other districts via Highway 203.

Route 203 is considered the loneliest road in the province because it has the longest uninhabited stretch of any paved highway in Nova Scotia.

== Communities ==
- Carleton
- Kemptville
- East Kemptville
- Sluice Point
- Flintstone Rock
- Welshtown
- Upper Ohio
- Middle Ohio
- Lower Ohio
- Shelburne

== Parks & Protected Area ==
- The Islands Provincial Park
- Tobeatic Wilderness Area
- Indian Fields Provincial Park Reserve

== Businesses ==
- Trout Point Lodge of Nova Scotia
- Kemptville Corner Store
- Black Bull Resources White Rock Mine

== See also ==
- List of Nova Scotia provincial highways
