= McGray =

McGray is a surname. Notable people with the surname include:

- Asa McGray (1780–1843), Canadian Free Will Baptist minister
- Michael Wayne McGray (born 1965), Canadian serial killer
- Nehemiah McGray (1838–1887), Canadian ship's captain, merchant, and politician, grandson of Asa McGray
