= List of shipwrecks in June 1838 =

The list of shipwrecks in June 1838 includes ships sunk, foundered, wrecked, grounded, or otherwise lost during June 1838.

== 1 June ==
List of shipwrecks: 1 June 1838
Ship	State	Description
Gasper	United States	The ship was wrecked in the Hooghly River. She was on a voyage from Calcutta, India to Boston, Massachusetts.

== 2 June ==
List of shipwrecks: 2 June 1838
Ship	State	Description
Royal George	United Kingdom	The full-rigged ship was wrecked on a reef off Cape Ray, Newfoundland, British North America. Her crew were rescued by Blessing, Marys and Tom Bowline (all United Kingdom). She was on a voyage from London to Quebec City, Lower Canada, British North America.
St. Jacques	France	The ship ran aground on the Goodwin Sands, Kent, United Kingdom. She was on a voyage from Rouen, Seine-Inférieure to Sunderland, County Durham, United Kingdom. St. Jacques was refloated and put into The Downs.

== 3 June ==
List of shipwrecks: 3 June 1838
Ship	State	Description
Tulloch Castle	United Kingdom	The ship was driven ashore at South Foreland, Kent. She was on a voyage from Newcastle upon Tyne, Northumberland to Algiers, Algeria. Tulloch Castle was refloated and put into Deal, Kent.

== 5 June ==
List of shipwrecks: 5 June 1838
Ship	State	Description
Mary Jane	United Kingdom	The ship foundered off the Calf of Man, Isle of Man. She was on a voyage from Newry, County Antrim to Flint.

== 6 June ==
List of shipwrecks: 6 June 1838
Ship	State	Description
Waterwitch	United Kingdom	The ship foundered whilst on a voyage from Barbados to Saint Lucia. Her crew were rescued.

== 7 June ==
List of shipwrecks: 7 June 1838
Ship	State	Description
Dover	United Kingdom	The ship was wrecked on Scatterie Island, Nova Scotia, British North America with the loss of five of her crew.

== 8 June ==
List of shipwrecks: 8 June 1838
Ship	State	Description
Dee	United Kingdom	The schooner was driven ashore near Hoylake, Lancashire.

== 9 June ==
List of shipwrecks: 9 June 1838
Ship	State	Description
Ceres	United Kingdom	The ship foundered in the North Sea off Spurn Point, Yorkshire. Her crew survived. She was on a voyage from Porth Madog, Caernarfonshire to Sunderland, County Durham.

== 10 June ==
List of shipwrecks: 10 June 1838
Ship	State	Description
Ædicia	United Kingdom	The ship was wrecked near the Hook Lighthouse, County Wexford. She was on a voyage from Fethard-on-Sea to Llanelly, Glamorgan.
Good Intent	United Kingdom	The fishing smack ran aground off Stroma, Orkney Islands. She was refloated on 12 June and put int Stromness, Orkney Islands for repairs.
Norges Haab	Norway	The ship was wrecked near "Torckow".

== 11 June ==
List of shipwrecks: 11 June 1838
Ship	State	Description
Jason	Imperial Russian Navy	The steamship was driven ashore and wrecked on the coast of Circassia with the loss of all hands.

== 12 June ==
List of shipwrecks: 12 June 1838
Ship	State	Description
David	United Kingdom	The ship was driven ashore at Helsingør, Denmark. She was on a voyage from Königsberg, Prussia to London. David was refloated on 17 June and resumed her voyage.
Ruth	United States	The ship was sighted whilst on a voyage from Gibraltar to Baltimore, Maryland. No further trace, presumed foundered with the loss of all hands.
Susannah	United Kingdom	The brig was driven ashore on Saint Domingo.

== 13 June ==
List of shipwrecks: 13 June 1838
Ship	State	Description
Montezuma	France	The ship was wrecked at "Onin", Africa. Her crew were rescued.
Rebecca	United Kingdom	The ship ran aground and sank at Figueira da Foz, Portugal. She was on a voyage from Figueira da Foz to Newfoundland. Rebecca was later refloated and taken into Figueira da Foz for repairs.
Union	United Kingdom	The smack was driven ashore at Huna, Caithness. She was on a voyage from Thurso, Caithness to Leith, Lothian. Union was refloated and resumed her voyage.
Vrouw Maria	Flag unknown	The ship was run down and sunk south of Helsingør, Denmark by Pallas (United States). She was on a voyage from Pärnu, Russia to Porto, Portugal.

== 14 June ==
List of shipwrecks: 14 June 1838
Ship	State	Description
Pulaski	United States	Pulaski. The paddle steamer suffered a boiler explosion and sank in the Atlantic Ocean 30 nautical miles (56 km) off the coast of North Carolina with the loss of 128 lives. About 59 people were rescued.

== 15 June ==
List of shipwrecks: 15 June 1838
Ship	State	Description
Avon	United Kingdom	The ship was wrecked on the Double-Headed Shot Keys. Her crew were rescued. She was on a voyage from Matanzas, Cuba to Saint Petersburg, Russia.

== 16 June ==
List of shipwrecks: 16 June 1838
Ship	State	Description
Rhine	United Kingdom	The ship was driven ashore on "Ruberg". She was on a voyage from Stockton-on-Tees, County Durham to Saint Petersburg, Russia. Rhine was later refloated and resumed her voyage.
Washington	United States	The steamboat was destroyed by fire in Lake Erie 3 nautical miles (5.6 km) north of Silver Creek, New York with the loss of about 50 lives.

== 17 June ==
List of shipwrecks: 17 June 1838
Ship	State	Description
Thomas	United Kingdom	The ship was driven ashore at Scalloway, Shetland Islands.

== 18 June ==
List of shipwrecks: 18 June 1838
Ship	State	Description
Frau Margaretha	Hamburg	The ship was driven ashore at Dunbar, Lothian, United Kingdom. She was on a voyage from Alloa, Clackmannanshire, United Kingdom to Hamburg. Frau Margaretha was refloated on 20 June and taken into Dunbar.
Lovely Cruizer	United Kingdom	The brig ran aground in the Vlie. She was on a voyage from London to Bremen. Lovely Cruizer was refloated and taken into Terschelling, Friesland, Netherlands.
Two Friends	United Kingdom	The ship ran aground on the Ramsdale Scar and was damaged. She was on a voyage from Sunderland, County Durham to Scarborough, Yorkshire.

== 19 June ==
List of shipwrecks: 19 June 1838
Ship	State	Description
Belfast	United Kingdom	The paddle steamer struck the pier and her engine was severely damaged at Shoreham-by-Sea, Sussex. She was on a voyage from Dieppe, Seine-Inférieure to Shoreham-by-Sea.

== 20 June ==
List of shipwrecks: 20 June 1838
Ship	State	Description
Charlotte	United Kingdom	The schooner ran aground on the Shipwash Sand, in the North Sea off the coast of Essex. She was on a voyage from Newcastle upon Tyne, Northumberland to Sidmouth, Devon. Charlotte was refloated with assistance from the brig Hebe and escorted into Harwich, Essex in a leaky condition.
Despatch	United Kingdom	The ship sprang a leak and was beached at Newhaven, Sussex, where she was wrecked.
Sirio	Kingdom of the Two Sicilies	The ship was lost in Mullion Bay.

== 21 June ==
List of shipwrecks: 21 June 1838
Ship	State	Description
Fanny	(United Kingdom of Great Britain and Ireland) Van Diemen's Land	The ship was driven ashore and wrecked 50 nautical miles (93 km) east of Port Adelaide, South Australia. She was on a voyage from Hobart to King George's Sound, Swan River Colony.
Justinian	United Kingdom	The ship was holed by an anchor in the River Orwell and was beached at Harwich, Essex.
Mary or Mary Coxon	United Kingdom	The ship was driven ashore on Öland, Sweden. She was on a voyage from South Shields, County Durham to Saint Petersburg, Russia. She was refloated several weeks later and taken into Kalmar.
Theodore	France	The ship was wrecked on the Goodwin Sands, Kent, United Kingdom. Her crew were rescued. She was on a voyage from Cherbourg, Seine-Inférieure to Sunderland, County Durham, United Kingdom.

== 22 June ==
List of shipwrecks: 22 June 1838
Ship	State	Description
Eliza	United Kingdom	The ship was driven ashore at Cork. She was on a voyage from Newport, Monmouthshire to Cork.
Julia	United Kingdom	The ship was struck by lightning and destroyed off Key West, Florida Territory. Her crew survived. She was on a voyage from Mobile, Alabama, United States to Liverpool, Lancashire.
Vrouw Tantje	Hamburg	The ship was lost off Neuwerk. She was on a voyage from Hartlepool, County Durham, United Kingdom to Hamburg

== 23 June ==
List of shipwrecks: 23 June 1838
Ship	State	Description
Herefordshire	United Kingdom	The ship ran aground on the Futtah Sand. She was later refloated and taken into Calcutta, India for repairs.

== 24 June ==
List of shipwrecks: 24 June 1838
Ship	State	Description
Anna Margaretha	Russia	The ship struck a submerged rock and put into "Ulvesand", where she sank. She was on a voyage from Riga to Antwerp, Belgium.
Industry	United Kingdom	The ship was driven ashore at Round Bay, Nova Scotia, British North America. All on board were rescued. She was on a voyage from Dublin to Saint Andrews, New Brunswick, British North America. Industry was refloated on 13 July and resumed her voyage.
Jane	United Kingdom	The ship was driven ashore at Round Bay. All on board were rescued.
Fanny	United Kingdom	The ship was run down and sunk 6 leagues (18 nautical miles (33 km)) off The Lizard, Cornwall. Her crew were rescued. She was on a voyage from Arundel, Sussex to Tenby, Pembrokeshire.

== 26 June ==
List of shipwrecks: 26 June 1838
Ship	State	Description
Enigheden	Sweden	The ship was driven ashore at Helsingør, Denmark. She was on a voyage from Jersey, Channel Islands to Sundsvall. Enigheden was later refloated.
Neptuno	United Kingdom	The brig ran aground on the English Bank, off the coast of Argentina.

== 27 June ==
List of shipwrecks: 27 June 1838
Ship	State	Description
Riby Grove	United Kingdom	The whaler was crushed by ice and sank. Her crew were rescued by Altona (Hamburg) and Perseverance (United Kingdom).

== 28 June ==
List of shipwrecks: 28 June 1838
Ship	State	Description
Ann	United Kingdom	The ship ran aground on the Lasolle Reef. All on board were rescued. She was on a voyage from London to New Orleans, Louisiana, United States.
Sicilian	United Kingdom	The ship was sunk by ice off Venison Tickle, Labrador, British North America. Her crew were rescued. She was on a voyage from St. John's, Newfoundland to Indian Tickle, Labrador.

== 29 June ==
List of shipwrecks: 29 June 1838
Ship	State	Description
Seraph	United Kingdom	The brig was wrecked on Brion Island, Magdalen Islands, Lower Canada, British North America. Her crew were rescued. She was on a voyage from Richibucto, New Brunswick, British North America to Newcastle upon Tyne, Northumberland.

== 30 June ==
List of shipwrecks: 30 June 1838
Ship	State	Description
Page	United Kingdom	The ship was driven ashore at Wrangle, Lincolnshire. She was on a voyage from Sligo to London. Page was refloated on 5 July and resumed her voyage.

== Unknown date ==
List of shipwrecks: Unknown date in June 1838
Ship	State	Description
Emma	United Kingdom	The ship was driven ashore and severely damaged at Adelaide, South Australia in mid-July. She was on a voyage from Sydney, New South Wales to Adelaide.
Franklin	United States	The ship was holed by an anchor and sank in the Mississippi River before 11 June. She was on a voyage from New Orleans, Louisiana to Havre de Grâce, Seine-Inférieure, France.
Hero	United Kingdom	The ship was driven ashore on Skomer, Pembrokeshire and was abandoned. She was on a voyage from Bristol, Gloucestershire to Altona, Hamburg. Hero was taken into Milford Haven, Pembrokeshire on 11 June.
Maria	United Kingdom	The ship was wrecked at Benin before 1 July. Her crew were rescued.
Marina	United Kingdom	The ship was sunk by ice in the Atlantic Ocean before 21 May. Her crew were rescued. She was on a voyage from Cardiff, Glamorgan to Quebec City, Lower Canada, British North America.
Milton	United Kingdom	The ship was driven ashore at Old Bic Harbour, Lower Canada. She was on a voyage from Jamaica to Quebec City.
Morning Star	United Kingdom	The ship collided with Susan and Jane (United Kingdom) and was abandoned in the Grand Banks of Newfoundland before 8 June. Her crew were rescued by Susan and Jane. Morning Star was on a voyage from Saint John, New Brunswick, British North America to Belfast, County Antrim.
Muscogee	United States	The steamboat was wrecked.
Norman	United Kingdom	The ship was driven ashore and severely damaged at Peterhead, Aberdeenshire. She was on a voyage from Memel, Prussia to Dublin. Norman was refloated on 6 June and taken into Peterhead.
Sarah	(United Kingdom of Great Britain and Ireland) New South Wales	The coaster was wrecked on the coast of South Australia between Endeavour Bay and Portland Bay.
Sir Archibald Campbell	United Kingdom	The ship was driven ashore and wrecked at Miramichi, New Brunswick, British North America before 26 June.
Varennes	(United Kingdom of Great Britain and Ireland) British North America	The steamboat was destroyed by fire.
Zealous	United Kingdom	The ship was driven ashore at Redcar, Yorkshire. She was on a voyage from Middlesbrough, Yorkshire to a port in Lincolnshire. She was refloated on 30 June and taken into Hartlepool, County Durham in a leaky condition.
