= List of shipwrecks in July 1873 =

The list of shipwrecks in July 1873 includes ships sunk, foundered, grounded, or otherwise lost during July 1873.

== 1 July ==
List of shipwrecks: 1 July 1873
Ship	State	Description
Ariel	United Kingdom	The barque sprang a leak and sank 13 nautical miles (24 km) off the mouth of the Nun River. Her crew were rescued by the steamship RMS Loanda (United Kingdom). Ariel was on a voyage from Liverpool, Lancashire to Lagos, Africa.
Express	United Kingdom	The ship ran aground at Lagos, Africa and was wrecked. She was on a voyage from Africa to Falmouth, Cornwall.
Jason	United Kingdom	The ship was driven ashore . She was on a voyage from Saint-Malo, Ille-et-Vilaine, France to Newport, Monmouthshire. She was refloated on 8 July and taken in to Ilfracombe, Devon.
Tromp	Netherlands	The steamship ran aground off Cape Räz Ghärib, Egypt. She was on a voyage from the Nieuw Diep to Batavia, Netherlands East Indies. She was refloated on 10 August and towed in to Suez, Egypt by the tug Timsah (United Kingdom). Tromp was subsequently repaired and returned to service.

== 2 July ==
List of shipwrecks: 2 July 1873
Ship	State	Description
Olga	United Kingdom	The brig was wrecked "on Scarpanto Island". She was on a voyage Gibraltar to Oran, Algeria.
Princess of Wales	United Kingdom	The barque was wrecked in Dundalk Bay near the Dundalk Lighthouse. Her sixteen crew survived.

== 3 July ==
List of shipwrecks: 3 July 1873
Ship	State	Description
Frederick Peterson	Netherlands	The barque ran aground off Karawang, Netherlands East Indies. She was on a voyage from Batavia to Samarang. She was consequently condemned.
Provence	France	The steamship ran aground at Saigon, French Indo-China. She was on a voyage from Marseille, Bouches-du-Rhône to a Chinese port. She was refloated and taken in to Saigon, where she was repaired. She subsequently resumed her voyage.
Royal Standard	United Kingdom	The schooner ran aground off Cardiff, Glamorgan. She was refloated with the assistance of a tug and beached at Penarth, Glamorgan.

== 4 July ==
List of shipwrecks: 4 July 1873
Ship	State	Description
Elizabeth	United Kingdom	The smack was driven ashore and wrecked at Torrylin, Isle of Arran.
Unnamed	Flag unknown	The schooner ran aground on the North Spit, in Liverpool Bay.

== 5 July ==
List of shipwrecks: 5 July 1873
Ship	State	Description
Albatross	Belgium	The steamship ran aground at Terneuzen, Zeeland, Netherlands. She was on a voyage from Bône, Algeria to Antwerp. She was refloated.
City of Washington	United Kingdom	The steamship was wrecked off Little Port l'Hébert, Nova Scotia, Canada. All 567 people on board were rescued. She was on a voyage from Liverpool, Lancashire to New York, United States.
Golden Dream	United Kingdom	The ship ran aground at New York. She was refloated.
Ironsides	United States	The ship ran aground on the Goodwin Sands, Kent, United Kingdom. She was on a voyage from a Baltic port to Bristol, Gloucestershire, United Kingdom.
Mary	United Kingdom	The fishing smack was driven ashore and wrecked at Ardglass, County Down.

== 7 July ==
List of shipwrecks: 7 July 1873
Ship	State	Description
Christiania	Norway	The steamship was driven ashore on Vlieland, Friesland, Netherlands.
India	United Kingdom	The ship ran aground on the Girdler Sand. She was refloated and resumed her voyage.
Jane	United Kingdom	The ship sprang a leak and was beached at Lindisfarne, Northumberland. She was on a voyage from Tayport, Fife to Stockton-on-Tees, County Durham.

== 8 July ==
List of shipwrecks: 8 July 1873
Ship	State	Description
Clara	Netherlands	The ship sank at Katendrecht, South Holland. She was on a voyage from Rotterdam, South Holland to New York, United States.
Guiona	Canada	The ship ran aground in Lake Saint Pierre. She was on a voyage from Sydney, Nova Scotia to Montreal, Quebec.
Hilda	United Kingdom	The steamship ran aground on the Middle Sand, in the Humber. She was on a voyage from Hull, Yorkshire to Kronstadt, Russia. She was refloated and resumed her voyage.
William	United Kingdom	The brigantine foundered in the North Sea off Aldbrough, Yorkshire. Her crew survived. She was on a voyage from the River Tyne to Exeter, Devon.

== 9 July ==
List of shipwrecks: 9 July 1873
Ship	State	Description
Jeune Harriet	France	The lugger foundered off Portsoy, Aberdeenshire, United Kingdom. Her crew survived.
Singapore	United Kingdom	The steamship was driven ashore 63 nautical miles (117 km) west of Cape Guardafui, Majeerteen Sultanate with the loss of sixteen of her 52 crew. The vessel was pillaged by Arabs. She was on a voyage from Singapore, Straits Settlements for Suez, Egypt.
St. George	United Kingdom	The ship foundered in the Irish Sea northwards of Dublin. Her crew were rescued. She was on a voyage from Havre de Grâce, Seine-Inférieure, France to Belfast, County Antrim.

== 10 July ==
List of shipwrecks: 10 July 1873
Ship	State	Description
Calcium	United Kingdom	The steamship ran aground at Terneuzen, Zeeland, Netherlands. She was on a voyage from Newcastle upon Tyne, Northumberland to Ghent, East Flanders, Belgium. She was refloated.
Glenralloch	United Kingdom	The ship ran aground on the Steep Breast, in the River Wyre. She was on a voyage from Miramichi, New Brunswick, Canada to Fleetwood, Lancashire.

== 11 July ==
List of shipwrecks: 11 July 1873
Ship	State	Description
Crown Prince	United Kingdom	The ship ran aground in Lake Saint Pierre. She was on a voyage from Montreal, Quebec, Canada to Liverpool, Lancashire.
De Vrouw Johanna	Netherlands	The lugger ran aground at Aberdeen, United Kingdom. She was boarded by Customs officers, who found a greater quantity of cigars and tobacco on board than had been previously declared. They also found undeclared wine and spirits. Her eight crew were arrested for smuggling and the ship was seized. She was refloated and taken in to Aberdeen harbour.
Mesopotamia	United Kingdom	The steamship ran aground at Isola Point, Malta. She was on a voyage from London to Bussorah, Persia. She was refloated and resumed her voyage.
Sainte Marie Joseph	France	The fishing boat struck a sunken rock and sank at Berwick upon Tweed, Northumberland, United Kingdom. Her crew were rescued.

== 12 July ==
List of shipwrecks: 12 July 1873
Ship	State	Description
Aldebaran	United Kingdom	The ship ran aground on the Spit of Passage, off the coast of County Waterford.
Eringo	United Kingdom	The schooner ran aground on the Burbo Bank, in Liverpool Bay. She was refloated with the assistance of some tugs and beached at Egremont, Lancashire.
Mozambique	United Kingdom	The ship was driven ashore 5 nautical miles (9.3 km) north of "Arzilla", Morocco. She was consequently condemned.
Nazaret	Portugal	The barque foundered in the Atlantic Ocean off the Canary Islands. Her crew survived. She was on a voyage from Lisbon to Saint Paul de Loanda, Portuguese West Africa.

== 14 July ==
List of shipwrecks: 14 July 1873
Ship	State	Description
Senior	United Kingdom	The barque was abandoned in the South Atlantic. Her ten crew were rescued by Excelsior (Germany).

== 15 July ==
List of shipwrecks: 15 July 1873
Ship	State	Description
Bortolina	United Kingdom	The ship was driven ashore and wrecked on Cape Breton Island, Nova Scotia, Canada. She was on a voyage from Larne, County Antrim to New York, United States.
Dalkeith	United Kingdom	The schooner was driven ashore on Nyord, Denmark. Her crew were rescued. She was on a voyage from Danzig, Germany to Scrabster, Caithness. She was refloated and resumed her voyage.
Marie Louise	Norway	The brig foundered in the North Sea with the loss of all but her captain. He was rescued by Lara (United Kingdom). Marie Louise was on a voyage from Fredrikstad, Denmark to Dunkirk, Nord. France.
Merritt	United Kingdom	The ship was wrecked on Staten Island, New York.

== 17 July ==
List of shipwrecks: 17 July 1873
Ship	State	Description
Maraldi	United Kingdom	The steamship struck a sunken rock and was beached at Bahia, Brazil.

== 19 July ==
List of shipwrecks: 19 July 1873
Ship	State	Description
Hans Smith	Sweden	The ship was wrecked at Grassy Point, New York, United States. She was on a voyage from Gothenburg, Sweden to Quebec City, Canada.

== 20 July ==
List of shipwrecks: 20 July 1873
Ship	State	Description
Dux, and Ibis	Ottoman Empire	The lighters collided with the steamship Nelio (United Kingdom) at Sulina. Dux was beached, Ibis sank.
Governor Wynyard	New Zealand	The paddle steamer sprang a leak and was beached at Stanley, Tasmania. She was on a voyage from Duck River to Launceston, Tasmania
Mary Jane	United Kingdom	The barque ran aground on the Middle Mouse Sand, in Liverpool Bay. She capsized and sank. Her crew were rescued. Mary Jane was on a voyage from Liverpool, Lancashire to Sydney, Nova Scotia, Canada. She was refloated with assistance from the tug Black Prince (United Kingdom) and was beached at Beaumaris, Anglesey.
M. M. Peter	United Kingdom	The ship was lost off Pará, Brazil. Her crew were rescued. She was on a voyage from Cardiff, Glamorgan to Pará.
Unnamed'	United Kingdom	The sloop sank in the River Derwent.

== 21 July ==
List of shipwrecks: 21 July 1873
Ship	State	Description
Caspar Wild	Norway	The brig was abandoned in the Atlantic Ocean (48°13′N 36°00′W). Her crew were rescued by the steamship Spain (United States). Caspar Wild was on a voyage from Newcastle upon Tyne, Northumberland, United Kingdom to Philadelphia, Pennsylvania, United States.
Celine	United Kingdom	The ship was driven ashore near Granville, Manche, France. She was on a voyage from Great Yarmouth, Norfolk to Pontorson, Manche.
China	United Kingdom	The schooner was driven ashore in a typhoon at "Soonghing". China.
Eleanor Alice	United Kingdom	The schooner was abandoned off Porthgain, Pembrokeshire and foundered. She was on a voyage from Penzance, Cornwall to Portmadoc, Caernarfonshire.
Lelan	France	The ship was beached at Ryde, Isle of Wight, United Kingdom having sprang a leak the previous day.
Rebecca	Germany	The brig was driven ashore in a typhoon at "Soonghing".
Shaftesbury	United States	The steamship was driven ashore in a typhoon at "Soonghing".
Sura	Germany	The barque was driven ashore in a typhoon at Amoy, China. She was refloated.
Tarra	United Kingdom	The barque was driven ashore in a typhoon at "Soonghing".
Taunton	United Kingdom	The full-rigged ship was driven ashore in a typhoon at Amoy. She was refloated.
Vica	United Kingdom	The schooner was driven ashore in a typhoon at "Soonghing".
Vision	United Kingdom	The brig was driven ashore in a typhoon at Amoy. She was refloated.
William	United Kingdom	The brigantine was beached at Penarth, Glamorgan.

== 22 July ==
List of shipwrecks: 22 July 1873
Ship	State	Description
Britannia	United Kingdom	The ship foundered between the Farne Islands, Northumberland and St. Abbs Head, Berwickshire, according to a message in a bottle that washed up near Strömstad, Sweden in late October.
Meteor	New Zealand	The 43-ton schooner ran aground on a sandspit at the mouth of the Whanganui River.
St. Joseph	France	The fishing lugger foundered in the North Sea. Her crew were rescued by a Scottish fishing vessel.

== 24 July ==
List of shipwrecks: 24 July 1873
Ship	State	Description
Azalea	United Kingdom	The steamship was driven ashore on Perim, Aden Settlement. She was on a voyage from Bombay, India to London.

== 25 July ==
List of shipwrecks: 25 July 1873
Ship	State	Description
Active	United Kingdom	The schooner foundered in St George's Channel. Her crew were rescued. She was on a voyage from Liverpool, Lancashire to Gorleston, Suffolk.
Perseverance	Germany	The barque was wrecked on a reef off Tamatave, Madagascar. Her crew were rescued.

== 27 July ==
List of shipwrecks: 27 July 1873
Ship	State	Description
Achilles	Germany	The barque was lost in the White Sea. She was on a voyage from London, United Kingdom to Onega, Russia.
Creole	United Kingdom	The barque was driven ashore on the Calf of Man, Isle of Man. She was on a voyage from Liverpool, Lancashire to Miramichi, New Brunswick, Canada. She was refloated and put in to Belfast, County Antrim in a leaky condition.
Formosa	Germany	The brig was lost at sea. Her crew were rescued. She was on a voyage from Quebec City, Canada to London, United Kingdom.

== 28 July ==
List of shipwrecks: 28 July 1873
Ship	State	Description
Active	United Kingdom	The schooner foundered off Lundy Island, Devon.
Conception	Spain	The barque was driven ashore in Bootle Bay. She was on a voyage from Matanzas, Cuba to Liverpool, Lancashire, United Kingdom. She was refloated and towed in to Liverpool.
Tanner	United Kingdom	The brig was wrecked on the Mouse Sand, in the Thames Estuary off the coast of Essex. She was on a voyage from London to Newcastle upon Tyne, Northumberland.
Union	New Zealand	The 158-ton brig was driven ashore in Whangaroa Bay in a severe gale.

== 30 July ==
List of shipwrecks: 30 July 1873
Ship	State	Description
Albert	United Kingdom	The ship was driven ashore at Lingan, Nova Scotia, Canada. She was on a voyage from Quebec City, Canada to Queenstown, County Cork.
Flor de Augra	Portugal	The ship ran aground at Bangor, Maine, United States.
Rangitoto	New Zealand	The steamer, which was carrying passengers between Nelson and Wellington, hit a reef near Cape Jackson in the Marlborough Sounds, ripping a hole in her side. The ship was deliberately beached in Port Gore to save the lives of those on board.

== 31 July ==
List of shipwrecks: 31 July 1873
Ship	State	Description
Rovena	United Kingdom	The ship ran aground on the Goodwin Sands, Kent.
Tonsberghaus	Flag unknown	The barque ran aground on the Marquesas Reef. She was on a voyage from Havana, Cuba to Falmouth, Cornwall, United Kingdom. She was refloated and towed in to Key West, Florida, United States.
Unnamed	United Kingdom	The fishing boat was abandoned in the Atlantic Ocean with the loss of two of her six crew. Survivors were rescued by the steamship Tuskar (United Kingdom).

== Unknown date ==
List of shipwrecks: Unknown date in July 1873
Ship	State	Description
Afton	Canada	The schooner was abandoned in the Atlantic Ocean before 22 July. She was on a voyage from Afton, Nova Scotia to Queenstown, County Cork, United Kingdom.
Alice Ball	United States	The ship was abandoned in the Atlantic Ocean (37°56′N 42°20′W). Her crew were rescued by Benmore (United Kingdom).
Alma	United Kingdom	The smack was driven ashore at Southend, Argyllshire.
Anna	United Kingdom	The ship was wrecked at Maracaibo, Venezuela. Her crew were rescued. She was on a voyage from Maracaibo to a British port.
Canadian	United Kingdom	The ship struck a sunken rock and was beached at Craster, Northumberland. Her crew survived.
Delside	United Kingdom	The ship was damaged by fire at Callao, Peru.
Easby	United Kingdom	The steamship struck a sunken rock and was holed. She was on a voyage from Cardiff, Glamorgan to Sydney, Nova Scotia, Canada. She put in to New York, where she arrived on 1 August in a waterlogged condition.
Esmeralda	Spain	The steamship was wrecked on Luzon, Spanish East Indies. All on board were rescued.
François	France	The ship was wrecked in the Maldive Islands before 11 July. Her crew survived.
Fred Thompson	United States	The ship collided with Hermite (Spain) off Barcelona, Spain and was severely damaged. Fred Thompson was on a voyage from New York to Genoa, Italy. She was towed in to Barcelona in a waterlogged condition by Hermite.
Hannah Hicks	United Kingdom	The ship was abandoned in the Atlantic Ocean. Her crew were rescued. She was on a voyage from Jamaica to Greenock, Renfrewshire.
Helsingfors	Russia	The steamship was driven ashore at Reval on or before 4 July. She was refloated with the assistance of a steamship and a fishing boat.
Jane	United Kingdom	The barque was wrecked off the Grenadines.
Kosmopollet III	Netherlands	The ship struck a reef off Padang, Netherlands East Indies. She was refloated and beached in Sveng Pissang Bay. She was taken in to Batavia, Netherlands East Indies in a severely damaged condition in early September and placed under repair.
Margaretha	Germany	The schooner was wrecked at "Cannavierras".
Meridian	United Kingdom	The smack was driven ashore near the Hurst Castle, Hampshire. She was on a voyage from Portsmouth, Hampshire to London.
Monrovia	United Kingdom	The steamship ran aground at the mouth of the Brass River. She was refloated three days later. Temporary repairs were made and she returned to England in October.
Oracle	United Kingdom	The schooner was driven ashore at Southend, Argyllshire.
Reaper	United States	The brigantine was wrecked on Scatarie Island, Nova Scotia. Her crew were rescued. She was on a voyage from Greenland to Philadelphia.
William Archer	United Kingdom	The smack was driven ashore at Southend, Argyllshire.
