= Nathaniel Page =

Nathaniel Page, may refer to:

- The Nathaniel Page House, an historic colonial house in Bedford, Massachusetts
- Nat Page, an American former track and field athlete

== See also ==
- Nathan Page (born 1971), an Australian actor
- Nathen Page (1937–2003), an American jazz guitarist
