= Nehemiah McGray =

Canadian politician

Nehemiah Doane McGray (June 29, 1838 – October 14, 1887) was a ship's captain, merchant and political figure in Nova Scotia, Canada. He represented Shelburne County in the Nova Scotia House of Assembly as a Conservative member

== Early life ==
The son of Deacon Asa Turner McGray (1807–1877) and Eliza Ann Doane (1809–1885), McGray was born 29 June 1838 in Centreville, Cape Island, Barrington, Nova Scotia. He is the grandson of Rev Asa McGray (1780–1843), the minister who established the first church of Free Will Baptists in Nova Scotia. That church was established in Cape Sable Island.

Nehemiah McGray was the third of seven children; two brothers and four sisters. His oldest brother was Martin Doane McGray (1833–1887), who joined Nehemiah to buy his father's business and became his business partner. His youngest brother was Asa Ellsworth McGray (1842–1916), "who was a highly esteemed accountant and businessman and held managerial positions with Parker-Eakin's Company, the Yarmouth Steamship Company, and the Canadian Woodworking Company." His sisters were Susan Marie "McGray" Smith (1834–1880), Almira Davis "McGray" Kenney (1847–1932), Eliza Ann [McGray] Ross (1849–1940), and Elmira McGray (1849–1850). In 1901, Eliza Ann Ross took command of the steel four-masted barquentine "Reform," making her one of the world's first female Ship Captains.

In 1861 at the age of 22, Nehemiah married Mary Jane Smith (1840–1931), the daughter of James Caldwell Smith (1813–1879) and Sarah Godfrey Kenney (1815–1868). Mary Jane Smith was born on Cape Sable Island. Together, they had six children; four sons and two daughters.

== Life ==
Nehemiah McGray's first voyage was made on a small fishing craft, the “Labrador” on which, at the age of twelve, he served as a cook. In 1854 and 1855, he sailed from Halifax in the “Electric” and the “Philosophy,” square-rigged vessels.

In May 1856 he joined the barque “T. & J.” It was on these voyages where Nehemiah established his credentials as a ship's Master. Captain James D. Coffin certified Nehemiah's service and character as part of his application for a Master's Certificate of Competency before the British Board of Trade in London, England. It runs as follows:

This is to certify that the bearer, Mr. McGray, is the native of the same place as myself, Barrington, Nova Scotia, and that I know of his having commenced going to sea in small vessels at the age of twelve years, and, with the exception of a few winters, has been continually engaged in seafaring life. During the years 1854 and 1855 he sailed from Halifax in the “Electric” and the ‘Philosophy,’ square-rigged vessels. In May 1856 he joined the barque ‘T. & J.,’ of which I was the Master, and since that date, he has continually been in that vessel or the present one, the barque ‘Clyde,’ of which one of my brothers or I have been Master. He has been second mate or mate for 18 months. It is with much pleasure I have to state that in every capacity he has given perfect satisfaction. As an officer, he possesses superior tact and judgment. For sobriety and morality his character is unimpeachable; being a total abstainer both from intoxicating drink and from profane and abusive language.

— "Sgd" J. D. Coffin. Master of barque ‘Clyde.” Glasgow, July 16, 1858, Capt Nehemiah Doane McGray

In 1859, Captain Coffin turned over the command of his ship to Captain McGray, who sailed her until 1863, when he returned home to take charge of the new barque, “Helena,” owned by Thomas Coffin and Company of Port Clyde. After sailing this barque for nearly four years, he again came home to take command of another new barque, the “Village Queen.” His brother-in-law, John J. Kenney went out as mate and J. Fernandez Coffin as the second mate. Voyages were to South America, carrying ice from Boston to Montevideo, and trans-Atlantic as well. He remained in this until 1871 when he took charge of the 556-ton barque “Vibilia.” After successfully sailing her for two years he again returned home and took command of the 1980-ton full-rigged ship “H. W. Workman.” This ship he sailed (except one voyage from New York to Liverpool and return to New York, when Capt. John J. Kenney took command) until 1876, when she was sold through foreclosure of a mortgage held by the firm of John Black, of Liverpool, England. The liquidation of the affairs of Thomas Coffin & Co., for whom he had sailed continuously for 20 years, brought his service with this firm to close.

After the liquidation, Captain McGray made but a few ocean voyages, taking charge of the barque “Aneroid,” owned by Dennis & Doane, of Yarmouth. He previously attained some financial success through eighth ownership in the barque, “Village Queen.” During much of his service as Master, his family sailed with him.

== Business and political life ==
When his father, Asa Turner McGray, died in 1877, Nehemiah came home, and, together with his older brother, Martin Doane McGray, bought out their father's business. For ten years they conducted a considerable general business under the firm name of McGray Brothers. With others, they built fishing vessels to provide employment for young men. Every civic interest was energetically promoted. Captain McGray was elected to represent Barrington Township in the Provincial Parliament from 1878 to 1882. During this period, he accorded financial assistance to the establishment of a steam ferry service between the Island and Barrington. He became interested in a large sheep farm undertaking on the Upper Clyde River. He helped finance Barrington Woolen Mill. He obtained a Federal grant for providing a telegraph cable from the Mainland, with a view to the establishment of a Maritime Signal Station at Cape Sable's light. He supported all Church efforts and was uncompromising in the war against the sale of intoxicating drinks.

== Personal life ==
October 1887, Arthur Nehemiah McGray (1862–1949), was called home due to the illness of his father. Within days of his arrival, Nehemiah and Arthur's uncle, Martin Doane McGray (the father's brother and business partner) passed away. Nehemiah succumbed on 14 October 1887 to a severe stomach ailment when he was 49 years of age.

On behalf of the executors of both estates, Arthur disposed of their considerable stock and closed up the business. His father's firm had operated as managing owners of four vessels in the bank fishing and coastwise trades. Upon his passing, his co-owners appointed Arthur N. McGray as manager of their little fleet.
