= Port Clyde =

Port Clyde may refer to:

- Port Clyde, Maine, United States
- Port Clyde, Nova Scotia, Canada

== See also ==
- Clyde Port Authority; see The Peel Group
- Firth of Clyde, in Scotland
