= Stoddart Island =

Island in Nova Scotia, Canada

Coordinates: 43°28′10.7″N 65°42′36.6″W

Stoddart Island, Nova Scotia (alternatively known as Emerald Island or 'East' by the locals) is a privately owned 224-acre (0.91 km^{2}) tract of land located off the Southern coast of that Atlantic maritimes province, proximate to the small town of Shag Harbour in Shelburne County, Nova Scotia, Canada

The island gained some measure of fame as the site of the lighthouse wherein author Evelyn Fox Richardson spent summers with her grandfather and wrote of this experience in her book, We Keep a Light. Later, its waters off Toot's Point became a favorite haunt for Franklin Delano Roosevelt on boat crossings from his vacation home in Campobello Island, New Brunswick.
