= Lydgate =

Lydgate may refer to:

- John Lydgate (1370–1451), English monk and poet
- John Mortimer Lydgate (1854–1922), American botanist
- Tertius Lydgate, a character in the novel Middlemarch by George Eliot
- Lydgate, Greater Manchester, a village in Greater Manchester, England
- Lydgate, Nova Scotia, a Canadian community in Shelburne
- Lydgate, West Yorkshire, a village in Calderdale, England
- Lydgate Junior School, in Crosspool, Sheffield, South Yorkshire, England
