= Jordan Branch, Nova Scotia =

Community in Nova Scotia, Canada

Coordinates: 43.780°N 65.262°W

Jordan Branch is a community in the Municipality of the District of Shelburne, Nova Scotia, Canada.

== See also ==
- List of communities in Nova Scotia
