= Evelyn M. Richardson =

Canadian writer (1902–1976)

- Born: 1902; Emerald Isle, Nova Scotia, Canada
- Died: 1976 (aged 73–74); Barrington, Nova Scotia, Canada
- Education: Dalhousie University
- Occupation: writer
- Spouse: Morrill Richardson (m. 1926)

Evelyn M. Richardson, born Evelyn May Fox (1902–1976) was a Canadian writer who won the Governor General's Award in non-fiction for her 1945 memoir, We Keep a Light. The annual Evelyn Richardson Memorial Literary Award is given in her honour to a Nova Scotia writer of non-fiction.

== Life ==
She was born on Emerald Isle and raised on Cape Sable Island, the daughter of Hattie (Larkin) and Arthur Douglas Fox. Her father was a teacher. She attended high school at Halifax Academy in Halifax, Nova Scotia and later studied at Dalhousie University in that city, earning a Bachelor of Arts degree. She taught at several schools before marrying Morrill Richardson in 1926. For a time they lived in Massachusetts. In 1929, they returned to Nova Scotia where Morrill Richardson had purchased the 600 acres (240 ha) Bon Portage Island near Shag Harbour, where he took over duties as the lightkeeper. There, they spent the next thirty-five years.

While raising three children and helping to run the lighthouse, she embarked on a writing career, penning several books and numerous articles, many which chronicled her experiences on the island. She wrote in winter when there were few interruptions from visitors. They left the island in 1964 when the light was mechanized. In her retirement, she lived near Barrington, Nova Scotia.

The Evelyn Richardson Memorial Elementary School in Shag Harbour was named in her memory. Bon Portage Island is now owned by Acadia University and is used by students for biological research.

She won the Ryerson Fiction Award in 1953 for Desired Haven.

== Publications ==
Many of her books are still in print.

=== Non-fiction ===
- We Keep a Light, Toronto: Ryerson, 1945
- We Bought an Island, Philadelphia: Macrae Smith, 1954
- My Other Islands, Toronto: Ryerson, 1960
- Living island, Toronto: Ryerson, 1965
- A Voyage to Australia, 1976
- B ... was for Butter and Enemy Craft, Halifax: Petheric, 1976 (posthumous)

=== Fiction ===
- Desired Haven, Toronto: Ryerson, 1953
- No Small Tempest, Toronto: Ryerson, 1957.

=== Collections ===
- Where my roots go deep: The collected writings of Evelyn M. Richardson, Halifax: Nimbus, 1996.
