= Canada Hill, Nova Scotia =

Community in Nova Scotia, Canada

Coordinates: 43.802°N 65.123°W

Canada Hill is a community in the Canadian province of Nova Scotia, located in the Municipality of the District of Shelburne.
