= Lydgate, Nova Scotia =

Community in Nova Scotia, Canada

Coordinates: 43.720°N 65.116°W

Location of Lydgate, Nova Scotia in Nova Scotia

Lydgate is a community in the Municipality of the District of Shelburne, Nova Scotia, Canada. It is on Nova Scotia Trunk 3, and about 4 km from Lockeport. It borders on to Green Harbour bay.
