= Codseeker =

Canadian fishing vessel

History
- Name: Codseeker
- Owner: Reuben B. Stoddart
- Port of registry: Barrington, Nova Scotia, Canada
- Builder: Thomas Coffin & Company; Port Clyde, Nova Scotia, Canada
- Cost: $2,000
- Launched: April 21, 1877
- Completed: April 19, 1877
- Maiden voyage: May 8, 1877
- Stricken: 1953 ("No longer exists")
- Identification: 75543 (Official Number)
- Notes: Capsized May 9, 1877. Towed in, refitted.; Sold foreign: 1886

General characteristics
- Type: Schooner
- Tonnage: 29.5 GRT
- Length: 58 ft 6 in (17.83 m)
- Beam: 18 ft 6 in (5.64 m)
- Draft: 7 ft 1 in (2.16 m)
- Decks: 1
- Sail plan: Gaff rig
- Crew: 13

Codseeker (Note: Cod-Seeker or Cod Seeker in some sources.) was a Canadian fishing schooner launched in April 1877 and capsized the following month east of Cape Sable Island, at the southwestern tip of Nova Scotia, resulting in the loss of four lives. The ship is primarily remembered for its two crew members who remained trapped inside the hull until being rescued three days later. Codseeker was later repaired and returned to service; its ultimate fate is unclear.

== Description ==
The schooner Codseeker was constructed at Port Clyde, Nova Scotia, in 1877 by Thomas Coffin & Company. At the time, the Coffins were known for their beautifully crafted ships, mostly schooners and square-rigged ships which sailed all over the world. She was a wooden vessel, constructed for the profitable, yet dangerous fishing along the coasts of Nova Scotia and Newfoundland.

The schooner was 58 feet 6 inches (17.83 m) long, with a beam that reached 18 feet 5 inches (5.61 m). Codseeker had a net gross ton of 42 and registered ton of 29.5. The vessel sailed with the standard rigging and gaff topsail. A schooner with her dimensions would have required a certain amount of ballast to combat lateral forces against the sail. However, Codseeker was not built with the customary amount of counterbalance, most likely due to the schooner's depth.

== Capsizing ==
On 9 May 1877, while on her very first fishing outing, (Note: The ship had previously sailed to Halifax for provisions.) the new schooner capsized just east of Cape Sable Island. Eastern wind had been increasing the entire day and had turned into a storm, which caused strain on the slender vessel. Once the wind increased, the schooner started rolling heavily to its leeward side, often taking its time to recover. At this time, Captain Phillip Brown ordered the mainsail down, and headed for land. According to Brown, sailing towards the Shoal of the Rock would mean a shorter and steeper run of sea, and therefore no need to reef the foresail. However, the lightness of the vessel, being empty in the hold, caused severe and unnatural rocking and she gradually careened over until Codseeker was flat on the beam ends. Half of the schooner's deck became submerged in the frigid waters of the Atlantic Ocean.

Quickly after Codseeker keeled over, Brown, as well as a cook and another young fisherman, were able to locate a fishing dory, which sat between the foremast and the mainmast of Codseeker. Once the three men dislodged the small dory, they attempted to rescue the remaining men, but had drifted out too far while bailing the excess water out of the dory. The next morning, the men in the dory made it back to land. Arriving in Barrington, newspapers initially reported that the rest of the crew had drowned.

=== Rescue efforts ===
There were a total of 13 men on Codseeker, and after those in the dory reached shore and reported the capsizing, the American schooner Matchless, under the command of Captain Job Crowell, set out on May 10 to search for survivors, sailing through heavy seas. It found the Codseeker and was able to rescue four men clinging to the wreckage. However, unknown to those survivors and their rescuers, two men were still trapped alive inside Codseeker. On May 12, the American schooner Ohio was passing by the wreckage when members of its crew, dispatched to identify the capsized vessel, realized that survivors were still onboard and rescued crewmen James Smith and Samuel Atwood by chopping into the hull with an axe. One account states the men had been trapped in the ship for 89 hours.

Of the 13 men of the Codseeker, nine survived the capsizing: three via the dory, four rescued by the Matchless, and two rescued by the Ohio. Of the four men who did not survive, two died below deck when the ship capsized, and one surnamed Nickerson was washed away and drowned while awaiting rescue by the Matchless. Codseeker was later towed to Green Cove in Yarmouth County by the two schooners Condor and Dove. Upon arrival, three bodies were found in the ship.

=== Crew roster ===
Names of the crew of the Codseeker were published in the Boston Evening Transcript of 12 May 1877:

- Phillip M. Brown (master)
- Samuel Atwood
- Robert Bass
- William Goodman
- Ziba Hunt Jr.
- Norman Newell
- J. Nickerson
- James Smith
- Jesse Smith
- John Smith
- John E. Smith
- two unnamed boys

Brown, Atwood, and James Smith are known to have survived, while Nickerson is known to have perished. There are inconsistencies between the Transcript list and other sources, including Nickerson's given name and mention of survivors named Will Kenney and Tanny Knowles.

== Aftermath ==
By July, just two month after her capsizing, Codseeker was repaired and back at sea. The captain of the Ohio, Edwin O. Dorr, (Note: Dorr died in October 1933, reportedly the day before his 85th birthday.) was presented with a gold watch by the Canadian government (Note: A letter accompanying the watch, quoted in Dorr's obituary, was signed by Albert James Smith, Minister of Marine and Fisheries.) in recognition of his life-saving efforts. (Note: One source says the watch was presented to the Captain Crowell of the Matchless, but this is contradicted by several sources discussing Captain Dorr of the Ohio.)

How long the Codseeker remained in service is unclear, as mentions of the ship other than its capsizing, rescuing of trapped crew members, and being towed into port, are absent from contemporary newspaper reports. One later account states the ship subsequently survived "the great Newfoundland gale of 1885." Canadian records indicate it was registered as late as 1903. The ship continued on the registry books until 1953, when her registration showed a closure reason of "no longer exists". A 1937 newspaper article stated the Codseeker was refitted then "lost will all hands on its seconds voyage", but this lacks corroboration.

A relatively complete retelling of the event appeared in The Sun of New York City in June 1884. Additional detail, especially a first-person account by survivor James Smith, appears to date from the article "The Wreck of the Cod-Seeker", attributed to Colin McKay and published in many American newspapers during 1914. A variant of that account was published as late as 1945 in England.

== Sources ==
- Easton, Alan (1992). Terror On The Coast: The Wreck of the Codseeker. Nimbus Publishing Limited. ISBN 978-1551090252.
- Murphy, William M. (1976). "The Wreck of the Codseeker". Great Canadian Adventures. The Reader's Digest Association (Canada). pp. 261–269. SBN 888500513 – via archive.org.
