= Indian Fields, Nova Scotia =

Community in Nova Scotia, Canada

Coordinates: 44.0230°N 65.4556°W

Indian Fields, Nova Scotia is an unincorporated community and provincial park reserve in the Municipality of the District of Shelburne, Nova Scotia, Canada, on Route 203 at an elevation of about 70m. There is an area of meadows. The few households that make up the community are not serviced by Nova Scotia Power. There is an abandoned airfield near the junction of Indian Fields Road and Route 203.

The park reserve—an area of Crown land that has been set aside for potential development and management as a provincial park—has an area of 1,619 hectares, some of which is in Yarmouth County. It adjoins the Tobeatic Wilderness Area and provides habitat for the endangered mainland moose. It borders several lakes with fresh-water beaches, and sections of the Roseway and Clyde rivers.

== See also ==
- Indian old field
