= Eliza Ann Ross =

Eliza Ann Ross, née McGray (1849–1940), is a Canadian woman best known for commanding the steel four-mast barquentine Reform.

== Early life ==
The daughter of Deacon Asa Turner McGray (1807–1877) and Eliza Ann Doane (1809–1885), Eliza Ann Ross was born 15 August 1849 in Centreville, Cape Sable Island, Barrington, Nova Scotia. She is the granddaughter of Rev. Asa McGray (1780–1843), the minister who established the first church of Free Will Baptists in Nova Scotia.

Eliza Ann was the sixth of seven children; three brothers and three sisters. Her two oldest brothers were Martin Doane McGray (1833–1887) and Nehemiah Doane McGray (1838–1887). They formed a Barrington company called "McGray Brothers." Her third brother was Asa Ellsworth McGray (1842–1916). Asa Ellsworth was a British government official in the Calcutta India embassy. He subsequently became a businessman in Yarmouth, Nova Scotia.

Her older sisters were Susan Marie "McGray" Smith (1834–1880) and Almira Davis "McGray" Kenney (1847–1932). Her twin sister Ermina or Elmira McGray (1849–1850) died in infancy.

In 1874 at the age of 24, Eliza Ann married Captain David Larkin Ross (1846–1901), the son of Edmund Ross (1807–1899) and Zeruiah Larkin (1811–1898). David Ross was born in Barrington, Nova Scotia. The couple bore no children.

Tragedy struck Eliza Ann's sister in January 1888. Almira Davis "McGray" Kenney's husband was lost at sea. Captain John Jenkins Kenney (1843-1888) was the master on the schooner Cape Sable. Somewhere between Halifax to Puerto Rico, the schooner and crew were lost. Almira's oldest daughter, Bessie Bernice Kenney (1867–1888), died a few days later. As a consequence of these tragedies, Eliza Ann and her husband Captain David Ross raised Almira's fourth son, John Jenkins Kenney (1882–1963).

== Personal life ==
Eliza Ann accompanied her husband, Captain David Ross, on many ocean voyages in square-riggers. They sailed around Cape Horn several times and crisscrossed the Atlantic carrying general cargo to British, Scottish, and northern European ports, sailing mainly from New York and Philadelphia.

She was with her husband aboard the brig Madeline Lovitt in 1899, en route to Falmouth with a load of grain, when their ship was rammed and badly damaged while lying in wait for a favorable wind.

On their last voyage Captain Ross who was then fifty-three years old, accompanied by Eliza Ann, was in command of the steel four-masted barquentine Reform, which had been bought by William Lovitt of Yarmouth, Nova Scotia in 1899.

Reform cleared the port of Brunswick, Georgia, on February 2, 1901, bound for Buenos Aires. She had a new crew of Portuguese sailors, none of whom could speak or understand English, except Alexander Spears, the first mate.

Within a fortnight, the ship ran into a violent winter storm. On the night of February the eleventh, a heavy sea broke over the barquentine and flooded the deck, sweeping Captain Ross overboard to a watery grave.

This was a traumatic experience for Eliza Ann but, having learned navigation from her husband, she assumed command of the ship. Besides having to cope with her loss and the responsibility of taking complete charge of the barquentine, she had to depend on her first mate to interpret her orders to the crew. For fear that they might mutiny, she made sure the crew was not aware that the captain was gone. For the next fifty days, Eliza Ann was the ship's master. Reform cleared Argentina, and Eliza Ann successfully delivered Reform's cargo.

Eliza Ann had an additional responsibility. Her sister's son, John Jenkins Kenney, may have accompanied her on this journey. He would have been about 17 years old at the time.

The first mate that assisted Eliza Ann was subsequently promoted. Captain Alex Spears became Reform's new master.

== Return and retirement ==
Eliza Ann Ross boarded the first steamer sailing to New York. She lived in New York for a while before returning to Nova Scotia. After returning to Nova Scotia, she took up residence at the "Old Ladies Home" in Yarmouth. She lived near her brother, Asa Ellsworth McGray, and his family.

Although Eliza Ann did not leave any descendants, she did raise her sister's son, John Jenkins Kenney, Jr. He moved to the United States in April 1902 and became a citizen in June 1917. He was unmarried. He frequently visited his aunt, and he looked after her interests for the rest of her life.

Eliza Ann died on January 17, 1940, at the age of 91 years. She was buried near her grandparents, parents, sisters, and brothers in the McGray family plot in Centreville, Cape Sable Island, Shelburne, Nova Scotia.

== Reform ==
Reform was built in Stavanger, Norway, in 1894, and was christened Sachsen. She was a four-masted barkentine built of steel at 191.7 feet long and 30.4 feet wide. Her gross tonnage was 593.24, with under deck tonnage at 540.01, poop 4.29, roundhouse 39.30, hatchway 9.64, and deductions 48.24, for a net 545 registered tonnage. The 48.24-ton deductions accounted for 16.70 tons for crew and officers. An additional 31.54 tons accounted for the master's cabin, chart room, boatswain's stores, and sail room aft.

On 16 March 1896, Sachsen was wrecked on Burial Island off County Down, Ireland. She was purchased and repaired by an English shipowner. In 1898 Norske Veritas listed Sachsen's owner as J. J. Marks, Liverpool. At that time, Sachsen's name was changed to Reform.

From 1899 to 1906, Reform was owned by William Leslie Lovett of Yarmouth, Nova Scotia. From 1903 to 1906, Reform's ownership was through The Reform Shipping Company, Limited. Under Yarmouth owners, she was chiefly engaged in the lumber trade with South America.

On 15 November 1906, the Reform was in ballast, sailing from Rio Janeiro to Turk's Island, where she was to load a cargo of salt for Boston. At about 5 o'clock in the morning, Reform, while under full sail, struck a sunken reef about a mile from Barbuda and "went so hard and fast that it was decided impossible to take her off." While Reform was a total loss, Captain Spears and the crew reached the shore safely. She was insured for $10,000 by the Boston Insurance Company.

Reform is not to be confused by a similarly named ship also associated with southern Nova Scotia. Brig Reform from Barbados went ashore at Brier Island in nearby Digby County on 25 November 1837. There, she was wrecked with the crew saved.
