= Christopher Page House =

Historic house in Massachusetts, United States

- U.S. National Register of Historic Places
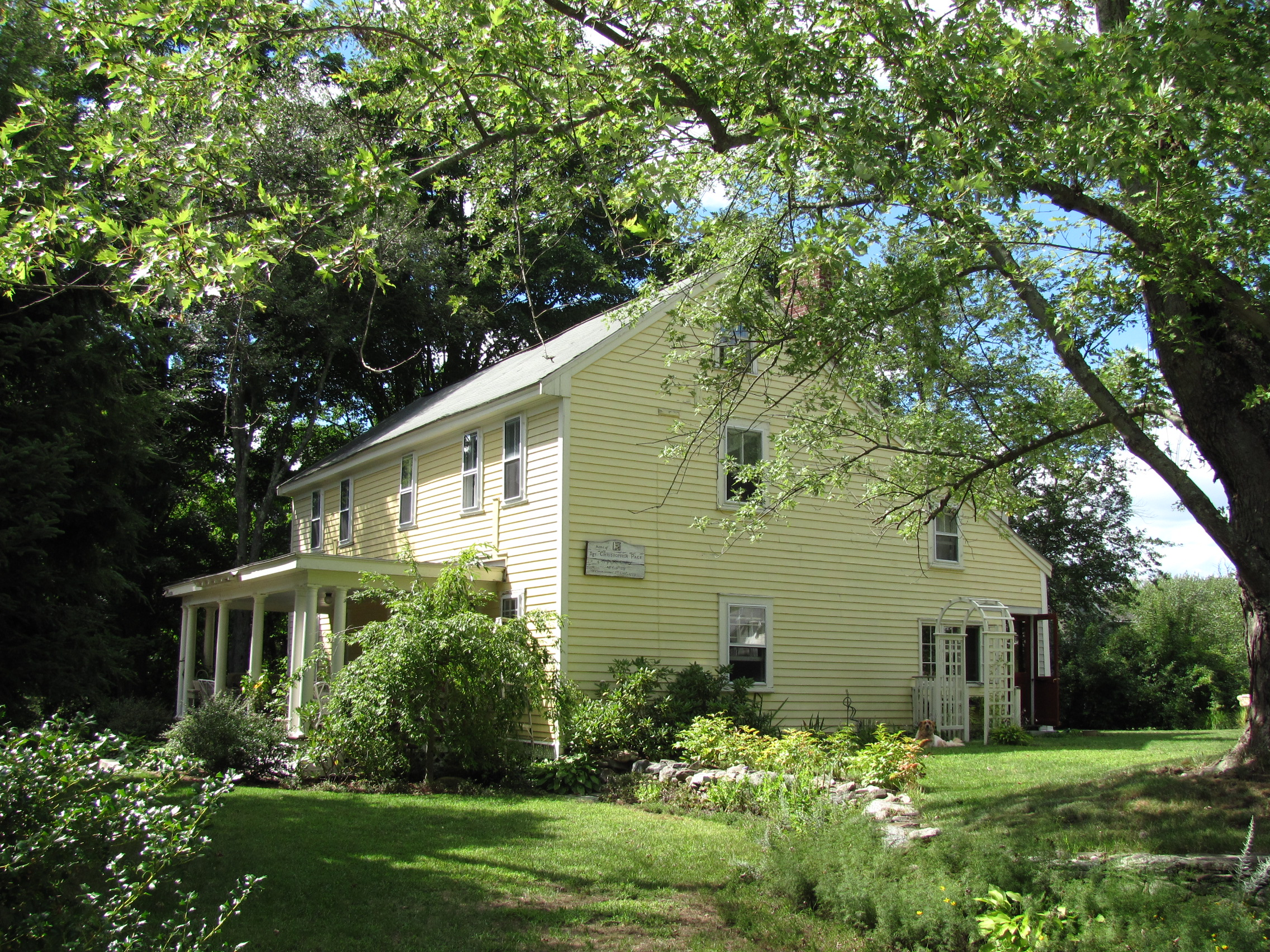
- Christopher Page House

- Location within Massachusetts Location within the United States
- Location: 2 Myers Lane, Bedford, Massachusetts
- Coordinates: 42°29′47.0″N 71°15′31.7″W
- Built: 1730
- Architectural style: Colonial
- MPS: First Period Buildings of Eastern Massachusetts TR
- NRHP reference No.: 90000163
- Added to NRHP: March 9, 1990

The Christopher Page House is a historic First Period house in Bedford, Massachusetts. The 2 1/2 story timber-frame house was built c. 1730, exhibiting construction techniques that are transitional between First Period and Georgian practice. The main block is five bays wide with a large central chimney, and an added leanto section. A leanto dormer was added in the late 19th century, as was the Colonial Revival front porch. The interior and exterior both received stylistic treatment during the Federal period.

The house was listed on the National Register of Historic Places in 1990.

Christopher Page (1707-1786) and his family are intertwined with the history of Bedford and its battle flag, the oldest known flag in the United States.

The Pages were among the earliest European families the area. In 1688, English-born Nathaniel Page bought 250 acres from a farmer in what was then Billerica. In 1720, the Pages and other families began negotiations with the Massachusetts Great and General Court to split off from Billerica and Concord to form a new town. Incorporation was granted and the town was chartered in September 1729.

== See also ==
- National Register of Historic Places listings in Middlesex County, Massachusetts
