= Sable River West, Nova Scotia =

Community in Nova Scotia, Canada

Coordinates: 43°48′50.7″N 65°2′36.1″W

Sable River West is a community in the Shelburne County, Nova Scotia, Canada.
