= East Sable River, Nova Scotia =

Community in Nova Scotia, Canada

Coordinates: 43.783455°N 65.002303°W

East Sable River is a community in the Canadian province of Nova Scotia, located in Shelburne County. It is on the east bank of the Sable River estuary.
