= Louis Head, Nova Scotia =

Community in Nova Scotia, Canada

Coordinates: 43°45′0″N 65°1′1″W

Louis Head in Nova Scotia

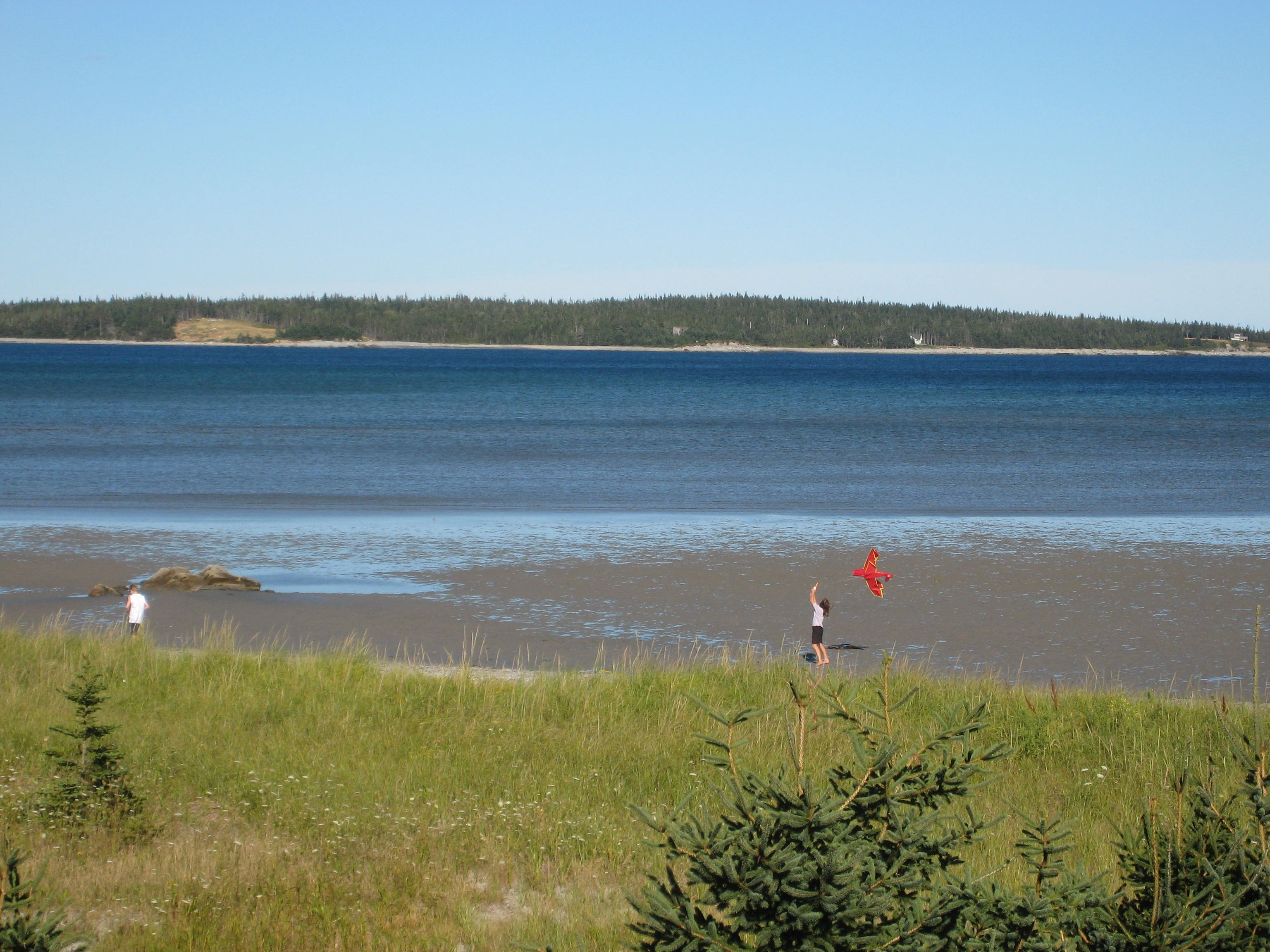

Louis Head is a community in the Municipal District of Shelburne in the Canadian province of Nova Scotia on the Lighthouse Route.
