= Port L'Hebert, Nova Scotia =

Community in Nova Scotia, Canada

Coordinates: 43°48′5.69″N 64°55′59.95″W

Port L'Hebert in Nova Scotia

Port L'Hebert is a community of the Municipality of the District of Shelburne in the Canadian province of Nova Scotia.

== History ==
Originally called "Apsiboogwechk" by the Mi'kmaq, this area was later named "Port a l'Ours" or "Port aux Ours" by the French for the apparent abundance of bears in the area at the time. The English translation "Port of Bears" gradually changed to Port L'Hebert when it was thought Pierre Dugua, Sieur de Mons had named it for his apothecary, Louis Hébert.

The name is pronounced in three different fashions by locals and other Nova Scotians. Some pronounce it "Port Le HERbert", while others pronounce it "Port Le HEbert" or "Port Le BEAR". All can be considered correct.
