= Ingomar, Nova Scotia =

Ingomar
- Community
- Location of Ingomar, Nova Scotia
- Coordinates: 43.564722°N 65.358333°W
- Country: Canada
- Province: Nova Scotia
- County: Shelburne
- Municipal district: Shelburne
- Time zone: UTC-4 (AST)
  - Summer (DST): UTC-3 (ADT)
- Postal code(s): B0T 1H0
- Area code: 902
- Access Routes: Shore Road

Ingomar is a community in the Canadian province of Nova Scotia, located in the Shelburne municipal district of Shelburne County.

== See also ==
- List of communities in Nova Scotia
