= Upper Port La Tour, Nova Scotia =

Upper Port La Tour
- Community
- Location of Upper Port La Tour, Nova Scotia
- Coordinates: 43.512222°N 65.47°W
- Country: Canada
- Province: Nova Scotia
- County: Shelburne
- Municipal district: Barrington
- Time zone: UTC-4 (AST)
  - Summer (DST): UTC-3 (ADT)
- Postal code(s): B0W 1E0
- Area code: 902
- Access Routes: Route 309

Upper Port La Tour is a community in the Canadian province of Nova Scotia, located in the Municipality of the District of Barrington of Shelburne County.

== See also ==
- List of communities in Nova Scotia
