= Jordan Bay, Nova Scotia =

Community in Nova Scotia, Canada

Coordinates: 43°42′9″N 65°14′16″W

Jordan Bay in Nova Scotia

Jordan Bay is a community in the Canadian province of Nova Scotia, located in the Municipality of the District of Shelburne.
