= North West Harbour, Nova Scotia =

North West Harbour
- Community
- Location of North West Harbour, Nova Scotia
- Coordinates: 43.563056°N 65.414167°W
- Country: Canada
- Province: Nova Scotia
- County: Shelburne
- Municipal district: Shelburne
- Time zone: UTC-4 (AST)
  - Summer (DST): UTC-3 (ADT)
- Area code: 902
- Access Routes: Shore Road

North West Harbour is a community in the Canadian province of Nova Scotia, located in the Shelburne municipal district of Shelburne County.

== See also ==
- List of communities in Nova Scotia
