= Lower Jordan Bay, Nova Scotia =

Community in Nova Scotia, Canada

Coordinates: 43.6830°N 65.2451°W

Lower Jordan Bay, Nova Scotia is a community in the Shelburne County, Nova Scotia, Canada.
