= Sandy Point, Nova Scotia =

Sandy Point
- Community
- Location of Sandy Point, Nova Scotia
- Coordinates: 43.707222°N 65.3225°W
- Country: Canada
- Province: Nova Scotia
- County: Shelburne
- Municipal district: Shelburne

Area
  - Total: 2.44 km^{2} (0.94 sq mi)

Population (2021)
  - Total: 369
  - Density: 151/km^{2} (390/sq mi)
- Time zone: UTC-4 (AST)
  - Summer (DST): UTC-3 (ADT)
- Area code: 902
- Access Routes: Sandy Point Road

Sandy Point is a community in the Canadian province of Nova Scotia, located in the Shelburne municipal district of Shelburne County. It is within the Atlantic Standard Time Zone (GMT-4).

== Demographics ==
In the 2021 Census of Population conducted by Statistics Canada, Sandy Point had a population of 369 living in 159 of its 169 total private dwellings, a change of 6.3% from its 2016 population of 347. With a land area of 2.44 km^{2} (0.94 sq mi), it had a population density of 151.2/km^{2} (391.7/sq mi) in 2021.

== See also ==
- List of communities in Nova Scotia
