= Jordan Ferry, Nova Scotia =

Canadian community

Coordinates: 43°44′37″N 65°14′6″W

Jordan Ferry in Nova Scotia

Jordan Ferry is a community in the Canadian province of Nova Scotia, located in the Municipality of the District of Shelburne.
