= Sable River Station, Nova Scotia =

Railway station in Nova Scotia, Canada

Coordinates: 43.831262°N 65.056871°W

Sable River Station is a railway point in Shelburne County, Nova Scotia, Canada.
