= Granite Village, Nova Scotia =

Community in Nova Scotia, Canada

Coordinates: 43°52′25.12″N 64°58′5.4″W

Granite Village in Nova Scotia

Granite Village is a community of the Municipality of the District of Shelburne in the Canadian province of Nova Scotia.
