= Asa McGray =

Rev. Asa McGray (1780–1843) is best known as the minister who established the first church of Free Will Baptists in Nova Scotia, Canada.

== Early life ==
The son of Capt. William McGray (1746–1810) and Susannah Turner (1741–1801), Asa McGray was born 18 September 1780 in the Town of North Yarmouth, Cumberland County, Maine. He is the seventh of eight children with three brothers and four sisters. His older brother, Rev. William McGray (1777–1861) was a Methodist minister in Unity, Waldo County, Maine, United States.

On 29 March 1801, at the age of 20, Asa McGray married Susannah Stoddard (1783–1864), the daughter of William Stoddard (1752–1825) and Ruth Needham (1756 – ), and settled in Durham, Maine. Susannah's gravestone and obituary note that she was born in Charlestown, Middlesex County, Massachusetts (now Boston, Suffolk County, Massachusetts). Indirect evidence suggests she may not have been born in Charlestown but in Charlton, Massachusetts, where her father and mother lived and married.

Asa McGray, his siblings, and children are direct descendants of Elder William Brewster and Mary Brewster, who were Mayflower passengers.

"John Turner and Mary Brewster his wife, were the great-great-grandparents of Susanna Turner who married William McGray, the parents of Rev. Asa McGray, of Cape Island, N.S."

== Ministerial life ==
1805: Asa McGray converted to Methodism in Durham, Maine and was baptized by immersion.

1810: Asa McGray and his family lived in Ellsworth, Hancock County, Maine. About that time, he joined the Methodist Society and received from them a license to preach.

1813: Rev. Asa McGray began preaching.

1814: Rev. Asa McGray joined the Free Will Baptists. He was ordained by the Fairfax Baptist Church in Fairfax, Maine (subsequently re-named Albion, Maine).

1816: Rev. Asa McGray and his family arrived in Windsor, Nova Scotia, Canada. They settled in Cornwallis, where he preached and worked at his trade as a wheelwright. “Whenever the opportunity presented itself, he preached, becoming the first Free Will Baptist preacher in Nova Scotia."

1821: Rev. Asa McGray and his family settled in Cape Sable Island, Shelburne County, Nova Scotia. There, he established a church of 19 members, which was the first church of Free Will Baptists in Nova Scotia.

1826: Rev. Asa McGray helped organize the Free Will Baptist Church in Greene, Maine. In addition, he helped form other churches in Nova Scotia's Shelburne, Yarmouth, Kings, and Queens counties. He continued preaching at Cape Sable Island until his death in 1843.

Cape Sable Island was Asa McGray's parish. "He preached without salary, working his land and taking freewill offerings for his support." He was a promoter for the public good, including developing agriculture, expanding the local economy, and help build a bridge to cross an island creek. In addition, in 1831 he was a leader of Cape Sable Island's branch of the Total Abstinence Society, which was a provincial temperance movement. At the time, that society numbered 71 male and 96 female members.

Rev. McGray died 30 December 1843. While the Shelburne County Genealogical Society and Free Will Baptist Church records give Asa's death date as 30 December, his gravestone indicates 28 December 1843. He is buried behind to his church in Centreville, Cape Sable Island. His funeral was conducted by Rev. Edward Reynolds, preaching from 2 Samuel, "Know ye not that there is a prince and a great man fallen this day in Israel."

A drawing of Rev. McGray was made in black crayon in the 1830s by a fellow minister from Maine. About 1876, the artist Jacob Blauvelt of Tusket painted an oil on canvas portrait from the old crayon drawing. This is thought to be the only surviving portrait of Rev. McGray. That portrait is held in the Baptist Section, Acadia's Digital Collection, Acadia University in Wolfville, Kings, Nova Scotia, Canada.

== Personal life ==
Rev. McGray and his wife Susannah were parents to eight children. There were five sons and three daughters. Five were born in Maine and three were born in Canada. In order of birth, their children were:

Born in Maine, USA:

- William J. McGray (1802–1865) married Letitia Roberts (1803–1887) and raised three sons,
- Sarah Carpenter McGray (1803–1850) married John Harvey Doane (1799–1871) and raised six children,
- Ruth Carpenter McGray (1805–1868) married Joseph Atwood Smith (1802–1872) and raised eight children
- Asa Turner McGray (1807–1877) married Eliza Ann Doane (1809–1885) and raised seven children,
- John Colby McGray (1810–1887) married Elizabeth Smith (1812–1904) and raised six children,

Born in Nova Scotia, Canada:

- Rebecca Smith McGray (1819–1871) married Joseph Neil McComiskey (1821–1871) and raised nine children,
- Jethro Covel George Washington McGray (13 Sep 1822–1839), unmarried.
- Albert Swim Wellington McGray (13 Sep 1822–1890) married first Sarah Elizabeth Nickerson (1824–1877) and married second Sarah R. Crowell (1841–1927).

Siblings Sarah Carpenter McGray and Asa Turner McGray, married siblings John Harvey Doane and Eliza Ann Doane. John and Eliza Doane are direct descendants of Deacon John Doane.

Several descendants of Rev. Asa McGray were also named Asa McGray, including his son Asa Turner McGray and four grandsons: Asa McGray (1828–1812), Asa McGray Doane (1833–1835, Asa McGray Doane (1835–1906), and Asa Ellsworth McGray (1842–1916).

Rev. McGray and Susannah's family expanded with approximately 45 grandchildren, which included Nehemiah Doane McGray and Eliza Ann Ross. Most their grandchildren were born and raised in Nova Scotia, many near Cape Sable Island.
