= West Green Harbour, Nova Scotia =

Community in Nova Scotia, Canada

Coordinates: 43°43′5″N 65°10′15″W

West Green Harbour in Nova Scotia

West Green Harbour is a community of the Municipality of the District of Shelburne in the Canadian province of Nova Scotia.
