= Rockland, Nova Scotia =

Community in Nova Scotia, Canada

Coordinates: 43°44′1″N 65°4′35″W

Rockland in Nova Scotia

Rockland is a community in the Canadian province of Nova Scotia, located in the Municipality of the District of Shelburne.
