= East Side of Ragged Island, Nova Scotia =

Community in Nova Scotia, Canada

Coordinates: 43°42′15″N 65°4′26″W

East Side of Ragged Island in Nova Scotia

East Side of Ragged Island is a community of the Municipality of the District of Shelburne in the Canadian province of Nova Scotia.
