= Allendale, Nova Scotia =

Community in Nova Scotia, Canada

Coordinates: 43°45′3″N 65°5′33″W

Allendale in Nova Scotia

Allendale is a community in the Canadian province of Nova Scotia, located in the Municipality of the District of Shelburne. It was named after James Allen.
