= Clyde River, Nova Scotia =

Community in Nova Scotia, Canada

Clyde River
- Quinns Road, Upper and Lower Clyde, Port Clyde, Oak Lane, Pulp Mill Road and many other small places.
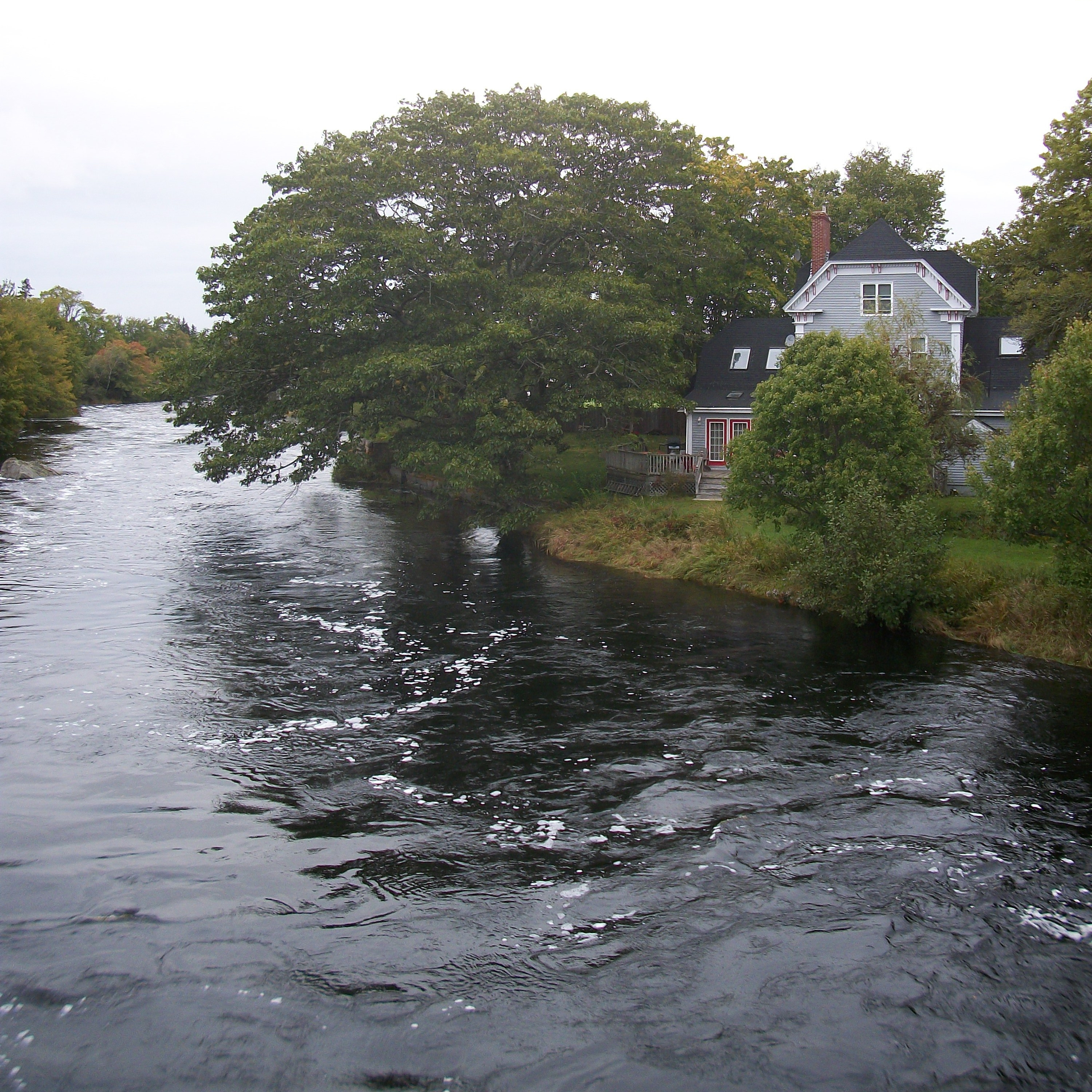
- Clyde River shares its name with the river which runs through it

- Location of Clyde River, Nova Scotia
- Coordinates: 43.631944°N 65.480556°W
- Country: Canada
- Province: Nova Scotia
- County: Shelburne
- Municipal district: Shelburne

Population (2006)
  - Total: 1,836
  - Change (2001-06): ▼2.7%
- Time zone: UTC-4 (AST)
  - Summer (DST): UTC-3 (ADT)
- Postal code(s): B0W 1R0
- Area code: 902
- Access Routes Hwy 103: Route 309

Clyde River is a community in the Canadian province of Nova Scotia, located in the Shelburne municipal district of Shelburne County. It borrows its name from the Clyde River which flows through the community, which was in turn adopted from the famous Scottish river. The area was settled by New England Planters about 1667 and later by Loyalists after 1783. Lumbering and farming were the initial industries. In 1847 there were 15 Mi'kmaq families living in the Clyde River area.

== See also ==
- List of communities in Nova Scotia
- Lower Clyde River, a similarly-named community upstream
