= Nathaniel Page House =

Historic house in Massachusetts, United States

- U.S. National Register of Historic Places
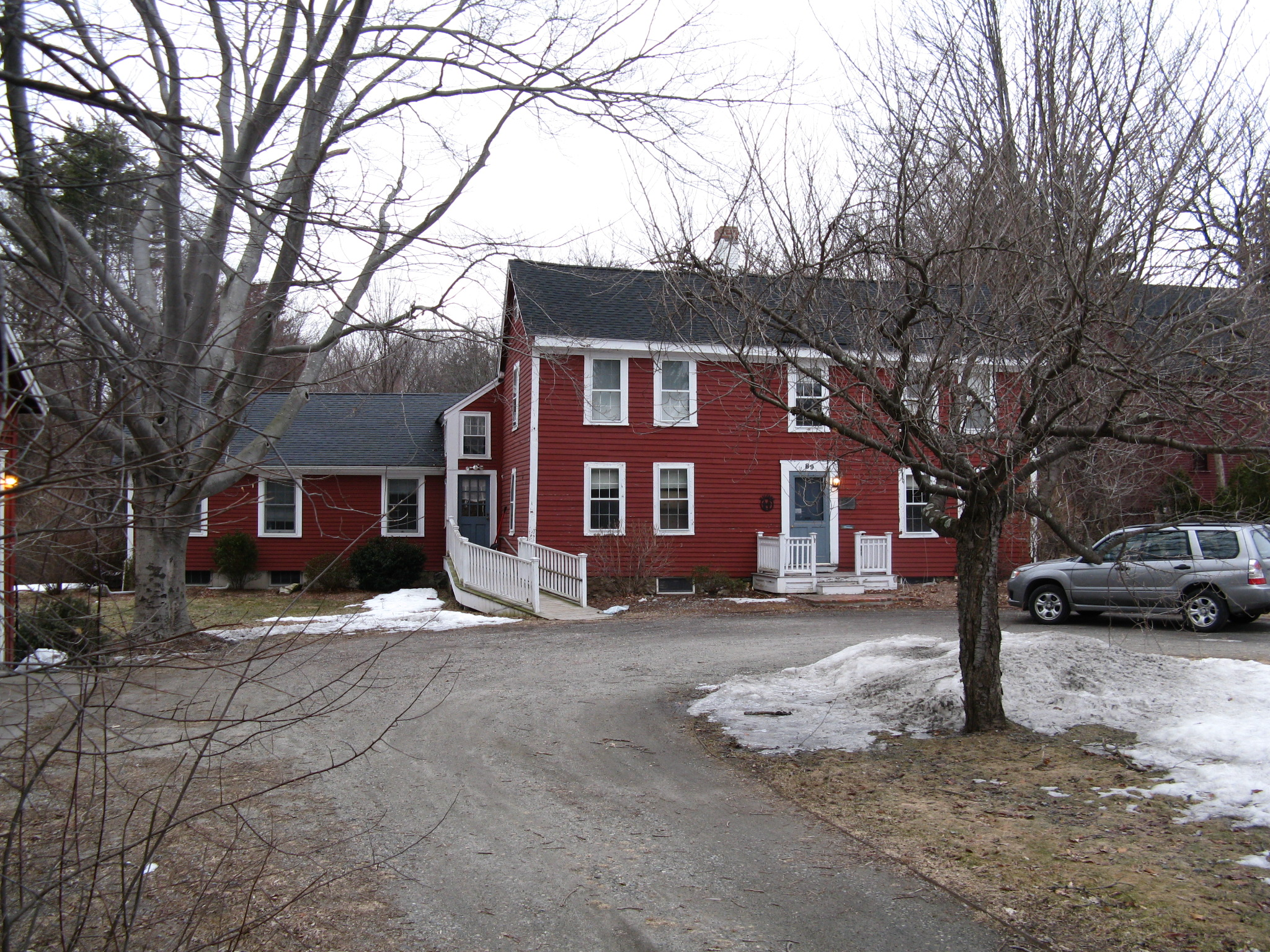
- Nathaniel Page House

- Location within Massachusetts Location within the United States
- Location: 89 Page Road, Bedford, Massachusetts
- Coordinates: 42°29′37″N 71°15′48″W
- Built: After 1715
- Architectural style: Colonial
- NRHP reference No.: 78000433
- Added to NRHP: March 29, 1978

The Nathaniel Page House is a historic colonial First Period house in Bedford, Massachusetts. It was originally thought to date from 1687, but an investigation conducted by the "This Old House" television program placed the actual date of construction at about 1720. The house is a 2 1/2-story wood-frame structure, five bays wide, with a side-gable roof, clapboard siding, and a central chimney. A single-story ell extends to the left side of the main block.

The house was listed on the National Register of Historic Places in 1978.

== See also ==
- List of the oldest buildings in Massachusetts
- National Register of Historic Places listings in Middlesex County, Massachusetts
