= East Jordan, Nova Scotia =

Community in Nova Scotia, Canada

Coordinates: 43°46′0″N 65°12′57″W

East Jordan in Nova Scotia

East Jordan, Nova Scotia is a community of the Municipality of the District of Shelburne in the Canadian province of Nova Scotia on Nova Scotia Trunk 3.
