= Little Harbour, Shelburne, Nova Scotia =

Community in Nova Scotia, Canada

Coordinates: 43°43′18″N 65°2′4″W

Linden in Nova Scotia

Little Harbour is a community of the Municipality of the District of Shelburne in the Canadian province of Nova Scotia.
