= East Green Harbour, Nova Scotia =

Community in Nova Scotia, Canada

Coordinates: 43°43′44″N 65°7′52″W

East Green Harbour in Nova Scotia

East Green Harbour is a community of the Municipality of the District of Shelburne in the Canadian province of Nova Scotia.
