= Upper Clyde River, Nova Scotia =

Community in Canada

Coordinates: 43°53′48.85″N 65°27′27.26″W

Upper Clyde River in Nova Scotia

Upper Clyde River is a community of the Municipality of the District of Shelburne in the Canadian province of Nova Scotia.
