= Welshtown, Nova Scotia =

Community in Nova Scotia, Canada

Coordinates: 43°50′8.75″N 65°23′12.65″W

Welshtown in Nova Scotia

Welshtown previously known as New Cambria, is a community of the Municipality of the District of Shelburne in the Canadian province of Nova Scotia.
