= Little Port l'Hébert, Nova Scotia =

Community in Nova Scotia, Canada

Coordinates: 43°45′59.87″N 64°57′9.16″W

Little Port l'Hébert in Nova Scotia

Little Port l'Hébert is a community of the Municipality of the District of Shelburne in the Canadian province of Nova Scotia.
