= Middle Ohio, Nova Scotia =

Community in Nova Scotia, Canada

Coordinates: 43°55′43″N 65°24′30″W

Middle Ohio in Nova Scotia

Middle Ohio is a community of the Municipality of the District of Shelburne in the Canadian province of Nova Scotia.
