= Upper Ohio, Nova Scotia =

Community in Nova Scotia, Canada

Coordinates: 43°58′55″N 65°26′10″W

Upper Ohio in Nova Scotia

Upper Ohio is a community of the Municipality of the District of Shelburne in the Canadian province of Nova Scotia. Upper Ohio is one community in Nova Scotia that is still not on the power grid.
