= Lower Ohio, Nova Scotia =

Community in Nova Scotia, Canada

Lower Ohio
- Community
- Location within Nova Scotia Lower Ohio (Canada)
- Coordinates: 43°50′16.78″N 65°21′54.17″W
- Country: Canada
- Province: Nova Scotia
- Municipality: Municipality of the District of Shelburne
- Time zone: UTC−4 (AST)
  - Summer (DST): UTC−3 (ADT)

Lower Ohio in Nova Scotia

Lower Ohio is a community of the Municipality of the District of Shelburne in the Canadian province of Nova Scotia.
