= Shag Harbour, Nova Scotia =

Shag Harbour
- Community
- Location of Shag Harbour, Nova Scotia
- Coordinates: 43.494167°N 65.718056°W
- Country: Canada
- Province: Nova Scotia
- County: Shelburne
- Municipal district: Barrington
- Time zone: UTC-4 (AST)
  - Summer (DST): UTC-3 (ADT)
- Postal code(s): B0W 3B0
- Area code: 902
- Access Routes: Trunk 3

Shag Harbour is a small fishing community on the South Shore of Nova Scotia. It is one of several small villages in the Municipality of the District of Barrington, Shelburne County. It has a population of roughly 400-450. Industry in the town centres on lobster fishing, which takes place from November to May.

Shag Harbour is home to the Shag Harbour UFO Museum and Chapel Hill Museum. The Chapel Hill Museum (c. 1856) is designated under the provincial Heritage Property Act. The village is served by the Shag Harbour - Bear Point Volunteer Fire Department. Children of the village attend Evelyn Richardson Memorial Elementary School, named for a local author. Bon Portage Island, or Outer Island, was the setting for Richardson's award-winning non-fiction.

== UFO incident ==
Shag Harbour is famous for a 1967 UFO sighting. On October 4, 1967, multiple people saw a chain of lights in the sky, which seemed to angle down and impact into the ocean near Shag Harbour. Thinking that an aircraft might have crashed, witnesses called the Royal Canadian Mounted Police. RCMP officers at the scene and other witnesses saw a light bobbing on the surface, which started drifting out to sea and disappeared.

A rescue effort was quickly assembled. A large swath of thick yellow foam was witnessed in the water by fishermen and other rescuers who aided in the search for possible survivors. They were soon joined by a Coast Guard cutter. Government agencies quickly ruled out a plane crash when none were reported missing, and other possibilities were ruled out as well, such as flares. The unknown object was then officially classified as a "UFO". The Royal Canadian Navy soon launched an underwater search for possible debris, but nothing was found and the object was never identified.

Several TV documentaries and a book have been created about the incident.

== See also ==
- List of communities in Nova Scotia
