= Centreville, Shelburne, Nova Scotia =

Centreville
- Community
- Location of Centreville, Nova Scotia
- Coordinates: 43.475556°N 65.602222°W
- Country: Canada
- Province: Nova Scotia
- County: Shelburne
- Municipal district: Barrington
- Time zone: UTC-4 (AST)
  - Summer (DST): UTC-3 (ADT)
- Area code: 902
- Access Routes: Route 330

Centreville is a small community on Cape Sable Island in the Canadian province of Nova Scotia, located in the Municipality of the District of Barrington of Shelburne County.

Centreville was, in the early 1820s, the site of the first Free Will Baptist church in Nova Scotia, founded by Rev. Asa McGray.

The Archelaus Smith Museum (1896) in Centreville is on the Canadian Register of Historic Places.

== See also ==
- List of communities in Nova Scotia
- Archelaus Smith
