= Sable River, Nova Scotia =

Community in Nova Scotia, Canada

Coordinates: 43°50′27.48″N 65°3′50.85″W

Sable River in Nova Scotia

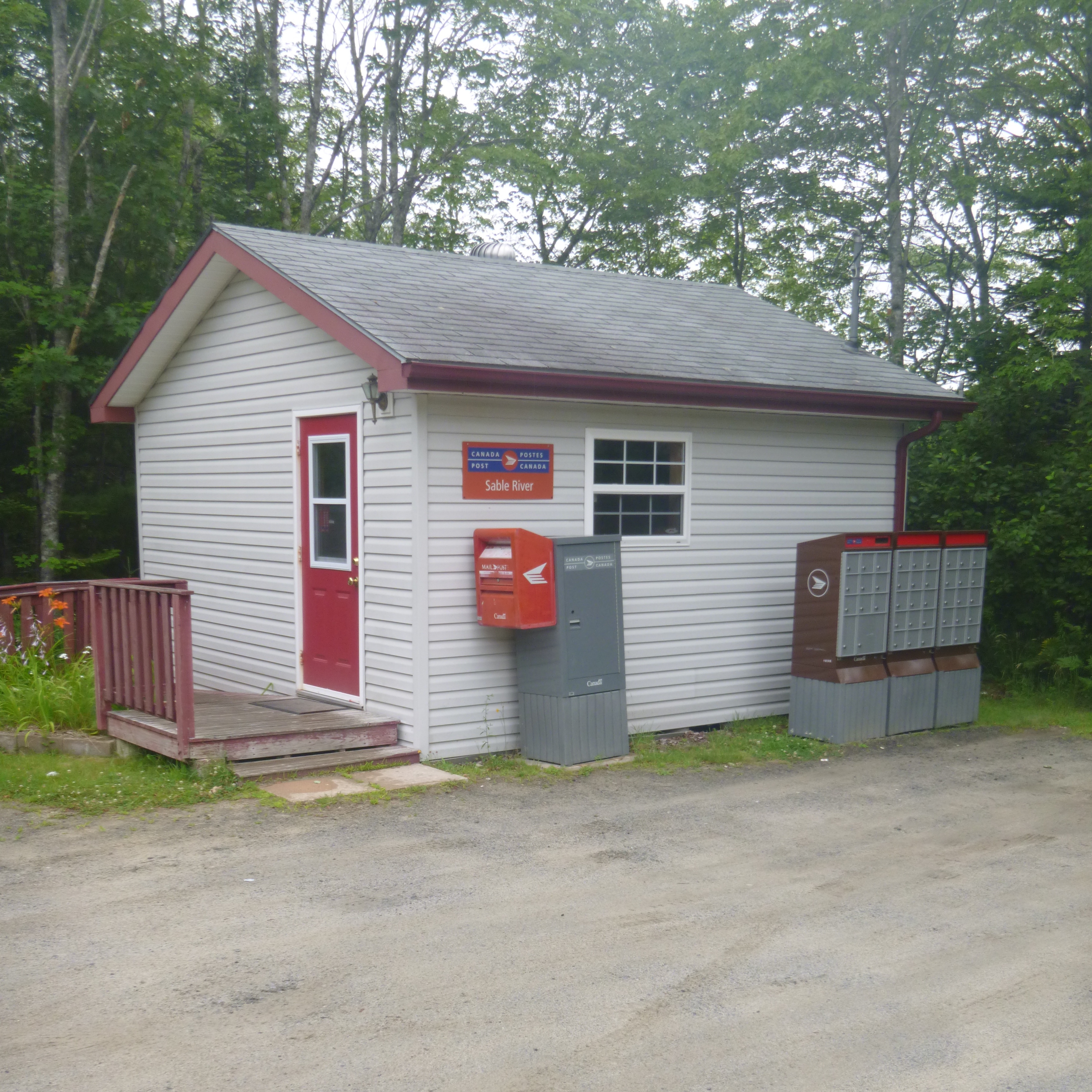
Sable River Post Office

Sable River is a rural community of the Municipality of the District of Shelburne in the Canadian province of Nova Scotia.

== Parks ==
- Sable River Provincial Park
