= Nova Scotia Route 309 =

Highway in Nova Scotia, Canada

Route 309

Route information
- Maintained by Nova Scotia Department of Transportation and Infrastructure Renewal
- Length: 29 km (18 mi)

Major junctions
- West end: Trunk 3 in Barrington
- East end: Trunk 3 in Clyde River

Location
- Country: Canada
- Province: Nova Scotia
- Counties: Shelburne

Highway system
- Provincial highways in Nova Scotia; 100-series
← Route 308	→ Route 311

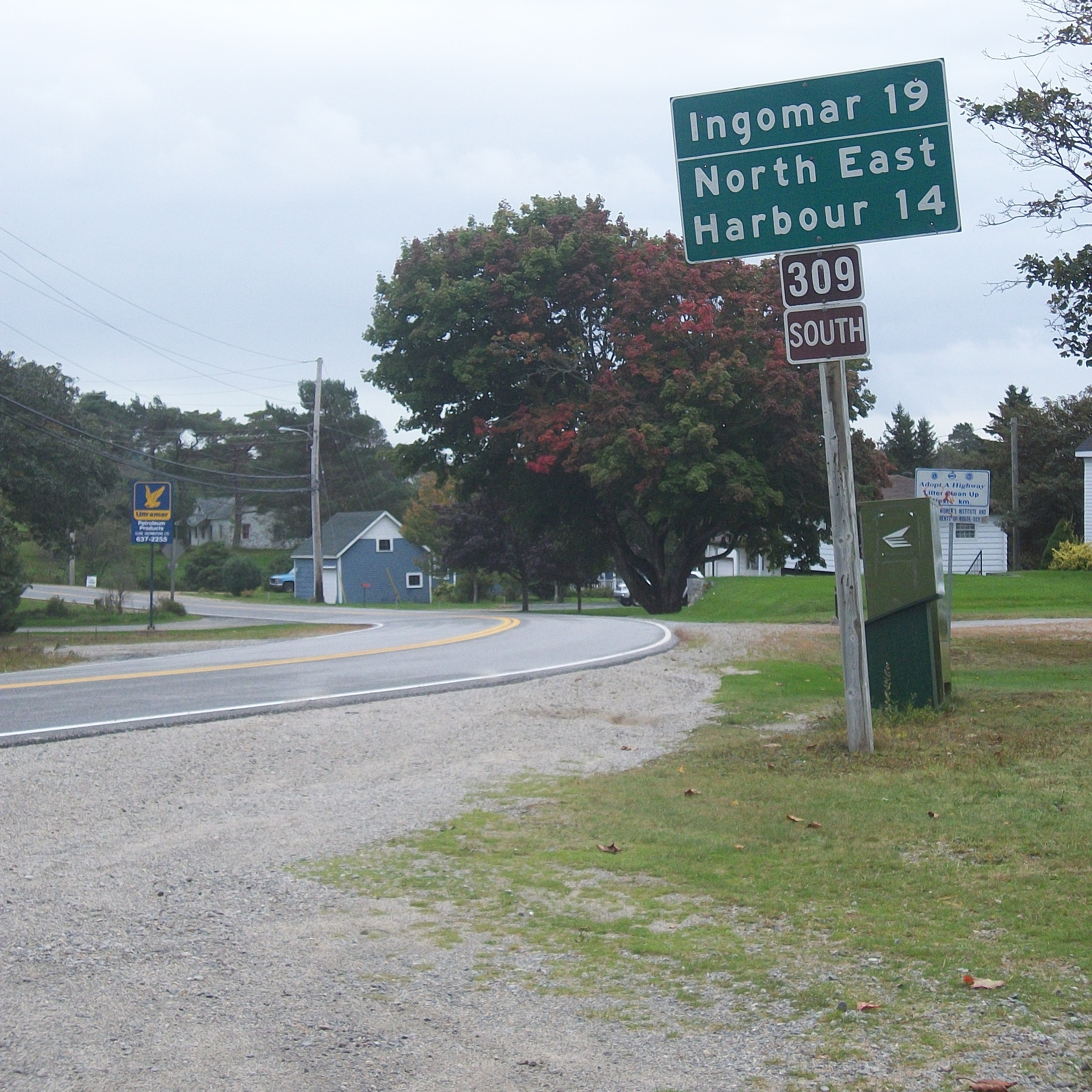
Route sign in Clyde River

Route 309 is a collector road in the Canadian province of Nova Scotia.

It is located in Shelburne County and connects Barrington at Trunk 3/Highway 103 with Clyde River at Trunk 3/Highway 103.

== Communities ==
- Barrington
- Coffinscroft
- Villagedale
- Upper Port La Tour
- Reynoldscroft
- Eel Bay
- Thomasville
- Port Clyde
- Clyde River

== Parks ==
- Sand Hills Provincial Park

== See also ==
- List of Nova Scotia provincial highways
