= Port Clyde, Nova Scotia =

Port Clyde
- Community
- Location of Port Clyde, Nova Scotia
- Coordinates: 43.605°N 65.468056°W
- Country: Canada
- Province: Nova Scotia
- County: Shelburne
- Municipal district: Shelburne
- Time zone: UTC-4 (AST)
  - Summer (DST): UTC-3 (ADT)
- Postal code(s): B0W 2S0
- Area code: 902
- Access Routes: Route 309

Port Clyde is a community in the Canadian province of Nova Scotia, located in the Shelburne Municipal District of Shelburne County.

The community was a notable producer of wooden sailing ships in the Age of Sail, including the schooner Codseeker which survived a famous shipwreck just after she was built in 1877.

== See also ==
- List of communities in Nova Scotia
