= Lockeport =

- Town
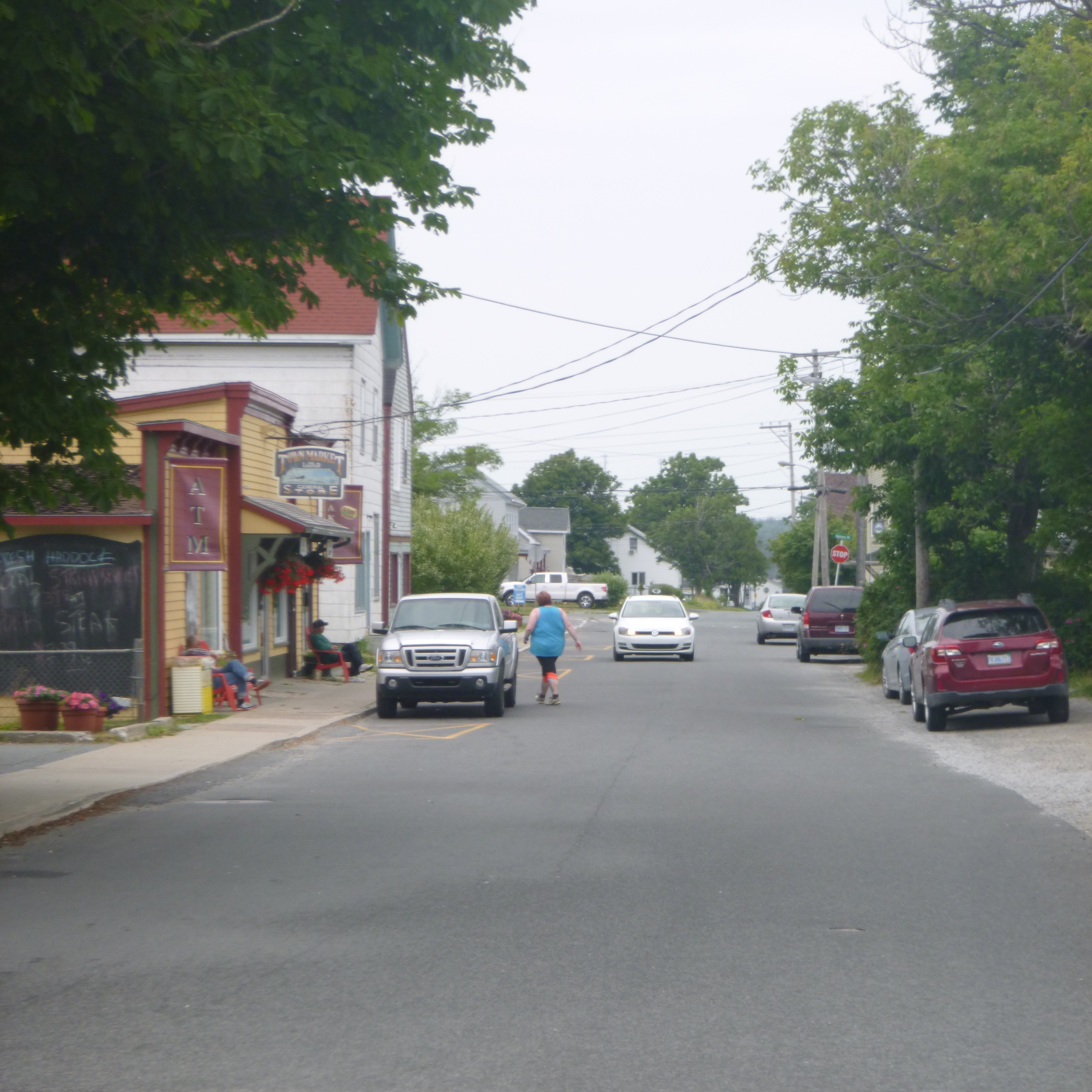
- Downtown Lockeport, Nova Scotia

- Seal

- Location of Lockeport, Nova Scotia
- Coordinates: 43°41′41.77″N 65°6′34″W
- Country: Canada
- Province: Nova Scotia
- County: Shelburne County
- Town: Lockeport
- Founded: 1762
- Incorporated: February 26, 1907

Government
  - Type: Town Council
  - Mayor: Derek Amalfa
  - Deputy Mayor: Anna Chetwynd
  - Governing Body: Town of Lockeport Council
  - MLA: Kim Masland (PC)
  - MP: Rick Perkins Conservative Party of Canada

Area (2021)
  - Total: 2.32 km^{2} (0.90 sq mi)
- Highest elevation: 3 m (9.8 ft)
- Lowest elevation: 0 m (0 ft)

Population (2021)
  - Total: 476
  - Density: 205.4/km^{2} (532/sq mi)
- Time zone: UTC-4 (AST)
  - Summer (DST): UTC-3 (ADT)
- Postal code: B0T 1L0
- Area code: 902
- Telephone Exchange: 656
- Median Earnings*: $50,800
- GNBC Code: CAUZR
- Website: www.lockeport.ns.ca
- Median household income, 2020 ($) (all households)

Lockeport is a town and port in Shelburne County, Nova Scotia, Canada. It is a traditional Nova Scotian fishing town, situated on a peninsula in Allendale Bay. It is connected to the mainland by the Crescent Beach causeway. The area that surrounds the bay is known as the "Ragged Islands."

== History ==
In 1762, two families from Massachusetts journeyed to Nova Scotia in an effort to find a new colony that was closer to the rich fishing grounds of the Grand Banks. When they found the sheltered Allendale Bay, they knew they had found a gem in the rough. Situated halfway between the colonies in New England and the fishing grounds, their new town would be a centre for both fishing and trade.

The patriarchs of those first two families, Jonathan Locke and Josiah Churchill, went on to become the captains of industry in the area. Churchill became the first mayor of the Township of Locke's Island (registered in Liverpool in 1764).

Locke's Island and its surroundings entered a period of booming industry, with hotels, trade warehouses and multiple fish plants being constructed. Large trade ships plied the sea lanes from Locke's Island to the West Indies to trade lumber and salt cod, returning to the town laden with molasses and salt. The fishing schooners were constantly returning from the Banks loaded with cod. However, this golden age of the Ragged Islands would eventually come to an end, with the first of many catastrophes coming in the form of a fish market collapse in the 1890s. Subsequent fires plagued the town, and the once great community was brought to its knees.

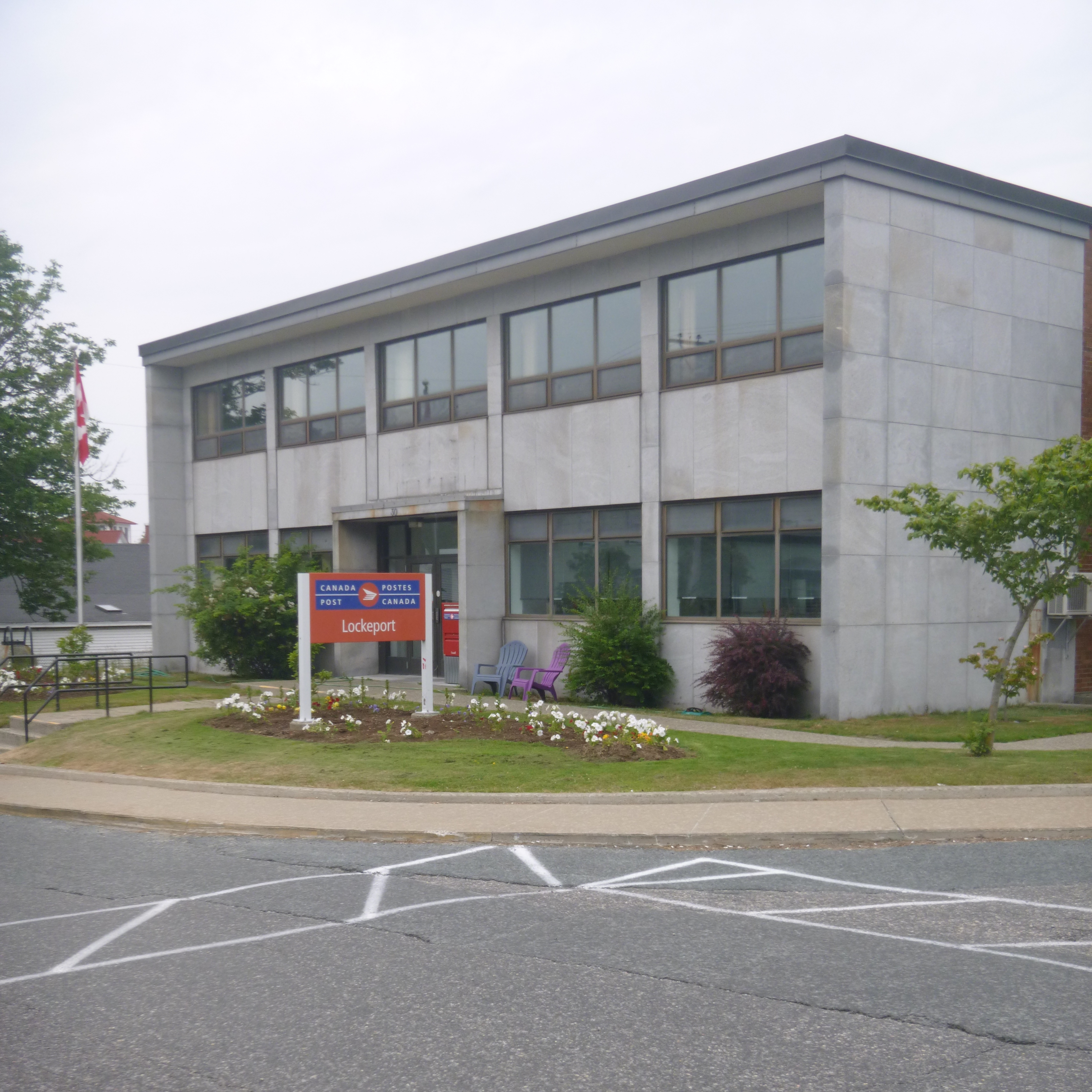
Lockport post office

In 1907, a meeting was held among the rate-payers of the town. It was obvious to all in attendance that drastic action would need to be taken in order to stimulate the economy of Locke's Island. They decided that the Township of Locke's Island would become the Town of Lockeport. By incorporating as a town, the community was able to receive money from the provincial government.

The money initially received by the town was used to construct a ferry that would link the town with a nearby rail line. This action did succeed in stimulating the declining economy, however, it was unable to restore the town to its former state of glory.

In 1939, Lockeport came to national attention when more than 600 fishers and fish handlers walked the picket line in front of the town's only employers, Swim Brothers and the Lockeport Company. Both fishplants had locked out their workers rather than recognize the Canadian Fishermen's Union as official bargaining agent. For eight weeks those locked out made one of the first major attempts by Nova Scotia fishers and fish handlers to win union recognition, and one of the first major tests of the N.S. Trade Union Act, passed in 1937. The Lockeport fishing lockout ended in November 1939 when the workers reached a settlement with the employers. The agreement included the recognition of the Canadian Fishermen's Union as the bargaining agent for the workers, along with improved wages and better working conditions. The end of the lockout marked a significant victory for the union and strengthened the labor movement in the fishing industry of Nova Scotia.

== Demographics ==
Historical population
Year	Pop.	±%
1956	1,207	—
1961	1,231	+2.0%
1981	929	−24.5%
1986	917	−1.3%
1991	798	−13.0%
1996	692	−13.3%
2001	701	+1.3%
2006	646	−7.8%
2011	588	−9.0%
2016	531	−9.7%
2021	476	−10.4%

In the 2021 Census of Population conducted by Statistics Canada, Lockeport had a population of 476 living in 234 of its 307 total private dwellings, a change of −10.4% from its 2016 population of 531. With a land area of 2.32 km^{2} (0.90 sq mi), it had a population density of 205.2/km^{2} (531.4/sq mi) in 2021.

== Festivals and culture ==
The town is home to a number of annual festivals that promote the heritage and culture of the Ragged Islands area. The Lockeport Sea Derby is a popular, family-oriented festival, which brings members of the community together to share in the area's rich fishing heritage.

The Annual Canada Day festivities promote a strong sense of local pride in the community.

Lockeport is also host to a popular women's music and arts festival, which celebrates the independence of women on the South Shore, known as Harmony Bazaar Festival of Women & Song.

== Sporting history ==
Lockeport is one of the most sport-infused communities in Nova Scotia, and perhaps Canada. Since 1950, the local High School has accumulated 44 provincial championships in basketball, soccer and track and field. The town has produced notable athletes including Marjorie Turner-Bailey, a sprinter who represented Canada at the 1976 Summer Olympics in Montreal, Walter Nickerson, the most successful dory-rowing athlete in Canada, and Ian MacMillan, a well-known basketball coach in Nova Scotia who spent time as an assistant coach in the National Basketball Association (NBA). Sporting events still attract large numbers of spectators. Lockeport is host to a number of indoor and outdoor recreational areas where youth continue to gather and play.

== Public library ==
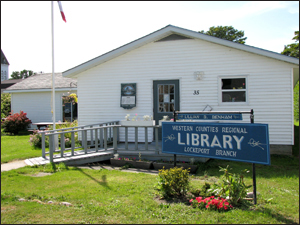
Lillian Benham Library

Located at 35 North Street in Lockeport, the Lillian Benham Library is one of the 10 branches of Western Counties Regional Library. It joined the Western Counties Regional Library on June 5, 1969, but it did not have a physical location in Lockeport until the first branch opened on April 13, 1973. The branch relocated to its present site on September 1, 1981; it then underwent an expansion, re-opening on August 22, 1987.

== See also ==
- List of municipalities in Nova Scotia
