= List of towns in Nova Scotia =

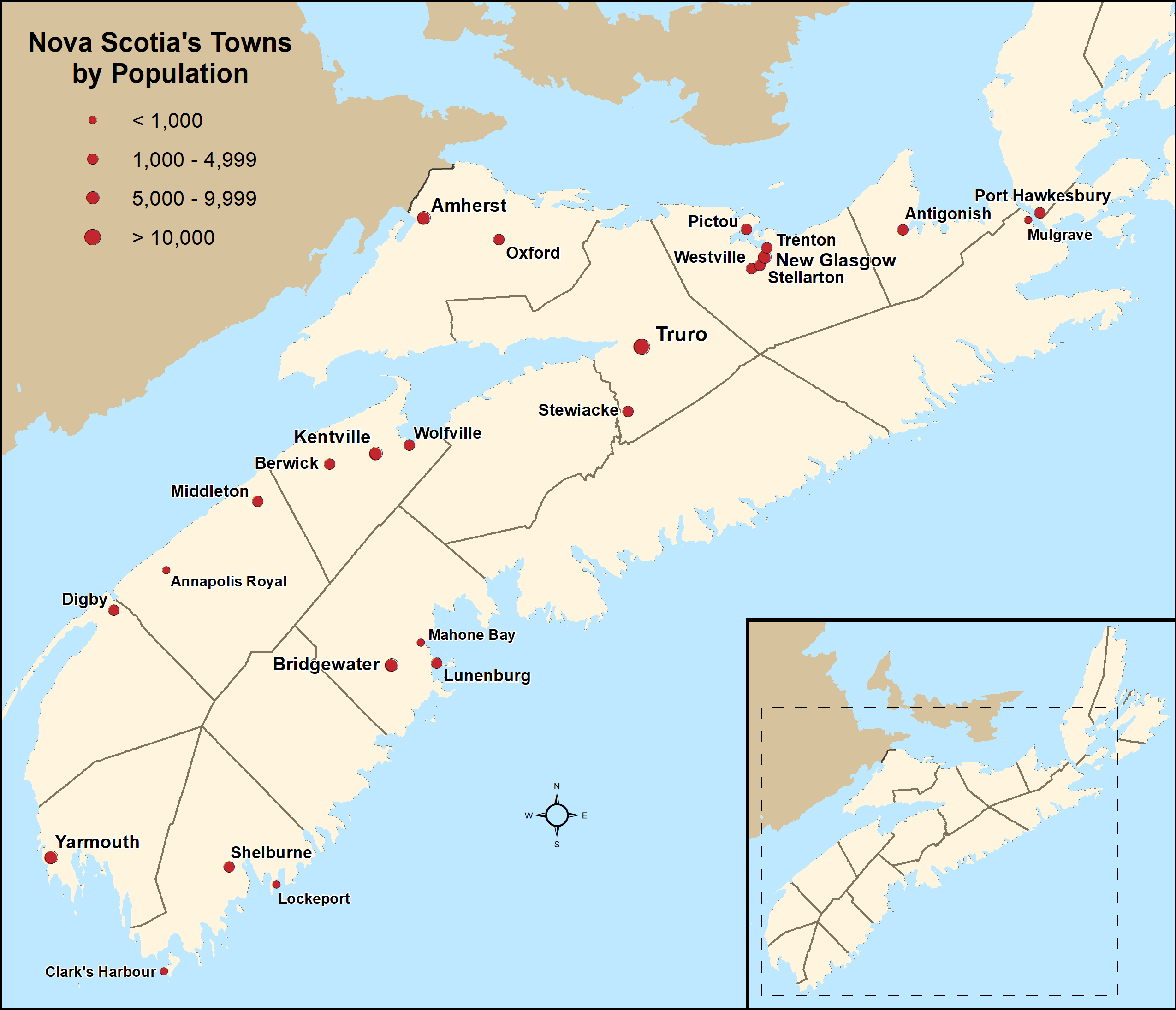
Distribution of Nova Scotia's 25 towns by population

A town is a type of municipality in the Canadian Province of Nova Scotia. Towns are incorporated by order by the Nova Scotia Utility and Review Board pursuant to sections 383 through 388 of Nova Scotia's Municipal Government Act.

Nova Scotia had 25 towns at the time of the 2021 Census. In 2021, the towns had a cumulative population of 96,580. Nova Scotia's largest and smallest towns are Truro and Lockeport with populations of 12,954 and 476 respectively.

== List ==
Name	Incorporation date	2021 Census of Population						
Name	Incorporation date	Population (2021)	Population (2016)	Change	Land area		Population density	
Name	Incorporation date	Population (2021)	Population (2016)	Change	km^{2}	sq mi	/km^{2}	/sq mi
Amherst	December 18, 1889	9,404	9,713	−3.2%	12.07	4.66	779.1	2,018
Annapolis Royal	November 29, 1892	530	491	+7.9%	1.98	0.76	267.7	693
Antigonish	January 9, 1889	4,656	4,364	+6.7%	4.98	1.92	934.9	2,421
Berwick	May 25, 1923	2,455	2,509	−2.2%	6.53	2.52	384.2	995
Bridgewater	February 13, 1899	8,790	8,532	+3.0%	13.63	5.26	644.9	1,670
Clark's Harbour	March 4, 1919	725	758	−4.4%	2.82	1.09	257.1	666
Digby	December 18, 1890	2,001	2,060	−2.9%	3.16	1.22	633.2	1,640
Kentville	May 1, 1886	6,630	6,271	+5.7%	17.08	6.59	388.2	1,005
Lockeport	February 26, 1907	476	531	−10.4%	2.32	0.90	205.2	531
Lunenburg	October 29, 1888	2,396	2,263	+5.9%	4.04	1.56	593.1	1,536
Mahone Bay	March 31, 1919	1,064	1,036	+2.7%	3.12	1.20	341.0	883
Middleton	May 31, 1909	1,873	1,832	+2.2%	5.55	2.14	337.5	874
Mulgrave	December 1, 1923	627	722	−13.2%	17.83	6.88	35.2	91
New Glasgow	May 6, 1875	9,471	9,075	+4.4%	9.96	3.85	950.9	2,463
Oxford	April 19, 1904	1,170	1,190	−1.7%	10.68	4.12	109.6	284
Pictou	May 4, 1874	3,107	3,186	−2.5%	7.99	3.08	388.9	1,007
Port Hawkesbury	January 22, 1889	3,210	3,214	−0.1%	8.1	3.1	396.3	1,026
Shelburne	April 4, 1907	1,644	1,743	−5.7%	8.75	3.38	187.9	487
Stellarton	October 22, 1889	4,007	4,208	−4.8%	8.99	3.47	445.7	1,154
Stewiacke	August 30, 1906	1,557	1,373	+13.4%	17.62	6.80	88.4	229
Trenton	March 18, 1911	2,407	2,474	−2.7%	6.07	2.34	396.5	1,027
Truro	May 6, 1875	12,954	12,261	+5.7%	37.52	14.49	345.3	894
Westville	August 20, 1894	3,540	3,628	−2.4%	14.24	5.50	248.6	644
Wolfville	March 4, 1893	5,057	4,195	+20.5%	6.46	2.49	782.8	2,027
Yarmouth	August 6, 1890	6,829	6,518	+4.8%	10.57	4.08	646.1	1,673
Total	—	96,580	93,847	+2.9%	242.06	93.46	399.0	1,033
Province of Nova Scotia	—	969,383	923,598	+5.0%	52,824.71	20,395.73	18.35	47.5

== Former towns ==
Name	Dissolution date	Population (2011)	Population (2006)	Change (%)	Area		Population density	
Name	Dissolution date	Population (2011)	Population (2006)	Change (%)	km^{2}	sq mi	/km^{2}	/sq mi
Bedford	April 1, 1996	23,019	16,601	38.7				
Bridgetown	April 1, 2015	949	972	−2.4	3.54	1.37	267.8	694
Canso	July 1, 2012	806	911	−11.5	5.42	2.09	148.8	385
Dominion	April 1, 1995	1,193	2,022	−3.4				
Glace Bay	April 1, 1995	19,076	19,968	−4.7	35.15	13.57	542.7	1,406
Hantsport	July 1, 2015	1,159	1,191	−2.7	2.13	0.82	544.6	1,411
Inverness		1,387	1,464	−5.5				
Joggins	1949							
Liverpool	April 1, 1996	2,653	2,759	−3.8	3.48	1.34	761.6	1,973
Louisbourg	April 1, 1995	946	988	−4.3	3.3	1.3	286.8	743
New Waterford	April 1, 1995	8,942	9,661	−7.4	20.81	8.03	429.7	1,113
North Sydney	April 1, 1995	6,048	6,552	−7.7				
Parrsboro	November 1, 2016	1,305	1,401	−6.9	14.88	5.75	87.7	227
Port Hood	August 1946							
Springhill	April 1, 2015	3,868	3,941	−1.9	11.15	4.31	346.8	898
Sydney Mines	April 1, 1995	14,135	15,500	−9.6				
Wedgeport	December 22, 1947	1,180	1,207	−2.2	9.72	3.75	121.4	314
Windsor	April 1, 2020	3,648	3,785	+3.8%	9.11	3.52	400.4	1,037

== See also ==
- Demographics of Nova Scotia
- Geography of Nova Scotia
- List of communities in Nova Scotia
- List of counties of Nova Scotia
- List of municipalities in Nova Scotia
- List of villages in Nova Scotia
- List of ghost towns in Nova Scotia
