= List of municipalities in Nova Scotia =

Location of Nova Scotia in Canada

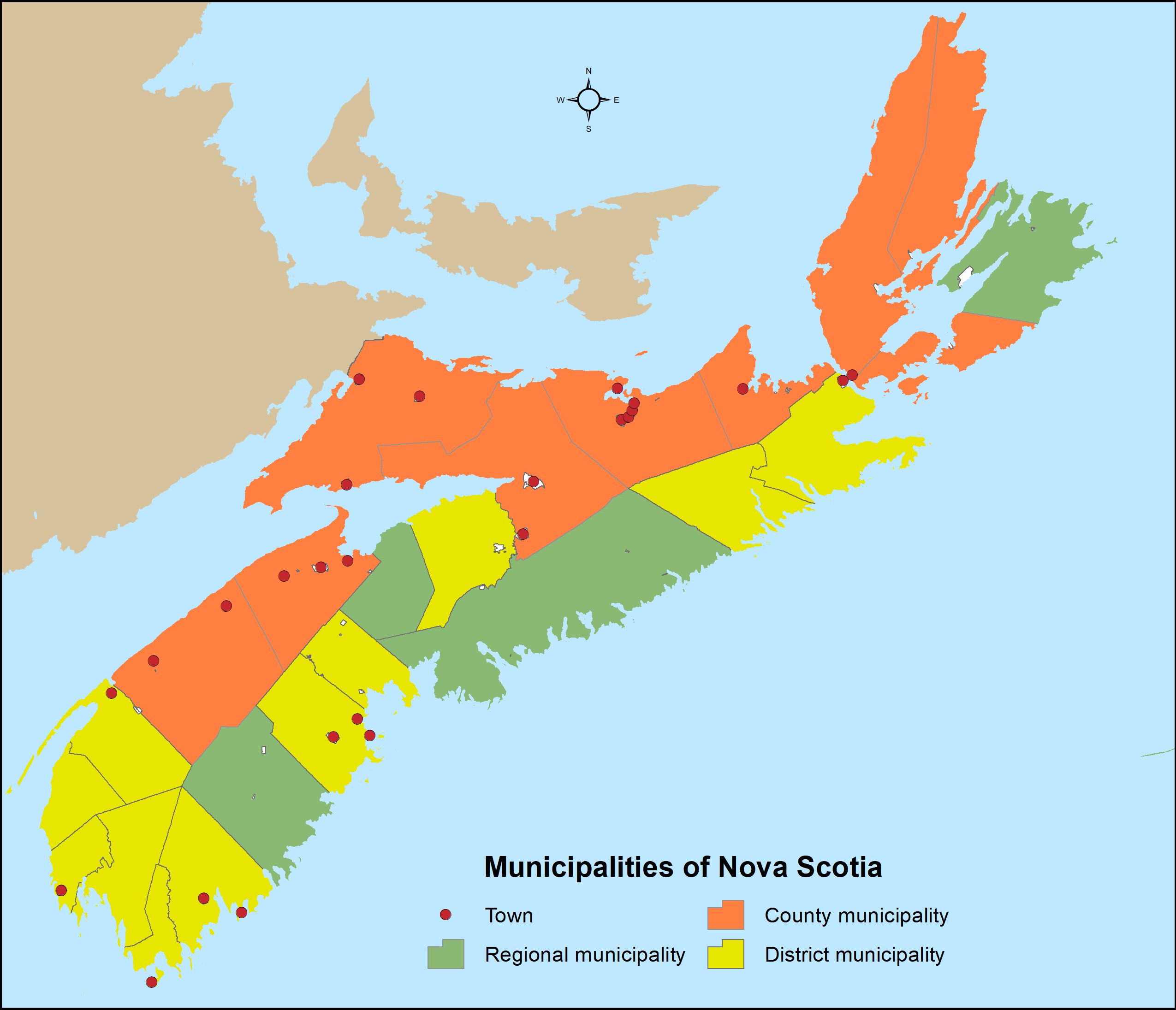
Distribution of Nova Scotia's 49 municipalities by municipal status type

Nova Scotia is the seventh-most populous province in Canada with 969,383 residents as of the 2021 Census of Population, and the second-smallest province in land area at 52,824.71 km^{2} (20,395.73 mi^{2}). Nova Scotia's 49 municipalities cover 99.8% of the territory's land mass, and are home to 98.7% of its population. (Note: The remaining 1.3% of Nova Scotia's population resides on Indian reserves, which occupy the remaining 0.2% of the province's land mass.)

Unlike the provinces of British Columbia, Ontario and Quebec, which have two-tiered municipal systems, Nova Scotia has a one-tier system of municipalities inclusive of four municipality types – regional municipalities, towns, county municipalities and district municipalities. Regional municipalities may incorporate under the Municipal Government Act (MGA) of 1998, which came into force on April 1, 1999, while towns, county municipalities and district municipalities are continued as municipalities under the MGA. The MGA gives municipal councils the power to make bylaws for "health, well being, safety and protection of persons" and "safety and protection of property" in addition to a few expressed powers.

Of its 49 municipalities, Nova Scotia has 4 regional municipalities, 25 towns, 9 county municipalities and 11 district municipalities. The regional municipality of Halifax is the capital and largest municipality of Nova Scotia by population with 439,819 residents representing 45% of the total population of the province and land area at 5,475.57 km^{2} (2,114.13 mi^{2}). Pictou was the first municipality to incorporate May 4, 1874, and the newest municipality is West Hants Regional Municipality that incorporated through an amalgamation of the Municipality of the District of West Hants and the Town of Windsor on April 1, 2020.

== Regional municipalities ==
Regional municipalities are incorporated under the authority of section 372 of Nova Scotia's Municipal Government Act. To consider the incorporation of a regional municipality, the Nova Scotia Utility and Review Board (NSUARB) must receive a request from all municipalities within a county. If the request is unanimous, the NSUARB commissions the preparation of a study to determine if the incorporation of "a regional municipality would be in the interests of the people of the county." Nova Scotia's Governor in Council can order the incorporation of a regional municipality if the results of the study are deemed to be in the best interests of the people, and if a plebiscite is undertaken that results in the majority of electors in the county voting in favour of incorporation of a regional municipality.

Nova Scotia has four regional municipalities. The largest regional municipality by population is Halifax, which is the capital and largest municipality of Nova Scotia by population. Halifax's 439,819 residents represent 45% of the total population of the province. Halifax is also the largest municipality by land area at 5,475.57 km^{2} (2,114.13 mi^{2}). Cape Breton Regional Municipality is the second largest municipality with a population of 93,694 and a land area of 2,419.70 km^{2}. The Region of Queens Municipality is Nova Scotia's smallest regional municipality by population with 10,422 residents and West Hants Regional Municipality is the smallest by land area 1,250.50 km^{2} (482.82 mi^{2}) respectively. The province's newest regional municipality is West Hants Regional Municipality.

== Rural municipalities ==
A rural municipality in Nova Scotia provides local government for rural areas outside incorporated towns. Rural municipalities were established in 1879 and are inclusive of county municipalities and district municipalities. District municipalities are within historical counties that were previously subdivided into districts, whereas county municipalities are within historical counties that were not previously subdivided into districts.

=== County municipalities ===
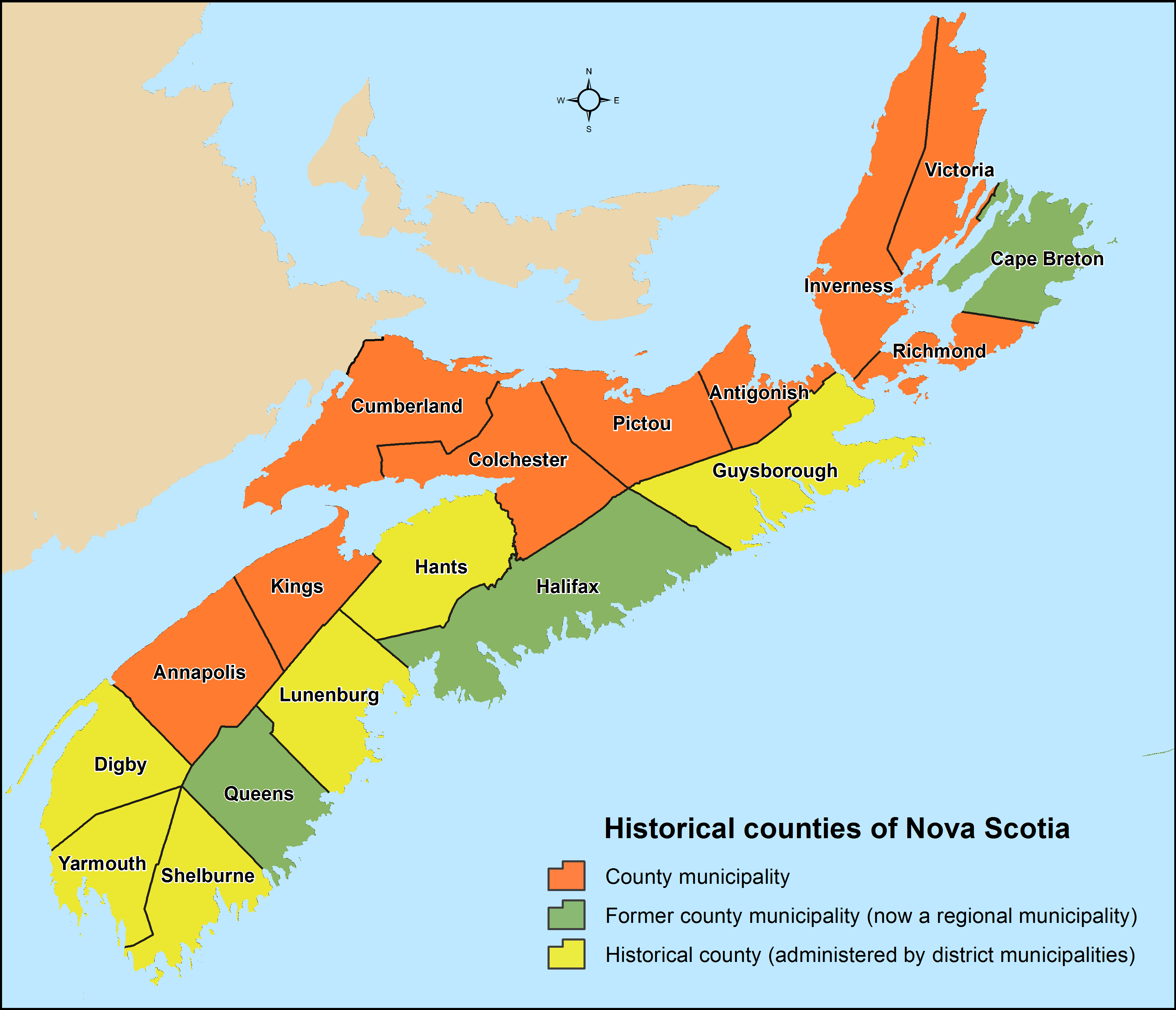
Distribution of Nova Scotia's 18 historical counties by municipal status

Nova Scotia's county municipalities originate from a historical system of 18 counties. Prior to the establishment of rural municipalities in 1879, local government was administered by appointed courts of sessions. On April 17, 1879, the original non-elected courts of sessions were abolished in favour of elected councils when The County Incorporation Act came into force. As a result, 12 county municipalities were established, while the remaining 6 counties, which were previously divided into districts for court sessional purposes, were established as district municipalities.

The province had 12 county municipalities for over a century until the mid-1990s when 3 became regional municipalities. Its 9 remaining county municipalities were then continued as county municipalities in 1998 under the authority of the Municipal Government Act. These county municipalities provide local government to the residents of their historical counties who live outside incorporated towns.

Nova Scotia's largest county municipality by population is the Municipality of the County of Kings at 47,918 residents, while the largest by land area is the Municipality of the County of Cumberland at 4,253.04 km^{2} (1,642.11 mi^{2}). The Municipality of the County of Victoria is the least populated county municipality at a population of 6,750. The Municipality of the County of Richmond is Nova Scotia's smallest county municipality by land area at 1,240.46 km^{2} (478.94 mi^{2}).

=== District municipalities ===
Prior to the establishment of elected rural local government in Nova Scotia, 6 of the 18 historical counties were divided into districts for court sessional purposes. On April 17, 1879, these 6 historical counties were established as 12 district municipalities, rather than county municipalities, based on their previous district divisions. The district municipalities provide local government to the residents of the 6 historical counties who live outside incorporated towns. On April 1, 2020, the Municipality of the District of West Hants amalgamated with the Town of Windsor to become a regional municipality, reducing the number of district municipalities in Nova Scotia to 11. These continue administratively as district municipalities under the authority of the Municipal Government Act of 1998.

Nova Scotia's largest and smallest district municipalities by population are Lunenburg and St. Mary's with 25,545 and 2,161 residents respectively. Nova Scotia's largest district municipality by land area is Guysborough at 2,115.25 km^{2} (816.70 mi^{2}), while the smallest by land area is Yarmouth at 584.69 km^{2} (225.75 mi^{2}).

== Towns ==
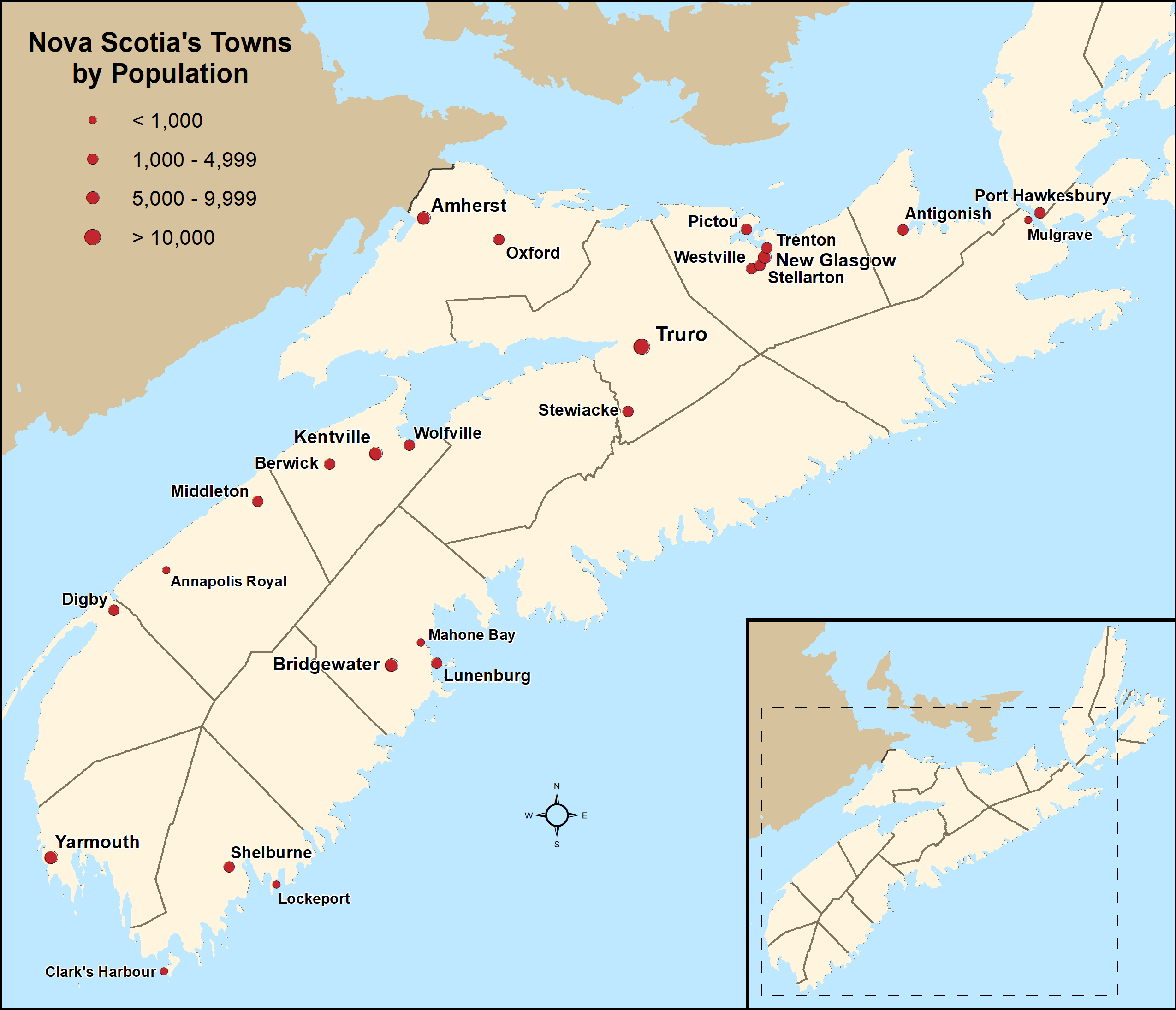
Distribution of Nova Scotia's 25 towns by population

Prior to mid-2015, towns were incorporated under the authority of sections 383 through 388 of Nova Scotia's Municipal Government Act (MGA). To incorporate an area as a town, 100 electors within the area were required to prepare and submit an application to the Nova Scotia Utility and Review Board (NSUARB). Upon receiving the application, the NSUARB would undertake a hearing to solicit input from interested parties and determine if there were reasonable grounds to incorporate as a town. The NSUARB would issue an incorporation order if the application was deemed reasonable. On May 11, 2015, sections 383 through 388 of the MGA were repealed, thereby preventing further incorporations of towns.

Nova Scotia had 27 towns at the time of the 2016 census. This total has since been reduced to 25 due to the dissolution of the Town of Parrsboro and the amalgamation of the Town of Windsor with the Municipality of the District of West Hants. In the 2021 census, the remaining 25 towns had a cumulative population of 96,580. Nova Scotia's largest and smallest towns by population are Truro and Lockeport with 12,954 and 476 residents respectively. Truro is also Nova Scotia's largest by land area at 34.49 km^{2} (13.32 mi^{2}) and Annapolis Royal is the smallest by land area at 1.98 km^{2} (0.76 mi^{2}).

== List of municipalities ==
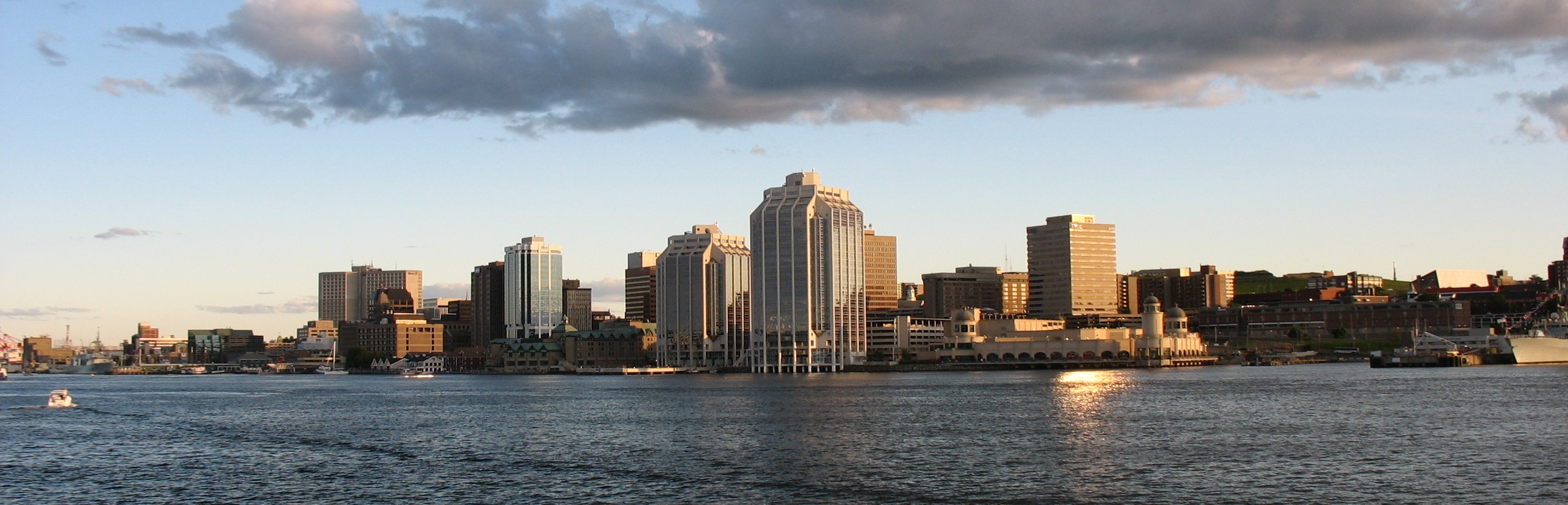
Halifax is Nova Scotia's capital and largest municipality by population.

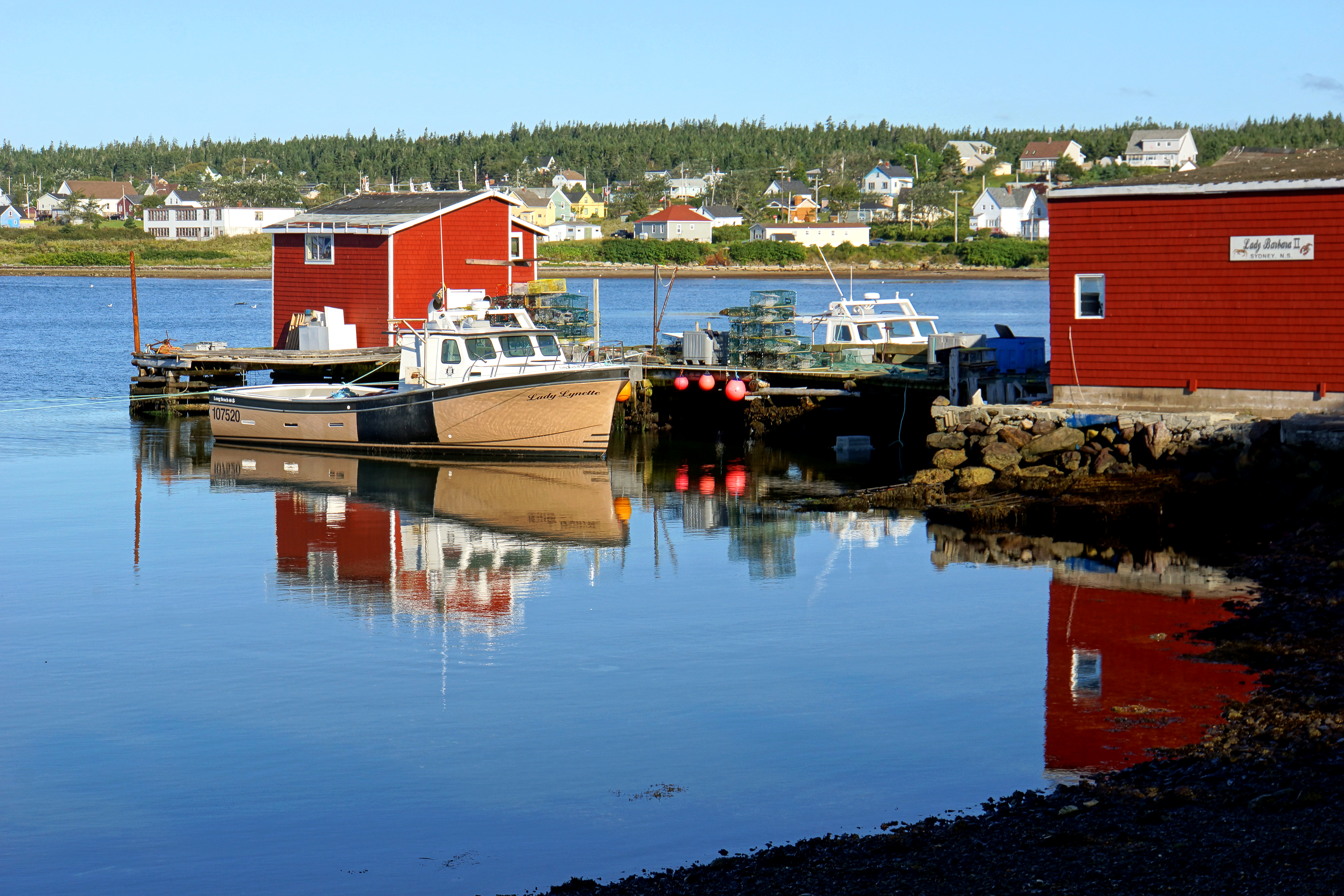
Harbour of Louisbourg in Cape Breton, Nova Scotia's second-most populated municipality

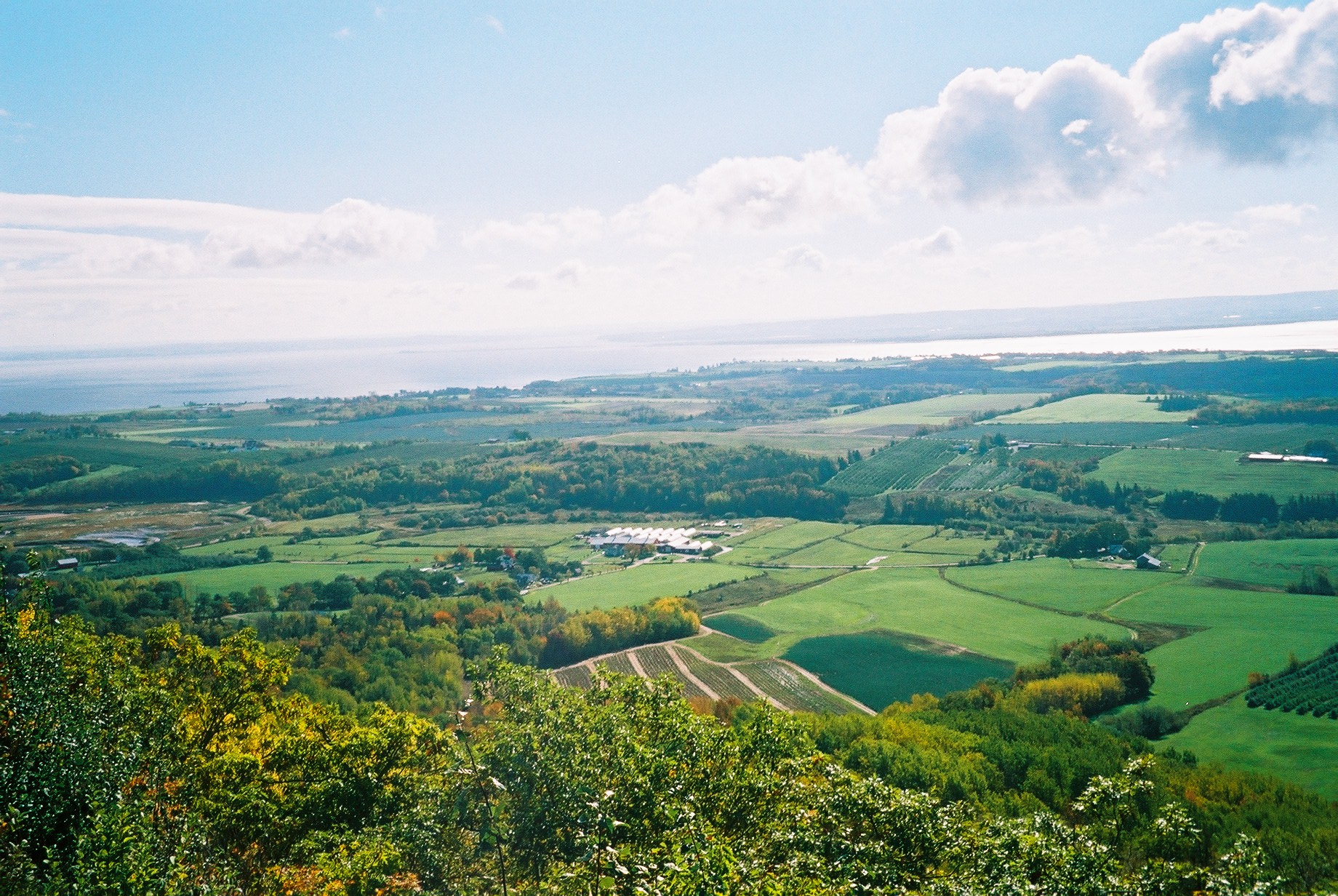
The Municipality of the County of Kings is Nova Scotia's largest county municipality by population.

List of municipalities in Nova Scotia
Name	Municipal type	County	Incorporation date	2021 Census of Population						
Name	Municipal type	County	Incorporation date	Population (2021)	Population (2016)	Change	Land area		Population density	
Name	Municipal type	County	Incorporation date	Population (2021)	Population (2016)	Change	km^{2}	sq mi	/km^{2}	/sq mi
Cape Breton	Regional municipality	Cape Breton	August 1, 1995	93,694	94,285	−0.6%	2,419.70	934.25	38.7	100
Halifax	Regional municipality	Halifax	April 1, 1996	439,819	403,131	+9.1%	5,475.57	2,114.13	80.3	208
Queens	Regional municipality	Queens	April 1, 1996	10,422	10,302	+1.2%	2,387.52	921.83	4.4	11
West Hants	Regional municipality	Hants	April 1, 2020	19,509	19,016	+2.6%	1,250.50	482.82	15.6	40
Annapolis (Note: Population and land area figures for the Municipality of the County of Annapolis are derived from summing the census results for its four county subdivisions (A, B, C and D).)	County municipality	Annapolis	April 17, 1879	18,834	18,252	+3.2%	3,172.36	1,224.86	5.9	15
Antigonish (Note: Population and land area figures for the Municipality of the County of Antigonish are derived from summing the census results for its two county subdivisions (A and B).)	County municipality	Antigonish	April 17, 1879	15,101	14,584	+3.5%	1,448.72	559.35	10.4	27
Colchester (Note: Population and land area figures for the Municipality of the County of Colchester are derived from summing the census results for its three county subdivisions (A, B and C).)	County municipality	Colchester	April 17, 1879	36,044	36,091	−0.1%	3,568.71	1,377.89	10.1	26
Cumberland (Note: Population and land area figures for the Municipality of the County of Cumberland are derived from summing the census results for its four county subdivisions (A, B, C and D).)	County municipality	Cumberland	April 17, 1879	19,964	19,402	+2.9%	4,253.04	1,642.11	4.7	12
Inverness (Note: Population and land area figures for the Municipality of the County of Inverness are derived from summing the census results for its three county subdivisions (A, B and C).)	County municipality	Inverness	April 17, 1879	13,239	13,170	+0.5%	3,795.34	1,465.39	3.5	9.1
Kings (Note: Population and land area figures for the Municipality of the County of Kings are derived from summing the census results for its four county subdivisions (A, B, C and D).)	County municipality	Kings	April 17, 1879	47,918	47,404	+1.1%	2,087.88	806.13	23.0	60
Pictou (Note: Population and land area figures for the Municipality of the County of Pictou are derived from summing the census results for its three county subdivisions (A, B and C).)	County municipality	Pictou	April 17, 1879	20,676	20,692	−0.1%	2,795.08	1,079.19	7.4	19
Richmond (Note: Population and land area figures for the Municipality of the County of Richmond are derived from summing the census results for its three county subdivisions (A, B and C).)	County municipality	Richmond	April 17, 1879	8,509	8,458	+0.6%	1,240.46	478.94	6.9	18
Victoria (Note: Population and land area figures for the Municipality of the County of Victoria are derived from summing the census results for its two county subdivisions (A and B).)	County municipality	Victoria	April 17, 1879	6,750	6,552	+3.0%	2,832.48	1,093.63	2.4	6.2
Argyle	District municipality	Yarmouth	April 17, 1879	7,870	7,899	−0.4%	1,526.07	589.22	5.2	13
Barrington	District municipality	Shelburne	April 17, 1879	6,523	6,646	−1.9%	631.98	244.01	10.3	27
Chester	District municipality	Lunenburg	April 17, 1879	10,693	10,310	+3.7%	1,120.61	432.67	9.5	25
Clare	District municipality	Digby	April 17, 1879	7,678	8,018	−4.2%	851.14	328.63	9.0	23
Digby	District municipality	Digby	April 17, 1879	7,242	7,107	+1.9%	1,654.59	638.84	4.4	11
East Hants	District municipality	Hants	April 17, 1879	22,892	22,453	+2.0%	1,786.53	689.78	12.8	33
Guysborough	District municipality	Guysborough	April 17, 1879	4,585	4,670	−1.8%	2,115.25	816.70	2.2	5.7
Lunenburg	District municipality	Lunenburg	April 17, 1879	25,545	24,863	+2.7%	1,757.79	678.69	14.5	38
Shelburne	District municipality	Shelburne	April 17, 1879	4,336	4,288	+1.1%	1,816.71	701.44	2.4	6.2
St. Mary's	District municipality	Guysborough	April 17, 1879	2,161	2,233	−3.2%	1,904.08	735.17	1.1	2.8
Yarmouth	District municipality	Yarmouth	April 17, 1879	10,067	9,845	+2.3%	584.69	225.75	17.2	45
Amherst	Town	Cumberland	December 18, 1889	9,404	9,413	−0.1%	12.07	4.66	779.1	2,018
Annapolis Royal	Town	Annapolis	November 29, 1892	530	491	+7.9%	1.98	0.76	267.7	693
Antigonish	Town	Antigonish	January 9, 1889	4,656	4,364	+6.7%	4.98	1.92	934.9	2,421
Berwick	Town	Kings	May 25, 1923	2,455	2,509	−2.2%	6.53	2.52	376.0	974
Bridgewater	Town	Lunenburg	February 13, 1899	8,790	8,532	+3.0%	13.63	5.26	644.9	1,670
Clark's Harbour	Town	Shelburne	March 4, 1919	725	758	−4.4%	2.82	1.09	257.1	666
Digby	Town	Digby	December 18, 1890	2,001	2,060	−2.9%	3.16	1.22	633.2	1,640
Kentville	Town	Kings	May 1, 1886	6,630	6,271	+5.7%	17.08	6.59	388.2	1,005
Lockeport	Town	Shelburne	February 26, 1907	476	531	−10.4%	2.32	0.90	205.2	531
Lunenburg	Town	Lunenburg	October 29, 1888	2,396	2,263	+5.9%	4.04	1.56	593.1	1,536
Mahone Bay	Town	Lunenburg	March 31, 1919	1,064	1,036	+2.7%	3.12	1.20	341.0	883
Middleton	Town	Annapolis	May 31, 1909	1,873	1,832	+2.2%	5.55	2.14	337.5	874
Mulgrave	Town	Guysborough	December 1, 1923	627	722	−13.2%	17.83	6.88	35.2	91
New Glasgow	Town	Pictou	May 6, 1875	9,471	9,075	+4.4%	9.96	3.85	950.9	2,463
Oxford	Town	Cumberland	April 19, 1904	1,170	1,190	−1.7%	10.68	4.12	109.6	284
Pictou	Town	Pictou	May 4, 1874	3,107	3,186	−2.5%	7.99	3.08	388.9	1,007
Port Hawkesbury	Town	Inverness	January 22, 1889	3,210	3,214	−0.1%	8.10	3.13	396.3	1,026
Shelburne	Town	Shelburne	April 4, 1907	1,644	1,743	−5.7%	8.75	3.38	187.9	487
Stellarton	Town	Pictou	October 22, 1889	4,007	4,208	−4.8%	8.99	3.47	445.7	1,154
Stewiacke	Town	Colchester	August 30, 1906	1,557	1,373	+13.4%	17.62	6.80	88.4	229
Trenton	Town	Pictou	March 18, 1911	2,407	2,474	−2.7%	6.07	2.34	396.5	1,027
Truro	Town	Colchester	May 6, 1875	12,954	12,261	+5.7%	37.52	14.49	345.3	894
Westville	Town	Pictou	August 20, 1894	3,540	3,628	−2.4%	14.24	5.50	248.6	644
Wolfville	Town	Kings	March 4, 1893	5,057	4,195	+20.5%	6.46	2.49	782.8	2,027
Yarmouth	Town	Yarmouth	August 6, 1890	6,829	6,518	+4.8%	10.57	4.08	646.1	1,673
Sub-total regional municipalities				563,444	526,734	+7.0%	11,533.29	4,453.03	48.9	127
Sub-total county municipalities				187,035	184,605	+1.3%	25,194.07	9,727.48	7.4	19
Sub-total district municipalities				109,592	108,332	+1.2%	15,749.44	6,080.89	7.0	18
Sub-total towns				96,580	93,847	+2.9%	242.06	93.46	399.0	1,033
Total municipalities				956,651	913,518	+4.7%	52,718.86	20,354.87	18.1	47
Province of Nova Scotia				969,383	923,598	+5.0%	52,824.71	20,395.73	18.4	48

== Former municipalities ==
Nova Scotia has undergone reforms to local government since the mid-1990s, which has seen various municipalities amalgamate to form larger municipalities or dissolve into surrounding municipalities.

=== Amalgamations ===
The Municipality of the County of Cape Breton, the City of Sydney, and the towns of Dominion, Glace Bay, Louisbourg, New Waterford, North Sydney, and Sydney Mines dissolved and amalgamated on April 1, 1995, to form the Cape Breton Regional Municipality. The City of Halifax along with the City of Dartmouth, the Town of Bedford and the Municipality of the County of Halifax also dissolved and amalgamated on April 1, 1996, to become the Halifax Regional Municipality. Also on April 1, 1996, the Municipality of the County of Queens amalgamated with the Town of Liverpool to form the Region of Queens Municipality. The latest amalgamation to occur involved the Town of Windsor and the Municipality of the District of West Hants merging to form the West Hants Regional Municipality on April 1, 2020.

=== Dissolutions ===
Five towns have dissolved since 2011 and are now under the jurisdiction of their adjacent rural municipalities. Canso dissolved on July 1, 2012, to become part of the Municipality of the District of Guysborough. On April 1, 2015, Bridgetown and Springhill dissolved to become parts of the Municipality of the County of Annapolis and the Municipality of the County of Cumberland respectively. Hantsport became part of the Municipality of the District of West Hants on July 1, 2015. Parrsboro dissolved to become part of the Municipality of the County of Cumberland on November 1, 2016.

== See also ==
- Demographics of Nova Scotia
- Geography of Nova Scotia
- List of census agglomerations in Atlantic Canada
- List of communities in Nova Scotia
- List of county municipality subdivisions in Nova Scotia
- List of designated places in Nova Scotia
- List of population centres in Nova Scotia
- List of villages in Nova Scotia
