= Demographics of Nova Scotia =

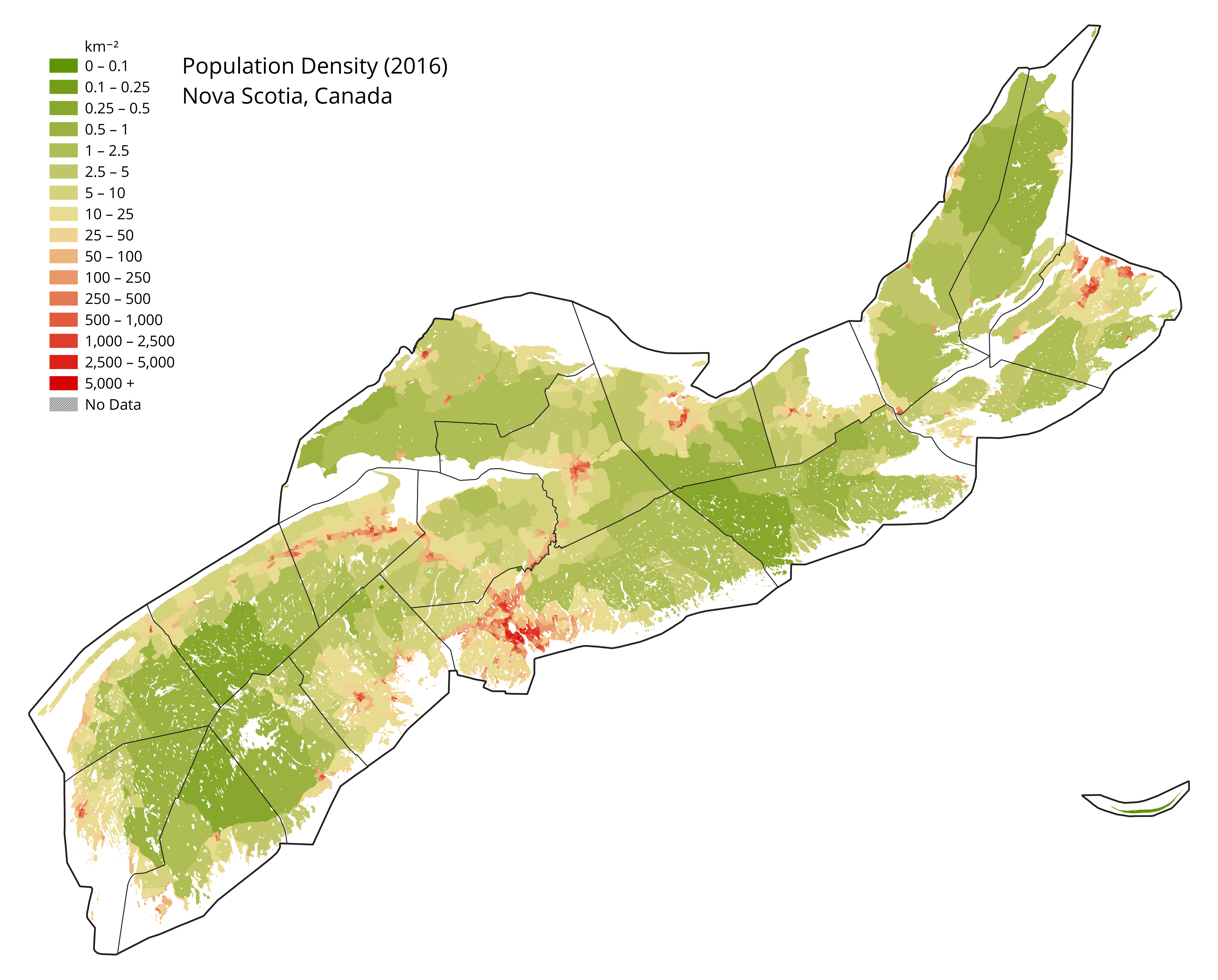
Canada Nova Scotia Density 2016

Nova Scotia (Latin for New Scotland; Mi'kmaq: Enmigtaqamu'g; French: Nouvelle-Écosse) is a Canadian province located on the country's southeastern coast. It is the most populous province in Atlantic Canada, and its capital, Halifax, is a major economic centre of the region. Geographically, Nova Scotia is the second smallest province in Canada, with an area of 52,824.71 km^{2} (20,395.73 sq mi). As of April 2024, it has a population of 1,072,545 people.

== Population history ==
View chart definition.

Year	Population	% change		Rank*
Year	Population	5-year	10-year	Rank*
1827	123,630	–	–	n/a
1837	199,906	–	62.0	n/a
1851	276,854	–	–	n/a
1861	330,857	–	19.5	n/a
1871	387,800	–	17.2	3
1881	440,572	–	13.6	3
1891	450,396	–	2.2	3
1901	459,574	–	2.0	3
1911	492,338	–	7.1	4
1921	523,837	–	6.4	7
1931	512,846	–	2.1	7
1941	577,962	–	12.7	7
1951	642,584	–	11.2	7
1956	694,717	8.1	–	7
1961	737,007	6.1	14.7	7
1966	756,039	2.6	8.8	7
1971	788,965	4.4	7.0	7
1976	828,570	5.0	9.6	7
1981	847,442	2.3	7.4	7
1986	873,175	3.0	5.4	7
1991	899,942	3.1	6.2	7
1996	909,282	1.0	4.1	7
2001	908,007	0.1	0.9	7
2006	913,462	0.6	2.8	7
2011	921,727	0.9	1.5	7
2016	923,598	0.2	1.1	7
2021	969,383	5.0	5.2	7

Source: Statistics Canada
* among provinces.
** Preliminary 2006 census estimate.

== Population geography ==
=== Population centres ===
The Halifax population centre is the largest urban area in Nova Scotia. Statistics Canada recognizes a total of 37 population centres in the province.

The below table is a list of those population centres in Nova Scotia from the 2021 Census of Population as designated, named, and delineated by Statistics Canada.

Rank	Population centre	Size group	Population (2021)	Population (2016)	Change	Land area		Population density	
Rank	Population centre	Size group	Population (2021)	Population (2016)	Change	km^{2}	sq mi	/km^{2}	/sq mi
1	Halifax	Large urban	348,634	317,334	+9.9%	238.29	92.00	1,463.1	3,789
2	Cape Breton - Sydney	Medium	30,960	30,170	+2.6%	30.91	11.93	1,001.6	2,594
3	Truro	Small	23,583	23,205	+1.6%	31.52	12.17	748.2	1,938
4	New Glasgow	Small	19,316	19,137	+0.9%	29.82	11.51	647.8	1,678
5	Glace Bay	Small	16,915	17,604	−3.9%	31.19	12.04	542.3	1,405
6	Kentville	Small	14,905	14,449	+3.2%	27.98	10.80	532.7	1,380
7	Sydney Mines	Small	12,353	12,823	−3.7%	18.11	6.99	682.1	1,767
8	Amherst	Small	9,548	9,550	0.0%	12.38	4.78	771.2	1,997
9	Bridgewater	Small	8,790	8,532	+3.0%	13.63	5.26	644.9	1,670
10	Yarmouth	Small	7,848	7,527	+4.3%	16.81	6.49	466.9	1,209
11	Kingston - Greenwood	Small	7,118	6,879	+3.5%	17.22	6.65	413.4	1,071
12	New Waterford	Small	6,723	7,416	−9.3%	9.23	3.56	728.4	1,887
13	Enfield - Lantz	Small	6,583	6,807	−3.3%	11.67	4.51	564.1	1,461
14	Antigonish	Small	5,620	5,079	+10.7%	5.88	2.27	955.8	2,476
15	Windsor	Small	5,514	5,248	+5.1%	10.56	4.08	522.2	1,352
16	Wolfville	Small	5,057	4,195	+20.5%	6.46	2.49	782.8	2,027
17	Still Water Lake	Small	3,379	3,447	−2.0%	8.23	3.18	410.6	1,063
18	Port Hawkesbury	Small	2,998	3,004	−0.2%	5	1.9	599.6	1,553
19	Springhill	Small	2,654	2,743	−3.2%	4.84	1.87	548.3	1,420
20	Pictou	Small	2,643	2,711	−2.5%	4.35	1.68	607.6	1,574
21	Eskasoni 3	Small	2,575	2,352	+9.5%	5.7	2.2	451.8	1,170
22	Liverpool	Small	2,546	2,549	−0.1%	3.59	1.39	709.2	1,837
23	Berwick	Small	2,455	2,517	−2.5%	4.31	1.66	569.6	1,475
24	Lunenburg	Small	2,405	2,262	+6.3%	3.35	1.29	717.9	1,859
25	Lake Echo	Small	2,365	2,515	−6.0%	4.76	1.84	496.8	1,287
26	Indian Brook 14	Small	2,332	655	+256.0%	3.89	1.50	599.5	1,553
27	Digby	Small	2,001	2,060	−2.9%	3.16	1.22	633.2	1,640
28	Hantsport	Small	1,542	1,560	−1.2%	2.89	1.12	533.6	1,382
29	Brookside	Small	1,439	1,441	−0.1%	2.81	1.08	512.1	1,326
30	Shelburne	Small	1,439	1,483	−3.0%	2.6	1.0	553.5	1,434
31	Middleton	Small	1,429	1,391	+2.7%	2.72	1.05	525.4	1,361
32	Chester	Small	1,371	1,362	+0.7%	3.23	1.25	424.5	1,099
33	Inverness	Small	1,228	1,248	−1.6%	2.73	1.05	449.8	1,165
34	Centreville	Small	1,159	1,129	+2.7%	2.36	0.91	491.1	1,272
35	Howie Centre	Small	1,106	1,157	−4.4%	1.67	0.64	662.3	1,715
36	Hayes Subdivision	Small	1,044	1,121	−6.9%	1.1	0.42	949.1	2,458
37	Port Williams	Small	1,030	1,120	−8.0%	1.92	0.74	536.5	1,390

=== Municipalities ===
Nova Scotia has four regional municipalities.

Name	Population (2021)	Population (2016)	Change (%)	Area (km²)	Population density
Cape Breton	93,694	94,285	−0.6%	2,419.70	38.7
Halifax	439,819	403,131	+9.1%	5,475.57	80.3
Queens	10,422	10,302	+1.2%	2,387.52	4.4
West Hants	19,509	19,016	+2.6%	1,250.5	15.6
Total regional municipalities	563,444	526,734	+7.0%	11,533.29	48.85

=== Towns ===
Nova Scotia has 25 towns.

Towns of Nova Scotia
Name	2021 Census of Population						
Name	Population (2021)	Population (2016)	Change	Land area		Population density	
Name	Population (2021)	Population (2016)	Change	km^{2}	sq mi	/km^{2}	/sq mi
Amherst	9,404	9,713	−3.2%	12.07	4.66	779.1	2,018
Annapolis Royal	530	491	+7.9%	1.98	0.76	267.7	693
Antigonish	4,656	4,364	+6.7%	4.98	1.92	934.9	2,421
Berwick	2,455	2,509	−2.2%	6.53	2.52	384.2	995
Bridgewater	8,790	8,532	+3.0%	13.63	5.26	644.9	1,670
Clark's Harbour	725	758	−4.4%	2.82	1.09	257.1	666
Digby	2,001	2,060	−2.9%	3.16	1.22	633.2	1,640
Kentville	6,630	6,271	+5.7%	17.08	6.59	388.2	1,005
Lockeport	476	531	−10.4%	2.32	0.90	205.2	531
Lunenburg	2,396	2,263	+5.9%	4.04	1.56	593.1	1,536
Mahone Bay	1,064	1,036	+2.7%	3.12	1.20	341.0	883
Middleton	1,873	1,832	+2.2%	5.55	2.14	337.5	874
Mulgrave	627	722	−13.2%	17.83	6.88	35.2	91
New Glasgow	9,471	9,075	+4.4%	9.96	3.85	950.9	2,463
Oxford	1,170	1,190	−1.7%	10.68	4.12	109.6	284
Pictou	3,107	3,186	−2.5%	7.99	3.08	388.9	1,007
Port Hawkesbury	3,210	3,214	−0.1%	8.1	3.1	396.3	1,026
Shelburne	1,644	1,743	−5.7%	8.75	3.38	187.9	487
Stellarton	4,007	4,208	−4.8%	8.99	3.47	445.7	1,154
Stewiacke	1,557	1,373	+13.4%	17.62	6.80	88.4	229
Trenton	2,407	2,474	−2.7%	6.07	2.34	396.5	1,027
Truro	12,954	12,261	+5.7%	37.52	14.49	345.3	894
Westville	3,540	3,628	−2.4%	14.24	5.50	248.6	644
Wolfville	5,057	4,195	+20.5%	6.46	2.49	782.8	2,027
Yarmouth	6,829	6,518	+4.8%	10.57	4.08	646.1	1,673
Total	96,580	93,847	+2.9%	242.06	93.46	399.0	1,033
Province of Nova Scotia	969,383	923,598	+5.0%	52,824.71	20,395.73	18.35	47.5

== Ethnic origins ==
Note: the percentages do not necessarily add up to 100% as multiple responses are allowed. Ethnic origins with less than 2% of the responses are not listed.

Ethnic origin (Canada 2016 Census)
Population group	Population	% of total population
Canadian	387,360	42.6%
Scottish	272,880	30.0%
English	262,375	28.9%
Irish	195,865	21.6%
French	149,625	16.5%
German	97,555	10.7%
First Nations (Indigenous North American)	48,640	5.4%
Dutch	32,045	3.5%
Métis	26,025	2.9%
Acadian	23,700	2.6%

== Visible minorities and Indigenous peoples ==
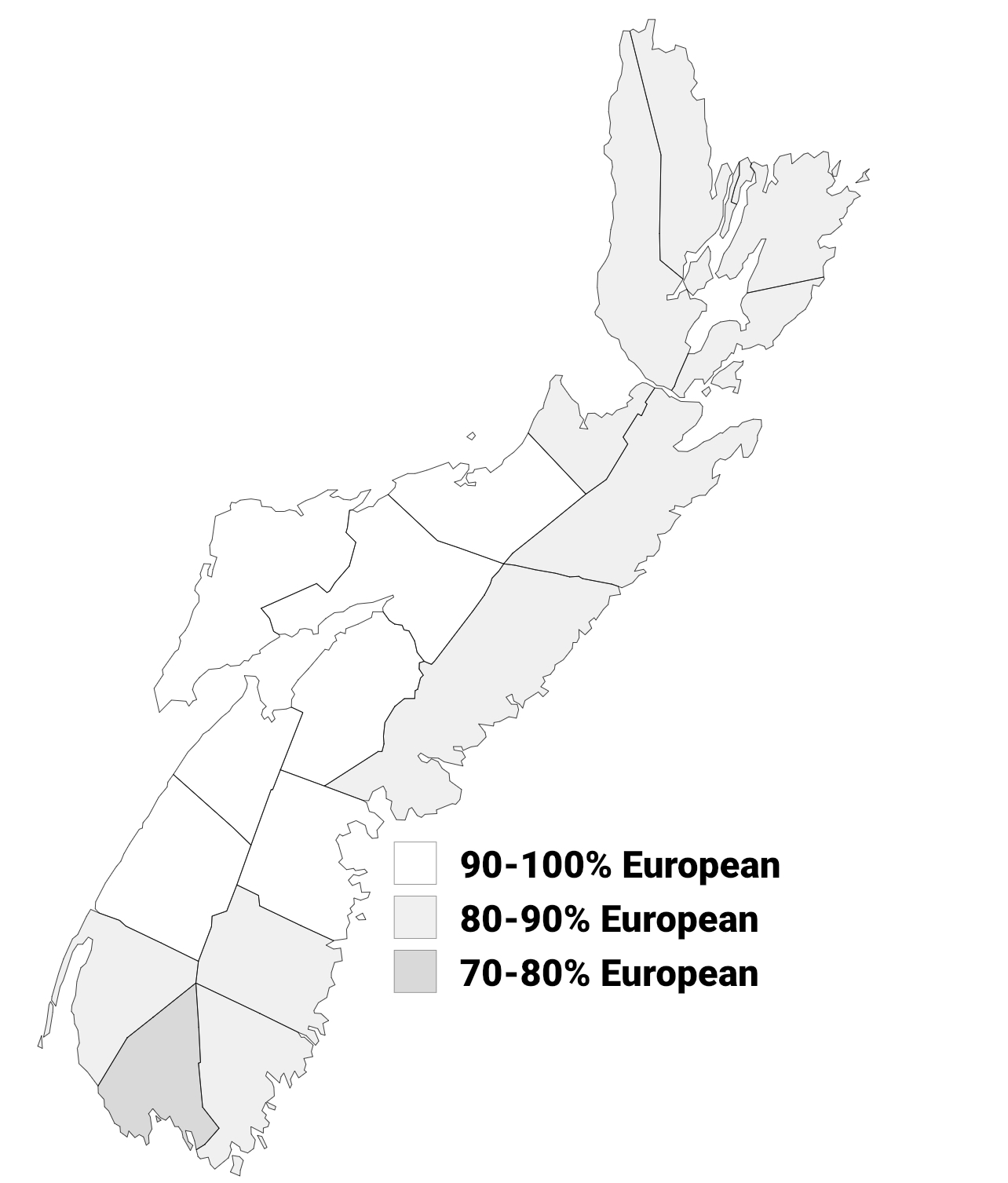
Largest Pan-Ethnic Group in Nova Scotia by Census Division Based on the 2021 Census

Visible minority & Indigenous population in Nova Scotia (1986–2021)
Group	Population	2021 census		2016 census		2011 census		2006 census		2001 census		1996 census		1991 census		1986 census	
Group	Population	Pop.	%	Pop.	%	Pop.	%	Pop.	%	Pop.	%	Pop.	%	Pop.	%	Pop.	%
Non-Indigenous / non-visible minority group	British Isles (Note: Including multiple responses.) (Note: 1996-present census populations for British Isles and French origins may be undercounts, due to the creation of the "Canadian" ethnic origin category. All citizens of Canada are classified as "Canadians" as defined by Canada's nationality laws. However, "Canadian" as an ethnic group has since 1996 been added to census questionnaires for possible ancestry. "Canadian" was included as an example on the English questionnaire and "Canadien" as an example on the French questionnaire. "The majority of respondents to this selection are from the eastern part of the country that was first settled. Respondents generally are visibly European (Anglophones and Francophones), however no-longer self identify with their ethnic ancestral origins. This response is attributed to a multitude or generational distance from ancestral lineage. Source 1: Jack Jedwab (April 2008). "Our 'Cense' of Self: the 2006 Census saw 1.6 million 'Canadian' Canadians Return to British and French origins" (PDF). Association for Canadian Studies. p. 2. Archived from the original (PDF) on October 2, 2011. "Virtually all persons who reported "Canadian" in 1996 had English or French as a mother tongue, were born in Canada and had both parents born inside Canada. This suggests that many of these respondents were people whose families have been in this country for several generations. In effect the "new Canadians" were persons that previously reported either British or French origins. Moreover in 1996 some 55% of people with both parents born in Canada reported Canadian (alone or in combination with other origins). By contrast, only 4% of people with both parents born outside Canada reported Canadian. Thus the Canadian response did not appeal widely to either immigrants or their children. Most important however was that nearly half of those persons reporting Canadian origin in 1996 were in Quebec this represented a majority of the mother tongue francophone population[...]In the 2001 Census, 11.7 million people, or 39% of the total population, reported Canadian as their ethnic origin, either alone or in combination with other origins. Some 4.9 million Quebecers out of 7.1 million individuals reported Canadian or "Canadien" thus accounting for nearly seven in ten persons (nearly eighty percent of francophones in Quebec)." Source 2: Don Kerr (2007). The Changing Face of Canada: Essential Readings in Population. Canadian Scholars' Press. pp. 313–317. ISBN 978-1-55130-322-2. Source 3: Jantzen (2006) Footnote 5: Note that Canadian and Canadien have been separated since the two terms mean different things. In English, it usually means someone whose family has been in Canada for multiple generations. In French it is referring to "Les Habitants", settlers of New France during the 17th and 18th centuries who earned their living primarily from agricultural labour. Source 4: Jantzen (2006): The reporting of French New World ancestries (Canadien, Québécois, and French-Canadian) is concentrated in the 4th+ generations; 79% of French-Canadian, 88% of Canadien and 90% of Québécois are in the 4th+generations category. Source 5: Jantzen (2005): According to Table 3, the 4th+ generations are highest because of a strong sense of belonging to their ethnic or cultural group among those respondents reporting the New World ancestries of Canadien and Québécois. Source 6: Jantzen (2006): For respondents of French and New World ancestries the pattern is different. Where generational data is available, it is possible to see that not all respondents reporting these ancestries report a high sense of belonging to their ethnic or cultural group. The high proportions are focused among those respondents that are in the 4th+ generations, and unlike with the British Isles example, the difference between the 2nd and 3rd generations to the 4th+ generation is more pronounced. Since these ancestries are concentrated in the 4th+ generations, their high proportions of sense of belonging to ethnic or cultural group push up the 4th+ generational results.)	495,625	51.85%	513,730	56.56%	547,230	60.39%	542,135	60.03%	491,555	54.77%	578,650	64.3%	726,975	81.6%	729,035	84.36%
Non-Indigenous / non-visible minority group	French	171,100	17.9%	173,740	19.13%	174,850	19.3%	170,295	18.86%	155,285	17.3%	174,145	19.35%	179,185	20.11%	165,770	19.18%
Non-Indigenous / non-visible minority group	Western European	115,120	12.04%	125,110	13.77%	125,775	13.88%	131,505	14.56%	115,810	12.9%	129,705	14.41%	140,360	15.75%	120,520	13.95%
Non-Indigenous / non-visible minority group	European, n.i.e. & n.o.s.	47,860	5.01%	3,145	0.35%	5,215	0.58%	4,375	0.48%	31,350	3.49%	3,940	0.44%	4,470	0.5%	4,405	0.51%
Non-Indigenous / non-visible minority group	Southern European	31,355	3.28%	28,680	3.16%	26,440	2.92%	25,265	2.8%	21,050	2.35%	20,065	2.23%	19,235	2.16%	14,655	1.7%
Non-Indigenous / non-visible minority group	Eastern European	30,735	3.22%	29,685	3.27%	26,515	2.93%	25,295	2.8%	20,695	2.31%	18,835	2.09%	19,015	2.13%	16,005	1.85%
Non-Indigenous / non-visible minority group	Northern European	19,685	2.06%	14,980	1.65%	14,640	1.62%	13,805	1.53%	10,285	1.15%	10,065	1.12%	8,270	0.93%	5,990	0.69%
Total non-Indigenous / non-visible minority population (Note: Single responses only unless otherwise specified.)		810,000	84.74%	798,200	87.87%	825,055	91.05%	841,230	93.15%	846,030	94.26%	856,665	95.19%	838,065	94.06%	825,555	95.53%
Visible minority (Note: Statistics Canada defines visible minorities as defined in the Employment Equity Act which defines visible minorities as "persons, other than Aboriginal peoples, who are non-Caucasian in race or non-white in colour".) group	Black	28,220	2.95%	21,915	2.41%	20,785	2.29%	19,225	2.13%	19,670	2.19%	18,110	2.01%	16,625	1.87%	13,600	1.57%
Visible minority group	South Asian	21,650	2.26%	7,910	0.87%	4,960	0.55%	3,810	0.42%	2,890	0.32%	3,295	0.37%	2,750	0.31%	2,315	0.27%
Visible minority group	Chinese	11,595	1.21%	8,645	0.95%	6,050	0.67%	4,300	0.48%	3,290	0.37%	3,210	0.36%	2,695	0.3%	1,850	0.21%
Visible minority group	Arab	10,605	1.11%	8,110	0.89%	6,285	0.69%	4,505	0.5%	3,615	0.4%	—N/a	—N/a	—N/a	—N/a	—N/a	—N/a
Visible minority group	Filipino	6,615	0.69%	3,405	0.37%	1,890	0.21%	700	0.08%	655	0.07%	615	0.07%	315	0.04%	275	0.03%
Visible minority group	Latin American	2,910	0.3%	1,685	0.19%	1,360	0.15%	950	0.11%	520	0.06%	315	0.04%	625	0.07%	465	0.05%
Visible minority group	Korean	2,840	0.3%	1,540	0.17%	955	0.11%	800	0.09%	585	0.07%	295	0.03%	200	0.02%	25	0%
Visible minority group	Multiple visible minorities	2,750	0.29%	1,390	0.15%	1,290	0.14%	1,030	0.11%	535	0.06%	450	0.05%	385	0.04%	405	0.05%
Visible minority group	Southeast Asian	2,405	0.25%	1,190	0.13%	1,160	0.13%	815	0.09%	790	0.09%	680	0.08%	795	0.09%	565	0.07%
Visible minority group	West Asian	1,875	0.2%	1,540	0.17%	1,365	0.15%	780	0.09%	385	0.04%	—N/a	—N/a	—N/a	—N/a	—N/a	—N/a
Visible minority group	Japanese	985	0.1%	695	0.08%	445	0.05%	505	0.06%	420	0.05%	360	0.04%	305	0.03%	135	0.02%
Visible minority group	Visible minority, n.i.e.	970	0.1%	635	0.07%	720	0.08%	255	0.03%	1,170	0.13%	250	0.03%	55	0.01%	10	0%
Visible minority group	Arab/West Asian	—N/a	—N/a	—N/a	—N/a	—N/a	—N/a	—N/a	—N/a	—N/a	—N/a	3,745	0.42%	5,985	0.67%	4,765	0.55%
Total visible minority population		93,430	9.77%	58,650	6.46%	47,270	5.22%	37,685	4.17%	34,525	3.85%	31,320	3.48%	30,725	3.45%	24,390	2.82%
Indigenous (Note: Statistics Canada defines Indigenous identity as persons who identify with the Indigenous Peoples of Canada.) group	First Nations	28,050	2.93%	25,830	2.84%	21,895	2.42%	15,240	1.69%	12,920	1.44%	10,910	1.21%	19,950 (Note: Including multiple Indigenous responses.)	2.24%	12,780	1.48%
Indigenous group	Métis	21,090	2.21%	23,315	2.57%	10,050	1.11%	7,680	0.85%	3,135	0.35%	825	0.09%	1,590	0.18%	890	0.1%
Indigenous group	Indigenous responses, n.i.e.	1,305	0.14%	720	0.08%	980	0.11%	830	0.09%	555	0.06%	—N/a	—N/a	—N/a	—N/a	—N/a	—N/a
Indigenous group	Inuk (Inuit)	1,100	0.12%	790	0.09%	695	0.08%	320	0.04%	345	0.04%	210	0.02%	770	0.09%	285	0.03%
Indigenous group	Multiple Indigenous responses	885	0.09%	835	0.09%	225	0.02%	100	0.01%	55	0.01%	30	0%	—N/a	—N/a	250	0.03%
Total Indigenous population		52,430	5.49%	51,490	5.67%	33,845	3.73%	24,175	2.68%	17,015	1.9%	11,985	1.33%	22,160	2.49%	14,205	1.64%
Total responses		955,860	98.6%	908,340	98.35%	906,170	98.31%	903,090	98.86%	897,570	98.85%	899,970	98.98%	890,950	99%	864,150	98.97%
Total population		969,383	100%	923,598	100%	921,727	100%	913,462	100%	908,007	100%	909,282	100%	899,942	100%	873,175	100%

== Language ==
=== Knowledge of languages ===
Knowledge of official languages of Canada in Nova Scotia (2016)
Language	Percent
English only	89.17%
French only	0.08%
English and French	10.45%
Neither English nor French	0.30%

The question on knowledge of languages allows for multiple responses. The following figures are from the 2021 Canadian Census and the 2016 Canadian Census, and lists languages that were selected by at least 0.5 per cent of respondents.

Knowledge of languages in Nova Scotia
Language	2021		2016	
Language	Pop.	%	Pop.	%
English	951,945	99.59%	905,020	99.63%
French	99,300	10.39%	95,740	10.54%
Arabic	11,745	1.23%	9,685	1.07%
Hindi	10,115	1.06%	N/A	<0.5%
Spanish	8,675	0.91%	6,990	0.77%
Mandarin	8,525	0.89%	5,435	0.6%
Punjabi	6,730	0.7%	N/A	<0.5%
German	6,665	0.7%	6,335	0.7%
Miꞌkmaq	5,650	0.59%	5,540	0.61%
Tagalog	5,595	0.59%	N/A	<0.5%

=== Mother tongue ===
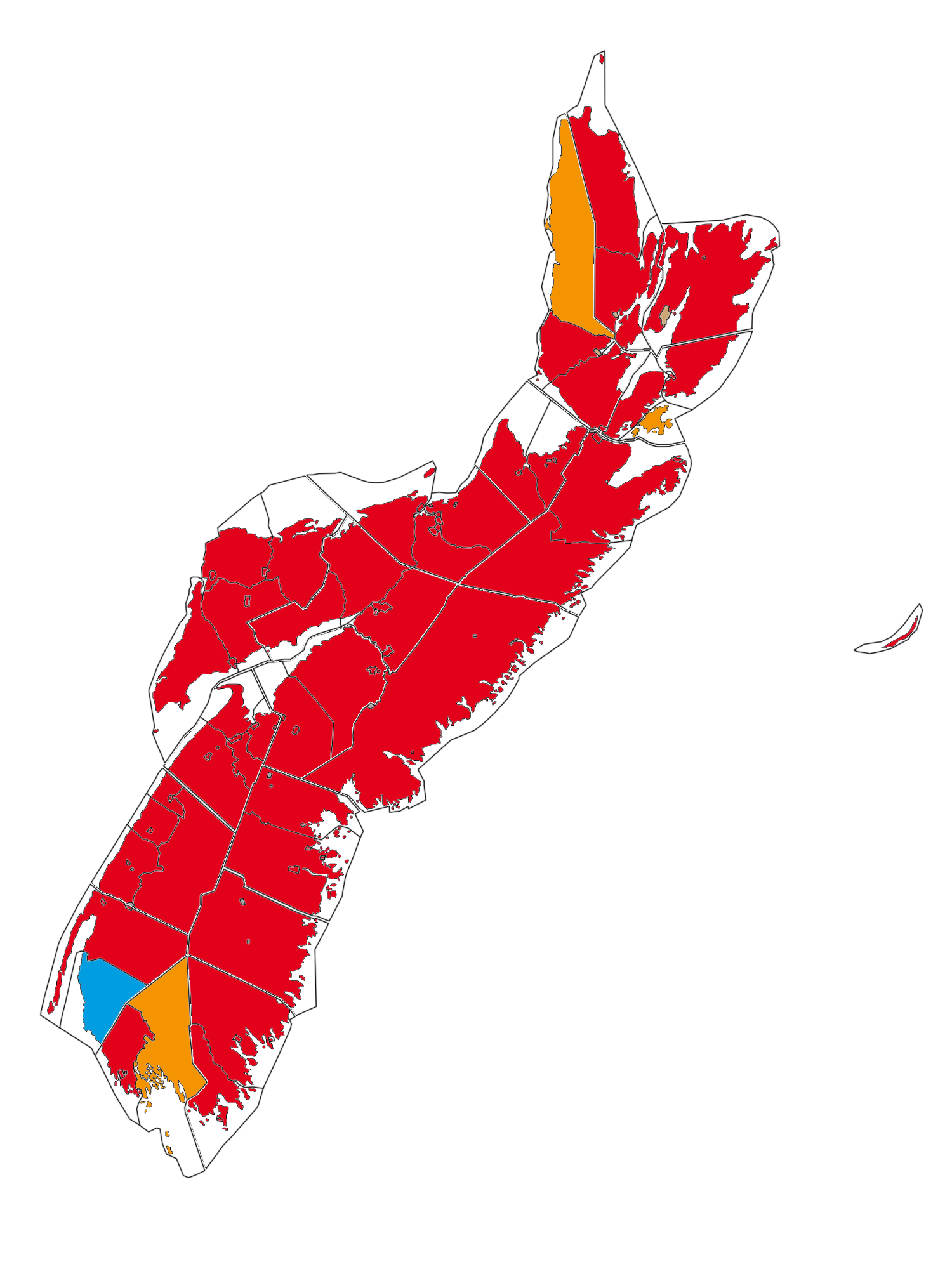
Mother tongue in Nova Scotia: Red – majority anglophone, Orange – mixed, Blue – majority francophone, Brown- majority mi'kmaw.

The 2021 Canadian census showed a population of 969,383.
Of the 941,105 singular responses to the census question concerning mother tongue the most commonly reported languages were:

Ranking	Language	Population	Percentage
1.	English	851,545	90.48%
2.	French	27,340	2.91%
3.	Arabic	7,960	0.85%
4.	Mandarin	6,730	0.72%
5.	Punjabi	4,550	0.48%
6.	Tagalog	3,240	0.34%
7.	Mi'kmaq	3,145	0.33%
8.	German	3,050	0.32%
9.	Spanish	2,680	0.28%
10.	Korean	2,340	0.25%
11.	Hindi	2,035	0.22%
12.	Malayalam	1,975	0.21%
13.	Russian	1,735	0.18%
14.	Persian	1,435	0.15%
15.	Dutch	1,395	0.15%
16.	Portuguese	1,305	0.14%
17.	Yue (Cantonese)	1,250	0.13%
18.	Gujarati	1,160	0.12%
19.	Urdu	965	0.10%
20.	Vietnamese	950	0.10%
21.	Bengali	890	0.09%
22.	Polish	870	0.09%
23.	Telugu	750	0.08%
24.	Italian	730	0.08%
25.	Greek	710	0.08%
26.	Serbo-Croatian	580	0.06%
27.	Tamil	555	0.06%

== Religion ==
Religious groups in Nova Scotia (1981−2021)
Religious group	2021 Canadian census		2011 Canadian census		2001 Canadian census		1991 Canadian census		1981 Canadian census	
Religious group	Pop.	%	Pop.	%	Pop.	%	Pop.	%	Pop.	%
Christianity	556,115	58.18%	690,460	76.19%	780,530	86.96%	815,815	91.57%	800,325	95.3%
Irreligion	359,395	37.6%	197,665	21.81%	106,405	11.85%	68,010	7.63%	34,335	4.09%
Islam	14,715	1.54%	8,505	0.94%	3,545	0.39%	1,435	0.16%	790	0.09%
Hinduism	8,460	0.89%	1,850	0.2%	1,235	0.14%	970	0.11%	1,025	0.12%
Sikhism	4,735	0.5%	390	0.04%	270	0.03%	330	0.04%	275	0.03%
Buddhism	2,955	0.31%	2,205	0.24%	1,735	0.19%	1,485	0.17%	420	0.05%
Judaism	2,195	0.23%	1,805	0.2%	2,120	0.24%	1,950	0.22%	2,010	0.24%
Indigenous spirituality	1,090	0.11%	570	0.06%	270	0.03%	45	0.01%	15	0%
Other	6,195	0.65%	2,720	0.3%	1,450	0.16%	910	0.1%	605	0.07%
Total responses	955,855	98.6%	906,175	98.31%	897,570	98.85%	890,950	99%	839,800	99.1%
Total population	969,383	100%	921,727	100%	908,007	100%	899,942	100%	847,442	100%

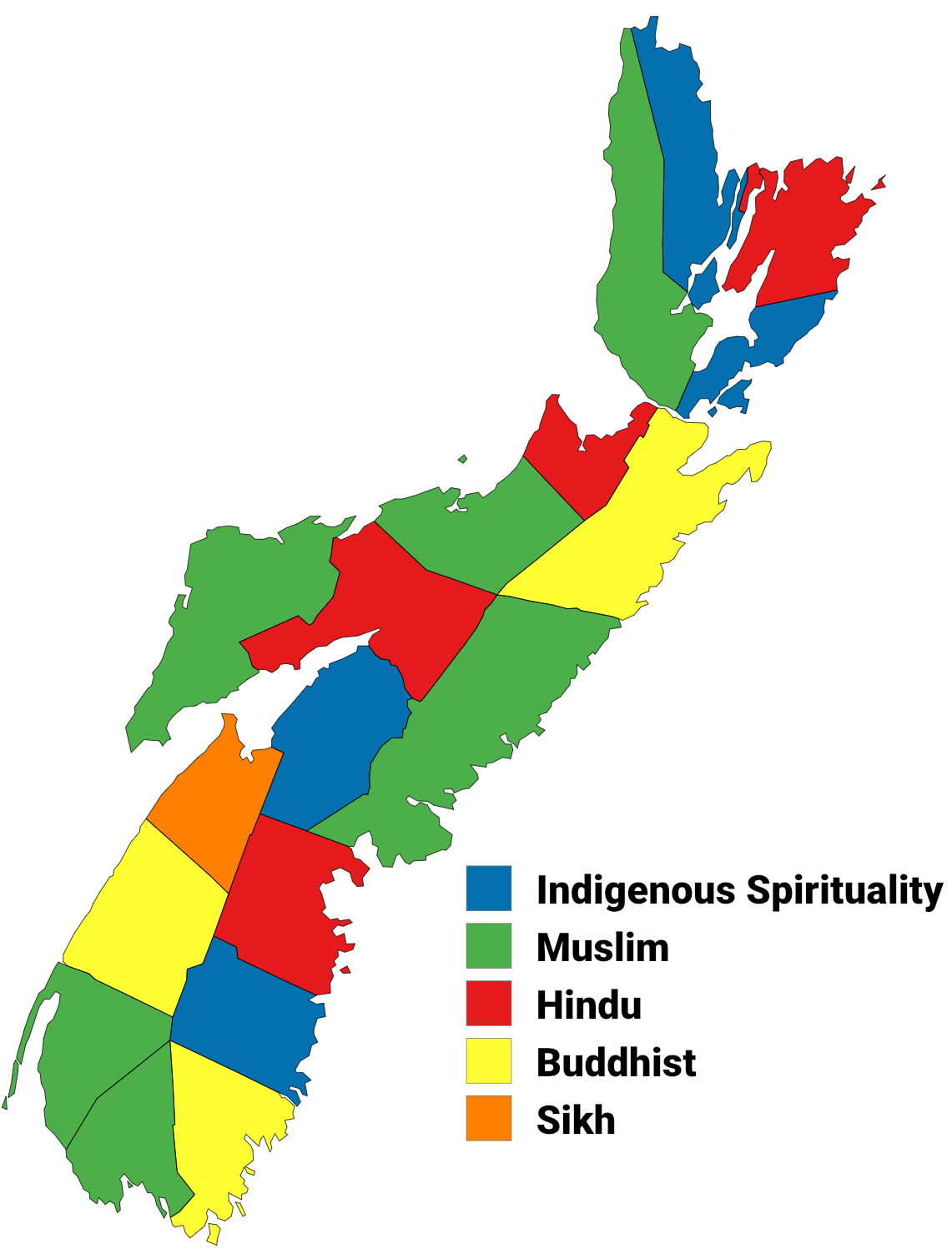
Largest non-Christian religion in Nova Scotia by census division, 2021 census

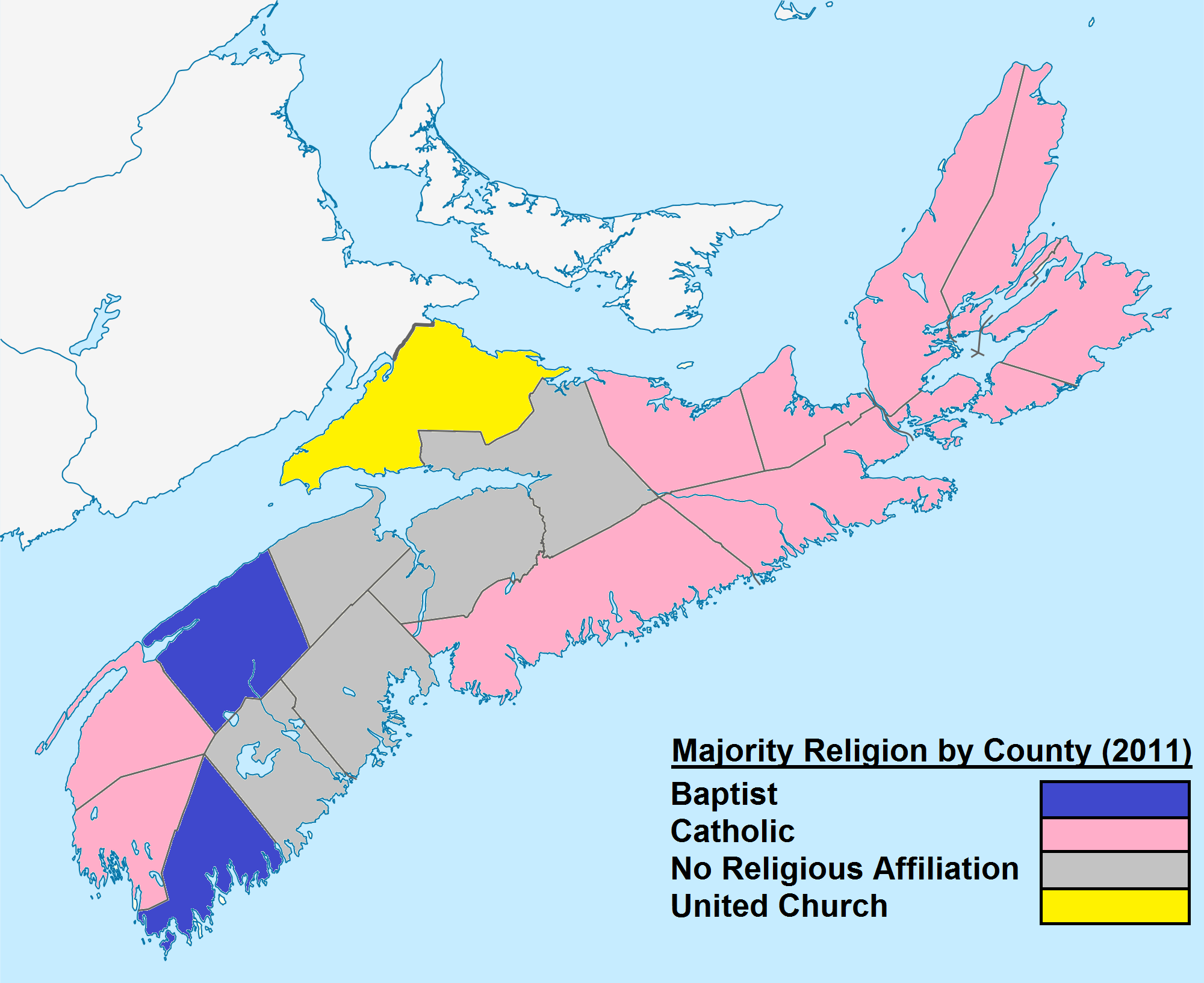
Majority religion in Nova Scotia by county, 2011 census

== Migration ==
=== Immigration ===
Nova Scotia immigration statistics (1861–2021)
Census year	Immigrant percentage	Immigrant population	Total responses	Total population	Source(s)
1861 Census of Nova Scotia	10.93%	36,151	330,857	330,857	
1871 Canadian census	8.37%	32,456	387,800	387,800	
1881 Canadian census	6.29%	27,713	440,572	440,572	
1891 Canadian census	5.84%	26,315	450,396	450,396	
1901 Canadian census	5.31%	24,402	459,574	459,574	
1911 Canadian census	7.39%	36,375	492,338	492,338	
1921 Canadian census	8.31%	43,505	523,837	523,837	
1931 Canadian census	8.15%	41,797	512,846	512,846	
1941 Canadian census	7.05%	40,741	577,962	577,962	
1951 Canadian census	4.46%	28,680	642,584	642,584	
1961 Canadian census	4.64%	34,168	737,007	737,007	
1971 Canadian census	4.71%	37,190	788,960	788,960	
1981 Canadian census	4.97%	41,715	839,800	847,442	
1986 Canadian census	4.68%	40,465	864,150	873,176	
1991 Canadian census	4.39%	39,110	890,950	899,942	
1996 Canadian census	4.66%	41,955	899,970	909,282	
2001 Canadian census	4.6%	41,315	897,570	908,007	
2006 Canadian census	5%	45,190	903,090	913,462	
2011 Canadian census	5.33%	48,275	906,175	921,727	
2016 Canadian census	6.13%	55,680	908,340	923,598	
2021 Canadian census	7.49%	71,570	955,855	969,383	

The 2021 census reported that immigrants (individuals born outside Canada) comprise 71,570 persons or 7.5 percent of the total population of Nova Scotia.

Immigrants in Nova Scotia by country of birth
Country of birth	2021 census		2016 census		2011 census		2006 census		2001 census		1996 census		1991 census		1986 census		1981 census		1971 census		1961 census		1951 census		1941 census		1931 census	
Country of birth	Pop.	%	Pop.	%	Pop.	%	Pop.	%	Pop.	%	Pop.	%	Pop.	%	Pop.	%	Pop.	%	Pop.	%	Pop.	%	Pop.	%	Pop.	%	Pop.	%
United Kingdom	11,930	16.7%	11,270	20.2%	11,000	22.8%	11,660	25.8%	10,800	26.1%	12,210	29.1%	12,045	30.8%	13,445	33.2%	14,190	34%	13,965	37.6%	14,429	42.2%	13,180	46%	12,316	30.2%	13,552	32.4%
United States	7,570	10.6%	7,375	13.2%	8,275	17.1%	7,960	17.6%	8,065	19.5%	8,815	21%	9,485	24.3%	9,905	24.5%	11,335	27.2%	8,780	23.6%	7,389	21.6%	7,555	26.3%	8,633	21.2%	7,222	17.3%
India	5,605	7.8%	2,225	4%	1,415	2.9%	1,440	3.2%	1,140	2.8%	1,370	3.3%	1,190	3%	1,175	2.9%	1,140	2.7%	890	2.4%	119	0.3%	86	0.3%	66	0.2%	80	0.2%
Philippines	4,755	6.6%	2,575	4.6%	1,325	2.7%	420	0.9%	495	1.2%	460	1.1%	245	0.6%	235	0.6%	245	0.6%	—N/a	—N/a	—N/a	—N/a	—N/a	—N/a	—N/a	—N/a	—N/a	—N/a
China & Taiwan	4,500 (Note: China: 4,320 / Taiwan: 180)	6.3%	3,055 (Note: China: 2,830 / Taiwan: 225)	5.5%	2,145 (Note: China: 1,710 / Taiwan: 435)	4.4%	1,830 (Note: China: 1,740 / Taiwan: 90)	4%	1,150 (Note: China: 1,025 / Taiwan: 125)	2.8%	910 (Note: China: 870 / Taiwan: 40)	2.2%	620 (Note: China: 585 / Taiwan: 35)	1.6%	560 (Note: China: 510 / Taiwan: 50)	1.4%	520 (Note: China: 240 / Taiwan: 280)	1.2%	510	1.4%	358	1%	331	1.2%	286	0.7%	297	0.7%
Syria & Lebanon	3,985 (Note: Syria: 2,420 / Lebanon: 1,565)	5.6%	2,520 (Note: Syria: 1,150 / Lebanon: 1,370)	4.5%	1,780 (Note: Syria: 185 / Lebanon: 1,595)	3.7%	1,400 (Note: Syria: 135 / Lebanon: 1,265)	3.1%	1,640 (Note: Syria: 180 / Lebanon: 1,460)	4%	1,305 (Note: Syria: 50 / Lebanon: 1,255)	3.1%	1,125 (Note: Syria: 65 / Lebanon: 1,060)	2.9%	975 (Note: Syria: 50 / Lebanon: 925)	2.4%	995	2.4%	—N/a	—N/a	—N/a	—N/a	—N/a	—N/a	336	0.8%	365	0.9%
Germany & Austria	2,485 (Note: Germany: 2,375 / Austria: 110)	3.5%	2,745 (Note: Germany: 2,600 / Austria: 145)	4.9%	2,530 (Note: Germany: 2,385 / Austria: 145)	5.2%	2,995 (Note: Germany: 2,850 / Austria: 145)	6.6%	2,660 (Note: Germany: 2,455 / Austria: 205)	6.4%	2,505 (Note: Germany: 2,375 / Austria: 130)	6%	1,880 (Note: Germany: 1,740 / Austria: 140)	4.8%	2,275 (Note: Germany: 2,160 / Austria: 115)	5.6%	2,745 (Note: Germany: 2,630 / Austria: 115)	6.6%	2,950	7.9%	1,771	5.2%	453	1.6%	514	1.3%	635	1.5%
Nigeria & Ghana	1,935 (Note: Nigeria: 1,745 / Ghana: 190)	2.7%	525 (Note: Nigeria: 350 / Ghana: 175)	0.9%	365 (Note: Nigeria: 215 / Ghana: 150)	0.8%	255 (Note: Nigeria: 165 / Ghana: 90)	0.6%	165 (Note: Nigeria: 105 / Ghana: 60)	0.4%	165 (Note: Nigeria: 105 / Ghana: 60)	0.4%	145	0.4%	115	0.3%	80	0.2%	—N/a	—N/a	—N/a	—N/a	—N/a	—N/a	—N/a	—N/a	—N/a	—N/a
Netherlands	1,465	2%	1,645	3%	1,530	3.2%	1,830	4%	1,975	4.8%	2,070	4.9%	2,000	5.1%	2,105	5.2%	1,945	4.7%	1,910	5.1%	2,222	6.5%	607	2.1%	95	0.2%	29	0.1%
Russia & Ukraine	1,320 (Note: Russia: 705 / Ukraine: 615)	1.8%	930 (Note: Russia: 590 / Ukraine: 340)	1.7%	725 (Note: Russia: 485 / Ukraine: 240)	1.5%	385 (Note: Russia: 225 / Ukraine: 160)	0.9%	310 (Note: Russia: 215 / Ukraine: 95)	0.8%	365 (Note: Includes total persons born in all republics of the Soviet Union.)	0.9%	240	0.6%	230	0.6%	345	0.8%	495	1.3%	762	2.2%	901	3.1%	831	2%	852	2%
South Korea	1,220	1.7%	865	1.6%	570	1.2%	425	0.9%	310	0.8%	180	0.4%	95	0.2%	20	0%	20	0%	—N/a	—N/a	—N/a	—N/a	—N/a	—N/a	—N/a	—N/a	—N/a	—N/a
Jamaica & Trinidad and Tobago	1,045 (Note: Jamaica: 760 / Trinidad and Tobago: 285)	1.5%	705 (Note: Jamaica: 485 / Trinidad and Tobago: 220)	1.3%	390 (Note: Jamaica: 185 / Trinidad and Tobago: 205)	0.8%	410 (Note: Jamaica: 170 / Trinidad and Tobago: 240)	0.9%	375 (Note: Jamaica: 155 / Trinidad and Tobago: 220)	0.9%	415 (Note: Jamaica: 190 / Trinidad and Tobago: 225)	1%	505 (Note: Jamaica: 230 / Trinidad and Tobago: 275)	1.3%	535 (Note: Jamaica: 250 / Trinidad and Tobago: 285)	1.3%	465	1.1%	335	0.9%	401 (Note: All individuals born in the British West Indies.)	1.2%	444	1.5%	500	1.2%	564	1.3%
Iran	1,040	1.5%	970	1.7%	910	1.9%	400	0.9%	220	0.5%	185	0.4%	220	0.6%	180	0.4%	50	0.1%	—N/a	—N/a	—N/a	—N/a	—N/a	—N/a	—N/a	—N/a	—N/a	—N/a
Egypt	970	1.4%	765	1.4%	570	1.2%	670	1.5%	260	0.6%	405	1%	175	0.4%	105	0.3%	75	0.2%	—N/a	—N/a	—N/a	—N/a	—N/a	—N/a	—N/a	—N/a	—N/a	—N/a
Former Yugoslavia	950	1.3%	730	1.3%	430	0.9%	670	1.5%	635	1.5%	640	1.5%	215	0.5%	210	0.5%	150	0.4%	160	0.4%	195	0.6%	111	0.4%	134	0.3%	245	0.6%
Pakistan	900	1.3%	615	1.1%	345	0.7%	450	1%	235	0.6%	390	0.9%	150	0.4%	135	0.3%	160	0.4%	85	0.2%	—N/a	—N/a	—N/a	—N/a	—N/a	—N/a	—N/a	—N/a
Poland	765	1.1%	625	1.1%	575	1.2%	970	2.1%	730	1.8%	655	1.6%	960	2.5%	700	1.7%	550	1.3%	665	1.8%	834	2.4%	930	3.2%	1,054	2.6%	1,262	3%
South Africa	710	1%	460	0.8%	310	0.6%	320	0.7%	160	0.4%	225	0.5%	225	0.6%	185	0.5%	120	0.3%	—N/a	—N/a	58	0.2%	26	0.1%	50	0.1%	37	0.1%
France & Belgium	680 (Note: France: 485 / Belgium: 195)	1%	720 (Note: France: 610 / Belgium: 110)	1.3%	545 (Note: France: 395 / Belgium: 150)	1.1%	710 (Note: France: 530 / Belgium: 180)	1.6%	620 (Note: France: 485 / Belgium: 135)	1.5%	585 (Note: France: 410 / Belgium: 175)	1.4%	525 (Note: France: 345 / Belgium: 180)	1.3%	660 (Note: France: 430 / Belgium: 230)	1.6%	700 (Note: France: 495 / Belgium: 205)	1.7%	815	2.2%	860	2.5%	635	2.2%	752	1.8%	951	2.3%
Vietnam	675	0.9%	450	0.8%	450	0.9%	375	0.8%	535	1.3%	515	1.2%	510	1.3%	495	1.2%	480	1.2%	—N/a	—N/a	—N/a	—N/a	—N/a	—N/a	—N/a	—N/a	—N/a	—N/a
Israel & Palestine	625	0.9%	505	0.9%	280	0.6%	155	0.3%	225	0.5%	145	0.3%	25	0.1%	80	0.2%	55	0.1%	—N/a	—N/a	—N/a	—N/a	—N/a	—N/a	—N/a	—N/a	—N/a	—N/a
Australia & New Zealand	590	0.8%	430	0.8%	410	0.8%	440	1%	345	0.8%	320	0.8%	210	0.5%	245	0.6%	215	0.5%	255	0.7%	132	0.4%	86	0.3%	108	0.3%	82	0.2%
Ireland	555	0.8%	475	0.9%	635	1.3%	425	0.9%	375	0.9%	350	0.8%	480	1.2%	375	0.9%	185	0.4%	335	0.9%	1,006	2.9%	796	2.8%	880	2.2%	990	2.4%
Kenya & Tanzania & Uganda	555 (Note: Kenya: 355 / Tanzania: 60 / Uganda: 140)	0.8%	285 (Note: Kenya: 125 / Tanzania: 50 / Uganda: 110)	0.5%	260 (Note: Kenya: 125 / Tanzania: 75 / Uganda: 60)	0.5%	245 (Note: Kenya: 110 / Tanzania: 75 / Uganda: 60)	0.5%	190 (Note: Kenya: 125 / Tanzania: 20 / Uganda: 45)	0.5%	165 (Note: Kenya: 65 / Tanzania: 40 / Uganda: 60)	0.4%	145 (Note: Kenya: 60 / Tanzania: 30 / Uganda: 55)	0.4%	80 (Note: Kenya: 20 / Tanzania: 30 / Uganda: 30)	0.2%	160	0.4%	—N/a	—N/a	—N/a	—N/a	—N/a	—N/a	—N/a	—N/a	—N/a	—N/a
Kuwait	545	0.8%	615	1.1%	695	1.4%	780	1.7%	770	1.9%	535	1.3%	—N/a	—N/a	—N/a	—N/a	—N/a	—N/a	—N/a	—N/a	—N/a	—N/a	—N/a	—N/a	—N/a	—N/a	—N/a	—N/a
Bangladesh	540	0.8%	315	0.6%	335	0.7%	135	0.3%	10	0%	15	0%	0	0%	5	0%	10	0%	—N/a	—N/a	—N/a	—N/a	—N/a	—N/a	—N/a	—N/a	—N/a	—N/a
Saudi Arabia	500	0.7%	370	0.7%	335	0.7%	255	0.6%	230	0.6%	90	0.2%	—N/a	—N/a	—N/a	—N/a	—N/a	—N/a	—N/a	—N/a	—N/a	—N/a	—N/a	—N/a	—N/a	—N/a	—N/a	—N/a
Italy	490	0.7%	525	0.9%	480	1%	540	1.2%	575	1.4%	560	1.3%	670	1.7%	715	1.8%	725	1.7%	900	2.4%	830	2.4%	466	1.6%	606	1.5%	742	1.8%
Scandinavia (Note: Includes Denmark, Finland, Iceland, Norway and Sweden.)	440	0.6%	495	0.9%	470	1%	460	1%	560	1.4%	555	1.3%	485	1.2%	535	1.3%	590	1.4%	780	2.1%	698	2%	617	2.2%	687	1.7%	690	1.7%
Brazil	440	0.6%	175	0.3%	65	0.1%	25	0.1%	80	0.2%	45	0.1%	30	0.1%	15	0%	45	0.1%	—N/a	—N/a	—N/a	—N/a	—N/a	—N/a	—N/a	—N/a	—N/a	—N/a
Iraq	440	0.6%	525	0.9%	455	0.9%	250	0.6%	240	0.6%	140	0.3%	55	0.1%	10	0%	10	0%	—N/a	—N/a	—N/a	—N/a	—N/a	—N/a	—N/a	—N/a	—N/a	—N/a
Ethiopia & Eritrea	400 (Note: Ethiopia: 275 / Eritrea: 125)	0.6%	320 (Note: Ethiopia: 190 / Eritrea: 130)	0.6%	205 (Note: Ethiopia: 170 / Eritrea: 35)	0.4%	140 (Note: Ethiopia: 125 / Eritrea: 15)	0.3%	100 (Note: Ethiopia: 90 / Eritrea: 10)	0.2%	155	0.4%	30	0.1%	45	0.1%	—N/a	—N/a	—N/a	—N/a	—N/a	—N/a	—N/a	—N/a	—N/a	—N/a	—N/a	—N/a
Jordan	385	0.5%	395	0.7%	285	0.6%	170	0.4%	100	0.2%	35	0.1%	—N/a	—N/a	—N/a	—N/a	—N/a	—N/a	—N/a	—N/a	—N/a	—N/a	—N/a	—N/a	—N/a	—N/a	—N/a	—N/a
Sri Lanka	375	0.5%	310	0.6%	190	0.4%	95	0.2%	205	0.5%	200	0.5%	95	0.2%	45	0.1%	30	0.1%	—N/a	—N/a	—N/a	—N/a	—N/a	—N/a	—N/a	—N/a	—N/a	—N/a
Mexico	355	0.5%	330	0.6%	185	0.4%	185	0.4%	75	0.2%	95	0.2%	75	0.2%	65	0.2%	15	0%	—N/a	—N/a	—N/a	—N/a	—N/a	—N/a	—N/a	—N/a	—N/a	—N/a
Hong Kong	350	0.5%	280	0.5%	290	0.6%	280	0.6%	470	1.1%	540	1.3%	345	0.9%	165	0.4%	265	0.6%	—N/a	—N/a	—N/a	—N/a	—N/a	—N/a	—N/a	—N/a	—N/a	—N/a
DR Congo & Cameroon	345 (Note: DR Congo: 265 / Cameroon: 80)	0.5%	180 (Note: DR Congo: 150 / Cameroon: 30)	0.3%	105 (Note: DR Congo: 50 / Cameroon: 55)	0.2%	40 (Note: DR Congo: 30 / Cameroon: 10)	0.1%	25 (Note: DR Congo: 25 / Cameroon: 0)	0.1%	15 (Note: DR Congo: 15 / Cameroon: 0)	0%	30	0.1%	10	0%	0	0%	—N/a	—N/a	—N/a	—N/a	—N/a	—N/a	—N/a	—N/a	—N/a	—N/a
United Arab Emirates	330	0.5%	265	0.5%	195	0.4%	105	0.2%	205	0.5%	65	0.2%	—N/a	—N/a	—N/a	—N/a	—N/a	—N/a	—N/a	—N/a	—N/a	—N/a	—N/a	—N/a	—N/a	—N/a	—N/a	—N/a
Turkey	320	0.4%	270	0.5%	170	0.4%	85	0.2%	110	0.3%	90	0.2%	105	0.3%	175	0.4%	50	0.1%	—N/a	—N/a	—N/a	—N/a	—N/a	—N/a	8	0%	4	0%
Sudan & South Sudan	315	0.4%	130	0.2%	90	0.2%	65	0.1%	70	0.2%	0	0%	5	0%	0	0%	0	0%	—N/a	—N/a	—N/a	—N/a	—N/a	—N/a	—N/a	—N/a	—N/a	—N/a
Romania	310	0.4%	180	0.3%	190	0.4%	130	0.3%	135	0.3%	85	0.2%	70	0.2%	40	0.1%	45	0.1%	30	0.1%	61	0.2%	57	0.2%	106	0.3%	174	0.4%
Greece	300	0.4%	510	0.9%	355	0.7%	550	1.2%	635	1.5%	545	1.3%	580	1.5%	560	1.4%	745	1.8%	550	1.5%	411	1.2%	129	0.4%	108	0.3%	96	0.2%
Japan	300	0.4%	225	0.4%	135	0.3%	185	0.4%	50	0.1%	115	0.3%	30	0.1%	30	0.1%	45	0.1%	45	0.1%	15	0%	7	0%	13	0%	6	0%
Switzerland	290	0.4%	210	0.4%	215	0.4%	215	0.5%	130	0.3%	145	0.3%	60	0.2%	120	0.3%	70	0.2%	55	0.1%	46	0.1%	32	0.1%	35	0.1%	23	0.1%
Colombia	270	0.4%	175	0.3%	290	0.6%	115	0.3%	10	0%	0	0%	15	0%	5	0%	—N/a	—N/a	—N/a	—N/a	—N/a	—N/a	—N/a	—N/a	—N/a	—N/a	—N/a	—N/a
Guyana	255	0.4%	170	0.3%	170	0.4%	125	0.3%	150	0.4%	100	0.2%	55	0.1%	130	0.3%	65	0.2%	—N/a	—N/a	—N/a	—N/a	—N/a	—N/a	—N/a	—N/a	—N/a	—N/a
Czech Republic & Slovakia	250	0.3%	210	0.4%	135	0.3%	250	0.6%	245	0.6%	215	0.5%	185	0.5%	240	0.6%	240	0.6%	285	0.8%	231	0.7%	227	0.8%	272	0.7%	373	0.9%
Portugal	235	0.3%	220	0.4%	120	0.2%	220	0.5%	215	0.5%	215	0.5%	270	0.7%	310	0.8%	245	0.6%	110	0.3%	—N/a	—N/a	—N/a	—N/a	—N/a	—N/a	—N/a	—N/a
El Salvador & Guatemala & Nicaragua	215 (Note: El Salvador: 85 / Guatemala: 100 / Nicaragua: 30)	0.3%	175 (Note: El Salvador: 95 / Guatemala: 45 / Nicaragua: 35)	0.3%	80 (Note: El Salvador: 45 / Guatemala: 35 / Nicaragua: 0)	0.2%	55 (Note: El Salvador: 35 / Guatemala: 10 / Nicaragua: 10)	0.1%	65 (Note: El Salvador: 25 / Guatemala: 30 / Nicaragua: 10)	0.2%	105 (Note: El Salvador: 70 / Guatemala: 20 / Nicaragua: 15)	0.3%	260 (Note: El Salvador: 165 / Guatemala: 85 / Nicaragua: 10)	0.7%	15 (Note: El Salvador: 0 / Guatemala: 0 / Nicaragua: 15)	0%	20	0%	—N/a	—N/a	—N/a	—N/a	—N/a	—N/a	—N/a	—N/a	—N/a	—N/a
Hungary	215	0.3%	110	0.2%	185	0.4%	230	0.5%	210	0.5%	185	0.4%	260	0.7%	235	0.6%	285	0.7%	260	0.7%	351	1%	201	0.7%	302	0.7%	421	1%
Total immigrants	71,570	7.5%	55,680	6.1%	48,275	5.3%	45,190	5%	41,315	4.6%	41,955	4.7%	39,110	4.4%	40,465	4.7%	41,715	5%	37,190	4.7%	34,168	4.6%	28,680	4.5%	40,741	7%	41,797	8.2%
Total responses	955,855	98.6%	908,340	98.3%	906,175	98.3%	903,090	98.9%	897,570	98.9%	899,970	99%	890,950	99%	864,150	99%	839,800	99.1%	788,960	100%	737,007	100%	642,584	100%	577,962	100%	512,846	100%
Total population	969,383	100%	923,598	100%	921,727	100%	913,462	100%	908,007	100%	909,282	100%	899,942	100%	873,176	100%	847,442	100%	788,960	100%	737,007	100%	642,584	100%	577,962	100%	512,846	100%

=== Recent immigration ===
The 2021 Canadian census counted a total of 21,385 people who immigrated to Nova Scotia between 2016 and 2021.

Recent immigrants to Nova Scotia by Country of birth (2016 to 2021)
Country of Birth	Population	% recent immigrants
India	3,665	17.1%
Philippines	2,325	10.9%
Syria	2,140	10%
China	2,045	9.6%
Nigeria	1,445	6.8%
United States	880	4.1%
United Kingdom	730	3.4%
South Korea	580	2.7%
Pakistan	375	1.8%
Egypt	375	1.8%
Bangladesh	350	1.6%
Jamaica	325	1.5%
Ukraine	265	1.2%
Brazil	260	1.2%
South Africa	225	1.1%
Saudi Arabia	225	1.1%
Iran	220	1%
Russia	205	1%
Vietnam	205	1%
Germany	185	0.9%
Israel	180	0.8%
Jordan	175	0.8%
Lebanon	175	0.8%
Sudan	160	0.7%
Democratic Republic of the Congo	160	0.7%
Total recent immigrants	21,385	100%

=== Interprovincial migration ===
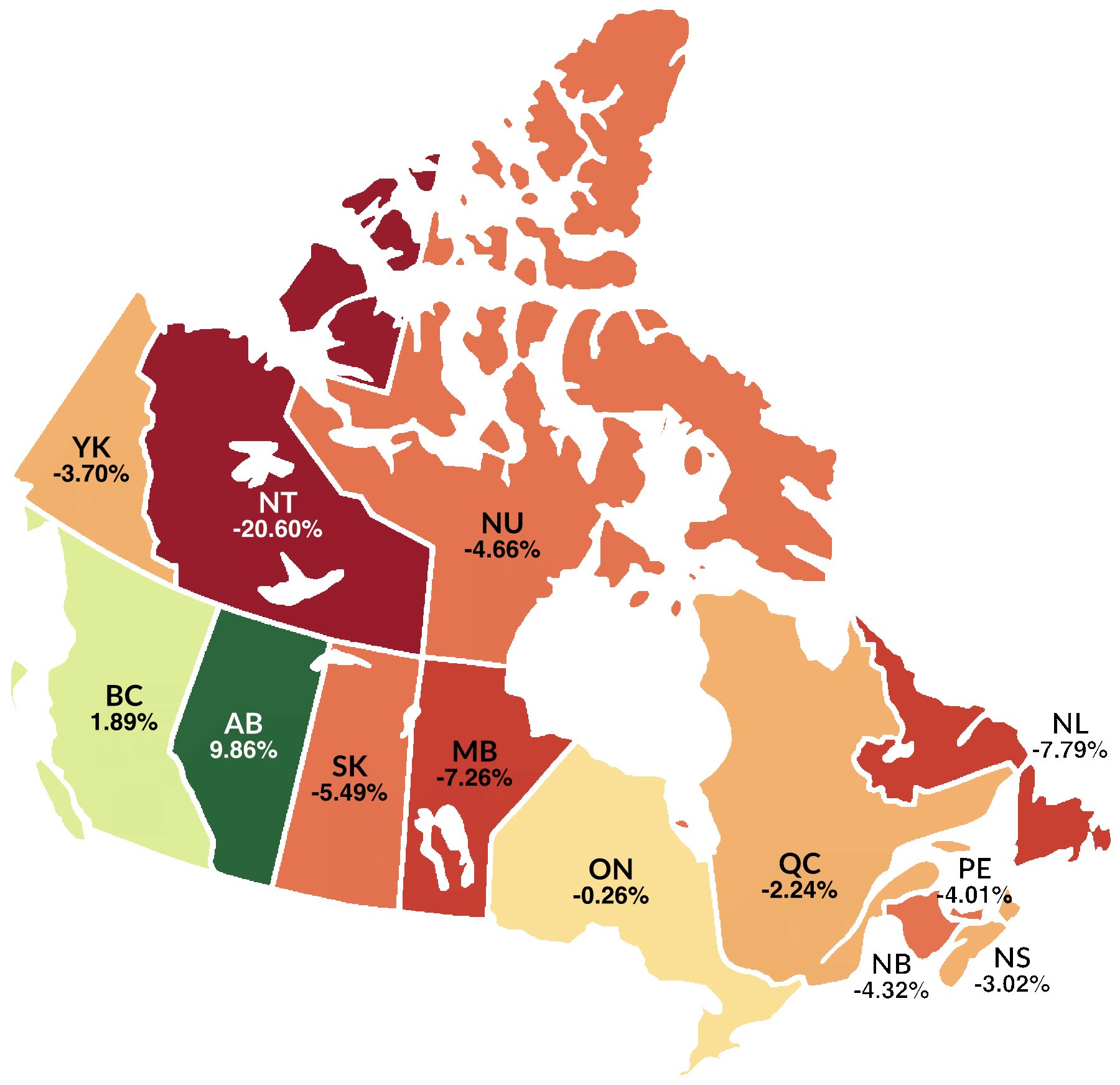
Net cumulative interprovincial migration per Province from 1997 to 2017, as a share of population of each Provinces

From 1971 to 2011, Nova Scotia had a persistent negative trend in net interprovincial migration. Combined with a declining birth rate, this posed a significant demographic challenge for the province, as its population was projected to decline. The destination for Nova Scotia migrants was most often Ontario, until the turn of the 21st century when Alberta became a more popular destination; New Brunswick ranks as a distant third.

Interprovincial migration in Nova Scotia
	In-migrants	Out-migrants	Net migration
2008–09	15,467	16,218	−751
2009–10	15,172	14,560	612
2010–11	14,553	14,594	−41
2011–12	14,410	17,276	−2,866
2012–13	12,630	16,147	−3,517
2013–14	13,402	15,973	−2,571
2014–15	13,854	16,165	−2,311
2015–16	15,107	14,353	754
2016–17	15,339	12,500	2,839
2017–18	15,509	12,461	3,048
2018–19	17,324	14,018	3,306

Source: Statistics Canada

== Employment ==
As of February 2019, the unemployment rate for the province is 6.4 percent. Halifax Regional Municipality 4.9 percent

== Income ==
Median household income
By county

Rank	County	2011
1	Halifax County	$62,049
2	Hants County	$60,186
3	Antigonish County	$57,577
	Nova Scotia	$53,606
4	Inverness County	$53,194
5	Kings County	$51,850
6	Richmond County	$50,745
7	Colchester County	$50,568
8	Pictou County	$50,417
9	Lunenburg County	$48,154
10	Yarmouth County	$47,676
11	Victoria County	$47,413
12	Cape Breton County	$47,224
13	Queens County	$45,050
14	Shelburne County	$44,267
15	Cumberland County	$43,385
16	Annapolis County	$43,522
17	Digby County	$42,293
18	Guysborough County	$42,063

By community

Rank	Community	2011
1	Halifax Regional Municipality	$62,069
2	Port Hawkesbury	$61,013
	Nova Scotia	$53,606
3	Stewiacke	$52,118
4	Mahone Bay	$49,158
5	Wolfville	$48,671
6	Hantsport	$48,584
7	Clark's Harbour	$48,102
8	Cape Breton Regional Municipality	$47,830
9	Stellarton	$46,307
10	Antigonish	$45,538
11	Kentville	$45,098
12	New Glasgow	$44,942
13	Westville	$44,647
14	Middleton	$44,048
15	Annapolis Royal	$43,956
16	Trenton	$42,535
17	Pictou	$41,905 (Note: 2011 Census data unavailable, data taken from the 2006 Census.)
18	Truro	$41,878
19	Windsor	$41,859
20	Amherst	$41,027
21	Bridgewater	$40,049
22	Berwick	$39,674
23	Lunenburg	$39,529
24	Bridgetown	$38,248
25	Oxford	$37,734
26	Springhill	$36,995
27	Mulgrave	$36,200
28	Canso	$35,574
29	Shelburne	$35,526
30	Yarmouth	$34,572
31	Lockeport	$33,854
32	Digby	$33,437
33	Parrsboro	$27,472

== See also ==
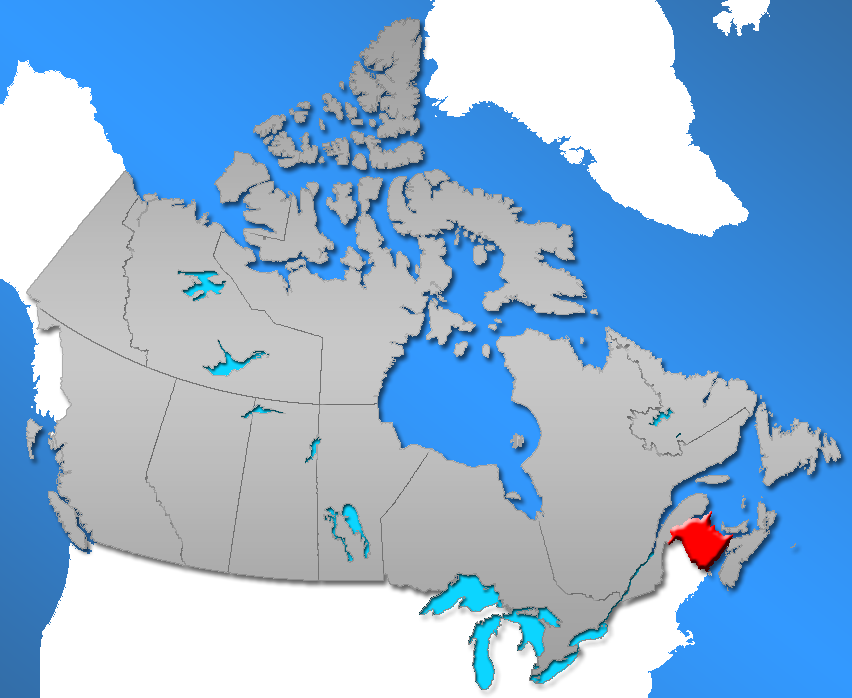
Demographics of Canada's provinces and territories
- Demographics of Canada
- Population of Canada by province and territory
