= Clark's Harbour =

- Town
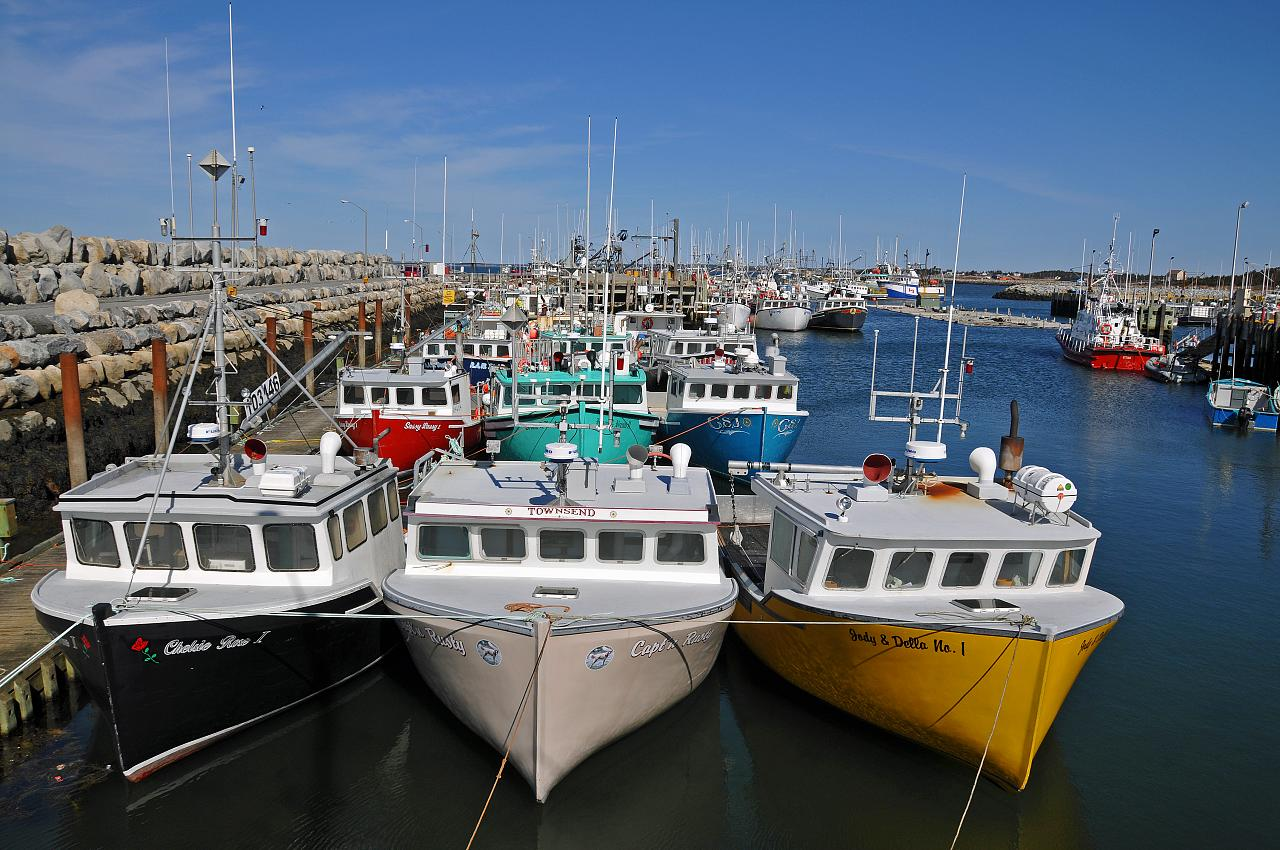

- Seal
- Motto: Unity with Independence
- Location of Clark's Harbour, Nova Scotia
- Coordinates: 43.4425°N 65.628889°W
- Country: Canada
- Province: Nova Scotia
- County: Shelburne
- Founded: 1773
- Incorporated: March 4, 1919

Government
  - Type: Town Council
  - Mayor: Clay Kenney

Area (2021)
  - Land: 2.82 km^{2} (1.09 sq mi)
- Elevation: 2 m (6.6 ft)

Population (2021)
  - Total: 725
  - Density: 257.3/km^{2} (666/sq mi)
  - Change (2016-21): ▼4.4%
  - Dwellings: 399
- Time zone: UTC-4 (AST)
  - Summer (DST): UTC-3 (ADT)
- Postal code(s): B0W 1P0
- Area code: 902 (745)
- Access Routes: Route 330
- Website: clarksharbour.com

Clark's Harbour is a town on Cape Sable Island in southwestern Nova Scotia, Canada, located in Shelburne County. The main industry is lobster fishing. Owing to this as well as the town's history as a fishing community, the town is noted as the birthplace of the Cape Islander fishing boat.

The community is the southernmost town in the province of Nova Scotia, and thus one of the southernmost towns in Canada, being located roughly on a parallel with Bilbao, Basque Country and just north of Rome.

== Demographics ==
Historical population
Year	Pop.	±%
1941	887	—
1951	1,020	+15.0%
1981	1,059	+3.8%
1986	1,098	+3.7%
1991	1,076	−2.0%
1996	980	−8.9%
2001	944	−3.7%
2006	860	−8.9%
2011	820	−4.7%
2016	758	−7.6%
2021	725	−4.4%

In the 2021 Census of Population conducted by Statistics Canada, Clark's Harbour had a population of 725 living in 362 of its 399 total private dwellings, a change of −4.4% from its 2016 population of 758. With a land area of 2.82 km^{2} (1.09 sq mi), it had a population density of 257.1/km^{2} (665.9/sq mi) in 2021.

Mother tongue language (2006)

Language	Population	Pct (%)
English	855	98.84%
French	10	1.16%

Ethnic Origins (2006)
Ethnic Origin	Population	Pct (%)
Canadian	500	67.1%
English	260	34.9%
Scottish	140	18.8%
Métis	80	10.7%
French	80	10.7%
Irish	60	8.1%
German	55	7.4%

Religious make-up (2001)

Religion	Population	Pct (%)
Protestant	815	85.79%
Catholic	80	8.42%
No religious affiliation	55	5.79%

Income (2006)

Income type	By CAD
Per capita income	$18,326
Median Household Income	$35,830
Median Family Income	$49,977

== Climate ==
Clark's Harbour has an oceanic climate (Köppen climate classification Cfb) with milder winters than the mainland. Summer temperatures are very low for the latitude (the same latitude as Toulouse), and the climate borders the subpolar oceanic (Köppen Cfc) type. The strong influence of the Atlantic ocean also produces significant seasonal lag, with September having the warmest year-round lows, as well as having warmer weather in the daytime compared to July.

Climate data for Cape Sable Island (1948-1986)
Month	Jan	Feb	Mar	Apr	May	Jun	Jul	Aug	Sep	Oct	Nov	Dec	Year
Record high °C (°F)	12.0 (53.6)	12.0 (53.6)	14.0 (57.2)	16.0 (60.8)	18.9 (66.0)	22.8 (73.0)	24.0 (75.2)	24.0 (75.2)	23.9 (75.0)	22.0 (71.6)	17.2 (63.0)	13.9 (57.0)	24.0 (75.2)
Mean daily maximum °C (°F)	1.4 (34.5)	0.7 (33.3)	3.0 (37.4)	5.7 (42.3)	8.8 (47.8)	12.0 (53.6)	13.8 (56.8)	14.9 (58.8)	15.1 (59.2)	12.3 (54.1)	8.7 (47.7)	4.6 (40.3)	8.4 (47.1)
Daily mean °C (°F)	−1.6 (29.1)	−2.1 (28.2)	0.6 (33.1)	3.6 (38.5)	6.8 (44.2)	9.7 (49.5)	11.3 (52.3)	12.4 (54.3)	12.7 (54.9)	10.0 (50.0)	6.2 (43.2)	1.4 (34.5)	5.9 (42.6)
Mean daily minimum °C (°F)	−4.8 (23.4)	−5.0 (23.0)	−1.9 (28.6)	1.4 (34.5)	4.6 (40.3)	7.3 (45.1)	8.7 (47.7)	9.9 (49.8)	10.3 (50.5)	7.6 (45.7)	3.6 (38.5)	−1.8 (28.8)	3.3 (37.9)
Record low °C (°F)	−17.2 (1.0)	−18.3 (−0.9)	−14.5 (5.9)	−6.7 (19.9)	−1.1 (30.0)	2.8 (37.0)	5.0 (41.0)	5.6 (42.1)	0.6 (33.1)	−3.0 (26.6)	−7.8 (18.0)	−19.0 (−2.2)	−19.0 (−2.2)
Average precipitation mm (inches)	140.4 (5.53)	112.7 (4.44)	104.8 (4.13)	98.7 (3.89)	86.4 (3.40)	76.2 (3.00)	68.3 (2.69)	104.6 (4.12)	73.4 (2.89)	89.8 (3.54)	122.2 (4.81)	139.6 (5.50)	1,217.1 (47.92)
Average rainfall mm (inches)	86.5 (3.41)	71.5 (2.81)	83.5 (3.29)	94.6 (3.72)	86.1 (3.39)	76.2 (3.00)	68.3 (2.69)	104.6 (4.12)	73.4 (2.89)	89.1 (3.51)	120.8 (4.76)	113.3 (4.46)	1,067.9 (42.04)
Average snowfall cm (inches)	53.9 (21.2)	41.2 (16.2)	21.2 (8.3)	4.2 (1.7)	0.3 (0.1)	0 (0)	0 (0)	0 (0)	0 (0)	0.7 (0.3)	1.3 (0.5)	26.3 (10.4)	149.0 (58.7)
Average precipitation days (≥ 0.2 mm)	17	13	12	11	10	10	9	9	8	10	13	16	138
Average rainy days (≥ 0.2 mm)	8	6	9	10	10	10	9	9	8	10	13	11	112
Average snowy days (≥ 0.2 cm)	11	8	5	1	0	0	0	0	0	0	0	6	32
Source: Environment Canada

== Economy ==
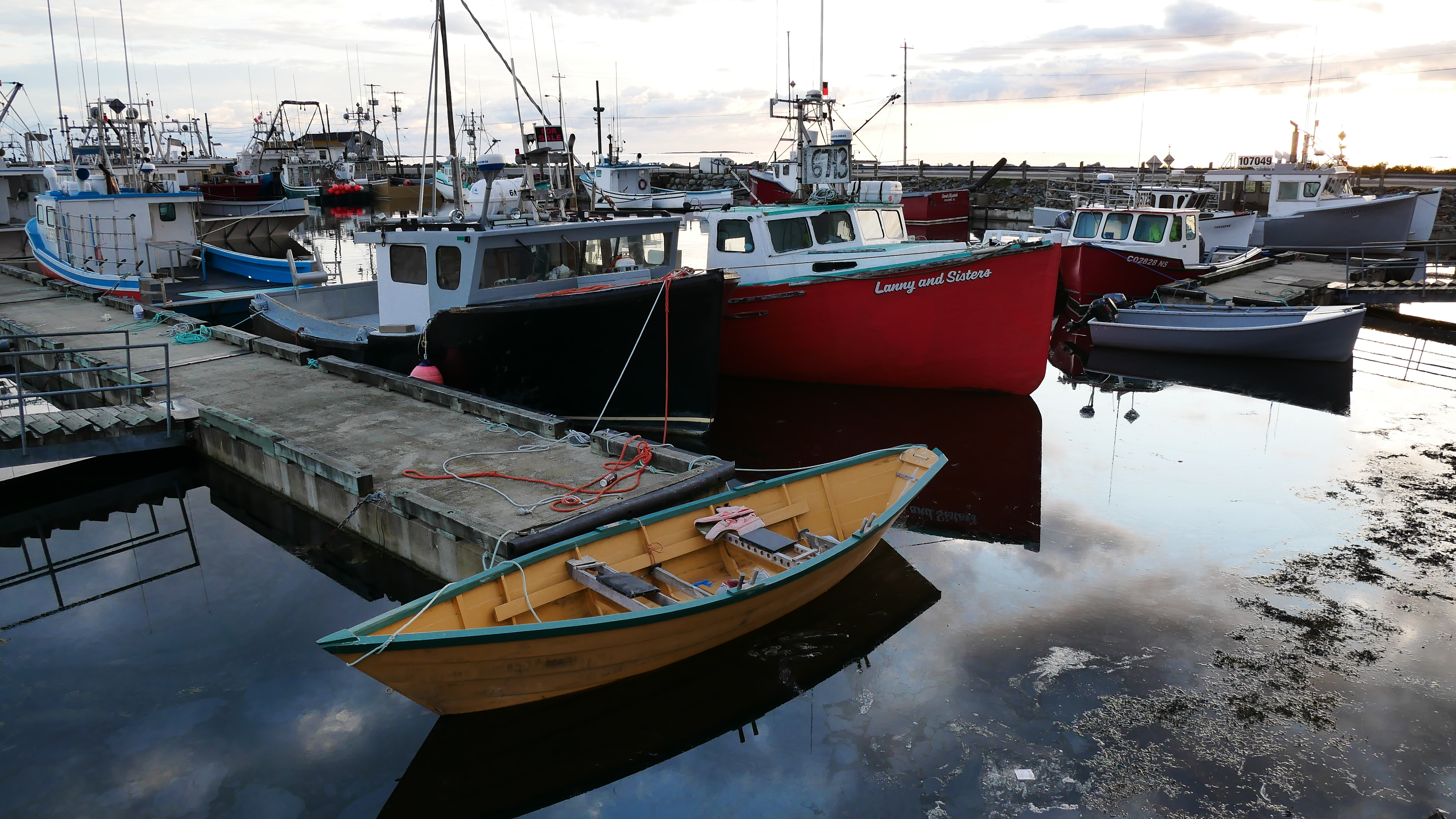
Cape Islanders and a traditional dory

The economy of Clark's Harbour and its surrounding areas is driven largely by the fishing industry and in particular the seasonal lobster fishery. Shelburne County (in which Clark's Harbour is located) is generally accepted as the lobster capital of Nova Scotia (and a nearby sign boasts the claim that it is the Lobster Capital of Canada). The fishery has also given rise to various secondary and tertiary industries such as further seafood processing and packaging, and boatbuilding. Lobster that is trapped by Clark's Harbour fishers is exported around the world, but primarily to the New England market. Traps used in the area are built locally.

There are several other employers in Clark's Harbour, including a general store, a service station, a pizza parlour, and a takeout restaurant. However, the economic impact of these businesses is generally small compared to the fishery.

== Public library ==
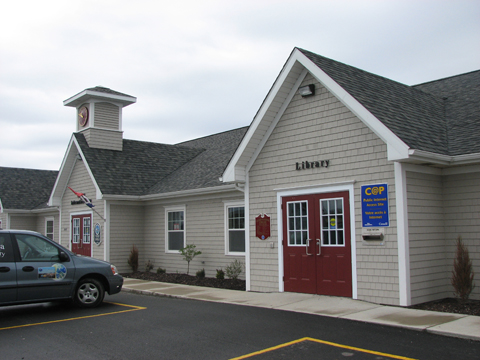
Clark's Harbour Branch Library

Located at 2648 Main Street in Clark's Harbour, the Clark's Harbour Branch Library is one of the 10 branches of Western Counties Regional Library. It joined the Western Counties Regional Library in July 1971 but it did not have a physical location in Clark's Harbour until the first branch opened on March 4, 1974 . The branch was relocated to its present site as part of the Clark's Harbour Civic Centre on December 11, 2007.

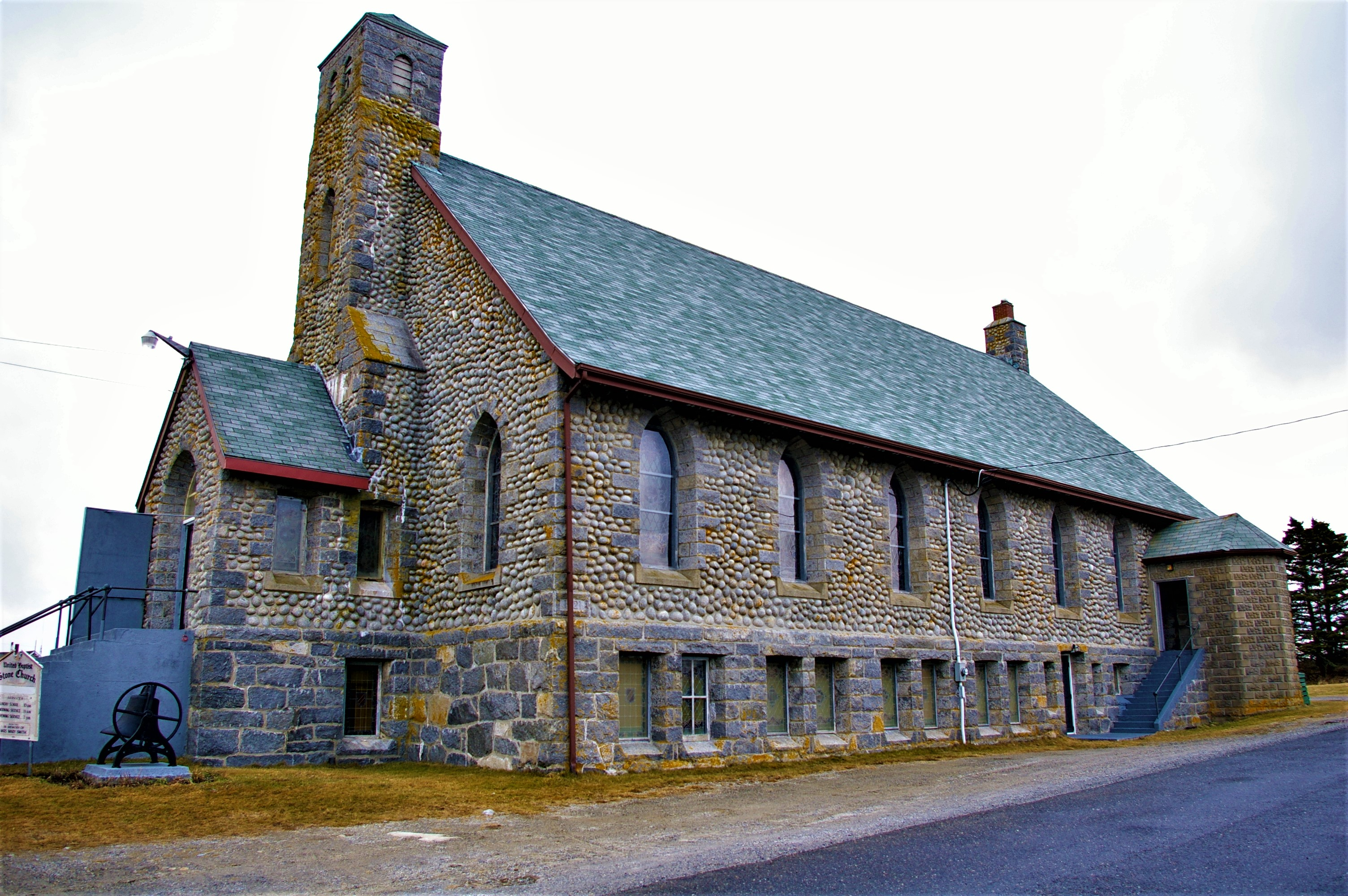

== Stone Church ==
One of the more notable attractions in Clark's Harbour is the United Baptist Stone Church, which is a popular destination for visitors. It is noted primarily for its unique architecture,

The Stone Church was first started on September 5, 1921, by Lieutenant-Governor MacCallum Grant. The foundation is made of native granite, and three feet in thickness. The granite that was used was all cut by hand using chisels. The walls are made of cobblestones gathered from the shore and surrounding islands. This church is eighty-five feet by fifty-five feet and has a seating capacity of five hundred. The inside of the church is decorated in rich wood, and the windows are stained glass.

Thomas Doucette was given the task of constructing the Stone Church from blueprints. The blueprints were designed by a Halifax architect named S.P. Dumaresq. Doucette began building the church, even though he could not read or write and had the blueprints read to him only once. It took ten years to complete the erection of the church.

== See also ==
- List of municipalities in Nova Scotia
