= Outline of Nova Scotia =

Overview of and topical guide to Nova Scotia

Flag of Nova Scotia

Coat of arms of Nova Scotia

Location of Nova Scotia

The following outline is provided as an overview of and topical guide to Nova Scotia:

Nova Scotia – meaning New Scotland in Latin, is the second-smallest province in Canada. It is one of Canada's three Maritime provinces, with its mainland territory consisting of the Nova Scotia peninsula surrounded by the Atlantic Ocean, in addition to over 3,800 coastal islands, the largest one being Cape Breton Island.

== General reference ==
- Pronunciation: /ˌnoʊvə ˈskoʊʃə/; French: Nouvelle-Écosse; Scottish Gaelic: Alba Nuadh
- Common English name(s): Nova Scotia
- Official English name: Nova Scotia
- Common endonym(s):
- Official endonym(s): Nova Scotia, French: Nouvelle-Écosse
- Adjectival(s): Nova Scotian
- Demonym(s): Nova Scotian, Bluenose, Bluenoser
- Bibliography of Nova Scotia

== Geography of Nova Scotia ==
Geography of Nova Scotia

- Nova Scotia is: a Maritime Province of Canada
- Location:
  - The regions that Nova Scotia is in are:
    - Northern Hemisphere, Western Hemisphere
      - Americas
        - North America
          - Northern America
            - Canada
              - Eastern Canada
                - Atlantic Canada
                  - The Maritimes
  - Extreme points of Nova Scotia
    - Highest point of Nova Scotia: White Hill
- Population of Nova Scotia: 921,727 (2011 census)
- Area of Nova Scotia: 55,283 km^{2}
- Atlas of Nova Scotia
- Toponymy of Nova Scotia

=== Environment of Nova Scotia ===
- Geology of Nova Scotia
- Protected areas of Nova Scotia
  - World Heritage Sites of Nova Scotia:
    - Joggins Fossil Cliffs
    - Grand-Pré National Historic Site
    - Old Town Lunenburg
  - Historic places in Nova Scotia
    - National Historic Sites of Canada in Nova Scotia

==== Natural geographic features of Nova Scotia ====
- Bodies of water
  - Adjacent bodies of water
    - Atlantic Ocean
      - Bay of Fundy
      - Northumberland Strait
      - Strait of Canso
  - Interior bodies of water
    - Lakes of Nova Scotia
      - Lakes named Rocky Lake in Nova Scotia
    - Rivers of Nova Scotia
      - Waterfalls of Nova Scotia
- Islands of Nova Scotia
  - Cape Breton Island
  - Brier Island
  - Sable Island
- Mountains of Nova Scotia
  - Mountain ranges of Nova Scotia
    - Cape Breton Highlands
    - Cobequid Mountains
- Annapolis Valley
- Musquodoboit Valley
- Shubenacadie Valley
- Stewiacke Valley
- Wentworth Valley

=== Regions of Nova Scotia ===
- Mainland Halifax
  - Isthmus of Chignecto
    - Tantramar
  - Nova Scotia peninsula
    - Annapolis Valley
    - Central Nova Scotia
    - Eastern Shore
    - Halifax Regional Municipality
    - Musquodoboit Valley
    - North Shore (Nova Scotia)
    - Southern Nova Scotia
- Cape Breton Island
  - Industrial Cape Breton
  - Cape Breton Regional Municipality (CBRM)
  - Cape Breton Highlands
  - Strait of Canso Area

==== Administrative divisions of Nova Scotia ====
- Capital of Nova Scotia: Halifax Regional Municipality
- Population centres in Nova Scotia
- Health regions of Nova Scotia
- Counties of Nova Scotia
- School districts in Nova Scotia

===== Counties of Nova Scotia =====
Nova Scotia has 18 counties, 3 of which are regional municipalities.

- Annapolis
- Antigonish
- Cape Breton
- Colchester
- Cumberland
- Digby
- Guysborough
- Halifax
- Hants
- Inverness
- Kings
- Lunenburg
- Pictou
- Queens
- Richmond
- Shelburne
- Victoria
- Yarmouth

===== Regional municipalities of Nova Scotia =====
Nova Scotia has 3 regional municipalities.

Regional municipalities

- Cape Breton
- Halifax – Capital of Nova Scotia
- Queens

====== Halifax Regional Municipality ======
Halifax Regional Municipality – Capital of Nova Scotia

- Geography of the Halifax Regional Municipality
  - Halifax Harbour
  - Municipal Districts
  - Communities in the Halifax Regional Municipality
    - Bedford
    - Chebucto Peninsula
    - Cole Harbour & Westphal
    - Cow Bay & Eastern Passage
    - Dartmouth
    - Eastern Shore East
    - Eastern Shore West
    - Hammonds Plains, Upper Sackville & Beaver Bank
    - Lake Echo & Porters Lake
    - Lawrencetown
    - Musquodoboit Valley & Dutch Settlement
    - Preston & Cherrybrook
    - Prospect
    - St. Margaret's Bay
    - Timberlea, Lakeside, Beechville
- Government and politics of Halifax
  - Regional Council
  - Community Councils
  - Halifax elections
    - 2004 election
    - 2008 election
    - 2012 election
  - Law of Halifax
    - Law enforcement in Halifax
      - Halifax Regional Police
- History of the Halifax Regional Municipality
  - Halifax Explosion
- Culture of the Halifax Regional Municipality
  - Architecture of Halifax
    - Buildings and infrastructure
  - People from Halifax
  - Sports in the Halifax Regional Municipality
  - Economy and infrastructure of the Halifax Regional Municipality
    - Communications in Halifax
      - Media in the Halifax Regional Municipality
      - Halifax Public Libraries
    - Halifax Regional Fire and Emergency
    - Transportation in the Halifax Regional Municipality
      - Metro Transit
      - Halifax Port Authority
        - Halifax Harbour Solutions
      - Royal Nova Scotia Yacht Squadron
    - Water supply and sanitation in Halifax
      - Halifax Regional Water Commission
  - Education in the Halifax Regional Municipality
    - Halifax Regional School Board

===== Municipal districts of Nova Scotia =====
Municipal districts

- Argyle
- Barrington
- Chester
- Clare
- Digby
- East Hants
- Guysborough
- Lunenburg
- Shelburne
- St. Mary's
- West Hants
- Yarmouth

===== Towns of Nova Scotia =====
- Amherst
- Annapolis Royal
- Antigonish
- Berwick
- Bridgetown
- Bridgewater
- Clark's Harbour
- Digby
- Hantsport
- Kentville
- Lockeport
- Lunenburg
- Mahone Bay
- Middleton
- Mulgrave
- New Glasgow
- Oxford
- Parrsboro
- Pictou
- Port Hawkesbury
- Shelburne
- Springhill
- Stellarton
- Stewiacke
- Trenton
- Truro
- Westville
- Windsor
- Wolfville
- Yarmouth

===== Incorporated villages =====
- Aylesford
- Baddeck
- Bible Hill
- Canning
- Chester
- Cornwallis Square
- Dover
- Freeport
- Greenwood
- Havre Boucher
- Hebbville
- Kingston
- Lawrencetown
- New Minas
- Port Williams
- Pugwash
- River Hebert
- St. Peter's
- Tatamagouche
- Tiverton
- Westport
- Weymouth

===== Communities of Nova Scotia, by county =====
Communities in Nova Scotia

- Lists of communities by county
  - List of communities in Annapolis County, Nova Scotia
  - List of communities in Antigonish County, Nova Scotia
  - List of communities in Digby County, Nova Scotia
  - List of communities in Guysborough County, Nova Scotia
  - List of communities in Hants County, Nova Scotia
  - List of communities in Inverness County, Nova Scotia
  - List of communities in Kings County, Nova Scotia
  - List of communities in Lunenburg County, Nova Scotia
  - List of communities in Pictou County, Nova Scotia
  - List of communities in Region of Queens Municipality, Nova Scotia
  - List of communities in Richmond County, Nova Scotia
  - List of communities in Shelburne County, Nova Scotia
  - List of communities in Victoria County, Nova Scotia
- Designated places in Nova Scotia
- List of towns in Nova Scotia
- List of villages in Nova Scotia
- Indian reserves in Nova Scotia

=== Demographics of Nova Scotia ===
Demographics of Nova Scotia

- Population centres in Nova Scotia

== Government and politics of Nova Scotia ==
- Form of government: Constitutional monarchy
- Capital of Nova Scotia: Halifax Regional Municipality
- Elections in Nova Scotia
  - Canadian federal election results in Nova Scotia
- Political issues in Nova Scotia
  - NIMBY in Nova Scotia
- Political parties in Nova Scotia
  - The three main political parties are:
    - Progressive Conservative Party of Nova Scotia
    - Nova Scotia Liberal Party
    - Nova Scotia New Democratic Party
- Political scandals of Nova Scotia
- Taxation in Canada

=== Federal representation ===
- Senators

=== Provincial government of Nova Scotia ===
==== Executive branch ====
- Head of state: King in Right of Nova Scotia, King of Canada, King Charles III
  - Head of state's representative (Viceroy): Lieutenant Governor of Nova Scotia
    - List of lieutenant governors of Nova Scotia
- Head of government: Premier of Nova Scotia
  - List of premiers of Nova Scotia
  - Deputy Premier of Nova Scotia
  - Cabinet: Executive Council of Nova Scotia
    - Head of council: Lieutenant-Governor-in-Council, as representative of the King in Right of Nova Scotia

==== Legislative branch ====
- Parliament of Nova Scotia (unicameral, which nonetheless has 2 components):
  - King-in-Parliament (King of Canada), represented in his absence by the Lieutenant-Governor of Nova Scotia
  - Nova Scotia House of Assembly
    - List of Nova Scotia General Assemblies
    - Speaker of the House of Assembly of Nova Scotia
    - List of Nova Scotia opposition leaders

==== Judicial branch ====
Court system of Nova Scotia

- Nova Scotia Court of Appeal (NSCA)
  - Nova Scotia Supreme Court
    - Provincial Court of Nova Scotia

=== Law and order in Nova Scotia ===
- Constitution of Canada
  - Constitution Act, 1867 – sets the powers and structure of the provinces of Canada, including Nova Scotia
- Criminal justice system of Nova Scotia
  - Criminal Code of Canada
- Human rights in Nova Scotia
  - Domestic partnership in Nova Scotia
  - Same-sex marriage in Nova Scotia

==== Law enforcement in Nova Scotia ====
- Provincial Court of Nova Scotia
- Halifax Regional Police

=== Military in Nova Scotia ===
- CFB Halifax
- CFB Greenwood
- Shearwater Heliport

== History of Nova Scotia ==
=== History of Nova Scotia, by period ===
- Part of Mi'kmaq semi-nomadic tribal lands (Mi'kmaq'ki) (centuries prior-1604)
- Part of Acadia (1604-1710) – still considered "Mi'kmaq'ki" by the Mi'kmaq, who allowed French settlement in their midst
  - Habitation at Port-Royal (1605-1613)
- Scottish Colony "Nova Scotia" 1629-1632
- Part of Acadia again (1632-1710)
  - Port-Royal (relocated) (1632-1710)
  - Acadian Civil War (1640-1644)
  - Wabanaki Confederacy (1675–present)
  - Siege of Port Royal (Conquest of Acadia, 1710)
  - Treaty of Utrecht (1713) – France ceded Nova Scotia to Great Britain
  - Father Rale's War (1722–1725)
  - Acadian Exodus (1749)
  - Father Le Loutre's War (1749–1755)
  - Expulsion of the Acadians (1755–1764)
  - Burying the Hatchet ceremony (1761)
  - Treaty of Paris (1763) – France ceded New France, including Nova Scotia/Acadia to Great Britain
- Canadian Confederation (1867) – Dominion of Canada formed, establishing provinces of Ontario, Quebec, Nova Scotia, and New Brunswick

=== History of Nova Scotia, by region ===
- History of the Halifax Regional Municipality
  - Amalgamation of the Halifax Regional Municipality
  - Halifax (former city)
    - Halifax Explosion
- History of Victoria

=== History of Nova Scotia, by subject ===
- Historic places in Nova Scotia
  - Ghost towns in Nova Scotia
- Maritime history of Nova Scotia
  - Bluenose
    - Bluenose II
    - Bluenose IV
  - Maritime Sign Language

==== Military history of Nova Scotia ====
- Battle of Port Royal (1690)
- Conquest of Acadia (1710)
- Battle of Jeddore Harbour (1722)
- Northeast Coast Campaign (1745)
- Battle of Grand Pré (1747)
- Dartmouth Massacre (1751)
- Bay of Fundy Campaign (1755)
- Fall of Louisbourg (1758)
- Headquarters established for Royal Navy's North American Station (1758)
- Burying the Hatchet ceremony (1761)
- Battle of Fort Cumberland (1776)
- Raid on Lunenburg (1782)
- Halifax Impressment Riot (1805)
- Establishment of New Ireland (1812)
- Capture of USS Chesapeake (1813)
- Battle at the Great Redan (1855)
- Siege of Lucknow (1857)
- CSS Tallahassee Escape (1861)
- Departing Halifax for Northwest Rebellion (1885)
- Departing Halifax for the Boer War (1899)
- Imprisonment of Leon Trotsky (1917)
- Jewish Legion formed (1917)
- Battle of the St. Lawrence (1942–44
- Sinking of the SS Point Pleasant Park (1945)
- Halifax VE-Day Riot (1945)
- Walter Callow Wheelchair Bus established (1947)

== Culture of Nova Scotia ==
- Architecture of Nova Scotia
  - Heritage Trust of Nova Scotia
  - Province House
- Cuisine of Nova Scotia
  - Nova Scotia wine
- Language in Nova Scotia
  - Canadian English dialect
  - Acadian French dialect
  - Cape Breton accent
  - Mi'kmaq language
  - Language policies of Nova Scotia
- Museums of Nova Scotia
- Order of Nova Scotia
- People of Nova Scotia
  - Nova Scotians
  - Ethnic minorities in Nova Scotia
    - Acadians
    - Indigenous peoples
      - Mi'kmaq people
    - Black Nova Scotians
  - Nobility in Nova Scotia
    - Baronetcies in the Baronetage of Nova Scotia
- Public holidays in Nova Scotia
  - Treaty Day
  - Nova Scotia Heritage Day
- Religion in Nova Scotia
  - Christianity in Nova Scotia
    - Anglicanism in Nova Scotia
      - Diocese of Nova Scotia and Prince Edward Island
- Symbols of Nova Scotia
  - Coat of arms of Nova Scotia
  - Flag of Nova Scotia
- Scouting and Guiding in Nova Scotia

=== Heritage sites in Nova Scotia ===
- Historic places in Nova Scotia
- World Heritage Sites of Nova Scotia:
  - Joggins Fossil Cliffs
  - Grand-Pré National Historic Site
  - Old Town Lunenburg
- National Historic Sites of Canada in Nova Scotia

=== The Arts in Nova Scotia ===
- Art Gallery of Nova Scotia
- Literature of Nova Scotia
  - First Death in Nova Scotia
- List of writers from Nova Scotia
- Music of Nova Scotia

=== Sports in Nova Scotia ===
- List of curling clubs in Nova Scotia
- List of ice hockey teams in Nova Scotia
- Nova Scotia Rugby Union

== Economy and infrastructure of Nova Scotia ==
- Economic rank (by nominal GDP):
- Banking in Nova Scotia
  - Banks and credit unions in Canada
- Communications in Nova Scotia
  - Radio stations in Nova Scotia
  - Television stations in Nova Scotia
  - Postage stamps and postal history of Nova Scotia
- Currency of Nova Scotia
- Energy in Nova Scotia
  - List of electrical generating stations in Nova Scotia
- Mining in Nova Scotia
  - Mines in Nova Scotia
  - Gold mining in Nova Scotia
  - Uranium mining in Nova Scotia
- Petroleum pricing in Nova Scotia
- Transportation in Nova Scotia
  - Air transport in Nova Scotia
    - Airlines in Nova Scotia
    - Airports in Nova Scotia
  - Roads in Nova Scotia
    - Provincial highways of Nova Scotia
  - Vehicle registration plates of Nova Scotia

== Education in Nova Scotia ==
- Primary education in Nova Scotia
  - List of school districts in Nova Scotia
    - List of schools in Nova Scotia
- Higher education in Nova Scotia
  - Alliance of Nova Scotia Student Associations
  - Colleges in Nova Scotia
  - Universities in Nova Scotia
    - Technical University of Nova Scotia

== See also ==
- Outline of geography
  - Outline of Canada
    - Outline of Alberta
    - Outline of British Columbia
    - Outline of Manitoba
    - Outline of New Brunswick
    - Outline of Newfoundland and Labrador
    - Outline of Ontario
    - Outline of Prince Edward Island
    - Outline of Quebec
    - Outline of Saskatchewan
