= Administrative divisions of Nova Scotia =

Local governance within Nova Scotia

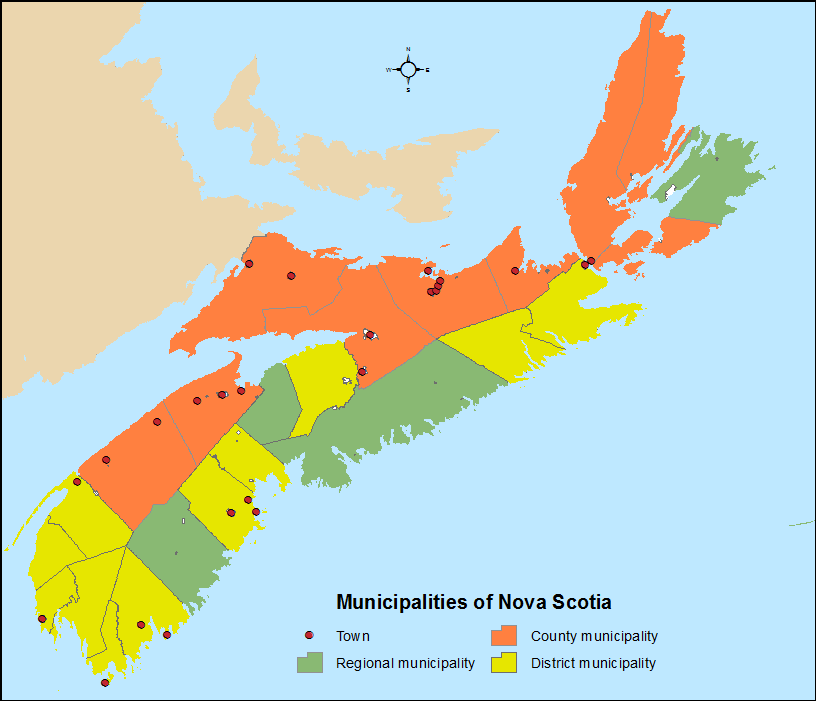
Distribution of Nova Scotia's 49 municipalities by municipal status type; villages are not shown as they are subdivisions of county or district municipalities

The Canadian province of Nova Scotia is divided into 49 municipalities, of which there are three types: regional (4), town (25), and county or district municipality (20).

A municipality's purposes is to provide services such as drinking water, planning, recreation, and fire protection.

Demographics have been a catalyst of change, with population growth occurring only in Halifax and Hants, and the viability of depopulated areas threatened. Since 1995 about 15 municipalities have been dissolved and their territory merged with larger municipalities.

The Constitution of Canada gives provinces exclusive jurisdiction over municipalities and in Nova Scotia these are defined by the Municipal Government Act.

Areas outside of standard municipal jurisdiction include Canadian Armed Forces military bases, Indian reserves, national parks, provincial parks, and national wildlife areas.

== Regional municipalities ==
Governed by an elected council, one councillor being elected for each district, and an at-large mayor. There are four: Cape Breton, Halifax, Queens, and West Hants. Regional municipalities are incorporated via the merger of existing municipalities. In 1992 the provincial government decided to reduce the number of municipalities in the province and forced amalgamations.

== Rural municipalities ==
County and district municipalities are often described collectively as rural municipalities. Governed by an elected council, one councillor being elected for each district, one of whom is selected by the councillors to take a leading role as warden. A county municipality typically covers the area of its eponymous historical county, minus any incorporated towns while a district municipality may be based on a former subdivision of a county.

The county municipalities are: Antigonish, Colchester, Cumberland, Inverness, Kings, Pictou, Richmond, and Victoria.

The district municipalities are: Argyle, Barrington, Chester, Clare, Digby, East Hants, Guysborough, Lunenburg, Shelburne, St. Mary's, and Yarmouth.

=== Villages ===
Villages exist within some rural municipalities to provide additional services and governance in built-up areas. These elect commissioners (but not a warden or mayor), and can levy property taxes, and spend money on some local services. A village provides municipal services to a defined area within a larger county or district municipality.

Nova Scotia has 21 villages: Aylesford, Baddeck, Bible Hill, Canning, Chester, Cornwallis Square, Dover, Freeport, Greenwood, Hebbville, Kingston, Lawrencetown, New Minas, Port Williams, Pugwash, River Hebert, St. Peter's, Tatamagouche, Tiverton, Westport, and Weymouth

== Towns ==
A town is an incorporated area governed by an elected council, one councillor being elected for each district, and an at-large mayor.

Nova Scotia has 26 towns: Amherst, Annapolis Royal, Antigonish, Berwick, Bridgewater, Clark's Harbour, Digby, Kentville, Lockeport, Lunenburg, Mahone Bay, Middleton, Mulgrave, New Glasgow, Oxford, Pictou, Port Hawkesbury, Shelburne, Stellarton, Stewiacke, Trenton, Truro, Westville, and Wolfville.

== Other divisions of the province ==
=== Census areas ===
Census Canada divides the province into census divisions and subdivisions, population centres, and economic regions (Cape Breton, North Shore, Annapolis Valley, Southern, and Halifax).

=== Health authorities ===
The Nova Scotia Health Authority divides the province into four areas:

- Annapolis Valley, South Shore and South West Nova Scotia
- Cape Breton, Guysborough and Antigonish
- Colchester-East Hants, Cumberland and Pictou
- Halifax, Eastern Shore and West Hants

=== Protected areas ===
- National Parks of Canada and provincial parks
- Canadian Heritage Rivers System: the Shelburne and the Margaree, and provincial protected beaches
- National Wildlife Areas and National Migratory Bird Sanctuaries administered by the Canadian Wildlife Service; and provincial nature reserves, game sanctuaries, nature reserves, and wildlife management areas
- Provincial Wilderness Areas regulated by the Wilderness Areas Protection Act under the responsibility of Nova Scotia Environment and are areas where resource extraction, development, use of vehicles and similar activities are prohibited. Hunting, trapping and fishing are permitted.

=== Indian reserves ===
There are 39 Indian reserves in Nova Scotia.

=== Canadian Forces bases ===
There are 11 Canadian Forces bases in Nova Scotia.

=== Historical counties ===
In 1759 the Nova Scotia peninsula is divided into counties. Though no longer relevant politically, many of their borders continue to be used as census divisions, and their names continue as the names of county and district municipalities derived from them. In 1879 the County Incorporation Act created 24 rural municipalities run by elected councils. Timeline:

- 1759: the Nova Scotia peninsula was divided into five counties: Annapolis, Cumberland, Halifax, Kings, and Lunenburg.
- 1765: the colonies of Cape Breton and Nova Scotia were merged, and Cape Breton County was added.
- 1762-1836: Queens, Shelburne, and Yarmouth separated from Lunenburg.
- 1781: Hants separated from Kings.
- 1835-1863: Colchester, Pictou, Guysborough, and Antigonish separated from Halifax.
- 1835-1851: Inverness Richmond, and Victoria separated from Cape Breton.
- 1837: Digby separated from Annapolis.
- 1841: the first elected local government is established in Halifax.
- 1879: local government was established and the 18 counties lost their administrative function.

== See also ==
- Nova Scotia lists: communities, designated places, counties, municipalities, population centres, protected areas, towns, villages
