= Ecofeminism in Canada =

Ecofeminism generally is based on the understanding that gender as a concept is the basis of the human-environment relationships. Studies suggest that there is a difference between men and women when it comes to how they treat nature, for instance, women are known to be more involved with environmentally friendly behaviors. Socially there is an important claim in the ecofeminism theoretical framework that the patriarchy is linked to discrimination against women and the degradation of the environment. In Canada the United Nations Special Rapporteur on Human Rights and Toxics in 2020 shows that ineffective environmental management and mismanagement of hazardous waste is affecting different age groups, genders, and socioeconomic status in different ways, while three years before that, Canadian Human Rights Commission in 2017 submitted another report, warning the government about how the exposure to environmental hazards is a different experience for minorities in Canada. There have been ecofeminist movements for decades all over Canada such as Mother's Milk Project, protests against Uranium mining in Nova Scotia, and the Clayoquot Sound Peace Camp. Ecofeminism has also appeared as a concept in the media, such as books, publications, movies, and documentaries such as the MaddAddam trilogy by Margaret Atwood and Fury for the Sound: the women at Clayoquot by Shelley Wine. Ecofeminism in the Canadian context has been subject to criticism, especially by the Indigenous communities as they call it cultural appropriation, non-inclusive, and inherent in colonial worldviews and structures.

== Categories ==
In the Canadian context, two main categories can be recognized. One is by spiritual ecofeminists who are mainly drawing upon the concept of Mother Earth to explain the relationship between women and nature. Another category is social ecofeminism which relies on the colonial experience of Indigenous groups to pull apart the gendered concept of nature-culture as they believe that these concepts and differentiations are the cause of environmental sexism. Spiritual ecofeminists believe that the link between women and nature should be celebrated and they believe that it can turn into a post patriarchal governance model in which both body and nature are respected and celebrated. This is criticized as being problematic since they believe that conceptualizing women as life givers will only feed the patriarchal hierarchies

== Movements ==
In Canada, Indigenous communities are faced with environmental devastation. The communities are not equipped legally or economically to resist the establishment of polluting companies proximate to their homes. They are more at risk of illnesses and among them, women and children are more vulnerable as the pollution and environmental injustices affect people of different genders differently.

=== Mother's Milk project ===
In the case of the Aamjiwnaang community in Ontario, which is located in close proximity to 62 industrial facilities, the hospital admission of women is at least twice as high as men in Ontario, which called for more attention to the correlation between gender and minorities and environmental degradation. This drew attention to the higher levels of PCB toxins in the water near the reserves, which have caused the Mohawk children to be exposed to 200% more toxins than children off-reserve.

Katsi Cook, a Mohawk grandmother and midwife, decided to take action regarding this issue and lead a movement toward environmental and reproduction justice. This environmental activist believes that as women give and support life during pregnancy, their bodies should be protected, as nature should be. In the case of the Akwesasne Mother's Milk Project, having a partnership with researchers and publishing more than 50 papers helped raise awareness about the issue. These movements should continue as local data is needed to assess the situation and levels of contaminants more closely as it also helps with data and information collection regarding traditional and cultural land use and Indigenous resource management practices.

=== Uranium mining ban in Nova Scotia ===
When uranium mining in Nova Scotia was a subject of debate in the early 1980s, women played an important role in resisting mining in the province. They were drawn to this issue due to the immediate threat of uranium mining to children's health, and through women's environmental, peace, and feminist organizations throughout the province.

In the 1970s, when different global companies were exploring Nova Scotia for uranium, the people of Nova Scotia formed opposition groups. Among these groups, the Women's Institute of Hants County, Nova Scotia, played an important role to raise awareness about the dangers of uranium mining. Members of this group went so far as to publish a novel about their struggles and the movement to stop nuclear mining in Nova Scotia. Donna Smyth, the author of the novel is still known for her antinuclear activism and is mentioned by different sources as an example of activism by women in Canada. This movement has been so effective that there has been a moratorium on uranium mining in Nova Scotia ever since.

=== Clayoquot Sound Peace Camp ===
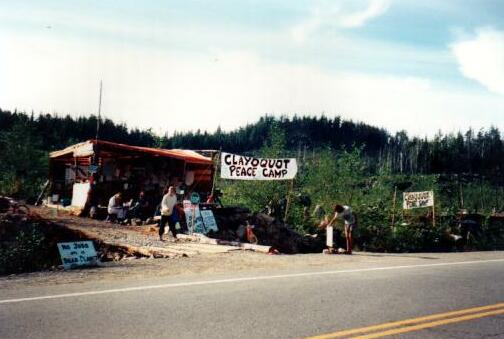
Clayoquot Sound Peace Camp blockade, protesting clear-cut logging

In Canada, the British Columbia environment movement is among the most important modern movements in the country. The movement has received substantial coverage and has led to important changes in policies. The peace camp that was set up to help the people gathered in the area in order to stop the clear-cut logging in Clayoquot Sound on Vancouver Island, British Columbia, was based upon ecofeminist principles. This movement, as part of a campaign against clear-cut logging, attracted 12,000 people to the peace camp at the beginning of the summer of 1993. By the end of the summer, 800 of them had been arrested, and some were sentenced to time in prison; two-thirds of the people arrested were women. This is the largest incident of this type in Canadian history.

The camp and the principles on which it is built insist on international connections while during the same time (the 1990s), feminist theories and activism were criticized for their universalism. Despite the contradictions with current trends in the 1990s, the peace camp was built fully with gender equality being kept at the forefront of environmental activism. The camp was able to challenge the power relations and the systems prioritizing profits over social and environmental benefits. Another success factor of the Clayoquot Sound peace camp lies in the fact that this movement was a mixed-gender movement, but it was successful in achieving ecofeminism goals.

== Canada supporting ecofeminism internationally ==
Internationally, according to the Canadian Feminist International Assistance Policy, Canada has opted for a feminist approach in its governance. One of the main actions of the policy, that Canada is planning on assisting women everywhere to achieve, is regarding environmental and climate action mainly focusing on mitigation measures and water management.

== Media attention ==
=== Publications ===
==== The Women and Environment ====
The Women and Environment periodical published in Toronto is known to be covering feminist interpretations of the environment. Although many believed that the work of such publications is politicized by the global economy, however, there have been efforts to prove that many white, middle-class women can also be identified as ecofeminists. As a contribution to ecofeminism by the periodical, work of Sherilyn MacGregor was published where she conducted interviews with 30 women in Toronto in the 90s. She explored their activities and their intents, which was based on neighbourhoodism and Earth care, and in her book, Beyond Mothering Earth, based on the conclusions drawn from the interviews she called this type of activism eco-maternalism. The goal was to show the inclusivity of ecofeminism.

==== The MaddAddam Trilogy ====
This Margaret Atwood trilogy appeals to Canadian readers as many of them are exposed to the effects of mining, oil and gas drilling, and deforestation. In the first two novels, Oryx and Crake, and The Year of the Flood, Atwood warns about the impacts of consumerism and capitalism but in her third book of the trilogy, MaddAddam offers a holistic ecofeminist approach to solve the issues she describes in her first two works. Oryx and Crake show the failure of cultural feminism and its failed focus on the positive connection between women and the natural world. In her second book, The year of the Flood, Atwood explores a postfeminist view and tries to show that having a female perspective, does not guarantee female power. In the third book, MaddAddam, Atwood mentions the impacts of climate change on women, the environment, and food. She talks about new trends in food and how foodways can be considered as resistance and are mostly undertaken by women.

==== There's something in the water: Indigenous Racism in Indigenous and Black communities ====
Written by Ingrid R. G. Waldron in 2018, the inherent environmental racism in Canada is examined, while Nova Scotia is chosen as a case study. The author examines the grassroot activities done to resist the pollution of their environment and water specifically. In the book, author, analyzes the impacts of power imbalance and settler colonial mindsets on environmental racism. Waldron also shows how new projects are adding more harm and complexities to communities already vulnerable to historical environmental injustices. The book won the Society do Socialist Studies 2019 Errol Sharpe book prize.

=== Television ===
==== Fury for the sound: the women at Clayoquot ====
A documentary made about Clayoquot called “Fury for the Sound: the women at Clayoquot” received a lot of attention and was widely shown across Canadian Television. This movie, directed by Shelley Wine in 1997, focuses on the role of women at Clayoquot in establishing social grass root movements. The movie is aimed to educate the public about the role of women in organizing for political change. To do so, it shows women of different age groups moving away from the comfort of their homes to protect one of the largest remaining parts of Canadian rainforests. The documentary tries to convey the message that women are uniquely equipped to save this planet.

==== There's something in the water ====
A documentary made by Elliot Page, about environmental racism and sexism in Nova Scotia in 2019. The movie shows how rural areas in Nova Scotia are suffering the consequences of toxic waste in the area, such as a higher rate of cancer. The movie shows Indigenous and African women resisting the polluting of their lands and water. Their main fight depicted in the movie is against Alton Gas Company's plan to pollute the Shubenacadie River, which is the main source of fishing for surrounding communities.

== Criticism ==
=== Indigenous Cultural appropriation ===
Settler environmental movements rely heavily on how Indigenous women and Two-Spirit Peoples care for and have responsibilities towards the land or in other words using their Indigenous Knowledge. What ecofeminists fail to understand is that Indigenous traditional knowledge expands much further than environmental politics and is engrained in Indigenous culture and spirituality. Winona LaDuke talks about the relationship that Indigenous Peoples have that are outside their human kin, and this is honored through ceremonies, songs, and reciprocity with their environments. Incorporating Indigenous Knowledge is attracting Western scientists, however, the problem with this approach is that it can be an appropriation of the Indigenous conception of the world, and also it can lead to ignoring the colonial history and the harms it caused Indigenous Peoples. If ecofeminists want to acknowledge Indigenous Knowledge, they should not separate it from its political context.

Ecofeminists who incorporate Indigenous Knowledge into ecofeminism as Western science, fail to understand the environmental injustice faced by Indigenous Peoples and in particular by Indigenous women and Two Spirit. Indigenous Peoples believe that the solutions offered by the ecofeminism way of thinking should extend far beyond the return of the land, which is the main goal of Western solidarity movements since Indigenous Communities are usually in close proximity to mining sites, military bases and other sources of environmental contaminants and these contaminants are affecting their overall health.

=== Colonialism ===
There are critiques of white ecofeminists as they are already privileged with using the land that was violently taken away from Indigenous communities who were the actual owners of the land. It can be argued that since non-Indigenous people have been stealing the Indigenous land and have disrupted their environment since contact and colonization, they need to respect their land sovereignty and meaningfully engage with them if they want to advocate for Indigenous women. Another source of criticism is the use of Indigenous spirituality to help white ecofeminists run their agenda while they are detached from the community itself

=== Non-inclusivity ===
Another source of criticism is the exclusion of white, urban dwellers from the ecofeminism discussion in the Canadian context. These activists' and authors’ efforts in caring for the Earth while fulfilling their responsibilities as a citizen cannot be overlooked. All voices need to be heard to expand environmental and feminist knowledge and urban Canadian women are part of the ecofeminist movement in Canada as well.

The variety of positions, voices, and locations in the ecofeminism realm, suggests that ecofeminism is inclusive as it is shown in many accounts as ecofeminism is covered by different women from different backgrounds. But still, there are some anthologies which that believe this school of thought is omitting important ranges of voices in ecofeminism.

As is suggested by ecofeminists that it is mainly men who are the main cause of oppression against nature and women in a patriarchal society. This statement is to show that putting too much value on male human life is the problem. However, this implies that both nature and Indigenous Peoples are feminine and therefore are less valuable, whereas activities such as extracting are known to be more masculine and more valuable in a patriarchal society and will lead to continued oppression. This has led to undervaluing the act of caring for other people as a way of caring for the environment. Settler colonialism has influenced the assignment of the role of caregiving to women. Ecofeminism is criticized in the Canadian context, as not disrupting the colonial caregiving framework. As Kim TallBear, of Sisseton-Wahpeton Oyate, puts it, “caretaking…[is not] the sole domain of cis-gendered, biologically-reproductive women". On the same notion, queer ecofeminists challenge the notion of heterosexuality and dualism and argue that the diversity of the natural environment should be mirrored in ecofeminism.

== See also ==
- Feminism in Canada
- Chipko Movement
- Eco-socialism
- Grassroot Activism
- Idle no more
