= Economy of Halifax, Nova Scotia =

The Halifax Regional Municipality is a major generator of economic activity in Atlantic Canada.

== Largest employers ==
=== Government and military ===
The largest employer in the municipality is government, with most provincial government departments headquartered in the area, as well as many regional offices for federal government departments and agencies.

The Department of National Defence is the single largest employer and Halifax Harbour continues to serve a major military purpose as the Atlantic Ocean home port for the Royal Canadian Navy. CFB Halifax is Canada's largest naval base and the nation's largest military base in number of personnel. This base comprises various shore-based facilities including HMC Dockyard, Stadacona, CFAD Bedford, and other adjunct facilities throughout HRM and central Nova Scotia. Approximately 2/3 of the navy's major ships are home ported in Halifax. Another major military facility is located at 12 Wing, CFB Shearwater in Eastern Passage. This is the home base of naval aviation in Canada and is used as a heliport for the CH-148 Cyclone.

=== Port of Halifax ===
The largest influence on HRM's economy is its port and related spin-offs. Halifax is one of Canada's top four container ports in terms of the volume of cargo handled. Halifax Harbour is strategically located just north of the Great Circle Route between western Europe and the Eastern Seaboard of North America as the first inbound, last outbound major port of call on the continent with strategic rail connections to central and western Canada and the United States. The Halifax Port Authority operates two major container terminals, a medium-sized oil refinery, numerous general cargo piers and more specialized cargo handling piers for products such as automobiles and bulk gypsum. In 2021, the port of Halifax handled over 4.9 million tonnes of cargo.

Port facilities are also increasingly used for logistics support of offshore natural gas production platforms near Sable Island, and for ongoing oil and gas exploration. The port has a shipyard and the eastern side of the harbour is home to Canadian Coast Guard Base Dartmouth and the internationally renowned Bedford Institute of Oceanography. In recent years, there has been an increase in number of cruise ships through a redeveloped passenger terminal at Pier 21. The port is also the eastern terminus of the transcontinental Canadian National Railway which maintains extensive facilities around the waterfront.

The Halifax Shipyard is one of Canada's most well-equipped, having recently undergone a $300-million modernization to accommodate the building of new combat vessels for the Canadian navy.

Another deep water port is the Sheet Harbour Industrial Port, which mainly serves the offshore and forestry industry in eastern Nova Scotia.

== Primary industries ==
Aboriculture, agriculture, aquaculture, gas extraction, hunting, and mining-and-quarrying are major resource industries found in rural Halifax. As of 2021, 2,560 people work in primary industry.

Forestry is most common in the Eastern Shore - Musquodoboit Valley area where there are 21 sawmills.

The main agriculture area of the Halifax Regional Municipality is the Musquodoboit Valley.

Fishing harbours are located along all coastal areas with some having an independent harbour authority, and others being managed by small craft harbours under the federal Department of Fisheries and Oceans.

There are natural gas fields off the coast of Sable Island. Furthermore, clay, shale, gold, gypsum, and limestone extraction industry operates in rural areas of the municipality.

== Secondary industries ==
Halifax is a major regional manufacturing centre. Statistics Canada estimates that in 2021, 28,430 people work in secondary industry.

It is an exporter of beer, being home to the Keith's brewery and Oland Brewery as well as several local specialty beers produced in micro-breweries.

The aerospace industry has an increasing significance in the regional economy, through engine manufacturer Pratt and Whitney Canada, and IMP Aerospace, as well as the increasing passenger and cargo traffic at Halifax International Airport.

== Tertiary industries ==
With the largest population centre in Atlantic Canada and a geographically central location in Nova Scotia, Halifax Regional Municipality has witnessed a transformation in its economy during recent decades with the growth of its tertiary industry. An estimated 206,840 people work within the tertiary industry as of 2021.

The historic home to the Bank of Nova Scotia (branch #1 is located there), the municipality has received an influx of banking and financial service-related employment in recent years. Maritime Life is headquartered in the municipality and many call centres, computer and information technology firms are located in HRM. Halifax is also home to the three largest law firms in Atlantic Canada, McInnes Cooper, Stewart McKelvey, and Cox Palmer.

Halifax also hosts a growing number of Commercial Buildings and Coworking spaces like Regus and The Office coworking space located at 600 Bedford Highway to serve the expanding business community.

== Business areas ==
Halifax Regional Municipality has multiple business parks.

Aerotech Business Park in Goffs is approximately 34 km (21 mi) from Downtown Halifax. The park is roughly 972 ha (2,400 acres) in size, is home to 17 businesses, and employs over 550 people.

Within the Burnside Industrial Park is the Atlantic Gateway Logisitics Park. Its employment-and-geographic statistics are associated with the Burnside Industrial Park.

Bayers Lake Business Park in Bayers Lake has over 300 businesses, employs 2,000 people, and covers an area of 236 ha (580 acres) of which 153 ha (380 acres) is developed. The park is approximately 11 km (6.8 mi) from Downtown Halifax.

Approximately 10 km (6.2 mi) from Downtown Halifax in Burnside, the Burnside Industrial Park is a 1,376 ha (3,400 acres) mix of industrial-and-residential land use. Approximately 2,000 businesses operate within its boundary with over 30,000 employees.

Between the Burnside Industrial Park-and-Dartmouth Crossing, the City of Lakes Business Park is approximately 10 km (6.2 mi) from Downtown Halifax. The employment-and-geographic information is associated with Burnside Park.

In Beechville and approximately 12 km (7.5 mi) from Downtown Halifax, Ragged Lake Business Park is 486 ha (1,200 acres) of industrial-residential mixed land use - approximately 204 ha (500 acres) of the total land is developed. 11 business operate within the area with a combined employment of over 100 people.

== Growth prospects ==
The economy of HRM has been relatively strong in the past decade. Growth in public sector employment at all levels of government that far exceeds demographic population growth nationally, coupled with wage and benefits packages that are at least 12% greater than comparative private sector jobs have provided HRM with sustained growth in population and economic activity in recent years. HRM has also benefited from a demographic shift of younger Atlantic Canadians from rural and small town communities to urban centres.

Another important ingredient in HRM's growth has been a major investment in offshore oil and gas exploration, resulting in many high-paying jobs locating to the area. Halifax Harbour was also the staging site for much of the development of the Sable Offshore Energy natural gas project during the late 1990s, as well as somewhat smaller crude oil development projects during the 1970s-1990s.

Unemployment is relatively low (5.9% in July 2010) and is well below both the provincial and national averages.

== Communications ==
HRM is also a major communication centre and gateway.

Private sector telecommunication companies Bell Aliant and Eastlink have extensive service in the municipality and offer wire telephone, Internet and television signals.

Rogers Wireless, Bell Canada, and Telus offer cellular telephone service in urban areas and along major transportation corridors.

The communities of Pennant Point, Herring Cove and Beaver Harbour are landing sites for fibre optic Trans-Atlantic cables.

The communities of Harrietsfield and Pennant Point are home to earth stations.

== Corporate headquarters ==
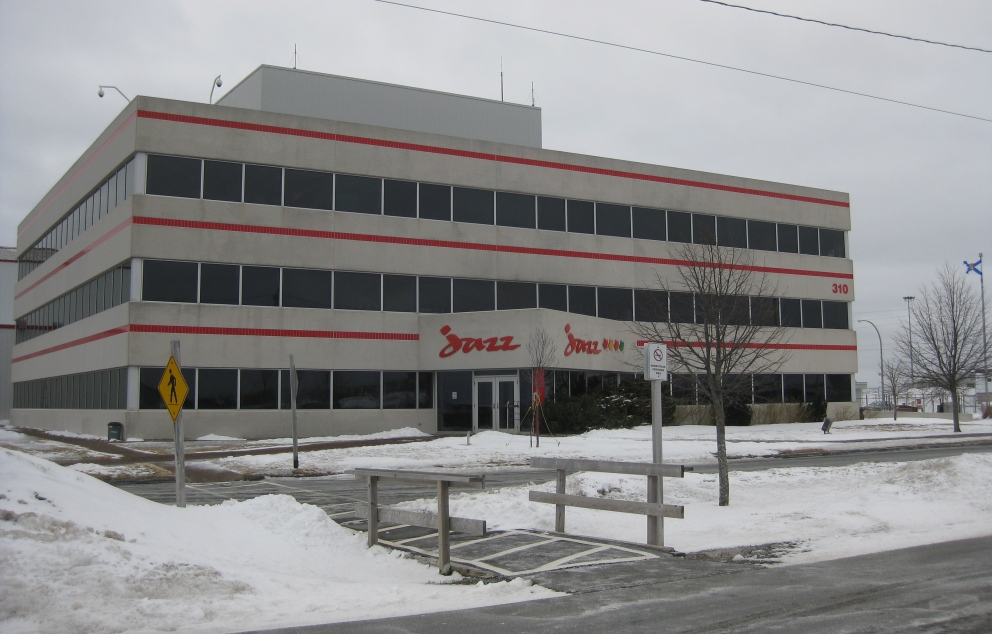
Headquarters of Air Canada Jazz

Air Canada Jazz, CanJet, and Maritime Air Charter are headquartered in Enfield and in the Halifax Regional Municipality.

Regional airline Air Nova, which became a part of Air Canada Jazz, was headquartered in Enfield.
