= John Gerrish Pulsifer =

Canadian prospector

John Gerrish Pulsifer sparked the first gold rush in Nova Scotia, Canada, when he discovered gold in the Mooseland region in 1860.

John Pulsifer was a farmer from Musquodoboit who began a search in the Tangier River in the same area where the first authenticated discovery was made by Captain Champagne L'Estrange of the Royal Artillery two years earlier. Pulsifer was accompanied by the same Mi’kmaq guide, Joe Paul, who had accompanied Captain L'Estrange. He is credited as the "discoverer" of gold in Nova Scotia as he was the first to convince the provincial government of the presence of gold around Tangier.
