= List of communities in Inverness County, Nova Scotia =

List of communities in Inverness County, Nova Scotia

These are all unincorporated areas within the jurisdiction of the Municipality of the County of Inverness except the incorporated town of Port Hawkesbury.

- Chéticamp
- Grand Étang
- Hillsboro or Hillsborough
- Inverness
- Judique
- Mabou
- Meat Cove
- Orangedale
- Pleasant Bay
- Port Hastings
- Port Hawkesbury
- Port Hood
- St. Joseph du Moine
- Southwest Margaree
- Whycocomagh

== Former ==
- Cap-Rouge
