= List of airlines of Nova Scotia =

This is a list of airlines of Nova Scotia which have an air operator's certificate issued by Transport Canada, the country's civil aviation authority. These are airlines that are based in Nova Scotia.

== Current airlines ==
Airline	Image	IATA	ICAO	Callsign	Hub airport(s) or headquarters	Notes
Jazz		QK	JZA	JAZZ	Halifax Stanfield	Formally Jazz Aviation LP, regional and charter airline, operates as Air Canada Express
Maritime Air Charter					Halifax Stanfield	Air charter. Provides fixed-wing service for Environment Canada to Sable Island. Example colours only; aircraft no longer registered in Canada.

== Defunct airlines ==
Airline	Image	IATA	ICAO	Callsign	Hub airport(s) or headquarters	Notes
CanJet		C6	CJA	CANJET	Halifax Stanfield	2002 – 2015 low cost charter airline
Air Nova		QK	ARN	NOVA	Halifax Stanfield	1986 – 2001; Merged into Air Canada Jazz
