= Hammonds Plains, Upper Sackville and Beaverbank, Nova Scotia =

Hammonds Plains, Upper Sackville and Beaverbank
- Planning Area
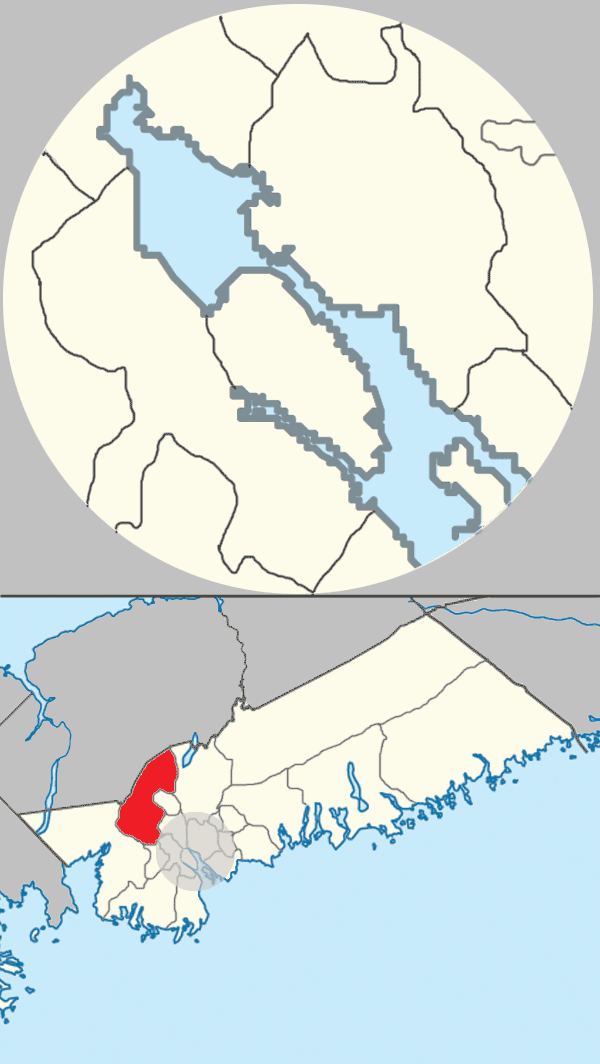
- Location of Hammonds Plains, Upper Sackville and Beaverbank planning area of municipal Halifax

- Location within Nova Scotia
- Coordinates: 44.81°N 63.75°W
- Country: Canada
- Province: Nova Scotia
- Municipality: Halifax Regional Municipality
- Founded: 1996 (as planning area)
- Communities: Hammonds Plains, Upper Sackville, Beaver Bank

Government
  - Councils: Marine Drive, Valley & Canal, and Western Region Councils
- Time zone: UTC-4 (AST)
- Postal code span: B
- Area code: 902
- Part of a series about Places in Nova Scotia

Hammonds Plains, Upper Sackville and Beaver Bank is a planning area in the Halifax Regional Municipality, Nova Scotia. The area wraps from Exit 5 on Highway 103 to the west of the urban core of Halifax, and runs north and east, wrapping clockwise around the harbour along the Hammonds Plains Road, Lucasville Road and Sackville Drive, through Upper Sackville to Beaverbank.

Hammonds Plains lies at the neck of the Chebucto Peninsula along a road that runs from Bedford to the Head of St. Margarets Bay within the Halifax Regional Municipality Nova Scotia. Upper Sackville is a Canadian suburban community in Nova Scotia's Halifax Regional Municipality. It is situated in the Sackville River valley immediately north of Middle Sackville and south of Mount Uniacke on Trunk 1. Upper Sackville is approximately 23 kilometers driving distance from downtown Halifax. Beaver Bank is a community northeast of Lower Sackville on the Beaver Bank Road (Route 354) within the Halifax Regional Municipality Nova Scotia that is 25 Kilometers from the community of Halifax.

== Communities ==
- Beaver Bank
- Hammonds Plains
- Kinsac
- Lucasville
- Sackville
- Stillwater Lake
