= Gold mining in Nova Scotia =

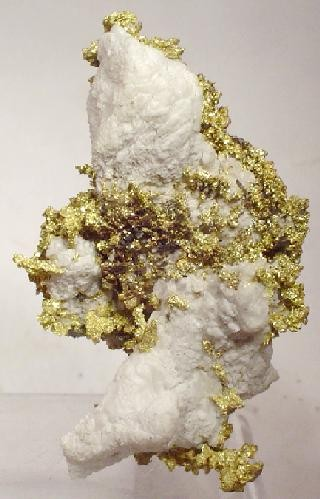
A particularly fine example of Nova Scotia gold

Gold mining has been a part of Nova Scotia's heritage for 150 plus years and continues to this day. Over a million ounces of gold have been produced in the province since mining began in 1861. Although not as well known as the gold rushes of California, the Klondike, Australia, and South Africa, three distinct rushes resulted in an economic boom in the province and saw the birth and sometimes demise of many new communities.

There are 65 declared gold districts in Nova Scotia. There were around 350 mines worked in these districts.

== Geology ==
Most gold mining in the province has taken place south of the Minas Fault Zone in Meguma terrane, with three more mines in Cape Breton.

== Discovery and production ==
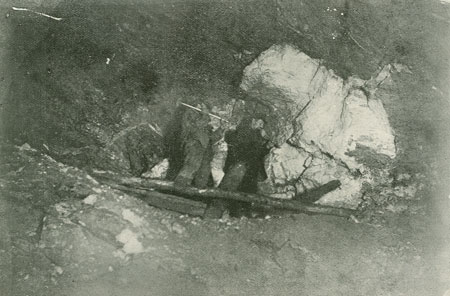
Richardson Gold Mine c. 1900

Gold may have been sighted as early as 1578 when explorer Sir Humphrey Gilbert was given a patent to explore for gold and silver in the New World and explored along the coast. Additionally, village names such as Bras d'Or, Cape d'Or, and Jeddore (Jet d'Or) indicate that French settlers may have found gold, but no ancient workings or proof has been found.

Gold was officially discovered in Nova Scotia in late May 1860, by John G. Pulsifer at Mooseland, Halifax County. Prior to this, unofficial discoveries were made in the Musquodoboit and Fort Clarence areas in 1857. The first authenticated discovery was made by Captain Champagne L'Estrange of the Royal Artillery in 1858 in Mooseland, the same area where Pulsifer made his discovery two years later.

=== First Gold Rush (1861–1874) ===
The first gold rush in Nova Scotia began in 1861 and lasted until 1874. Gold hysteria attracted thousands to the gold fields. This was the most dramatic of the rushes, initially characterized by the frenzy of inexperienced miners with dreams of striking it rich.

In the beginning, the miners panned for gold or smashed quartz rocks with hand tools at small individual claims. Within a year, companies began arriving in the area with heavy machinery to construct shafts, dig ore, crush rock, and process the gold. They had the capital to finance underground mines and bought up smaller claims, consolidating them into larger holdings.

In an effort to control the gold hysteria in April 1861, the government of Nova Scotia intervened and declared the Mooseland and nearby Tangier gold districts. After the declaration, other discoveries along the Eastern Shore were quick to follow in the next half year. The communities of Tangier, Lawrencetown, The Ovens, Wine Harbour, Sherbrooke (Goldenville), Waverley, Country Harbour, Isaacs Harbour and Gold River sprung up 'overnight' and the miners and their families moved in.

=== Second Gold Rush (1896–1903) ===
1906 map of gold districts

The second gold rush period was dominated by large companies, who continued buying up smaller claims, and hiring locals to mine and operate the stamp mills and machinery. Individual consignment miners, known as tributors, worked claims as well. The province became known as the place of "rich man's diggings" due to the large costs involved in deep mines working lower grade ore. Capital investment, often American and British, and the improved technology needed to build and operate the mines ballooned into a multimillion-dollar industry. This period is considered the golden age of gold mining in Nova Scotia. Production exceeded 20,000 ounces per year for sixteen years and in three of those years exceeded 30,000 ounces annually (1898, 1900, 1901). Along with racking up the highest yields per year, this period is noted more for organized planning than feverish hysteria.

=== Third Gold Rush (1932–1942) ===
The demand for arsenopyrite, a mineral associated with gold in Nova Scotia, along with cheap energy costs and an increase in the price of gold (US$20.67 to US$34 per ounce), created an impetus for Nova Scotia's third gold rush. The rush spanned ten years (1932–1942) and 158,000 ounces (4,479,300 g) of gold were produced.

== Recent activity ==
Atlantic Gold (previously DDV Gold Ltd.) opened an open pit gold mine at Moose River Gold Mines in 2017. Deposits at the project named Touquoy hold an estimated 635,000 ounces of gold, worth $700 million in 2012. The Moose River Gold Mines site will also process ore from the company's mine at its Beaver Dam deposit, 37 km away, which has an estimated yield of 426,600 ounces. The Moose River mine will have a life of five years and Beaver Dam just three. Production at the Touquoy deposit began in 2018. See also: Orex Exploration.

In 2018 the Government of Nova Scotia initiated the process of closing former gold mining sites in Montague Gold Mines and Goldenville that are heavily contaminated with arsenic and mercury.

== Gold districts ==
There are 65 declared gold districts in Nova Scotia. There were around 350 mines worked in these districts.

Region	District	Production Start	Production Finish	Production	Comment
Yarmouth	Carleton	1879	1940	190.2	
Yarmouth	Chegoggin	1883		not available	ca. 1883
Yarmouth	Cranberry Head	1870	1900	249.3	
Yarmouth	Kemptvllle	1885	1939	2487.90	
Kejlmkujlk	Brookfield	1887	1936	43147.50	
Kejlmkujlk	Fifteen Mile Brook	1902	1934	880.6	
Kejlmkujlk	Molega (Malaga)	1888	1950	33460.20	
Kejlmkujlk	Pleasant River Barrens	1890	1913	111.8	
Kejlmkujlk	Stanburn	1933	1936	12.7	
Kejlmkujlk	West Caledonia	1925		1.7	
Kejlmkujlk	Whiteburn	1887	1955	11906.70	
South Shore	Blockhouse	1896	1938	3588.50	
South Shore	Gold River	1889	1940	7610.40	
South Shore	Leipsigate (Millipsigate)	1884	1946	13563.20	
South Shore	Mill Village	1901	1951	909.8	
South Shore	The Ovens	1862	1958	550.4	
South Shore	Voglers Cove	1905		43.4	
Central	Ardolse	1890	1904	6.8	
Central	Central Rawdon	1888	1939	6920.50	
Central	Chezzetcook	1883	1944	5528.10	
Central	Cow Bay	1896	1937	1483.50	
Central	East Rawdon	1884	1932	13501.00	
Central	Elmsdale	1890		1.4	
Central	Gays River	1870	1968	2268.20	
Central	Lake Catcha	1887	1961	17961.50	
Central	Lawrencetown	1862	1912	866.7	
Central	McKay Settlement	1904	1910	13.5	
Central	Montague	1863	1940	65196.90	
Central	Mount Uniacke	1867	1941	27737.00	
Central	Oldham	1862	1946	85177.50	
Central	Renfrew	1862	1958	51595.50	
Central	South Uniacke	1888	1948	20762.10	
Central	Waverley	1862	1940	72566.60	
Central	West Gore	1905	1939	7148.80	
Eastern Shore	Beaver Dam	1889	1949	966.7	
Eastern Shore	Caribou	1869	1968	91335.80	
Eastern Shore	Clam Harbour	1904		53.9	
Eastern Shore	Ecum Secum	1893	1935	1300.00	
Eastern Shore	Fifteen Mile Stream	1878	1941	21291.60	
Eastern Shore	Gold Lake	1890	1899	38.6	
Eastern Shore	Harrigan Cove	1874	1961	8071.30	
Eastern Shore	Killag	1889	1951	3583.60	
Eastern Shore	Lake Charlotte	1938	1964	77.5	
Eastern Shore	Little Liscomb Lake	1893	1935	51.9	
Eastern Shore	Lochaber	1883		2.3	
Eastern Shore	Miller Lake	1902	1951	538.8	
Eastern Shore	Moosehead	1899	1935	431.1	
Eastern Shore	Mooseland	1863	1934	3865.10	1860, First Discovery in Nova Scotia
Eastern Shore	Moose River	1888	1939	25917.20	Production before 1888 included with Caribou
Eastern Shore	Quoddy	1906		1	
Eastern Shore	Salmon River (Darrs Hill)	1881	1939	41805.40	
Eastern Shore	Sheet Harbour	1898	1935	3.9	
Eastern Shore	Ship Harbour	1935	1937	7.4	
Eastern Shore	Tangier	1862	1919	26286.50	
Eastern Shore	Upper Stewiacke	1906	1907	43.9	
Stormont	Caledonia	1934	1956	3.6	
Stormont	Cochrane Hill	1877	1982	2081.30	
Stormont	Country Harbour	1871	1951	9959.70	
Stormont	Forest Hill	1895	1957	25102.40	
Stormont	Goldenville (Sherbrooke)	1862	1941	209383.30	
Stormont	Isaacs Harbour	1862	1958	39694.30	
Stormont	Lower Seal Harbour	1894	1949	34188.20	
Stormont	Upper Seal Harbour	1893	1958	57845.70	
Stormont	Wine Harbour	1862	1939	42346.50	
Cape Breton	Wagmatacook (Middle River)	1864	1943	1729.40	
Cape Breton	Stirling	1936	1956	16681.10	

== See also ==
- Uranium mining in Nova Scotia
- List of mines in Nova Scotia
