= Preston & Cherrybrook, Nova Scotia =

Community in Nova Scotia, Canada

Coordinates: 44.725°N 63.474°W

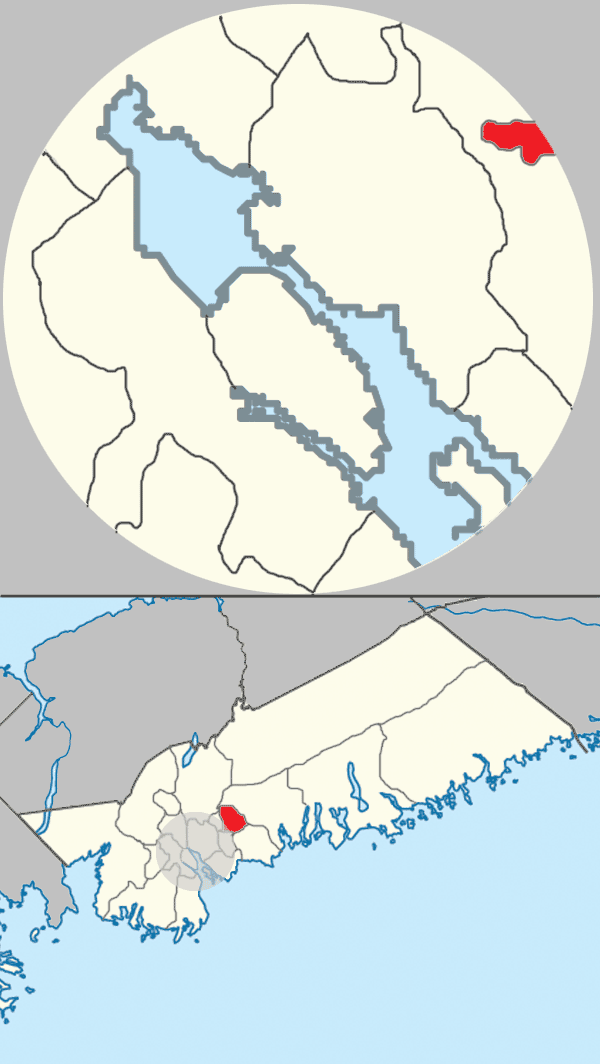
Map of Preston & Cherrybrook planning area of municipal Halifax.

Preston & Cherrybrook is a community and planning area of the Halifax Regional Municipality in Nova Scotia, Canada. It includes the villages of Preston, East Preston, North Preston, and Cherry Brook. The area was settled by African Nova Scotians following the American Revolutionary War.
