= List of mines in Nova Scotia =

This list of mines in Nova Scotia, Canada is subsidiary to the list of mines and list of mines in Canada articles. This list includes working, defunct and future mines in the country and is organised by the primary mineral output. For practical purposes stone, marble and other quarries may be included in this list.

== Coal ==
| Mine | Coordinates | Town | Owner | Dates | Comments |
|---|---|---|---|---|---|
| Springhill coalfield | 45°40′N 64°4′W | Springhill, Nova Scotia | A.V. Roe Canada Company Ltd. | ????-1958 | Coal was so prevalent in the town that "there was a time when men got coal out of their backyards; shallow pits were found everywhere. In recent years, there have been instances when a homeowner would step out of his door only to find a big gaping hole where his driveway had been. Another part of an old mine had caved in." |
| Westray Mine | 45°33′14″N 062°38′44″W | Plymouth, Pictou County, Nova Scotia | Curragh Resources | 1991-1992 | It was the site of an underground methane explosion on May 9, 1992. The explosion resulted in the deaths of all 26 miners who were working underground at the time. |
| Pioneer Coal Mine | 45°33′56.5″N 62°40′30.4″W | Stellarton | Pioneer Coal | Currently open | Pioneer Coal is in the process of winding down mine operations at this site, which has been supplying coal to Nova Scotia Power. They are in search of new sources of coal in the province and have submitted a proposal in Pictou County |
| Donkin Mine | 46.1815 N 59.8746° W | Donkin | Cline Group LLC | Reopened in 2017, closed again in 2020. | The 2020 closure was a result of adverse geologic conditions in the mine. The closure resulted in approximately 150 jobs lost |

== Gold ==
| Mine | Coordinates | Town | Owner | Dates | Comments |
|---|---|---|---|---|---|
| Catcha Lake | 44°44′09″N 63°11′40″W | Halifax Regional Municipality | Acadian Gold Corporation | 1882–Present | The report indicated that 20,734 tons of ore had been crushed to date, resulting in the recovery of 22,757 ounces of gold valued at that time at $19.00 per ton WJW. Today the Acadian Gold Corporation controls approximately 6.4 kilometres of strike length on this structure and is planning to drill for samples in the future . |
| Moose River Gold Mine | 44°59′03″N 62°56′34″W | Moose River | Acadian Gold Corporation | 2017–present | The Moose River operation currently provides full-time employment to over 300 Nova Scotians, plus indirect and contractor positions. In its first year alone, the mine produced over 90,000 ounces of gold. As of March 25, 2019, the Moose River operation had a combined estimate of 1.9 million ounces of gold in reserve at a grade of 1.12 grams per tonne. |

== Abandoned Mines ==
The Nova Scotia Department of Natural Resources created the Abandoned Mine Openings Database, which is an inventory of abandoned mine workings from both underground operations and advanced exploration in the province. In the database, over 600 mining areas have been identified, consisting of over 7,000 shafts, adits, slopes, trenches, and associated underground workings which are or once were open to the surface. The database is updated regularly whenever locations are visited, or new mine openings are identified. The inventory can be filtered by mine opening name, mine opening type, location, claim, reference map, landowner type, commodity mined, county, name of vein or seam, hazard degree and by mine opening original depth.

The Nova Scotia Department of Natural Resources created the Abandoned Mine Openings Remediation Program in 2001 which has a budget of $50,000 a year to remediate openings that are located mainly on crown land, of which there are 2000. The Geoscience and Mines Branch of the Department of Natural Resources carries out regular inspections of the openings. This is managed on a three-year cycle in which almost every abandoned mine opening on crown land is inspected and assigned a degree of hazard. The hazard ratings range from Type I (inescapable) to Type IV (no significant hazard) and the openings are remediated in order of safety hazard. Closing all of the Type I abandoned mine openings on Crown land was the top priority of the Abandoned Mine Openings Remediation Program and was accomplished by the end of 2011. Remediation is completed by means of back-filling, fencing or placement of concrete caps over the mine opening. As deforestation and urban development increase, abandoned mines have become an important source of habitat for a number of bat species. Thus, the closure of abandoned mine openings presents a potential threat to bat populations. In response, habitat surveys have become an essential part of abandoned mine assessments. Should the area be deemed important for habitat preservation, the method of closure will be designed to suit the resident species.

From 2001 to 2015, approximately $810,000 was spent remediating hazardous openings on crown land. As of 2015, all 40 Type I abandoned mine openings and approximately 40% of Type II openings on crown land have now been remediated.

In 2019, the Auditor General of Nova Scotia identified a significant control weakness relating to the Department of Lands and Forestry’s financial reporting of abandoned mine sites. The Department of Lands and Forestry had not completed adequate investigations at all abandoned mine sites which were identified to have possible areas of contamination. Unidentified potential contaminants may result in ecological or human health concerns. Further investigation is ongoing.

== See also ==
- Gold mining in Nova Scotia
- Uranium mining in Nova Scotia
