= Meat Cove =

Human settlement in Nova Scotia, Canada

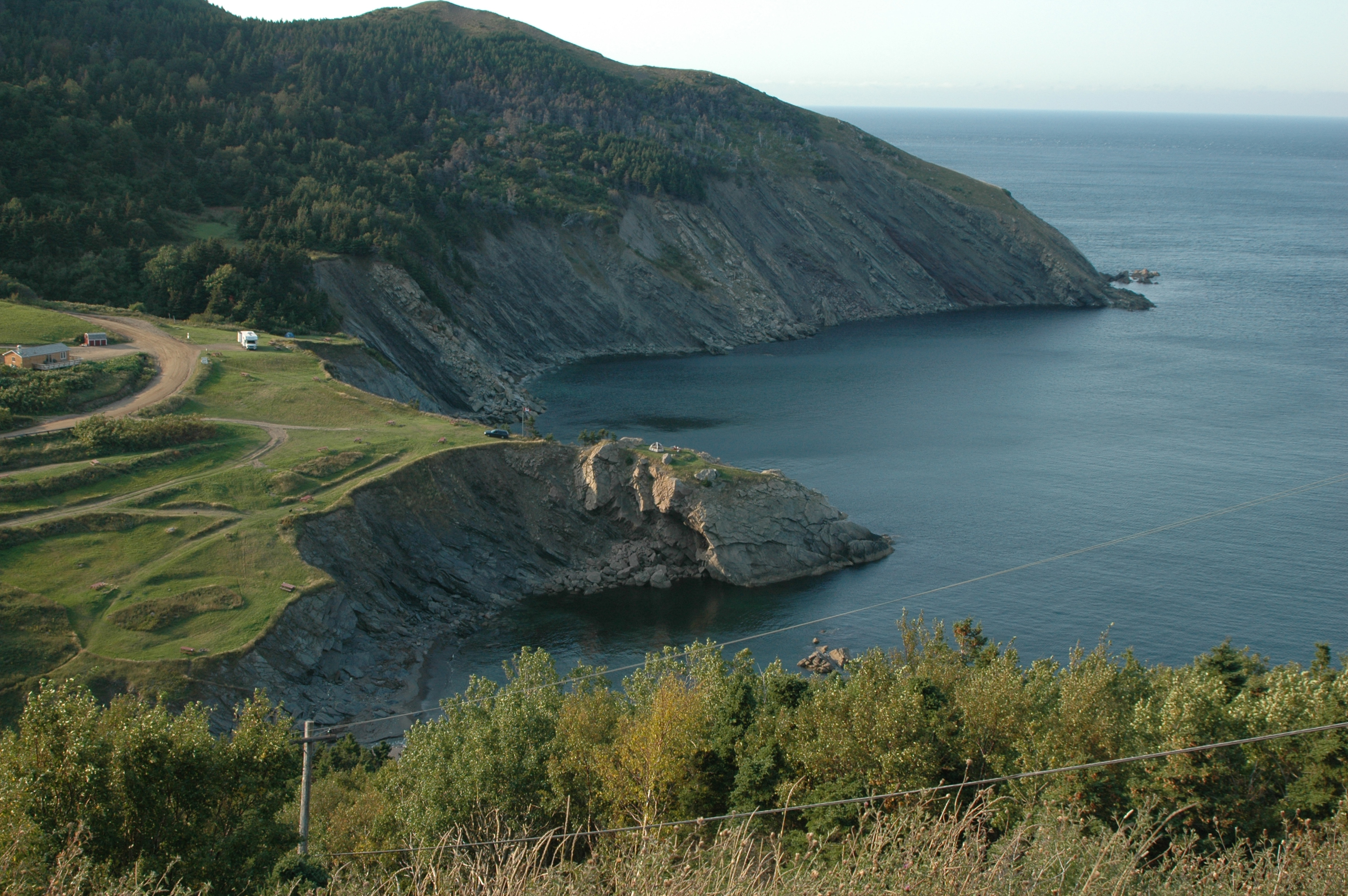

- Location within Nova Scotia
- Coordinates: 47°01′26″N 60°33′37″W
- Country: Canada
- Province: Nova Scotia
- Highest elevation: 440 m (1,440 ft)
- Lowest elevation: 0 m (0 ft)

Population
  - Total: 26
- Time zone: UTC-4 (AST)
  - Summer (DST): UTC-3 (ADT)
- Postal code: B0C 1E0
- Area code: 902-383
- GNBC Code: CAYUZ
- Part of a series about Places in Nova Scotia

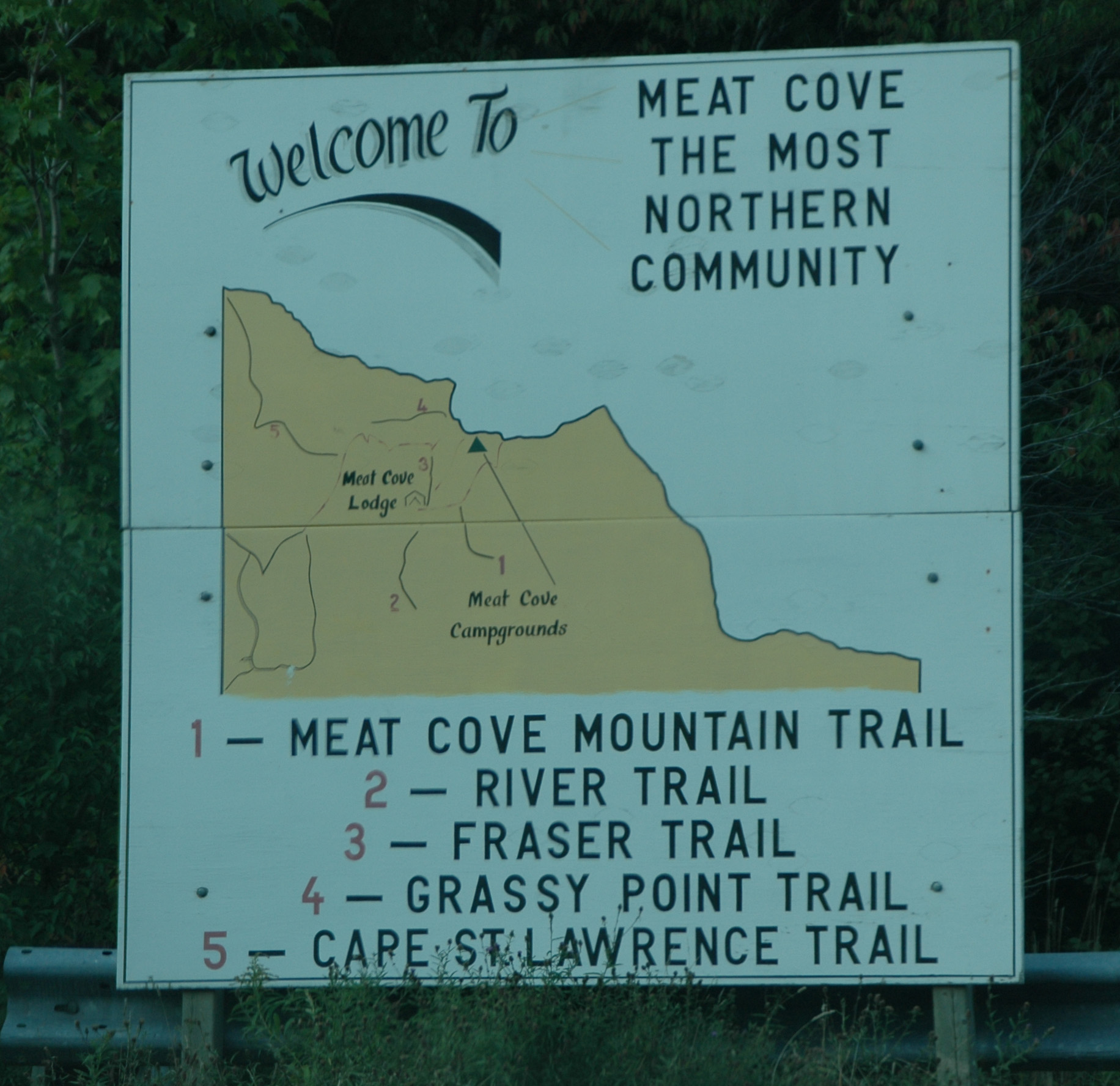
Welcome Sign at town line

Meat Cove (Scottish Gaelic: Camas na Feòla) is a rural fishing community at the northern tip of Inverness County on Cape Breton Island, Nova Scotia, Canada.

Meat Cove is the most northerly settlement in Nova Scotia and is located in the Sydney—Victoria federal electoral district. It's accessed north of Capstick on 8 km of gravel road.

On August 21, 2010, torrential rains washed away parts of the only access road to Meat Cove leaving several unable to get away from the remote community. The bridge repair was completed as of October 21, 2010.
