= Geography of Halifax, Nova Scotia =

The Halifax Regional Municipality, Nova Scotia, Canada has a widely varied geography.

== Physical geography ==
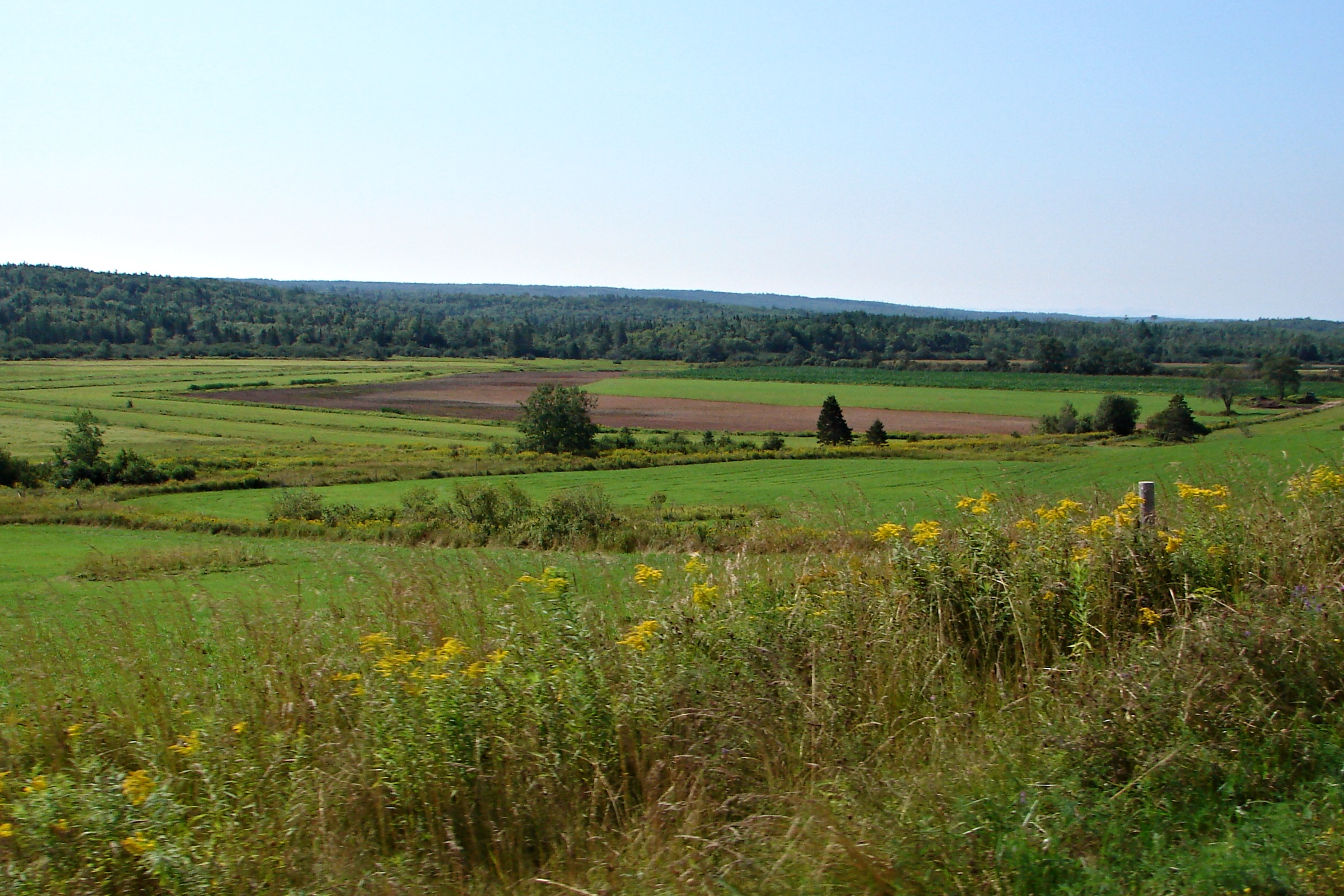
Musquodoboit Valley

Halifax Regional Municipality is geographically large. At 5,475.57 km^{2} (2,114.13 sq mi) of total landmass, the maximum north-south distance of the municipality is approximately 60 km (37 mi) while its maximum east-west distance is approximately 165 km (103 mi). Travel along its shoreline by road between its southwesterly point in Hubbards to its north easterly point in Ecum Secum is approximately 204 km (127 mi).

The topography of Halifax varies as its size suggests. It has over 400 km (250 mi) of coastline with many sandy beaches and features many coves and inlets. Inland contains vasts forests featuring many drumlins and low hills. The highest point within the municipality is Blue Mountain Summit in Hammonds Plains at 244 m (801 ft). The Musquodoboit Valley subregion includes over 714 km^{2} (276 sq mi) of fertile agricultural land.

There are many peninsulas along the coast of Halifax Regional Municipality. At the western portion of the municipality, the Chebucto Peninsula is formed by the indentations of the Bedford Basin, Halifax Harbour, and Saint Margaret's Bay. Within Halifax Harbour, the Halifax Peninsula forms a sub-peninsula.

Natural bays and harbours are throughout Halifax. Cow Bay, Saint Margaret's Bay, and Terrance Bay are the major bays. Beaver Harbour, Cole Harbour, Halifax Harbour, Indian Harbour, Jeddore Harbour, Ketch Harbour, Little Harbour, Musquodoboit Harbour, Pleasant Harbour, Popes Harbour, Prospect Harbour, Sambro Harbour, Sheet Harbour, and Ship Harbour are the major harbours.

Over twenty rivers flow through Halifax. The Chezzetcook, Musquodoboit, and Sackville rivers combined are over 125 km (78 mi) in length.

Despite being located 290 km (180 mi) southeast of Halifax Regional Municipality, Sable Island is part of the Halifax Regional Municipality. There are many hundreds of islands offshore of Halifax Regional Municipality. 100 Islands Wilderness off the coast of the eastern portion Halifax Regional Municipality contains 282 islands over an area of approximately 18,615 ha (46,000 acres) of which approximately 2,832 ha (7,000 acres) is land.

== Urban geography ==
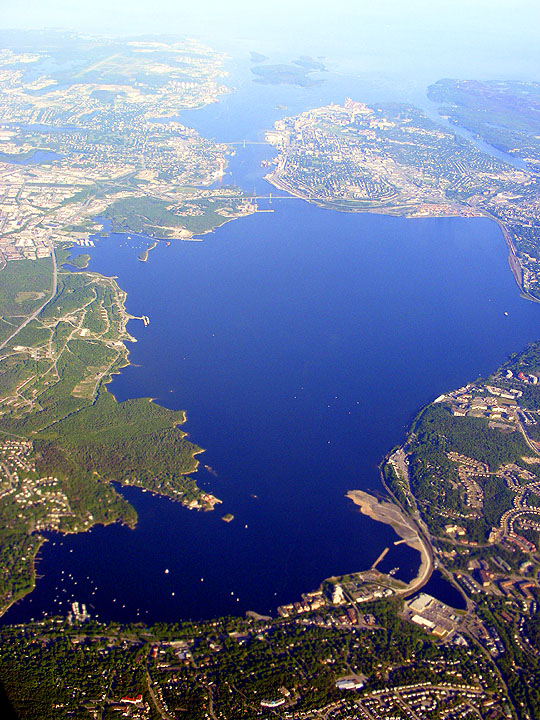
Halifax Harbour from the air looking South including the Halifax Peninsula, Dartmouth, and Bedford

Halifax contains a population centre which is built on a series of hills and plateaus which surround Halifax Harbour and is composed of numerous communities-and-neighbourhoods. The community of Halifax lies on its namesake peninsula. Across the harbour from Halifax is Dartmouth with its defining geographic feature being a series of glacial lakes. To the north of the Bedford Basin is the community of Bedford. The approximate eastern, northern, and western extremities of the built-up area are East Preston, Middle Sackville, and Timberlea.

There are many urban communities-and-environs which make up the urban fabric of Halifax. As of the 2021 Census, the built-up area consists of 238.29 km^{2} (92.00 sq mi) of landmass, has 162,336 dwellings, and is home to 348,634 people. Compared to the 2016 Census, the urban land area increased by 3.57 km^{2} (1.38 sq mi).

== Climate ==
Halifax is marked by a humid continental climate (Köppen Dfb), but the area climate is heavily influenced by water temperatures in the adjacent Atlantic Ocean. Weather is somewhat unpredictable as there are numerous local microclimates.

Commonly, average air temperatures drop to −10 °C (14 °F) in January, and exceed 25 °C (77 °F) in July. Precipitation stands at approximately 1,500 millimetres (59.1 in) annually, and is somewhat heavy year-round, though summer is drier.

Between November through April, winter snow alternately falls-and-melts - for a seasonal total of approximately 150 centimetres (59 in). Some, but usually very little, snow falls in May and October. Halifax usually experiences several strong winter storms. A blizzard in February 2004 had sustained winds in excess of 120 km/h (75 mph), produced wind gusts over 140 km/h (87 mph), and precipitated 95 centimetres (37 in) of snow. This storm was nicknamed "White Juan", as it was recently after Hurricane Juan in September of 2003.

Spring is cool and foggy. Between March and May, roughly 350 millimetres (13.8 in) of precipitation is produced which is an average amount for Halifax.

Summer can range from hot and dry to cool and rainy. Hurricanes are fairly uncommon but do occur occasionally. There can be considerable variations between the weather near the Atlantic Ocean and the weather even several kilometres inland. This is partly caused by the effect of the Labrador Current, which transfers cold water from the Arctic along Nova Scotia's Atlantic coast in the spring and summer, while the Gulf Stream brings warmer water from the Gulf of Mexico along the coast during the fall and winter.

Autumn is often sunny and warm. Temperatures commonly reach 20 °C (68 °F) during daytime during September.

The Halifax Regional Municipality is home to 6 weather stations operated by the Meteorological Service of Canada:

- Beaver Island
- Buoy 44258 Halifax Harbour
- Halifax International Airport
- Malay Falls
- McNabs Island
- Sable Island
- CFB Shearwater

Halifax

Climate chart (precipitation, max. and min. temperature)
J	F	M	A	M	J	J	A	S	O	N	D
151 0 −9	114 0 −8	134 4 −4	121 8 1	119 14 6	108 19 11	106 23 14	98 23 15	107 19 11	135 13 6	154 8 1	160 3 −5
- █ Average max. and min. temperatures in °C
- █ Precipitation totals in mm
- Source: Environment Canada
Imperial conversion
J	F	M	A	M	J	J	A	S	O	N	D
5.9 32 17	4.5 32 17	5.3 38 24	4.8 47 33	4.7 57 42	4.3 67 51	4.2 73 58	3.9 73 59	4.2 66 53	5.3 56 43	6.1 46 34	6.3 37 23
- █ Average max. and min. temperatures in °F
- █ Precipitation totals in inches

Climate data for Halifax (Citadel Hill) Climate ID: 8202220; coordinates 44°39′N 63°35′W; elevation: 70.1 m (230 ft); 1981–2010 normals, extremes 1863–present (Note: Based on station coordinates provided by Environment Canada and documentation from the Nova Scotian Institute of Science, weather data was collected in West End, Halifax from January 1863 to July 1933, at Citadel Hill from August 1933 to August 1939, at Downtown Halifax from September 1939 to July 1974, at Citadel Hill from August 1974 to January 2002 and at CFB Halifax (Windsor Park and Halifax Dockyard) from September 2004 to present.)
Month	Jan	Feb	Mar	Apr	May	Jun	Jul	Aug	Sep	Oct	Nov	Dec	Year
Record high °C (°F)	14.0 (57.2)	16.0 (60.8)	28.2 (82.8)	28.3 (82.9)	33.3 (91.9)	35.3 (95.5)	37.2 (99.0)	34.4 (93.9)	34.6 (94.3)	31.1 (88.0)	23.3 (73.9)	16.7 (62.1)	37.2 (99.0)
Mean daily maximum °C (°F)	−0.1 (31.8)	0.4 (32.7)	3.6 (38.5)	8.7 (47.7)	14.4 (57.9)	19.6 (67.3)	23.1 (73.6)	23.1 (73.6)	19.3 (66.7)	13.4 (56.1)	8.1 (46.6)	2.8 (37.0)	11.4 (52.5)
Daily mean °C (°F)	−4.1 (24.6)	−3.6 (25.5)	−0.2 (31.6)	4.9 (40.8)	10.1 (50.2)	15.2 (59.4)	18.8 (65.8)	19.1 (66.4)	15.5 (59.9)	9.9 (49.8)	4.8 (40.6)	−0.8 (30.6)	7.5 (45.5)
Mean daily minimum °C (°F)	−8.2 (17.2)	−7.5 (18.5)	−3.9 (25.0)	1.0 (33.8)	5.8 (42.4)	10.7 (51.3)	14.4 (57.9)	15.1 (59.2)	11.8 (53.2)	6.4 (43.5)	1.5 (34.7)	−4.3 (24.3)	3.6 (38.5)
Record low °C (°F)	−27.2 (−17.0)	−29.4 (−20.9)	−23.3 (−9.9)	−13.9 (7.0)	−5.0 (23.0)	0.0 (32.0)	4.4 (39.9)	3.9 (39.0)	−1.7 (28.9)	−7.2 (19.0)	−15.6 (3.9)	−25.6 (−14.1)	−29.4 (−20.9)
Average precipitation mm (inches)	139.7 (5.50)	110.1 (4.33)	132.5 (5.22)	118.3 (4.66)	119.1 (4.69)	111.8 (4.40)	110.3 (4.34)	96.4 (3.80)	108.9 (4.29)	124.3 (4.89)	151.4 (5.96)	145.1 (5.71)	1,468.1 (57.80)
Average rainfall mm (inches)	96.7 (3.81)	75.1 (2.96)	101.3 (3.99)	111.3 (4.38)	118.4 (4.66)	111.8 (4.40)	110.3 (4.34)	96.4 (3.80)	108.9 (4.29)	124.1 (4.89)	143.6 (5.65)	115.9 (4.56)	1,313.9 (51.73)
Average snowfall cm (inches)	43.1 (17.0)	35.0 (13.8)	31.2 (12.3)	7.0 (2.8)	0.8 (0.3)	0.0 (0.0)	0.0 (0.0)	0.0 (0.0)	0.0 (0.0)	0.1 (0.0)	7.8 (3.1)	29.2 (11.5)	154.2 (60.7)
Average precipitation days (≥ 0.2 mm)	13.8	11.6	13.1	15.2	15.8	13.6	12.1	11.1	11.7	14.1	15.3	14.5	161.8
Average rainy days (≥ 0.2 mm)	8.5	6.5	10.2	14.1	15.7	13.6	12.1	11.1	11.7	14.1	14.5	10.8	142.7
Average snowy days (≥ 0.2 cm)	6.8	6.1	4.1	1.6	0.2	0.0	0.0	0.0	0.0	0.1	1.2	5.2	25.3
Mean monthly sunshine hours	109.5	127.2	142.8	156.6	193.3	220.7	235.2	226.6	180.5	157.8	107.4	105.2	1,962.5
Percentage possible sunshine	38.2	43.3	38.7	38.8	42.1	47.5	49.9	52.1	47.9	46.2	37.2	38.2	43.3
Average ultraviolet index	1	2	3	5	6	8	8	7	5	3	2	1	4
Source 1: Environment and Climate Change Canada (Sunshine data recorded at CFB Shearwater)
Source 2: Nova Scotian Institute of Science and Weather Atlas

Climate data for Halifax Stanfield International Airport WMO ID: 71395; coordinates 44°52′48″N 63°30′00″W; elevation: 145.4 m (477 ft); 1991−2020 normals, extremes 1953−present
Month	Jan	Feb	Mar	Apr	May	Jun	Jul	Aug	Sep	Oct	Nov	Dec	Year
Record high humidex	18.8	18.3	29.3	32.1	36.0	42.0	42.4	41.9	42.1	33.0	25.4	20.9	42.4
Record high °C (°F)	14.8 (58.6)	17.5 (63.5)	27.2 (81.0)	29.5 (85.1)	32.8 (91.0)	34.3 (93.7)	33.9 (93.0)	35.0 (95.0)	34.2 (93.6)	29.4 (84.9)	21.5 (70.7)	16.6 (61.9)	35.0 (95.0)
Mean maximum °C (°F)	9.6 (49.3)	9.0 (48.2)	12.3 (54.1)	17.7 (63.9)	24.2 (75.6)	28.0 (82.4)	29.5 (85.1)	29.0 (84.2)	26.7 (80.1)	21.5 (70.7)	16.4 (61.5)	12.3 (54.1)	31.0 (87.8)
Mean daily maximum °C (°F)	−1.2 (29.8)	−0.6 (30.9)	3.5 (38.3)	9.2 (48.6)	15.5 (59.9)	20.5 (68.9)	24.2 (75.6)	24.2 (75.6)	20.0 (68.0)	13.7 (56.7)	7.6 (45.7)	2.1 (35.8)	11.6 (52.9)
Daily mean °C (°F)	−5.7 (21.7)	−5.2 (22.6)	−0.9 (30.4)	4.5 (40.1)	10.1 (50.2)	15.2 (59.4)	19.2 (66.6)	19.2 (66.6)	15.2 (59.4)	9.2 (48.6)	3.8 (38.8)	−1.9 (28.6)	6.9 (44.4)
Mean daily minimum °C (°F)	−10.1 (13.8)	−9.7 (14.5)	−5.4 (22.3)	−0.3 (31.5)	4.6 (40.3)	9.8 (49.6)	14.2 (57.6)	14.1 (57.4)	10.2 (50.4)	4.7 (40.5)	0.0 (32.0)	−5.8 (21.6)	2.2 (36.0)
Mean minimum °C (°F)	−17.9 (−0.2)	−17.4 (0.7)	−12.8 (9.0)	−4.9 (23.2)	0.6 (33.1)	5.3 (41.5)	10.5 (50.9)	10.3 (50.5)	5.0 (41.0)	−0.3 (31.5)	−6.2 (20.8)	−12.9 (8.8)	−19.2 (−2.6)
Record low °C (°F)	−28.5 (−19.3)	−27.3 (−17.1)	−22.4 (−8.3)	−12.8 (9.0)	−4.4 (24.1)	−0.8 (30.6)	6.1 (43.0)	4.4 (39.9)	−0.8 (30.6)	−6.7 (19.9)	−13.1 (8.4)	−23.3 (−9.9)	−28.5 (−19.3)
Record low wind chill	−40.4	−41.1	−33.9	−24.4	−10.6	−4.0	0.0	0.0	−3.0	−10.1	−23.9	−35.6	−41.1
Average precipitation mm (inches)	125.9 (4.96)	111.0 (4.37)	120.2 (4.73)	106.4 (4.19)	109.7 (4.32)	89.8 (3.54)	86.7 (3.41)	90.5 (3.56)	107.3 (4.22)	139.8 (5.50)	159.1 (6.26)	146.9 (5.78)	1,393.3 (54.85)
Average rainfall mm (inches)	78.6 (3.09)	70.7 (2.78)	89.0 (3.50)	90.4 (3.56)	108.2 (4.26)	89.8 (3.54)	86.7 (3.41)	90.5 (3.56)	107.3 (4.22)	139.2 (5.48)	145.4 (5.72)	106.8 (4.20)	1,202.4 (47.34)
Average snowfall cm (inches)	53.9 (21.2)	44.3 (17.4)	34.4 (13.5)	16.6 (6.5)	2.1 (0.8)	0.0 (0.0)	0.0 (0.0)	0.0 (0.0)	0.0 (0.0)	0.6 (0.2)	19.4 (7.6)	44.1 (17.4)	215.2 (84.7)
Average precipitation days (≥ 0.2 mm)	18.7	15.2	14.6	14.6	13.5	12.2	11.0	10.8	10.1	12.8	14.6	16.9	164.8
Average rainy days (≥ 0.2 mm)	8.0	6.2	8.7	12.0	13.1	12.2	11.0	10.8	10.1	12.8	12.5	9.8	127.4
Average snowy days (≥ 0.2 cm)	14.4	12.1	8.8	5.3	0.6	0.0	0.0	0.0	0.0	0.2	3.7	11.0	56.0
Average relative humidity (%) (at 15:00 LST)	74.1	67.7	63.9	61.4	60.8	62.0	63.3	62.2	64.5	67.5	73.6	77.0	66.5
Average dew point °C (°F)	−6.9 (19.6)	−7.1 (19.2)	−4.5 (23.9)	−0.2 (31.6)	4.9 (40.8)	10.2 (50.4)	14.5 (58.1)	14.9 (58.8)	11.9 (53.4)	6.5 (43.7)	1.6 (34.9)	−3.1 (26.4)	3.6 (38.5)
Source 1: Environment and Climate Change Canada
Source 2: weatherstats.ca (for dewpoint and monthly & yearly average absolute maximum & minimum temperature)
