= Petroleum pricing in Nova Scotia =

Petroleum price regulations in Nova Scotia, Canada

Average gasoline prices by country.

Petroleum pricing in Nova Scotia is based on the Petroleum Products Pricing Act which governs the wholesale and minimum and maximum price of gasoline and diesel fuels that are authorized in Nova Scotia.

== History ==
In the spring of 2004, some consumers and an association representing some retailers (the Retail Gasoline Dealers Association of Nova Scotia) complained about the rising price of gasoline and diesel fuel, and the closure of rural gas stations due to low volumes and low margins. After appearing before an all party committee on petroleum pricing, the Nova Scotia legislature passed Bill 79 The Nova Scotia Petroleum Products Pricing Act. After a year of not proclaiming it law, Rodney MacDonald, the Premier of Nova Scotia announced in May 2006 that petroleum prices will be regulated, beginning on 1 July 2006, two weeks following New Brunswick's announcement of doing the same.

== Price Structure ==
The price of gasoline and diesel fuel are based on the price on the New York Mercantile Exchange as a benchmark in Canadian funds. This plus a 6 cent per litre wholesale margin, plus a transportation allowance of 0.5 to 2 cents per litre, and a retail margin of 4 to 5.5 cents per litre (or to a maximum of 7.5 cents per litre for full-serve gasoline).

=== Zones ===
The transportation of the product is calculated based on six zones in Nova Scotia:

- Zone 1 - Halifax Regional Municipality, Hants County and southern Colchester County - 0.5 cents per litre
- Zone 2 - Lunenburg, Kings and Eastern Annapolis counties, - 1 cent per litre.
- Zone 3 - Western Annapolis, Digby, Yarmouth, Shelburne, and Queens counties - 1.4 cents per litre.
- Zone 4 - Cumberland County - 1.5 cents per litre
- Zone 5 - Northern Colchester, Pictou, Antigonish, and Guysborough counties, and the Port Hastings - Port Hawkesbury area of Inverness County - 1.5 cents per litre.
- Zone 6 - the remainder of Inverness County, Richmond County, Victoria County, and Cape Breton Regional Municipality - 2 cents per litre.

=== Taxes ===
- Federal Excise Tax - 10 cents for Gasoline 6 Cents for Diesel
- Nova Scotia Road Tax - 15.5 cents
- Harmonized Sales Tax 14% of the total of the above (about 3 cents per 20 cents per litre)

== Notice ==
There is no notice of change in prices. Every Friday, prices may go up or down or stay the same, depending on the market price over the past 7 days.

== Interrupter and Price Changes ==
Scheduled price changes occur every second Thursday starting 13 July 2006. The interrupter is based on a formula that will determine whether the market prices of fuels have changed enough to warrant a price change . This “interrupter” formula will run every second Wednesday beginning 19 July 2006. For the interrupter formula to trigger a price change, a 5-day average NYMEX spot price from the last price change to the current date, will be calculated. If this new average NYMEX spot price changes by ±4 cents per litre over the last NYMEX spot price average, used to set the scheduled price change, the pump price may be adjusted using the new average NYMEX spot price as the baseline. If the interrupter is not triggered on the interruption date, the current pump price will continue until the next price change the following Thursday. In extreme circumstances, precipitated by a weather or perhaps a geopolitical event, a catastrophic interrupter could initiated whereby international product prices change by significant amounts, say ±15 cents per litre. This interrupter would be initiated on the day of the price change or the next day when rack prices in Nova Scotia would change.

== Controversy ==
Many critics argue that this method of controlling the price of petroleum products is not in the public interest; these critics include the Liberal Party of Nova Scotia, the Nova Scotia Chambers of Commerce, and vocal critics, mainly in the Halifax Regional Municipality, from the public at large. When this was first brought about many including in the New Democratic Party and the Retail Gasoline Dealers Association of Nova Scotia wanted a system similar to Prince Edward Island for lower prices. The ones opposing this scheme argued that the PEI system not only keeps prices higher but it does not allow for competition. The lower gasoline prices are a result of PEI's not charging the Provincial Sales Tax of 10% unlike in Nova Scotia where the Harmonized Sales Tax of 14% is charged. In New Brunswick, the HST is also charged, but they set a maximum price for most of entire province (no zones) without setting a minimum price. As a price comparison, on 1 July 2006, the same day Nova Scotia started its system, the maximum price in New Brunswick was 112.4 cents per litre for regular self serve compared to Nova Scotia's minimum price of 113.3 to 115.2 (depending on the zone) cents per litre.
