= Maritime Air Charter =

Canadian charter airline

Maritime Air Charter Limited

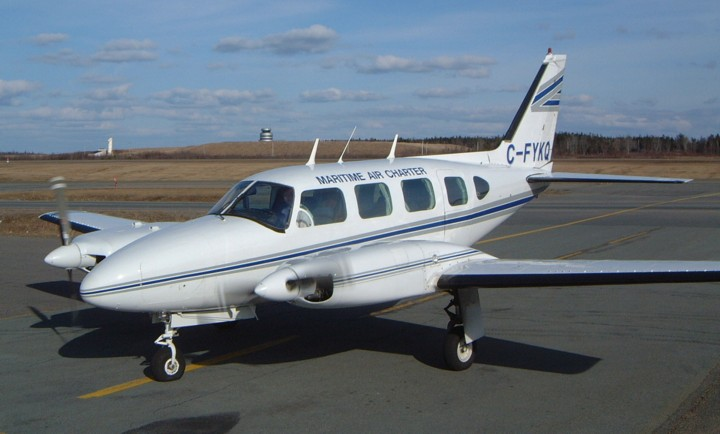
- A formerly owned Piper PA-31 Navajo
IATA	ICAO	Call sign
-	-	-
- Founded: 1996
- AOC #: Canada: 10413; United States: M39F739F
- Hubs: Halifax Stanfield International Airport
- Fleet size: 1
- Destinations: continental North America, Greenland
- Headquarters: Enfield, Nova Scotia
- Website: http://www.maritimeair.com

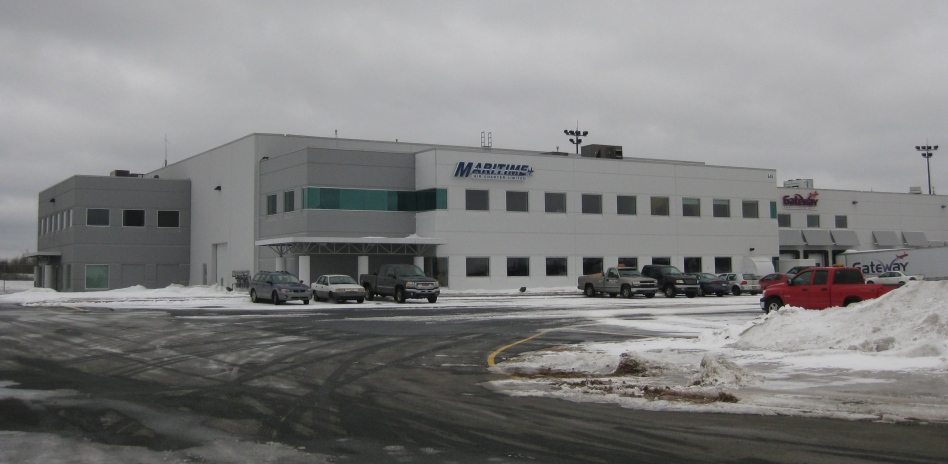
Maritime Air Charter hangar

Maritime Air Charter Limited is an on-demand aircraft charter company based at Halifax Stanfield International Airport in Enfield and Halifax Regional Municipality, Canada. It operates passenger and cargo services.

== History ==
Maritime Air Charter Limited began operations in July 1996 with a Piper Navajo and has had several fleet changes throughout the years, including operation of three PA-31 aircraft, a BN-2 Islander, and a BE10 King Air 100. It currently operates a Beechcraft 200 King Air purchased in 2012, C-GUND.

== Fleet ==
As of September 18, the Maritime Air Charter fleet is a Super King Air 200.
