= North Shore (Nova Scotia) =

Coordinates: 45.6°N 62.7°W

North Shore, Nova Scotia Northern Nova Scotia
- Economic Region
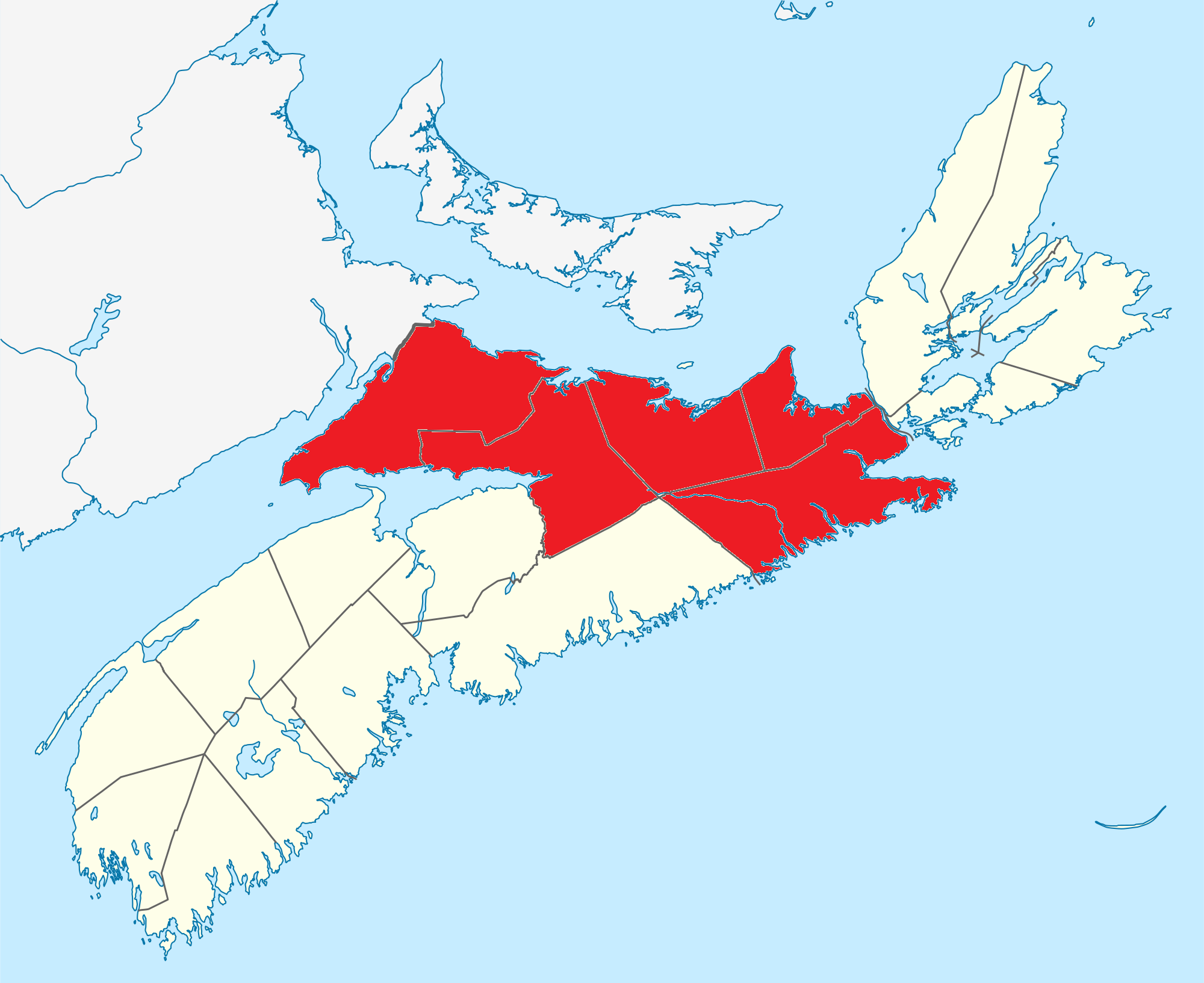
- The North Shore region as defined by Statistics Canada
- Interactive map of North Shore, Nova Scotia
- Country: Canada
- Province: Nova Scotia
- Counties: Antigonish County; Colchester County; Cumberland County; Guysborough County; Pictou County

Area
  - Land: 16,254.41 km^{2} (6,275.86 sq mi)

Population (2021)
  - Total: 153,173
  - Density: 9.4/km^{2} (24/sq mi)
  - Change 2016-21: ▲1.3%
- Time zone: UTC-4 (AST)
  - Summer (DST): UTC-3 (ADT)
- Area code: 902
- Dwellings: 81,453

The North Shore is a region of Nova Scotia, Canada. Although it has no formal identity and is variously defined by geographic, county and other political boundaries, it is defined by Statistics Canada as an economic region, composed of Antigonish County, Colchester County, Cumberland County, Guysborough County, and Pictou County.
