= Dover, Nova Scotia =

Community in Nova Scotia, Canada

Coordinates: 45.2864°N 61.0468°W

Dover in Nova Scotia

Dover is an unincorporated community in the Canadian province of Nova Scotia, located in Guysborough County. It is 7 km (4.3 mi) southwest of Canso and approximately 210 km (130 mi) northeast of Halifax.

== Parks ==
- Black Duck Cove Provincial Park
