= List of population centres in Nova Scotia =

A population centre, in Canadian census data, is a populated place, or a cluster of interrelated populated places, which meets the demographic characteristics of an urban area, having a population of at least 1,000 people and a population density of no fewer than 400 persons per square km^{2}.

The term was first introduced in the Canada 2011 Census; prior to that, Statistics Canada used the term urban area.

In the 2021 Census of Population, Statistics Canada listed 37 population centres in the province of Nova Scotia.

== List ==
The below table is a list of those population centres in Nova Scotia from the 2021 Census of Population as designated, named, and delineated by Statistics Canada.

Rank	Population centre	Size group	Population (2021)	Population (2016)	Change	Land area		Population density	
Rank	Population centre	Size group	Population (2021)	Population (2016)	Change	km^{2}	sq mi	/km^{2}	/sq mi
1	Halifax	Large urban	348,634	317,334	+9.9%	238.29	92.00	1,463.1	3,789
2	Cape Breton - Sydney	Medium	30,960	30,170	+2.6%	30.91	11.93	1,001.6	2,594
3	Truro	Small	23,583	23,205	+1.6%	31.52	12.17	748.2	1,938
4	New Glasgow	Small	19,316	19,137	+0.9%	29.82	11.51	647.8	1,678
5	Glace Bay	Small	16,915	17,604	−3.9%	31.19	12.04	542.3	1,405
6	Kentville	Small	14,905	14,449	+3.2%	27.98	10.80	532.7	1,380
7	Sydney Mines	Small	12,353	12,823	−3.7%	18.11	6.99	682.1	1,767
8	Amherst	Small	9,548	9,550	0.0%	12.38	4.78	771.2	1,997
9	Bridgewater	Small	8,790	8,532	+3.0%	13.63	5.26	644.9	1,670
10	Yarmouth	Small	7,848	7,527	+4.3%	16.81	6.49	466.9	1,209
11	Kingston - Greenwood	Small	7,118	6,879	+3.5%	17.22	6.65	413.4	1,071
12	New Waterford	Small	6,723	7,416	−9.3%	9.23	3.56	728.4	1,887
13	Enfield - Lantz	Small	6,583	6,807	−3.3%	11.67	4.51	564.1	1,461
14	Antigonish	Small	5,620	5,079	+10.7%	5.88	2.27	955.8	2,476
15	Windsor	Small	5,514	5,248	+5.1%	10.56	4.08	522.2	1,352
16	Wolfville	Small	5,057	4,195	+20.5%	6.46	2.49	782.8	2,027
17	Still Water Lake	Small	3,379	3,447	−2.0%	8.23	3.18	410.6	1,063
18	Port Hawkesbury	Small	2,998	3,004	−0.2%	5	1.9	599.6	1,553
19	Springhill	Small	2,654	2,743	−3.2%	4.84	1.87	548.3	1,420
20	Pictou	Small	2,643	2,711	−2.5%	4.35	1.68	607.6	1,574
21	Eskasoni 3	Small	2,575	2,352	+9.5%	5.7	2.2	451.8	1,170
22	Liverpool	Small	2,546	2,549	−0.1%	3.59	1.39	709.2	1,837
23	Berwick	Small	2,455	2,517	−2.5%	4.31	1.66	569.6	1,475
24	Lunenburg	Small	2,405	2,262	+6.3%	3.35	1.29	717.9	1,859
25	Lake Echo	Small	2,365	2,515	−6.0%	4.76	1.84	496.8	1,287
26	Indian Brook 14	Small	2,332	655	+256.0%	3.89	1.50	599.5	1,553
27	Digby	Small	2,001	2,060	−2.9%	3.16	1.22	633.2	1,640
28	Hantsport	Small	1,542	1,560	−1.2%	2.89	1.12	533.6	1,382
29	Brookside	Small	1,439	1,441	−0.1%	2.81	1.08	512.1	1,326
30	Shelburne	Small	1,439	1,483	−3.0%	2.6	1.0	553.5	1,434
31	Middleton	Small	1,429	1,391	+2.7%	2.72	1.05	525.4	1,361
32	Chester	Small	1,371	1,362	+0.7%	3.23	1.25	424.5	1,099
33	Inverness	Small	1,228	1,248	−1.6%	2.73	1.05	449.8	1,165
34	Centreville	Small	1,159	1,129	+2.7%	2.36	0.91	491.1	1,272
35	Howie Centre	Small	1,106	1,157	−4.4%	1.67	0.64	662.3	1,715
36	Hayes Subdivision	Small	1,044	1,121	−6.9%	1.1	0.42	949.1	2,458
37	Port Williams	Small	1,030	1,120	−8.0%	1.92	0.74	536.5	1,390

== See also ==
- List of the largest population centres in Canada
