= Uranium mining in Nova Scotia =

History of mining in Canadian province

The Canadian province of Nova Scotia has been known to hold significant uranium deposits as early as the 1950s, with the largest uranium deposit in the Maritimes located in South Mountain. Mining companies invested heavily in exploration for uranium between 1976 and 1981, before the province placed a moratorium on the practice through a cabinet policy statement. Following exploration undertaken near Windsor Forks in 2008, the province enacted a legislative ban on uranium exploration in 2009.

The provincial government under Tim Houston repealed the ban on uranium exploration in 2025, sparking public opposition. A request for proposals for uranium exploration at three sites in the province did not receive any applications.

== Geology ==
=== Background ===
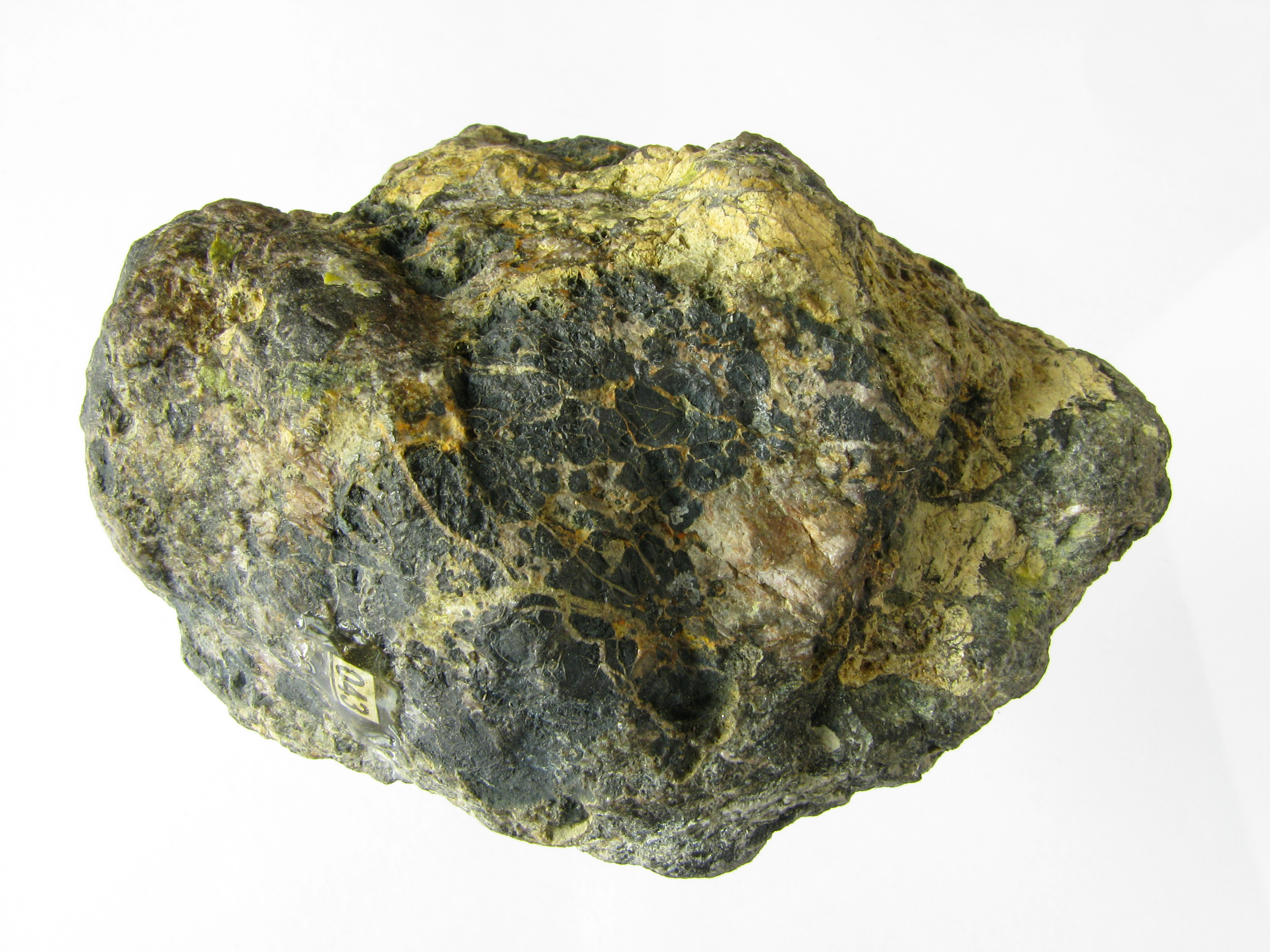
Uranium is a radioactive metal which combines with oxygen to form uraninite, also known as pitchblende

Uranium is a silvery-white radioactive metal. It typically combines with oxygen to form uraninite, also known as pitchblende; or triuranium octoxide. Uranium is measured in parts per million (ppm), with the Earth's crust containing roughly 2.8 ppm of uranium on average. Uranium ore deposits are described as high grade at 20,000 ppm, low grade at 1,000 ppm, and very low grade at 100 ppm. The economic viability of extraction can vary widely based on grade, tonnage, location, method of mining, and other factors.

Uranium produces a high amount of energy when processed in a nuclear reactor, making it a valuable resource for generating electricity. Uranium is also used as a fuel source to power ships and submarines, and in other small-scale applications.

=== Uranium in Nova Scotia ===
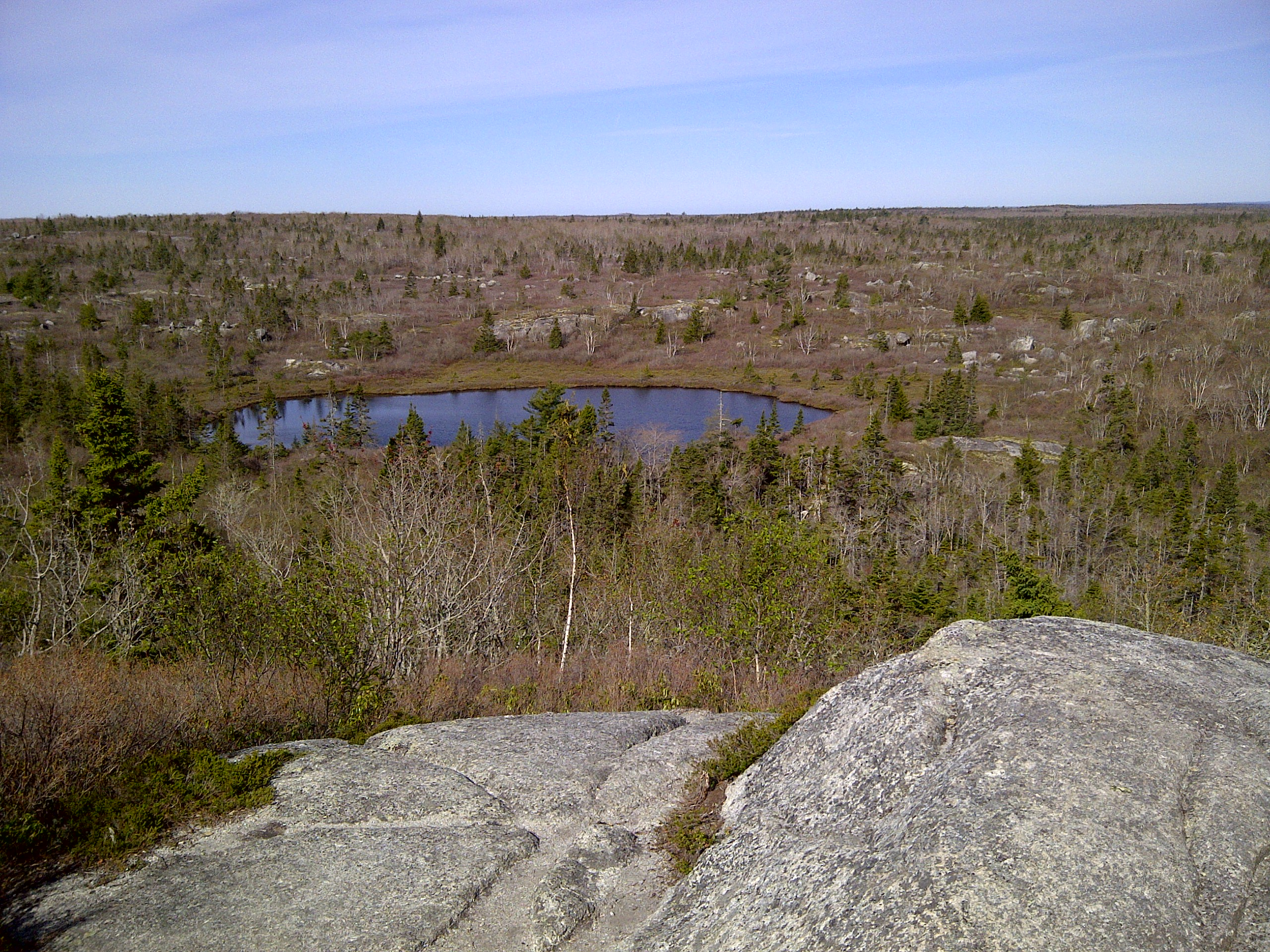
The largest uranium deposit in the Maritimes is the Millet Brook Deposit in South Mountain

Abnormal levels of uranium, radium, and radon have been detected in the Horton Group and the basement of Atlantic Canada as early as the 1950s. The South Mountain Batholith is known to have uranium deposits in the granitoid rocks of the area. The largest and most well-documented uranium deposit in the Maritimes is the Millet Brook Deposit in South Mountain, containing 450,000 kg (990,000 lb) of triuranium octoxide, as well as copper and silver.

Uranium commonly occurs in Nova Scotia as a natural contaminant in groundwater. A 2018 review of four decades of research on uranium in water wells in the province determined the contamination to be geogenic in origin, and that drilled wells had a significantly higher chance of uranium contamination than dug wells.

== History ==
=== Early exploration and ban on uranium mining (1976–2009) ===
Significant uranium exploration took place in Nova Scotia between 1976 and 1981, with companies such as Shell Canada, Gulf Minerals, and Esso Minerals investing in exploration in the province. Lacana, Gulf Minerals, and Noranda claimed a large area in the sedimentary basins near Pugwash and Tatamagouche, while Getty Minerals claimed land in the North Mountain region of the Annapolis Valley. In 1976, uranium mineralization was discovered at McLean Point near Pugwash during Lacana's regional exploration efforts, resulting in increased exploration in subsequent years. Exploration activities by Getty Minerals in North Mountain were unsuccessful, with the company ceasing operations in the area by 1978. In 1981, the provincial government under John Buchanan placed a moratorium on further uranium exploration, in the form of a cabinet policy statement.

In 1982, the government held 44 public meetings on the topic as part of a public inquiry led by Judge Robert McCleave, releasing a report in 1985 which affirmed the moratorium. A committee to reexamine uranium exploration was formed in 1985, producing a report in 1994 which recommended removing the moratorium on uranium exploration. The recommendation was not acted upon.

On 1 April 2008, the Vancouver-based Capella Resources announced the results of their exploration near Windsor Forks, declaring findings of 100ppm of uranium at the site. The announcement specifically noted that the moratorium on uranium mining was not bound by provincial legislation. In response to public pressure, the province effected a ban on uranium exploration and mining in 2009.

=== Committee ruling (2019) ===
The issue was revisited by the province's Standing Committee on Natural Resources and Economic Development in 2019. Proponents of uranium mining, such as the Mining Association of Nova Scotia, claimed that the ban on uranium exploration was preventing economic development in the province in rural areas. The Mining Association claimed that the ban was a political decision not based on science. The committee ruled to assert the province's support for the ban, in respect to "significant public concern about the risks of uranium mining, resulting in recommendations by the 1985 inquiry to issue a moratorium on the industry and subsequent legislation by the NDP government in 2009."

=== Repeal of the ban on uranium mining (2025) ===
In February 2025, the Progressive Conservative government under Tim Houston expressed interest in revisiting uranium exploration and mining in the province. Houston said in an interview with The Chronicle Herald that the technology and safety practices around uranium mining had changed, and that it was time for a "proper discussion" on the issue. Houston and the Energy Minister Trevor Boudreau stated that Nova Scotia depends on imported energy resources, but does not allow development of its own.

The provincial government of Nova Scotia repealed the ban on uranium exploration on 25 March 2025, saying in a statement that "the aim is to allow for research and to support industry to pursue new opportunities." On 14 May 2025, the province amended its critical minerals list to include uranium and issued a request for proposals for uranium exploration in areas with known deposits. Other critical minerals added to the list include tellurium, high purity silica, and silver.

The three sites highlighted for uranium exploration were Louisville, in Pictou County; East Dalhousie, in Annapolis County; and Millet Brook, in Hants County. Municipal governments for each county expressed surprise at the announcement, with councillors from West Hants Regional Municipality unanimously voting to request that the province pause issuing any leases for uranium exploration in Hants County until the issue could be further examined. The Municipality of Pictou County also requested a pause. The premier's office responded to the municipalities with a letter stating that the government remained committed to resource development. Houston later noted that "if municipalities want more investment, they must allow for more economic development". Joan Baxter of the Halifax Examiner described the letter to municipalities as containing "thinly-veiled threats". Mi'kmaq groups in the province such as the Sipekne'katik First Nation demanded that the province re-instate the ban, stating the decision was made without consultation with First Nations groups. Other groups in the province issued statements in opposition to uranium exploration, such as the Canadian Association of Physicians for the Environment and the Nova Scotia Federation of Labour.

The province's request for proposals for uranium exploration did not result in any applications by the deadline of 11 June 2025. The Mining Association of Nova Scotia attributed the lack of interest to the enduring effects of the ban on exploration, stating that the mining industry still viewed the province as closed to mining. Erin Adlakha, the Chair of Geology at Dalhousie University, blamed the lack of interest on poor timing. She stated that the four-week deadline was too short for mineral exploration companies to make a decision, adding that many of them likely had already planned summer exploration work elsewhere. Derek Mombourquette, the interim leader of the Nova Scotia Liberal Party, criticized the Houston government for rushing to lift the uranium ban. Mombourquette echoed concerns regarding lack of consultation, stating that the province failed to consult with municipalities and the Mi'kmaq.

The geologist and activist Brad Redden claimed that the provincial government of Nova Scotia is unable to properly regulate mining and forestry, stating that "environment falls off the plate". Redden spoke at a gathering in River John on 5 June 2025, where he described the Nova Scotia Department of Natural Resources as "more a facilitator of industry than a regulator of industry", referring to the 1992 Westray Mine disaster caused by lack of oversight by government regulators. Redden, a former municipal councillor and deputy warden of Annapolis County, stated that he received a geology degree from Saint Mary's University and spent three years working in the mining industry but did not have a professional geologist designation. Redden subsequently received a call on 23 June from Stephen Olmstead, the registrar and CEO of Geoscientists Nova Scotia, warning him that complaints had been made regarding his comments at the gathering. The call was followed up with a letter the next day stating that there were "public concerns" with Redden's presentation regarding "the subsequent media coverage relative to mineral exploration on the basis that while you may have training in geology (unconfirmed), you are not currently registered as a professional geoscientist under Nova Scotia's Geoscience Profession Act." Redden and other citizens opposed to uranium mining subsequently formed a new non-profit group, Safe and Responsible Resource Development.

Following the lack of interest by mineral exploration companies, the province began their own research at the Millet Brook site. A statement from the Department of Natural Resources said the research would not involve any digging or drilling, and the department would be examining existing records and core samples while they "consider other next steps". A landowner in Vaughan claimed that he received a telephone call from the MLA for West Hants Melissa Sheehy-Richard on 19 June 2025, requesting access to his private road for the provincial government for the purpose of uranium exploration. The Premier's office denied that the call took place.

On 3 October 2025, a 7,000-signature petition was tabled in the Nova Scotia Legislature calling for the ban on uranium mining and exploration to be reinstated.

== Economic and political influence ==
=== Tariffs ===
The decision to repeal the ban on uranium was influenced by the threat of tariffs imposed by the second Trump administration in 2025. The Houston government views development of uranium and other natural resources as a method of decreasing the province's dependence on imported energy and equalization payments.

== Regulatory environment ==
Uranium mining in Canada is regulated by the Canadian Nuclear Safety Commission, the federal regulator of nuclear power and materials. Every province and territory is responsible for monitoring and developing their own regulations for uranium exploration.

To undertake mineral exploration for uranium in Nova Scotia, a company must receive an exploration license from the Department of Natural Resources and other permits. Companies may conduct non-disturbance operations, such as examining rocks and soil, without a permit. Companies may also survey land from the air with permission from the department.

== See also ==
- Gold mining in Nova Scotia
- List of mines in Nova Scotia
- List of uranium projects
