= Midland Railway (Canada) =

Midland Railway Company

Overview
- Headquarters: Truro, Nova Scotia
- Reporting mark: MRC
- Locale: Nova Scotia, Canada
- Dates of operation: 1898–1983
- Successor: Dominion Atlantic Railway 1905-1983

Technical
- Track gauge: 4 ft 8 1/2 in (1,435 mm) standard gauge
- Length: 57.84 mi (93.08 km)

Midland Railway was a Nova Scotian railway company formed in 1896 to build a railway through Hants County, Nova Scotia, connecting Truro to Windsor. Completed in 1901, it operated independently until 1905 when it became part of the Dominion Atlantic Railway and later the Canadian Pacific Railway, until the line closed in 1983.

== Route ==
The railway's route ran 93.08 kilometres (57.84 mi) following a series of gently curving river valleys, beginning with the St. Croix River near Windsor then following the Kennetcook River and Five Mile River to the Shubenacadie River and across to Black Rock, Clifton and following the lower reaches of the Salmon River to Truro. Beginning in Truro, the railway went through the communities of Clifton, Princeport, South Maitland, Kennetcook, Clarksville Stanley, Mosherville, and Scotch Village, Brooklyn, Mantua and ended in Windsor. A number of private gypsum spurs connected to the Midland near Windsor and Mantua.

== History ==
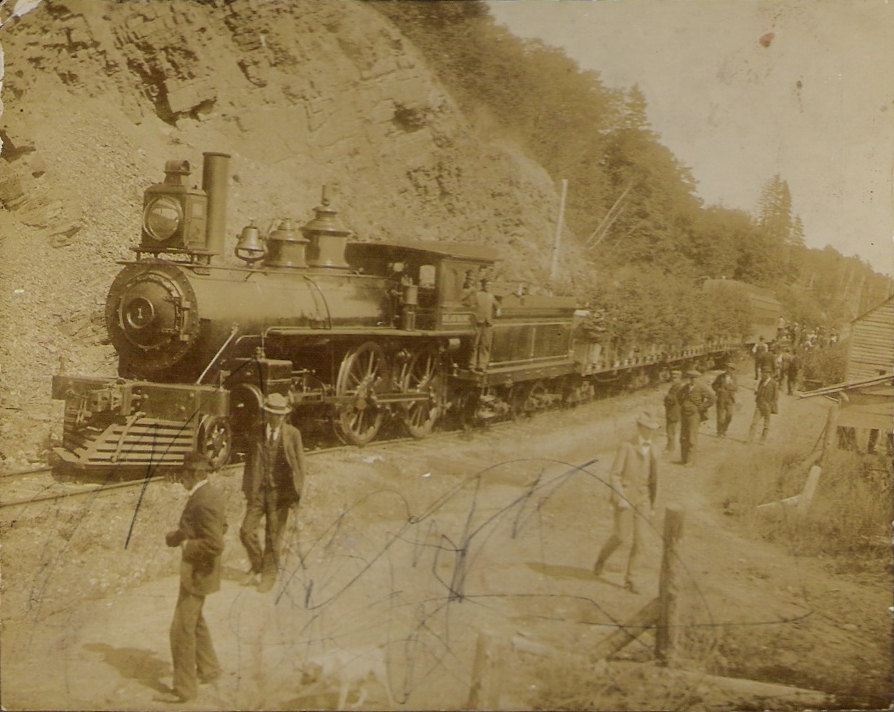
Midland Railway Company (MRC) Locomotive No. 1 on construction site of South Maitland Bridge (1900)

Chartered by the province of Nova Scotia, the railway received subsidies from the federal government and the town of Truro. Construction started on the railway in 1898. The Midland constructed the massive South Maitland Bridge over the Shubenacadie River. On September 7, 1901 the Midland Railway opened its line across Hants County. One of the primary reasons for the railway was to export farm produce, lumber and rich gypsum deposits out of the county.

In 1905, the Dominion Atlantic Railway purchased the Midland line renaming it the Truro Subdivision, however, it continued to be commonly called the "Midland Line". The Dominion Atlantic made extensive use of the Midland Line as a shortcut to move freight bound for other parts of North America to Truro. This allowed the Dominion Atlantic, a subsidiary of the Canadian Pacific Railway to save distance, time and congestion from having to route freight through the city of Halifax. The Midland's easy grades and gentle curvatures made it easy to handle large amounts of freight. The line was busiest during World War Two when in addition to heavy freight traffic, it delivered supplies and personnel to the training air fields at the Stanley Airport and Maitland. Traffic dwindled due to subsidized highway construction after World War Two, although the line became well known among railway historians for offering one of Canada's last mixed train, a passenger and freight train combined, which ran with vintage passenger equipment until passenger service ended on the Midland in 1979. The last through train on the line was June 20, 1983, although a short portion of the western end of the Midland remained in use serving gypsum mines until 2001.

== Tourism and popular culture ==
Today portions of the Midland Railway roadbed are used as footpaths and ATV trails. A section of the roadbed near the Shubenacadie River bridge at South Maitland was developed in 2006 by the Fundy Tidal Interpretive Centre" as an interpretive walking trail which uses one of the remaining abutments of the railway's Shubenacadie River bridge as a lookoff. The Midland Railway is featured in a Stan Rogers song on his 1976 Fogarty's Cove album entitled "Rawdon Hills" which wistfully recounts the hopes and legends of the short-lived Rawdon Hills gold rush which briefly brought a rush of development to communities along the Midland Railway.
