= Canada (1891 ship) =

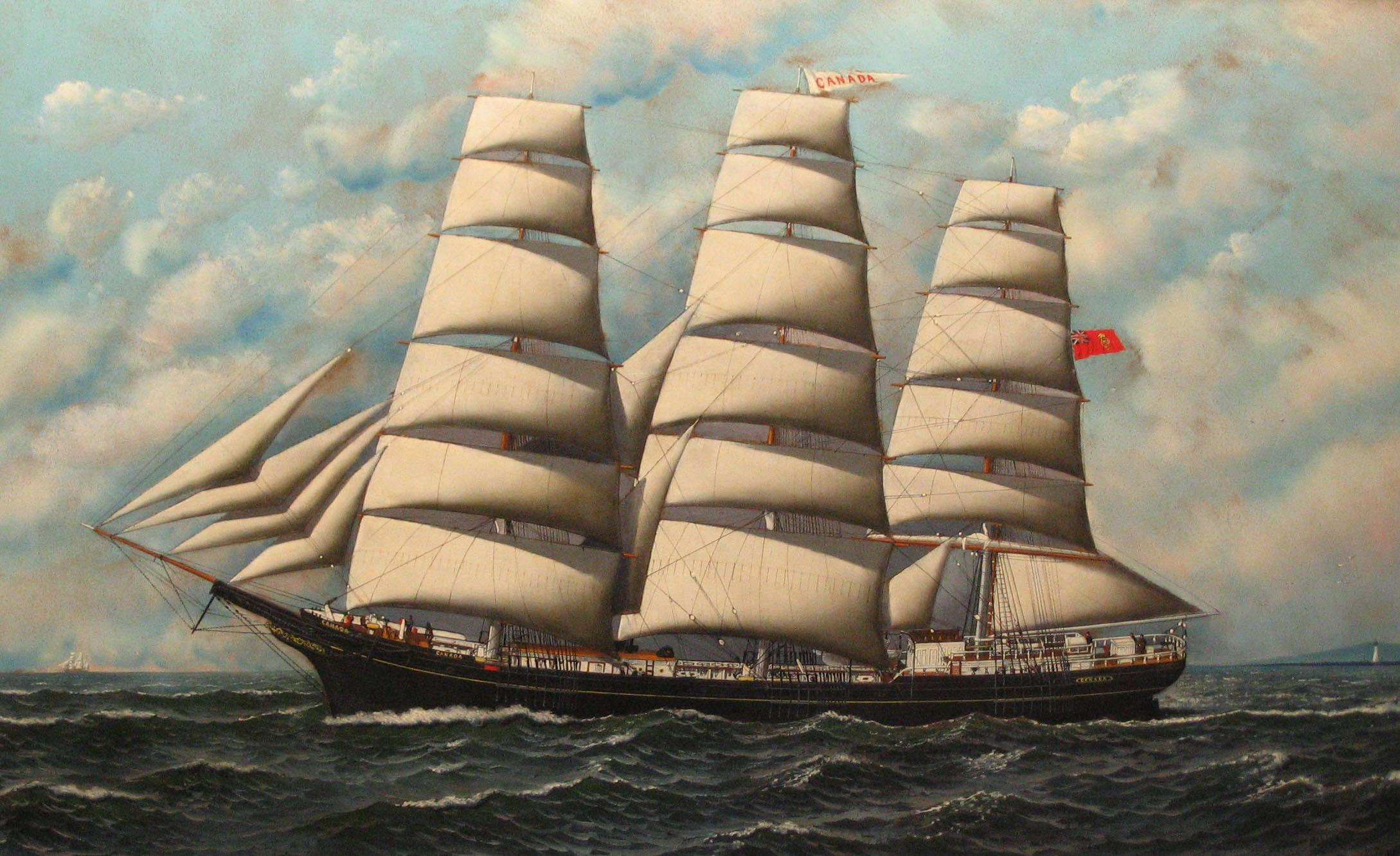
- Portrait of the ship Canada painted by Antonio Jacobsen, circa 1895

History

Canada
- Name: Canada
- Owner: Charles Rufus Burgess, Wolfville, Nova Scotia
- Port of registry: Windsor, Nova Scotia, Official Number 100262
- Builder: C.R. Burgess Yard, Kingsport, Nova Scotia
- Launched: 6 July 1891
- Maiden voyage: 1 September 1891
- Identification: Code Letters MHWF
- Fate: Broken up, Portland, Maine, 1926

General characteristics
- Tonnage: 2,301 GRT
- Length: 257 ft (78 m) between perpendiculars; 275 ft (84 m) sparred length
- Beam: 45 ft (14 m)
- Depth: 26 ft 6 in (8.08 m)
- Decks: 2
- Propulsion: Sail
- Sail plan: Full-rigged ship
- Crew: 18 men, 4 boys, 3 officers

Canada was a full-rigged ship built in 1891 at Kingsport, Nova Scotia on the Minas Basin and was the largest sailing ship operated in Canada when launched in 1891. Canada was built and owned by Charles Rufus Burgess of nearby Wolfville, Nova Scotia. Despite the decline in wooden shipbuilding, Burgess saw that there was still potential for very large wooden sailing ships to make profits in the twilight days of the wooden sailing ship era. He had built the barque Kings County, the previous year, the largest four-masted barque ever built in Canada. Burgess planned to make Canada to be the largest sailing ship ever built in Canada, but damage, during harvesting, to a timber intended for the keel caused her length to be trimmed by ten feet making Canada slightly smaller than the ship William D. Lawrence built in 1874. However, as the William D. Lawrence had been sold to Norwegian owners and renamed in 1883, the ship Canada still claimed the honour of being the largest sailing ship under the Canadian flag at the time of her launch. Between 75 and 150 men were employed in building the ship. Canada was designed by master builder Ebenezer Cox who was in charge of the Burgess Shipyard in Kingsport where he had built ships since the 1860s and was regarded at the time to have built more ships than any man in Canada. The construction cost $111,000. Her interior included a finely outfitted captain's cabin, finished in walnut, ash and rosewood with a full dining room, office and bathroom. Her launch at noon on July 6, 1891 attracted 5,000 people from all across Western Nova Scotia, brought by multiple special trains run by the Cornwallis Valley Railway. It was regarded as the biggest event in the history of the village. A tug took the completed hull of Canada from the launch at Kingsport to Saint John, New Brunswick where the masting, rigging and outfitting was completed at the Customs House Wharf. Her immense size attracted hundreds to the Saint John waterfront to see Canada depart on September 1, 1891 for her maiden voyage, carrying with a cargo of lumber worth $144,109 bound for Liverpool, England. Classed A1 by Lloyd's Register for 14 years, Canada made several fast passages between South America and Australia. However by 1900, the ship was facing stiff competition for cargoes from the growing numbers of general cargo steamships. Canada was converted to a gypsum barge in 1910, carrying gypsum from Windsor, Nova Scotia to Staten Island, New York for the Gypsum Transportation Company of New York. She was towed a final time from New York to Portland, Maine in 1926 where she was broken up.
