= Hillaton =

Community in Nova Scotia, Canada

Coordinates: 45°8′49.84″N 64°26′22.02″W

Hillaton in Nova Scotia

Hillaton is a community in the Canadian province of Nova Scotia, located in Kings County. Located near Canning, Nova Scotia, it was an important apple shipping location of the Cornwallis Valley Railway branchline of the Dominion Atlantic Railway.
