= South Maitland =

South Maitland may refer to:

- South Maitland, New South Wales, an Australian inner city suburb
- South Maitland, Nova Scotia, a Canadian unincorporated community
