= Sheffield Mills, Nova Scotia =

Community in Nova Scotia, Canada

Coordinates: 45°9′03.5″N 64°28′35.5″W

Sheffield Mills in Nova Scotia

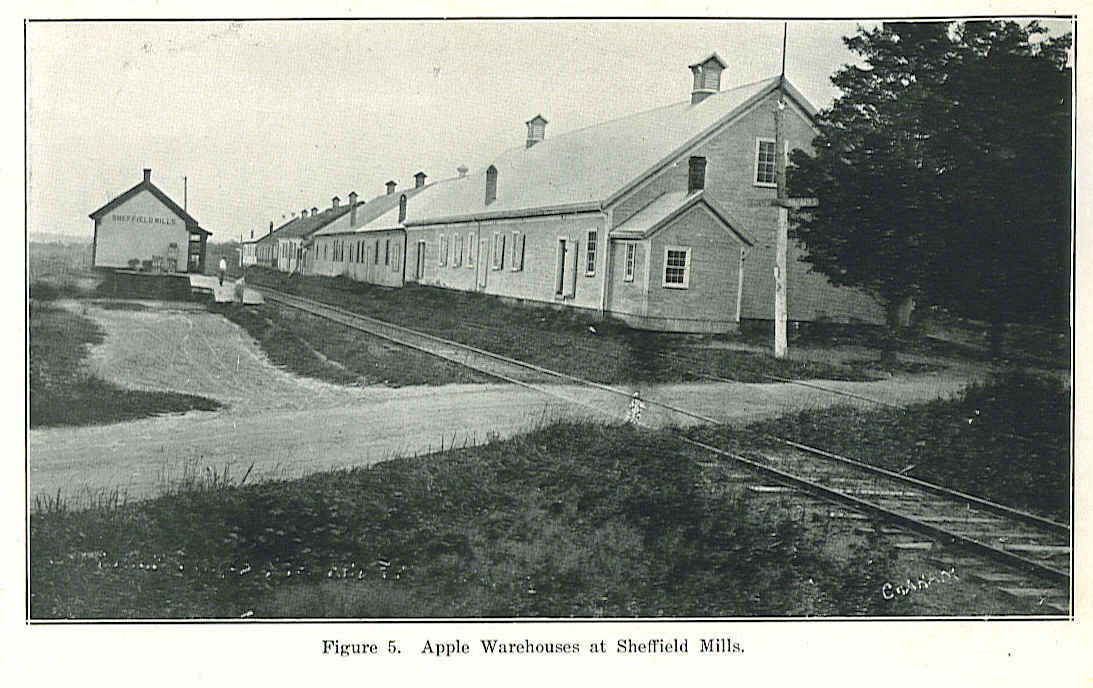
Sheffield Mills station and apple warehouses, circa 1931

Sheffield Mills is a rural farming community in the Canadian province of Nova Scotia, located in Kings County along Route 221 between Canning and Centreville. It was an important apple shipping location of the Cornwallis Valley Railway branchline of the Dominion Atlantic Railway. After the decline of Nova Scotia's apple industry in the 1950s, Sheffield Mills farmers diversified, with many setting up poultry farms. Discarded waste from poultry barns attracted large numbers of bald eagles to winter in the area in the 1980s which has led to an annual winter weekend of eagle spotting.
