= Flying Bluenose =

The Flying Bluenose was a Canadian luxury passenger train operated by the Dominion Atlantic Railway between Halifax, Nova Scotia and Yarmouth, Nova Scotia from 1891 to 1936. It was a boat train scheduled to connect with passenger steamships to Boston and ran only during the summer months.

== History ==
This summertime fast luxury train was the premier passenger service on the Dominion Atlantic Railway. It began in 1891 when the "missing gap" between Digby and Annapolis Royal was completed linking Halifax and Yarmouth by rail for the first time. This created an opportunity for a fast luxury service aimed at American tourists connecting Halifax with passenger steamers at Yarmouth. The name Flying Bluenose combined two earlier trains of the Windsor and Annapolis Railway, the Flying Acadian and the Bluenose.

Drumhead herald of the Flying Bluenose

The name was taken from an affectionate nickname for Nova Scotians and predated the name of the famous racing schooner Bluenose by many years. The Dominion Atlantic purchased the first Pullman parlour cars in all of Canada, the "Haligonian" and "Mayflower" for the run. After the Canadian Pacific Railway purchased the Dominion Atlantic in 1912, buffet observation cars were added, carrying the Dominion Atlantic's "land of Evangeline" herald on drumheads. The train successfully tapped a growing tourism market from New England and was an immediate success. It was joined by the New Yorker in the 1920s, a similar fast summer-only train which connected to New York steamships at Yarmouth. Famous in its day, the Flying Bluenose inspired the author Zillah K. Macdonald to write a children's book The Bluenose Express in 1928 personalizing the train's adventures in a style that predated the famous Thomas the Tank Engine characters created by British railway enthusiast Rev. Wilbert Awdry in 1942. A steep decline in travel during the Great Depression eroded the market for the Flying Bluenose and it was cancelled about 1936. Equipment and services were transferred to the Dominion Atlantic's daily fast passenger trains which continued many of the traditions of the Flying Bluenose such as open observation cars, fresh Digby scallops and flower arrangements from the Grand Pre memorial gardens. VIA Rail's Evangeline Dayliner maintained the route of the Flying Bluenose until 1989, minus the luxurious elements of the older train.

== Route ==
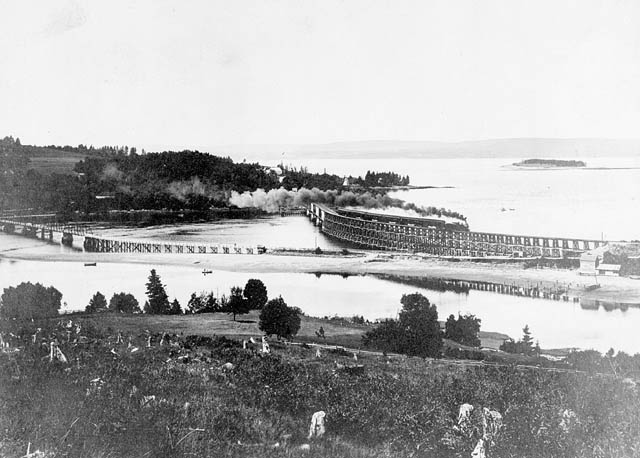
The Flying Bluenose crossing a Dominion Atlantic Railway bridge in 1906.

The Flying Bluenose ran through Nova Scotia's scenic Annapolis Valley offering many fine views of the Annapolis Basin, Minas Basin and Cape Blomidon. It crossed several large tidal rivers. The train connected to fast passenger steamers at Yarmouth but also the DAR ferries at Digby to Saint John, New Brunswick such as SS Princess Helene and the MV Kipawo ferry at Wolfville. In Halifax, it connected to ocean liners of various lines as well as the transcontinental trains of the Intercolonial Railway of Canada and later Canadian National Railway trains such as the Ocean Limited.
