= Skoda (barquentine) =

Canadian sailing vessel built in 1893

Skoda was a barquentine built in Kingsport, Nova Scotia in 1893 by shipbuilder Ebenezer Cox, marking the end of an era as the last vessel built by Cox and the last large vessel built in Kingsport.

== Background ==
Skoda, a 658-ton barquentine, was built in Kingsport, Nova Scotia, designed by veteran master shipbuilder Ebenezer Cox. The barquentine marked the end of his thirty-year shipbuilding career, and was also the last deep sea vessel built and launched in Kingsport, bringing the shipbuilding era to a close at a yard that built some of the largest sailing ships in Canada.

Skoda was commissioned for C. Rufus Burgess of Wolfville, Nova Scotia, who was the largest builder and owner of ships in the area. The vessel was named a patent medicine factory in Wolfville, also owned by Burgess. Skoda was launched on June 1, 1893. She loaded lumber at nearby Parrsboro after the launch for a maiden voaye to the west of England.

== Shipbuilder ==
In his time, Ebenezer Thomas Cox (b. 19 Dec 1828, d. 8 Sept 1916) was one of the leading shipbuilders. He spent thirty years as designer and master builder at the shipyard in Kingsport. He built thirty ships during this span, with his ships averaging at 1,000 tons each. Cox died in Kingsport, Nova Scotia in 1916 at the age of eighty-eight years.

== Later Use ==
Burgess owned the barquentine until 1900 when the Barquentine Skoda Company, Limited of Wolfville, Nova Scotia took ownership. In 1912, the Skoda was sold to Lester Ashley Rodden of Mobile, Alabama and was registered at that port in 1915.
