= South Maitland, Nova Scotia =

Community in Nova Scotia, Canada

South Maitland
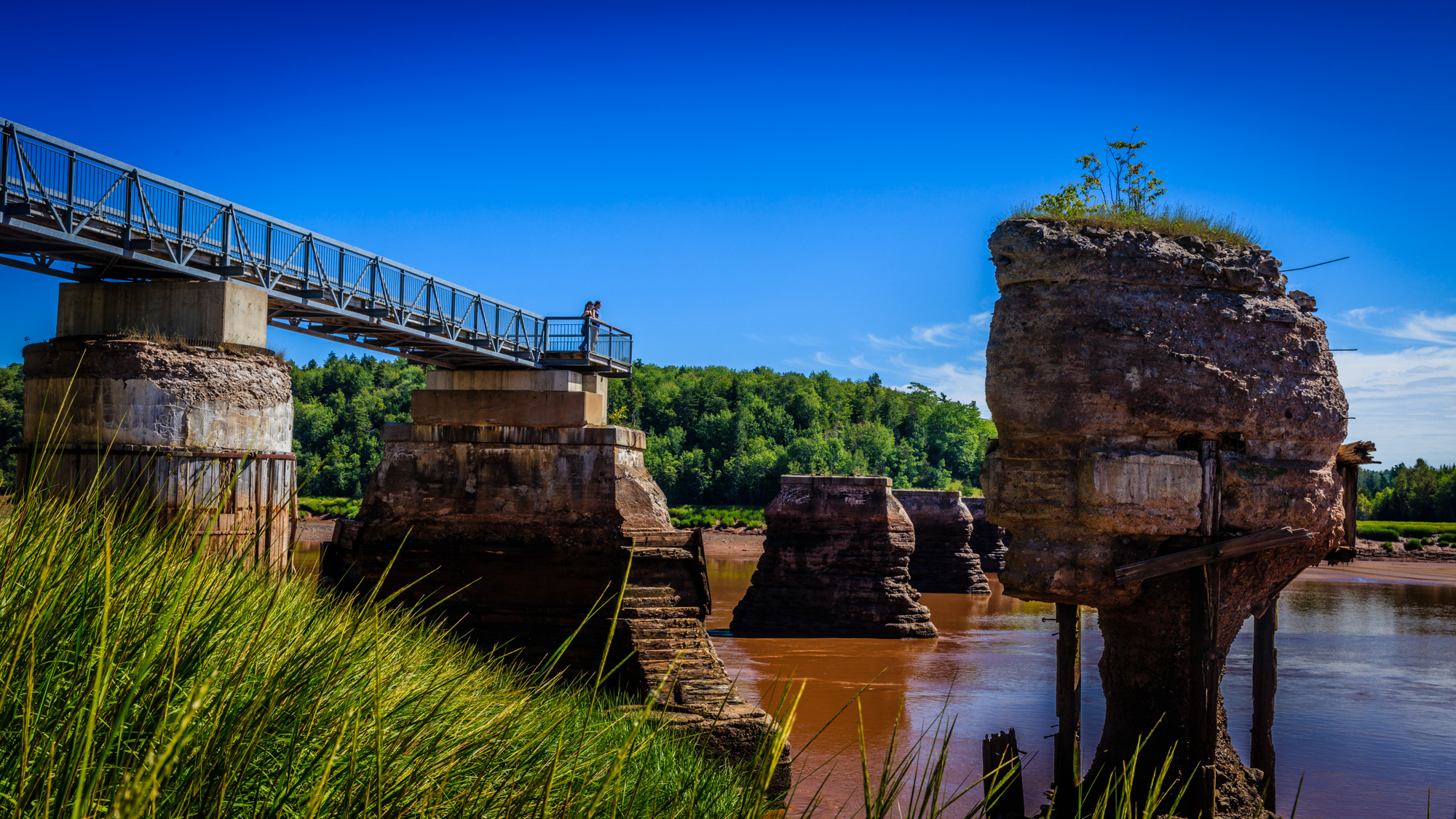
- Observation Deck at Fundy Tidal Interpretive Centre

- Location in Nova Scotia
- Coordinates: 45°15′13″N 63°28′22″W
- Country: Canada
- Province: Nova Scotia
- County: Hants County
- Municipality: East Hants Municipality
- Time zone: UTC-4 (AST)
  - Summer (DST): UTC-3 (ADT)
- Canadian Postal Code: B0N
- Area code: 902
- Telephone Exchange: 883
- NTS Map: 011E06
- GNBC Code: CBJRA

South Maitland is an unincorporated community in the Canadian province of Nova Scotia, located in East Hants Municipality in Hants County. The community was one of the stops on the Shubenacadie Canal system and the site of a number of 19th century shipyards including the yard that built the barque Calburga in 1890, the last large square rigger to sail under a Canadian flag. The village is best known for the historic bridge built over the Shubenacadie River by the Midland Railway, part of the Dominion Atlantic Railway in 1901. Demolished in the 1990s, a surviving abutment of the railway bridge was retrofitted in 2006 by the Fundy Tidal Interpretive Centre as a lookoff and walking trail showcasing the tides of the Shubenacadie River. A decommissioned railway caboose is also preserved beside the trail.

== See also ==
- Maitland, Nova Scotia
- Peregrine Maitland
