= Great Village =

Community in Nova Scotia, Canada

Coordinates: 45°24′59.07″N 63°35′59.63″W

Great_Village in Nova Scotia

Great Village is an unincorporated community in the Canadian province of Nova Scotia, located along the north shore of Cobequid Bay in Colchester County. The community includes the localities of Highland Village and Scrabble Hill.

== Settlement ==
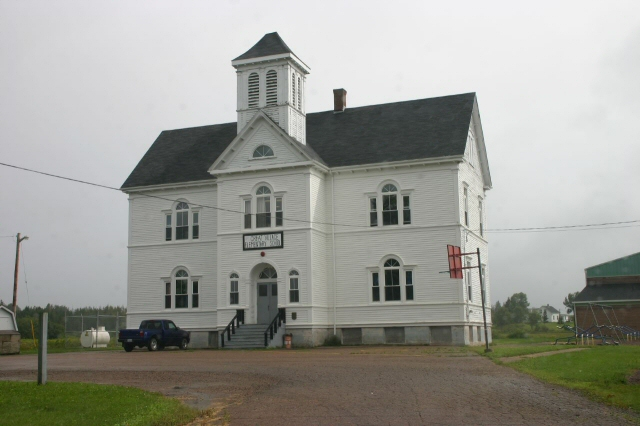
Great Village Elementary School

What was to become Great Village was first settled by French-speaking Acadians around 1630, who built dykes in the marshes, reclaimed land, and created a village called "Petit-Louis" or "Vil de Cadets". They were expelled, along with the rest of the Acadian population of Nova Scotia, by Governor Charles Lawrence in 1755. This event, known as the Expulsion of the Acadians, saw the Acadians dispersed among the American colonies, Louisiana, England and France. They left behind memorials in the names of nearby rivers (anglicised in modern times into Portapique and Debert).

The next settlers, whose descendants were to remain, came in the spring of 1762: Protestants of predominantly Ulster origins, brought over by former British Army Captain Alexander McNutt, himself an Ulsterman who had been stationed in Nova Scotia. Many of these settlers re-used the burnt-out storage cellars of the expelled Acadians as the foundations for their first homes.

"The vessel 'Hopewell' reached Halifax carrying Irish settlers on October 9, 1761, and landed passengers where they remained over the winter. Early next spring arrangements were made to hire a vessel to take these people to the 'District of Cobequid' where the best lands and greatest quantities of marsh in that part of the country were assigned to them, and furnished them with provisions out of the Provincial Funds. Many of these settlers took up land in what is now Londonderry district. Tradition is that twenty families located along the Bay Shore between Isgonish River and Bass River."

The original grants of land of the Township of Londonderry were prepared in 1765, but because of the British government's explicit prohibition against the granting of Nova Scotia land to Irish, they were not made official until February 10, 1775 (reference 3, page 39)

"The reader should bear in mind that the settlement of the township of Londonderry was for the most part on those lands near the Bay Shore--Masstown, Glenholme, Great Village, Portapique, and Bass River. The present community of Londonderry, or Acadia Mines, was not included in the Area described in the Grant of 1775. Presumably settlement of that community did not commence until iron ore was discovered there in 1847."

The Acadian settlers built dykes to create farmland from the area's extensive salt marsh. The village partially exists on this created land, which is still farmed. The dyked land is situated at a substantially lower elevation than the inhabited portion of Great Village. The dyke holds back the more than fifty-foot high tides of the Bay of Fundy.

In the early nineteenth century this village was called 'The Port of Londonderry' and was a Port of Registry." Several shipyards thrived in the late 19th century and along with lumber exports created the wealth which built many of the fine, large Victorian-period houses and gardens visible today around the village. Foremost among them was the shipbuilder John M. Blaikie who built a massive four-masted barque named after himself in 1885, the barque John M. Blaikie. Along with the barque Kings County built across the Minas Basin, John M. Blaikie was one of only two four masted barques ever built in Canada and among the largest wooden sailing vessels built in the country.

== Literary significance ==
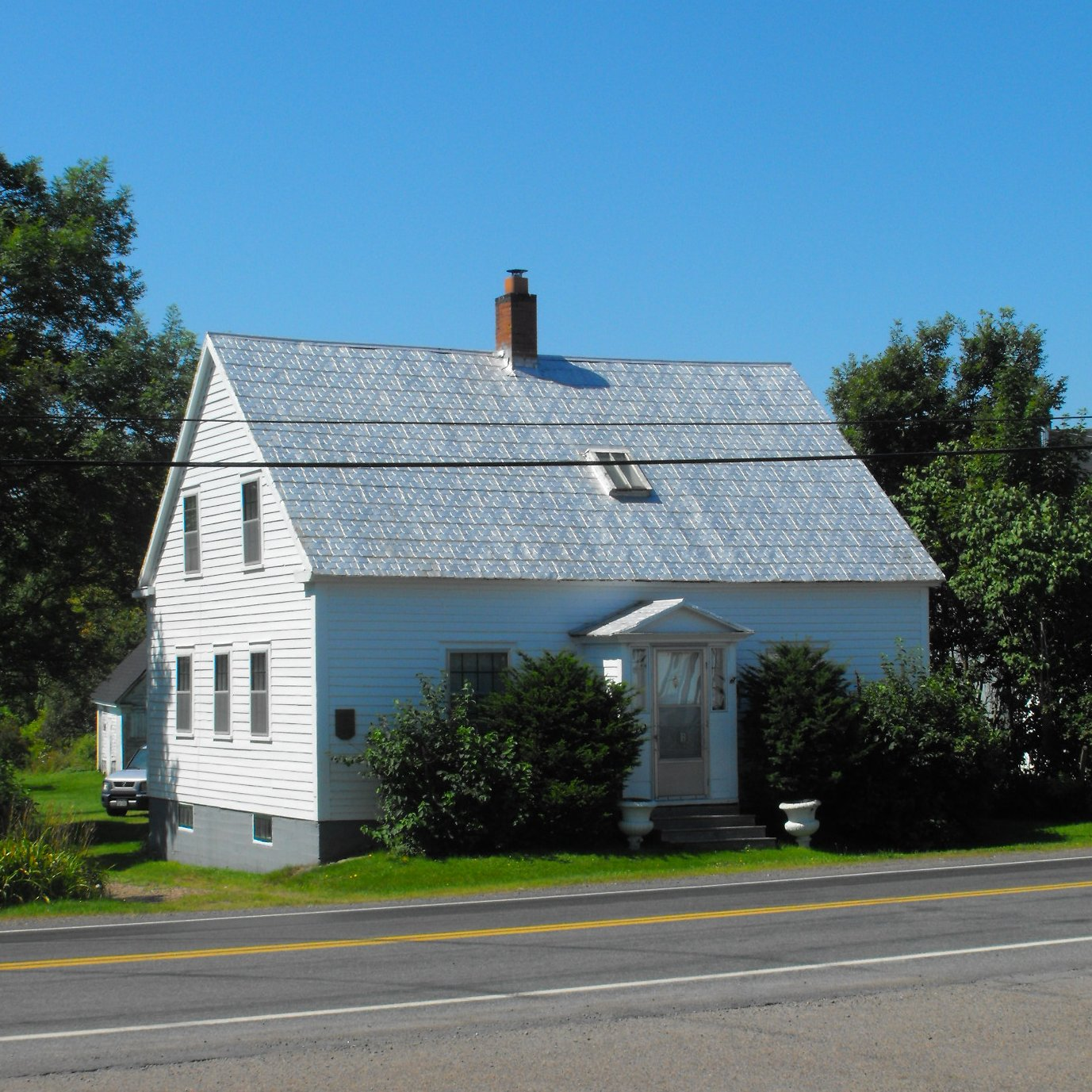
Elizabeth Bishop House

In her youth, the Pulitzer Prize-winning author Elizabeth Bishop lived with her grandparents, William Brown Bulmer and Elizabeth (Hutchinson) Bulmer, in Great Village. The Bulmer House, also known as the Elizabeth Bishop House, is an artists' retreat and is a Nova Scotia Provincially Recognized Heritage Site. Elizabeth Bishop based many of her stories on the life of a fictional village of the same name. One story is called appropriately, "In the Village".

== Notable residents ==
- George Wylie Hutchinson
- Elizabeth Bishop

== Mahon Cemetery ==
The Mahon Cemetery is Great Village's historic cemetery which is still in use today, Buried in it are many early settlers and their descendants including Elizabeth Bishop's grandparents and other relatives as well as many of the villagers who were portrayed in her poetry.
