= Evangeline (train) =

Canadian passenger train

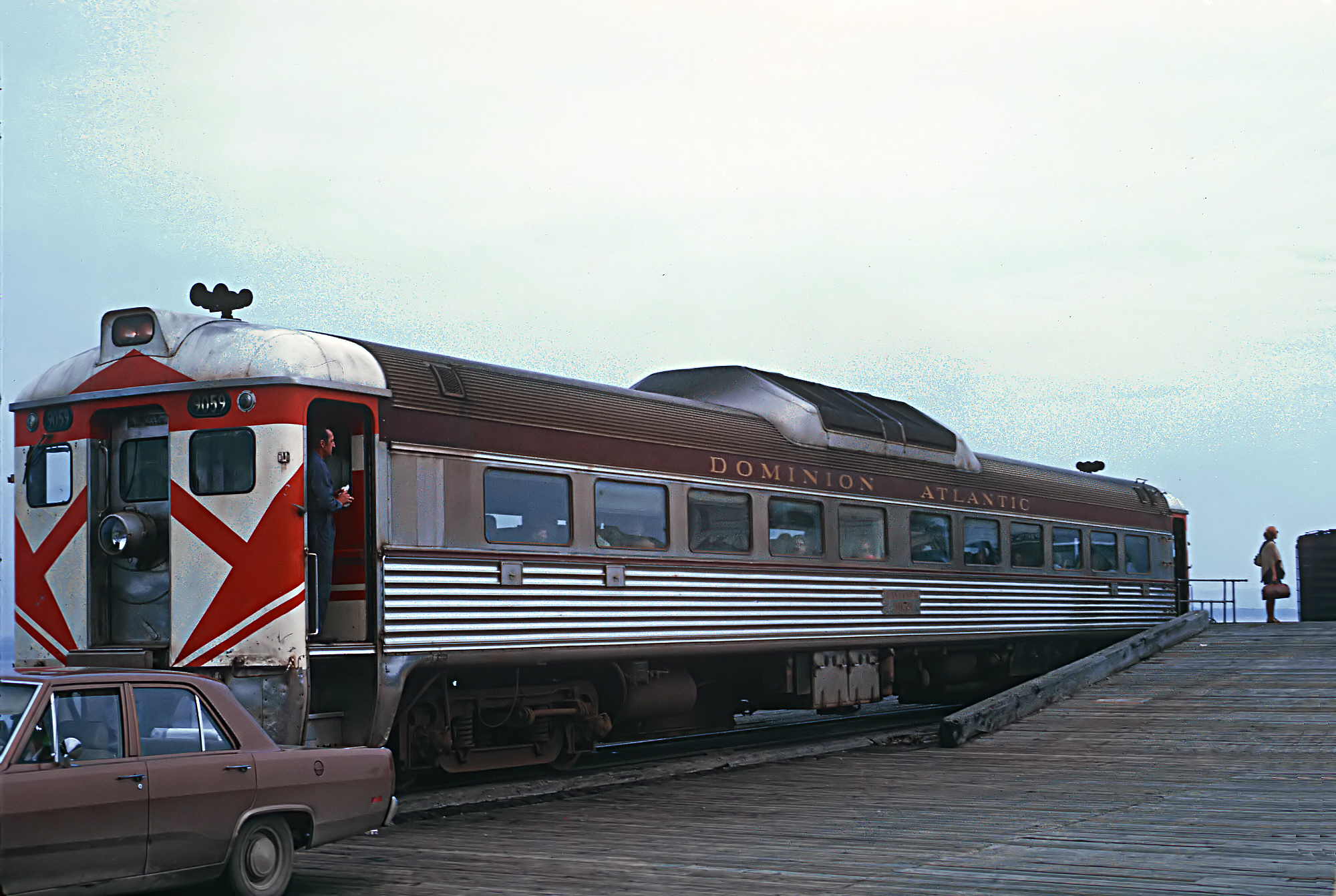
- The DAR's "Evangeline" meets the ferry at Digby, Nova Scotia, Sept. 5, 1970

Overview
- Service type: Inter-city rail
- Status: Discontinued
- Locale: Nova Scotia
- First service: August 1956
- Last service: January 14, 1990
- Former operator(s): Dominion Atlantic Railway; Via Rail

Route
- Termini: Halifax; Yarmouth
- Stops: 9 scheduled, 23 flag stops (1956); 29 flag stops (1988)
- Distance travelled: 346.2 km (215.1 mi)
- Average journey time: 6 hours
- Service frequency: Daily Except Sunday, later daily

Technical
- Rolling stock: Budd Rail Diesel Car, RDC-1 Model
- Track owner(s): CPR

The Evangeline was a passenger train operated from 1956 to 1990 by the Dominion Atlantic Railway and Via Rail Canada between Yarmouth, Nova Scotia and Halifax, Nova Scotia.

== Dominion Atlantic ==
The Evangeline Dayliner service was inaugurated by Canadian Pacific Railway's subsidiary the Dominion Atlantic Railway in 1956 upon receipt of two Budd Rail Diesel Cars, which replaced conventional trains. Canadian Pacific choose "Evangeline" as they wanted a prestige name for the new service drawing on the lore of Acadian history made famous by the poem Evangeline by Henry Wadsworth Longfellow, a longtime travel theme of the DAR. The Evangeline followed the route of previous DAR trains such as the Flying Bluenose. "Evangeline" was the promotional name for the route, while "Dayliner" was the name for the RDC equipment. Despite being operated by the DAR, their schedules were integrated with the entire CPR passenger system and made connections with CPR passenger/vehicle ferry service from Saint John, New Brunswick at Digby, as well as CNR passenger service at Middleton and Halifax and DAR's mixed freight/passenger service at Windsor. In the late 1960s, the "Evangeline" name became less promoted as Canadian Pacific lost interest in promoting passenger service. Users along the Annapolis Valley more commonly called the train "The Dayliner".

== Via Rail ==
Via Rail Canada took over CPR passenger service in 1978 and fully integrated operations in 1979. Via continued to operate the RDC equipment on the Halifax-Yarmouth route and revived the name Evangeline in 1983. Ridership quickly increased and the service was successful for several years, helped by the era's record-high gasoline prices.

Improvements to parallel Highway 101 and competing bus service led to Via considering the abandonment of the Evangeline during the mid-1980s but changes in the federal government placed a moratorium on abandonment for several years. Via altered the schedule and improved connections, resulting in quadrupling of passenger counts. Train lengths expanded from 1 car to as many as 4 cars at peak service.

Drastic cuts to Via Rail's funding in the 1989 federal budget saw Minister of Transport Benoît Bouchard authorize the abandonment of 55% of Via's service, including the Evangeline, effective January 15, 1990. The Via train had been the only user of the DAR rails west of Kentville to Yarmouth and CPR promptly abandoned the trackage in March 1990.
