= Weston, Nova Scotia =

Weston
- Community
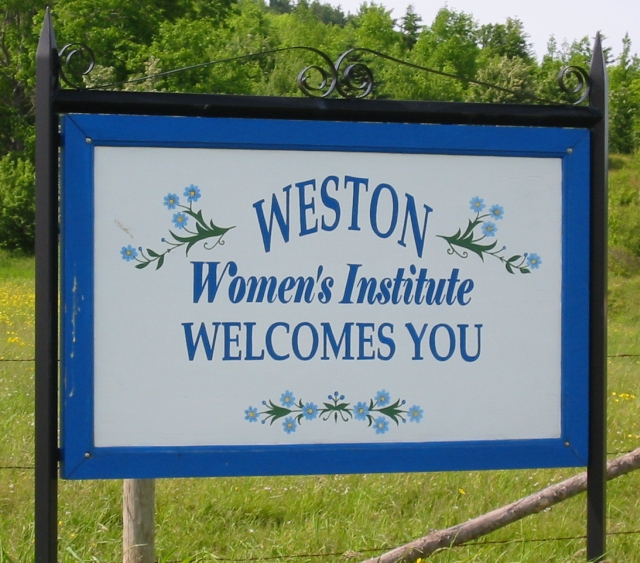
- Weston Welcome Sign

- Weston in Nova Scotia
- Coordinates: 45°3′29″N 64°47′30″W
- Country: Canada
- Province: Nova Scotia

Weston, Nova Scotia is a small community located in the central part of the Annapolis Valley. It is located about 3 miles (4.82 km) north-west of Berwick, Nova Scotia

The community is roughly bordered on the north by Route 221 (North Mountain), on the south by the 101 Highway (Berwick & Cariboo Bog), on the east by the Chute Road (west of the 360 Harbourville Road, Somerset), and on the west by Parker Brook (east of Victoria Road, Aylesford).

== History ==
Weston was named by its settlers on November 16, 1859 at a public meeting which was called for the purpose of naming the district. At the time it formed part of the Cornwallis Township which was established in 1761. Its name was likely chosen after a place in England however some have suggested that it is based on the fact the nearby settlers in Somerset would say "west on' when giving driving directions to the location.

Settlers were given grants of land by the Crown and cleared the forested land with which they built homes and barns. Early businesses in Weston were a cheese factory, a saw mill, a carriage factory, a tannery, and a box factory. Some of the first settlers were Tuppers, Loomers, Clems, and Woodworths. Others were Powers, Skinners, Sanfords, Wests, and Coxes.

=== Post Office ===
A post office was established in Weston on December 1, 1892 with Jonathan Sanford as its first postmaster. Mail was delivered from the Aylesford Post Office three times a week until 1912 when daily delivery was introduced. The post office officially closed on November 30, 1919 when rural mail deliver was instituted from the Aylesford Post Office.

=== North Mountain Railway ===
1929 map showing the NMR route between Centreville and Weston

In 1912 construction began by the Dominion Atlantic Railway on a 14.8 mile railway line to Weston from Centreville to improve transportation for local farming. On December 1, 1914 this Centreville to Weston Branch was inaugurated and was known as the North Mountain Railway, sometimes called the CVR. Weston was its western terminus. The railway triggered several local industries. Two apple warehouses and a station were built in Weston to pack and ship the large volume of apples produced in local orchards. A cooperage was also built beside the tracks with a basket-making mill just to the north. A large triangle of track called a wye was used to reverse trains which also included a small locomotive shed and water tank. Rail service lasted until 1961 when the North Mountain Line closed due to the rise of highways and truck traffic. The station was demolished in 1961, followed in later years by the apple warehouses, although the roadbed of the railway and wye can still be seen.

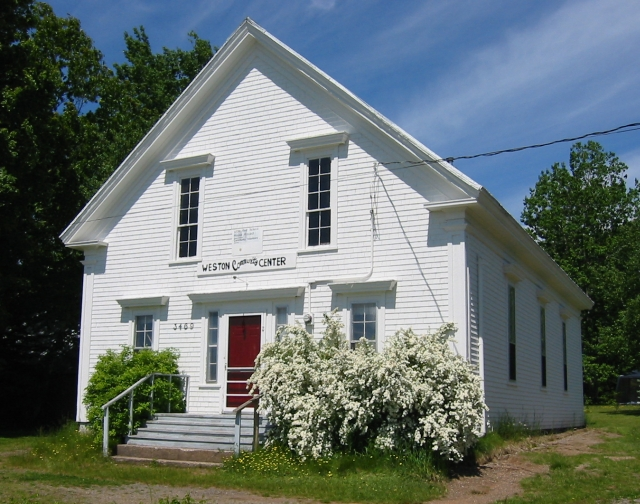
Weston Community Center.

=== Community Center ===
In 1885 John Skinner donated a piece of land for a Community Hall to be built on. On December 31, 1885 the first public meeting was held in the new Hall. The building was used for alternating Baptist and Methodist church services. In 1932 the Weston Branch of the Women's Institute was formed and has been a constant supporter of the hall. On July 14, 1985 the community celebrated the one hundredth anniversary of the center.

=== Schools ===
The first school of the community was built on what was then the Rand property. In 1863 when the free school law was passed a larger school was built at Weston Corner on what is now known as Power Hill. In 1876 the school was replaced again with a larger one farther north. This building also included an upstairs hall which was used until the current Community Center was built. Children today attend the elementary school in nearby Somerset.

=== Industries ===
With fertile soil, agriculture is the dominant industry, along with some rural tradespeople. In the late 1990s a controversial golf course was built on farmland in Weston, despite zoning laws which prohibited such developments to agricultural land. Despite widespread local opposition, it was later retroactively approved. In August 2007 the original developer of the golf course attempted to build a large condominium complex named Fury Farms beside the golf course which would destroy even more agricultural land, a move also opposed by a majority of local residents.
