= Digby Pines Golf Resort and Spa =

Hotel in Nova Scotia, Canada

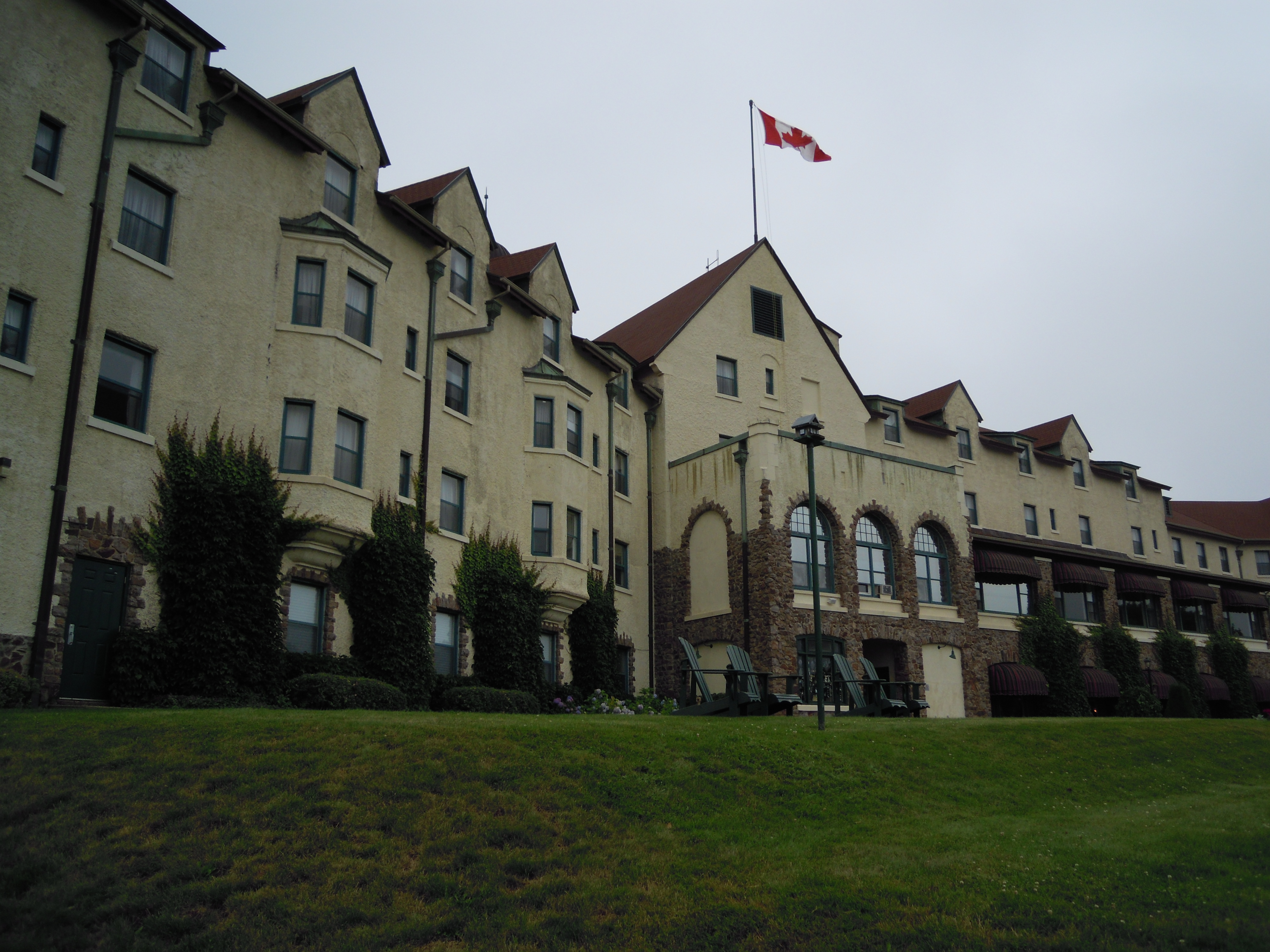
- Exterior of the hotel
- Interactive map of the Digby Pines Golf Resort and Spa area

General information
- Location: 103 Shore Road, Digby, NS B0V 1A0; Canada
- Coordinates: 44°38′3.4″N 65°45′38.2″W
- Opening: 1929
- Management: Pacrim Hospitality Services Inc

Technical details
- Floor count: 3

Other information
- Number of rooms: 147
- Number of suites: 6
- Number of restaurants: 2
- Parking: Complementary

Website
- www.digbypines.ca

The Digby Pines Golf Resort and Spa is a seasonal coastal resort hotel located at Digby, Nova Scotia, on the shores of the Annapolis Basin. The Digby Pines was owned by the Province of Nova Scotia until late in 2019, and was one of the province's three "Signature Resorts," along with Liscombe Lodge Resort and Conference Center in Liscombe Mills, and Keltic Lodge Resort and Spa in Ingonish Beach.

The Digby Pines first opened in 1905 as a large Second Empire wooden hotel built by Digby businessmen Harry Churchill. It was used in World War I as quarters for army officers. After the war, it was purchased by the Dominion Atlantic Railway and expanded as a seasonal resort to cater to the DAR's railway and steamer passengers. The film actress Theda Bara spent her honeymoon with husband Charles Brabin at The Pines in 1921. The DAR's owners, the Canadian Pacific Railway, decided to expand The Pines and replaced the original wooden hotel with the present building which opened on June 24, 1929.

The hotel was built in the style of a Norman Chateau, similar in style to Canadian Pacific's Algonquin Hotel in Saint Andrews, New Brunswick. The hotel includes a Stanley Thompson 18-hole golf course, a large landscaped outdoor heated pool, 30 cottages, and extensive grounds with views of the Annapolis Basin and Digby Gut. The golf course attracted visitors such as baseball player Babe Ruth. A fleet of buses and station wagons connected the hotel to the Digby railway station and the town's steamship wharf. Hotel bell boys once dipped the hotel flag twice a day to the Canadian Pacific steamship SS Princess Helene as she called on Digby. Canadian Pacific sold its Dominion Atlantic Railway hotels in 1957. The Pines was purchased by the Province of Nova Scotia to provide a regional tourism destination and is currently marketed as the "Digby Pines Golf Resort and Spa". In late 2019, the resort and golf club were sold to Halifax business owners Besim Halef and Glenn Squires and the Bear River First Nation.
