= Kings County (barque) =

Barque built in 1890

History

Canada
- Name: Kings County
- Owner: William Thompson, Saint John, New Brunswick
- Port of registry: Windsor, Nova Scotia
- Builder: C.R. Burgess Yard, Kingsport, Nova Scotia
- Launched: June 2, 1890
- Identification: Code Letters LWBF
- Fate: Wrecked 1911

General characteristics
- Tonnage: 2061 Gross Tons
- Length: 255 ft.
- Beam: 45 ft.
- Depth: 25 ft.
- Decks: 2
- Propulsion: Sail
- Sail plan: Four Masted Barque

Kings County was a four-masted barque built in 1890 at Kingsport, Nova Scotia on the Minas Basin. She was named to commemorate Kings County, Nova Scotia and represented the peak of the county's shipbuilding era. (A much smaller barque also named Kings County had been built in 1871.) Kings County was one of the largest wooden sailing vessels ever built in Canada and one of only two Canadian four-masted barques. (The other was the slightly smaller John M. Blaikie of Great Village, Nova Scotia.) At first registered as a four-masted full-rigged ship, she was quickly changed to a barque after her June 2 launch. More than three thousand people from Kings and Hants counties attended the launch. She survived a collision with an iceberg on an 1893 voyage to Swansea, Wales. Like many of the large wooden merchant ships built in Atlantic Canada, she spent most of her career far from home on trading voyages around the world. In 1909, she returned to the Minas Basin for a refit at Hantsport and loaded a large cargo of lumber. In 1911 she became the largest wooden ship to enter Havana Harbour when she delivered a cargo of lumber and was briefly stranded. She was lost a few months later on a voyage to Montevideo, Uruguay when she ran aground in the River Plate. Too damaged to repair, she was scrapped in Montevideo where her massive timbers were visible for many years.
