= Digby Gut =

Cannel connecting the Bay of Fundy and the Annapolis Basin

Coordinates: 44°40′35.5″N 65°45′32″W

Location in the Bay of Fundy
Digby Gut is an inlet that breaks through the line of the North Mountain Range at the north-east end of Digby Neck, and connects the Bay of Fundy with Annapolis Basin.

The Digby Gut (French: Canal Saint-Georges) is a narrow channel connecting the Bay of Fundy with the Annapolis Basin. The town of Digby, Nova Scotia is located on the inner portion of the western side of the Gut. The eastern entrance is marked by the Point Prim Lighthouse. Strong tidal currents, numerous rocky ledges, frequent fogs and unpredictable winds make it a dangerous passage requiring a pilot or local knowledge to navigate. Tide flows create 5 knot tidal currents and create numerous whirlpools and eddies.

The gut, technically referred to as a water gap, is about a half nautical mile in width and bordered by high rocky cliffs. It marks a break in the North Mountain ridge along the Annapolis Valley and is the eastern end of Digby Neck. Digby Gut had its origins as the northern terminus of the ancient Bear River, part of which is now a drowned river valley.

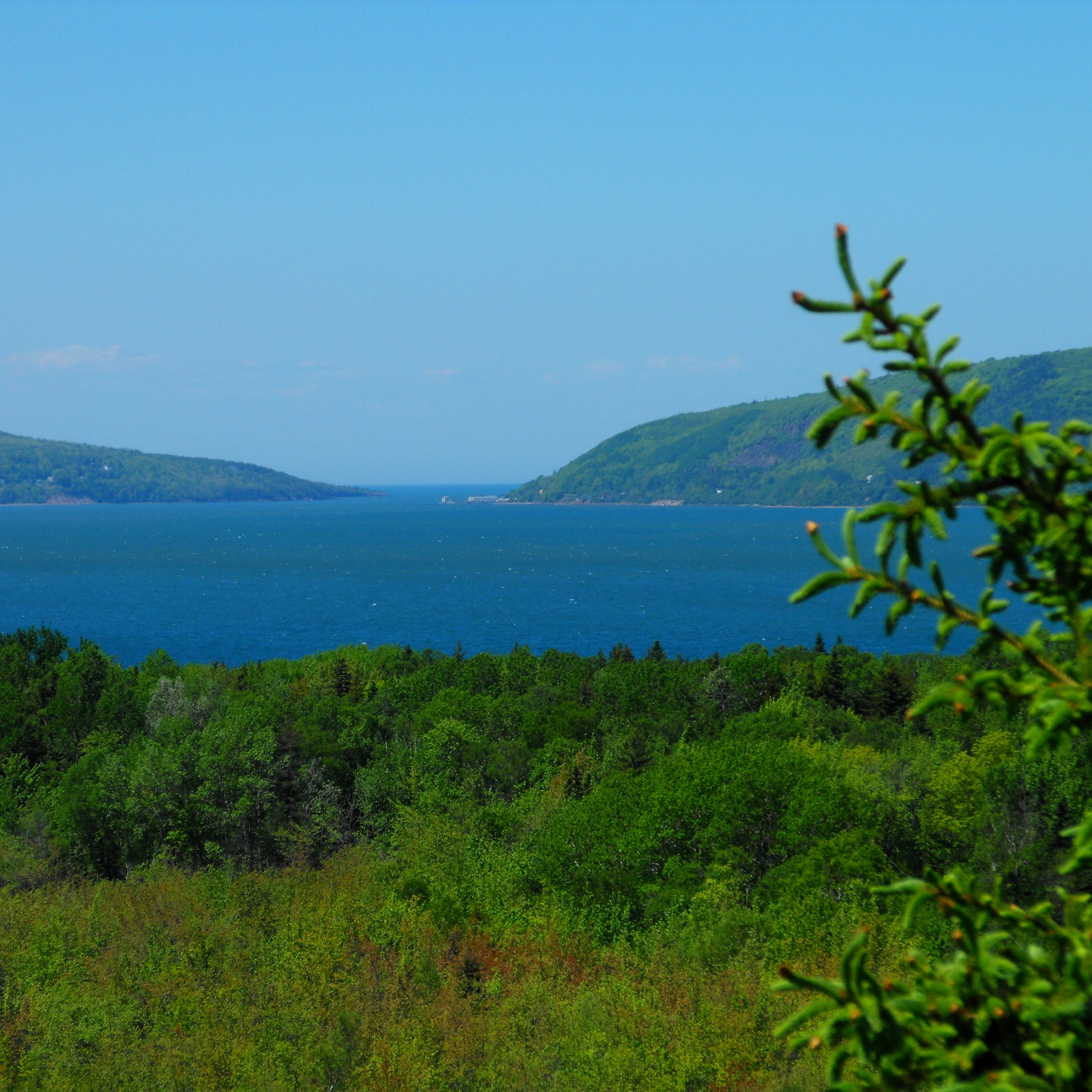
Digby Gut is the outlet to the Bay of Fundy for the Annapolis Basin.

Digby Gut is overlooked by the Digby Pines Resort and has been used daily for many years by Digby-Saint John ferries such as the SS Princess Helene and MV Princess of Acadia. The famous poet Bliss Carman wrote a classic Canadian poem of courage about a fearless twelve-year-old sailor who single-handedly sailed a schooner through Digby Gut during a storm, entitled "Arnold, Master of the Scud".
