= Elizabeth Bishop House =

Historic house in Nova Scotia, Canada

Coordinates: 45.4165°N 63.5996°W

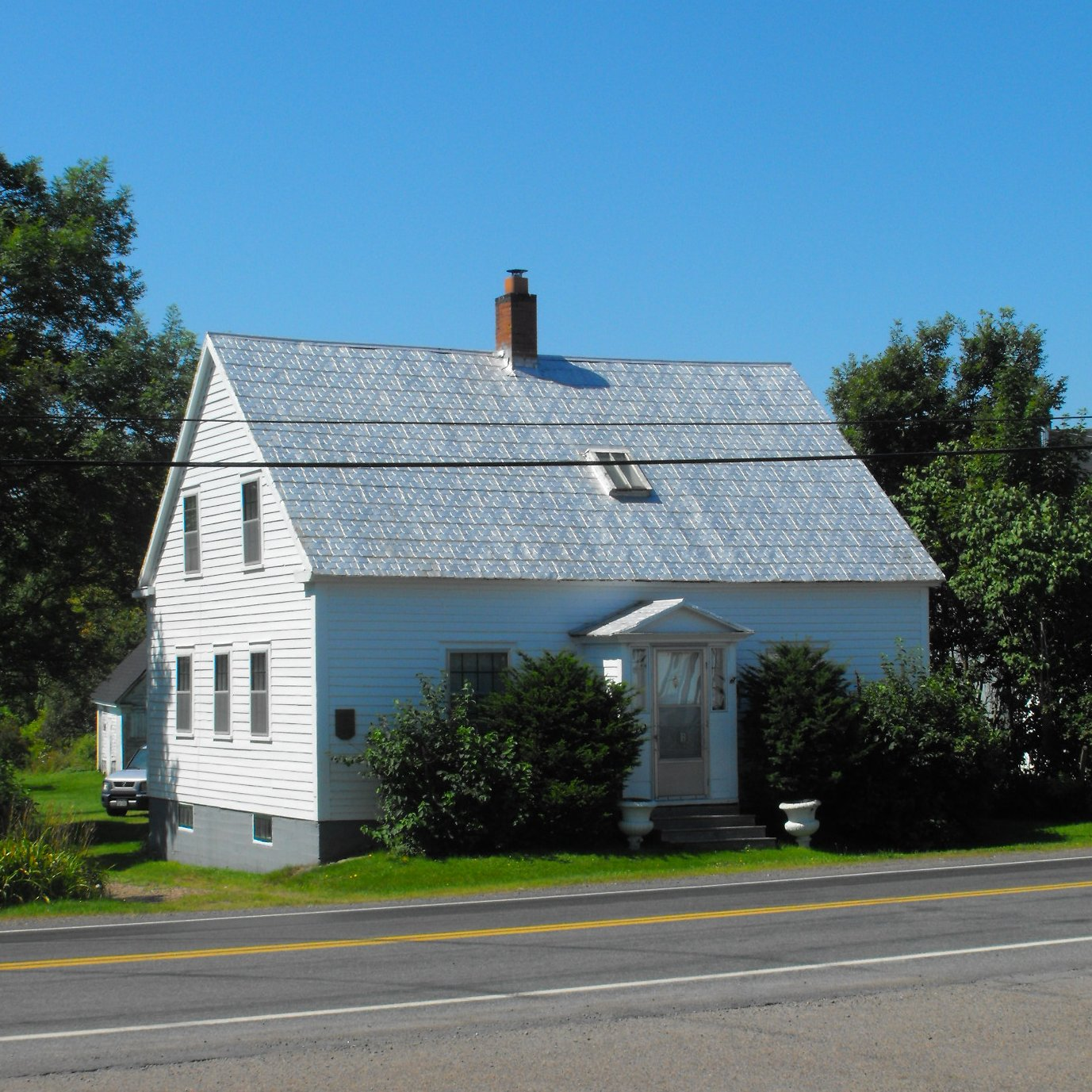
- Interactive map of the Elizabeth Bishop House area

General information
- Architectural style: Classical Revival
- Location: 8740 No 2 Highway; Great Village; Nova Scotia, Canada

Technical details
- Structural system: Wooden frame vernacular

Nova Scotia Heritage Property Act
- Type: Provincially Registered Property
- Designated: 1973-05-21
- Reference no.: 00PNS0221

The Elizabeth Bishop House, also known as the Bulmer House, is an historic single-family house in Great Village, Nova Scotia. The house is associated with Pulitzer Prize winning author Elizabeth Bishop who in her youth lived in the house each summer with her maternal grandparents, William Brown Bulmer and Elizabeth (Hutchinson) Bulmer. Bishop based many of her stories (such as "In the Village") and poems (such as "Filling Station") on aspects of Great Village and Nova Scotia. Although the Bulmers bought the property in 1874, it is not known when it was built. On May 21, 1997, the Bulmer House was recognized as a Nova Scotia Provincially Recognized Heritage Site for its connection to Elizabeth Bishop and her writings as well as for its architectural significance; it is a good example of a typical 1 1/2-storey Classical Revival dwelling dating from between 1800 and 1850, a type common to rural Nova Scotia. In 2004, the house was purchased by a group of artists, who used the building as an artist’s retreat until it was sold again in December 2015. The house is now used as a single family home, however at the time of sale, the new owner was “meeting with members of the Elizabeth Bishop Society to discuss ways to keep the house accessible to the public.”

== See also ==
- Elizabeth Bishop
- List of historic places in Cumberland County, Nova Scotia
