= Point Prim Lighthouse =

Lighthouse in Nova Scotia, Canada

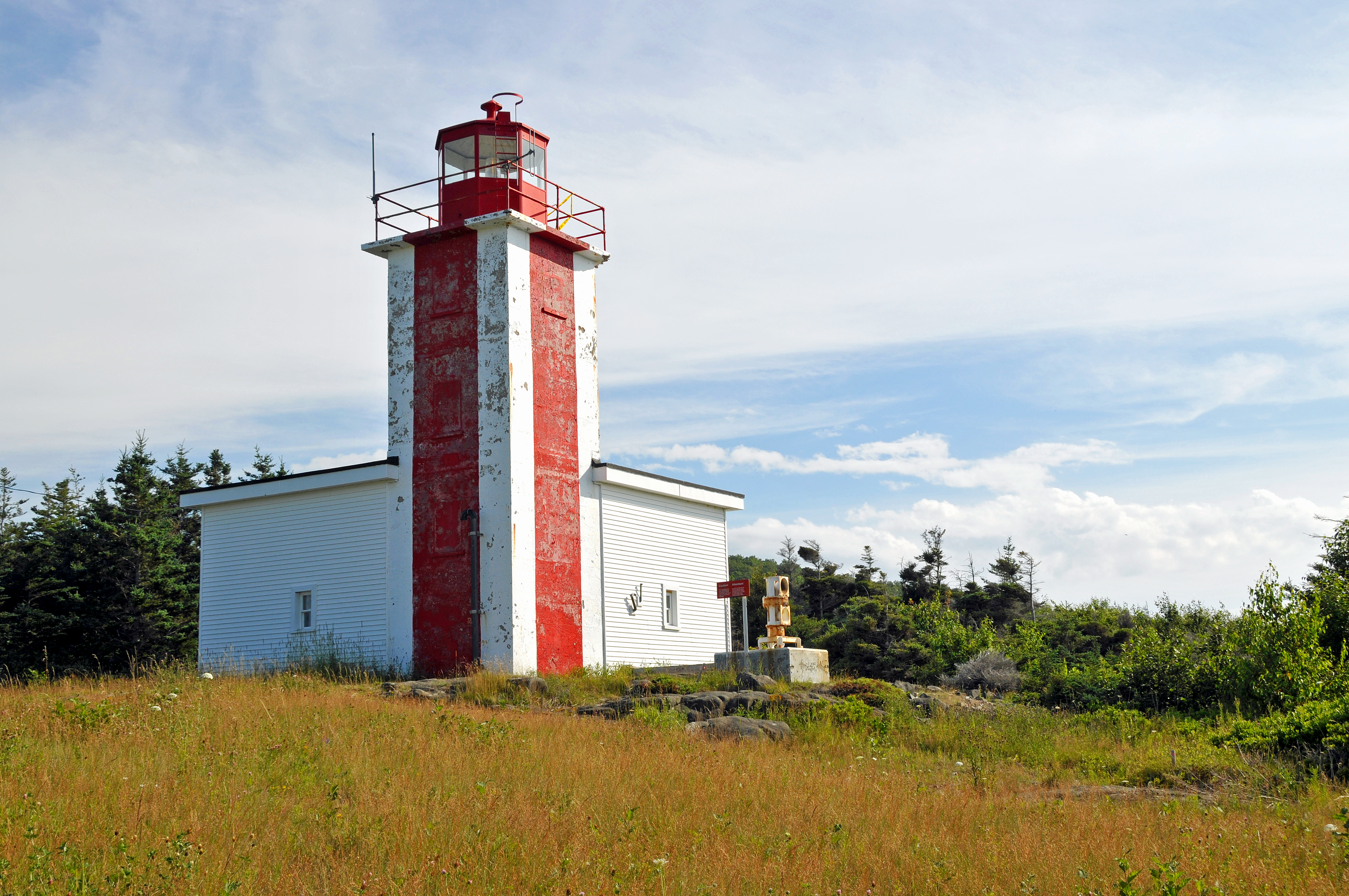
- Location: Municipality of the District of Digby, Canada
- Coordinates: 44°41′27″N 65°47′11″W

Tower
- Constructed: 1964
- Construction: concrete
- Automated: 1984
- Height: 14 m (46 ft)
- Shape: square
- Markings: Red and white (tower), red (lantern)
- Operator: Friends of Point Prim (2011–)
- Heritage: heritage lighthouse, Municipally Registered Property
- Fog signal: 3s. blast every 30s.

Light
- Focal height: 25 m (82 ft)
- Range: 13 nmi (24 km; 15 mi)
- Characteristic: Iso W 6s

The current Point Prim Lighthouse is the fourth in a line of lighthouses built at Point Prim in Canada since 1804. It is located at the mouth of the Digby Gut, which connects the Bay of Fundy with the Annapolis Basin. It is located approximately 8.5 km outside Digby.

Around the lighthouse is a small public park with trails and information boards about the history of the lighthouse and the geologic area. The park offers views of the Bay of Fundy and the Digby Gut. It is operated by The Friends of Point Prim and they have slowly gained support from local contributors who have donated two picnic tables. They have also applied for a grant from Heritage Canada to help with repairs and upkeep of the lighthouse and surrounding parkland. There are also interesting rock formations nearby.

== See also ==
- List of lighthouses in Canada
