= Kingsport, Nova Scotia =

Community in Nova Scotia, Canada

Coordinates: 45°09′38″N 64°21′42″W

Kingsport is a small community located in Kings County, Nova Scotia, Canada, on the shores of the Minas Basin. It was famous at one time for building some of the largest wooden ships ever built in Canada.

== Geography ==
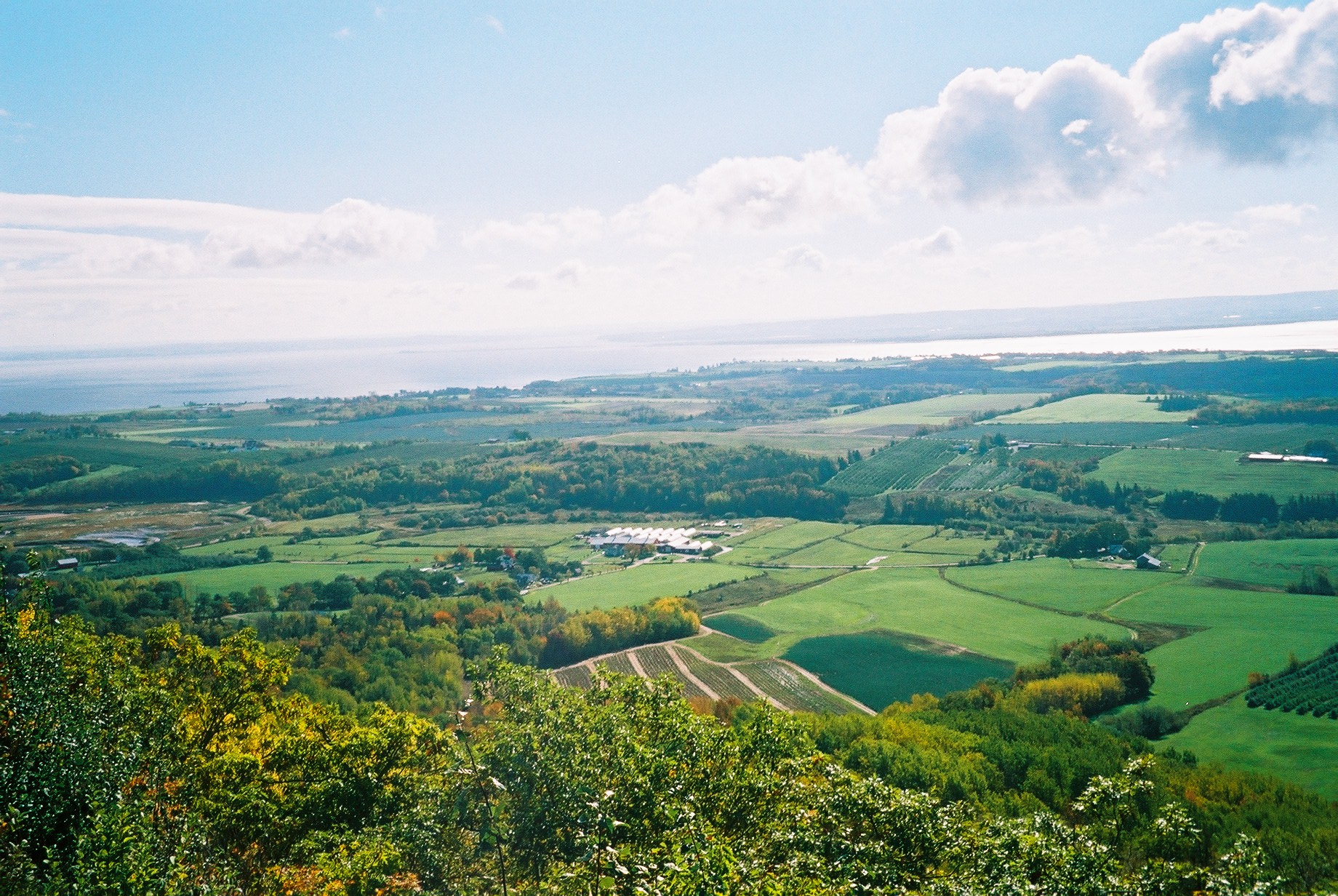
Kingsport, in the centre distance, and surrounding countryside as seen from the Lookoff

Kingsport is located just northeast of the mouth of the Habitant River, on the west side of Minas Basin, a few miles east of Canning at the eastern end of Route 221. It is bordered by a tidal marsh to the west and sandy beaches to the south and east. Red sedimentary cliffs carved by continuous erosion rise from the beaches to the east. The dramatic 12 metre tides produce very large sand and mud flats at low tide. The village is surrounded by large expanses of fertile farmland.

An earlier name was Indian Point, later changed to Oak Point due to the number of oak trees that grew along the bank of the south side of the lower road, leading to the wharf. The name was finally changed to Kingsport in the 1870s, as it became the major port in Kings County.

== Early history ==
As indicated by the name Indian Point, Kingsport is believed to have once been a summer settlement of the Mi'kmaq. It was also part of the Acadian farming community which stretched along the Habitant River. After the expulsion of the Acadians in 1755, Kingsport was settled by New England Planters. One source indicates that Indian Point is mentioned as Lot 16, second division, Cornwallis township granted to Benjamin Newcomb in 1761. Another source says that Kingsport was founded in 1761 or 1762 by Isaac Bigelow who came from Connecticut and was given a grant of land called Oak Point, now Kingsport. Bigelow is the most favoured and Isaac’s son, Ebenezer, born in 1776, is thought to have built the first house in Kingsport.

== Shipbuilding ==
Shipbuilding emerged as a major industry in Kingsport beginning in 1833 with the launch of schooner Emerald. "Some of the largest and finest ships ever built in Canada were designed and built by Ebenezer Cox of Kingsport," according to shipping historian Frederick William Wallace. Starting with the schooner Diadem in 1864, Cox became the master shipbuilder for a series of partnerships which built over 30 vessels of increasing size. Most had names beginning with the letter "K" and began known as the "K Ships". The shipyard included a large mill and blacksmith and used tugboats to brings rafts of timber from the Cape Blomidon area. The Kingsport yards reached their peak in 1890 with the launch of the four-masted barque Kings County followed by the ship Canada in 1891, two of the largest wooden ships ever built in Canada. Ebenezer Cox was by 1890 regarded to have built more ships than any man in Halifax. The launch of Canada on July 6, 1891 attracted over 5,000 people from all across Western Nova Scotia, brought to Kingsport by multiple special trains on the Cornwallis Valley Railway. It was considered the biggest event in the history of Kingsport. The collapse of the wooden shipbuilding industry in Atlantic Canada in the late 19th century led to a decline in the yard. The last major launch being the barquentine Skoda on June 1, 1893, although the Kingsport shipyard refocused for a number of years on ship repair. The yard used the massive Minas Basin tides as a natural drydock into the 1920s repairing such vessels as the American Bradford C. French, the largest three masted schooner ever built. The final Kingsport-built vessel was the schooner FBG built in 1929, the last coastal schooner built in all of Nova Scotia.

== The Railway ==
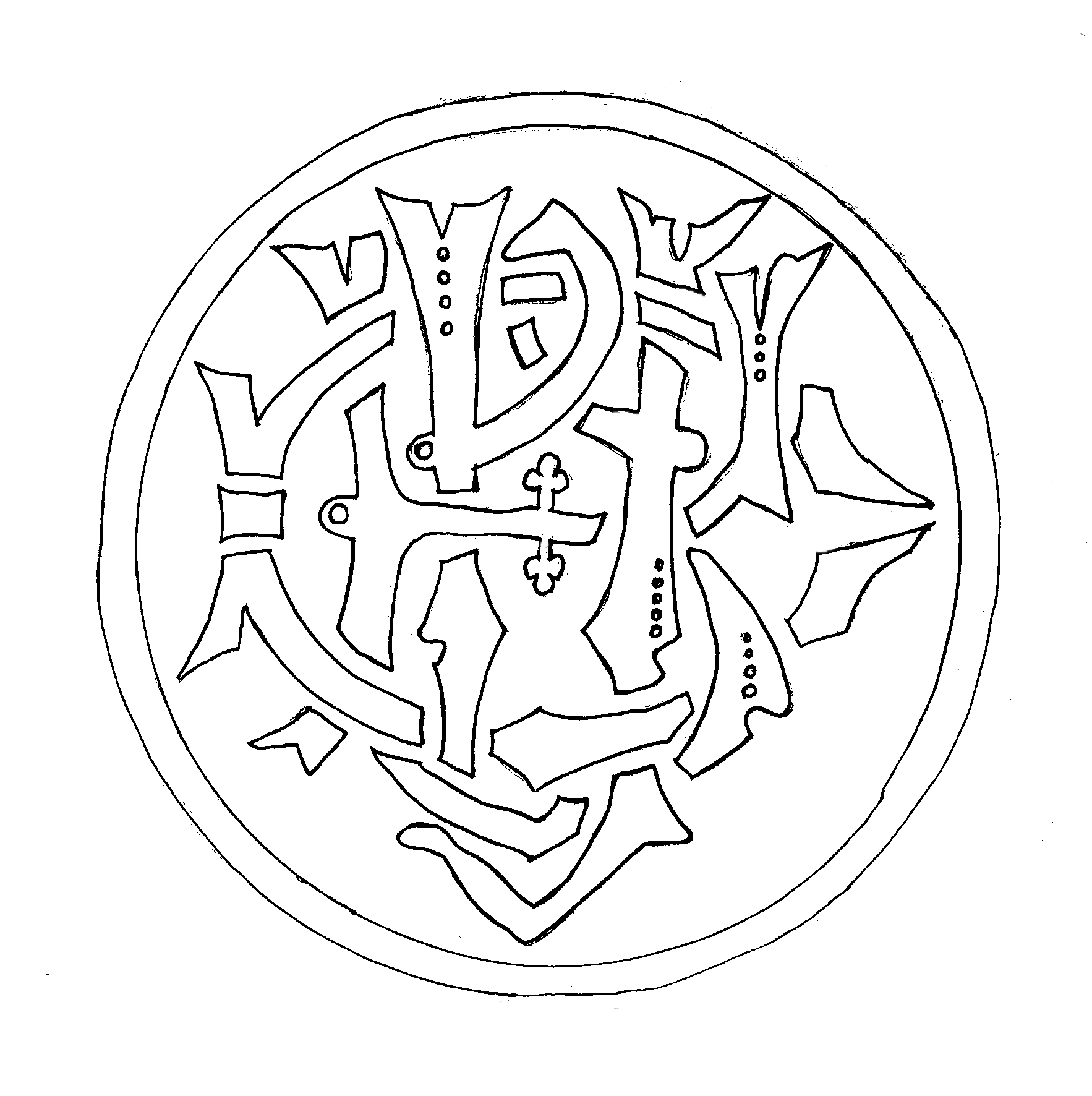
Monogram of the Cornwallis Valley Railway: the "Kingsport Line"

As wooden ships declined, shipbuilding investors in the Kingsport area re-invested in railways. The Cornwallis Valley Railway was built in 1890 connecting Kingsport to Kentville and the mainline of the Dominion Atlantic Railway. Kingsport was the terminus for the eastern end of the line. The first train ran from Kingsport on December 20, 1890, a day regarded as the second most important event in the village's history. A wye and engine shed were built to turn and service locomotives under the care for many years of Ephraim Hiltz. Trains ran eight times a day at the peak of the line. The railway rapidly developed the surrounding apple industry and two large apple warehouses were soon constructed in the village. The line also exploited the large wharf at Kingsport as a regional shipping point for schooners and ocean steamers. It was steadily extended to over 400 feet by 1911 and received a lighthouse in 1889. Apples and potatoes were exported with coal and fertilizer being imported as well as various freight including on one occasion, horses from Sable Island.

The railway also connected at the wharf with the "Parrsboro packets", a series of coastal steamships carrying passengers, vehicles and freight to the Minas Basin ports of Wolfville and Parrsboro, the last of which was the MV Kipawo. Kingsport also became a local holiday resort. People came during the summer months to spend time at their cottages along the bank and at the "bluff". First a hotel, and in later years an ice cream parlour and a dance hall were operated near the wharf area during the summer months. Population peaked by 1910 at 708 people.

A two-room elementary school was built in 1889. High school students commuted to the Kings County Academy in Kentville by school trains specially time to meet class times. The Dominion Atlantic Railway tried replacing passenger service with buses in 1947 but reverted to rail passenger service in 1949.

Kingsport's social life included skating and hockey on Webb's pond and baseball during the spring and summer. Concerts, motion picture shows, pie socials, annual strawberry festivals, harvest suppers, card parties and Whist Club were among social functions. A drive-in operated in the 1930s and 1940s. An Congregational (later United) and Anglican church served Kingsport along with two story school which also served as a community hall.

== Postwar ==
The new generation in Kingsport today cannot recall the scream of flanges as a railway engine was turned on the Wye, the daily arrivals at the government wharf, the whistle of the Kipawo and of the train approaching, or the ringing of the school bell summoning the children to the morning and afternoon sessions at the country schoolhouse. The people of the community can, and do, still hear the ringing of its church bells summoning them to worship, and they have their two churches, a part of the life of a community, which is not now as busy as it once was. The beautiful and picturesque Minas Basin which Kingsport overlooks can still be seen and enjoyed in this little community which is still a pretty spot beside the sea.

— Cora Atkinson, Kingsport historian 1980

The Minas Basin ferry service ended during World War II when Kipawo was called away to war service. The apple industry surrounding Kingsport faced a dramatic downturn with the loss of the British market after the war. This led to a steady decline in traffic on the Cornwallis Valley Railway which ended service to Kingsport in 1961. The growth of highways also bled local shoppers to bigger stores elsewhere. The school was closed in 1963. Both of Kingsport's general stores and its gas station closed. The massive wharf steadily fell into ruins and the village lost more than half its population in a few decades, declining from 500 to 225 by the 1950s.

== Recent years ==
However, Kingsport remained a popular local holiday location for cottagers and in the 1970s emerged as a bedroom community for the growing towns of Eastern Kings County. In 1977, the Kingsport Community Association was organized to improve life in Kingsport. Social events such as pie socials and card parties were held to help bring the residents together and to raise funds to build a playground, clean up the beach and provide steps and picnic tables. In 2003, the Kingsport Community Association began reconstruction of the ruins of the wharf. The outer portions were demolished and the inner portion was rebuilt into a boardwalk, boat ramp, and floats to encourage recreational boating. The association rebuilt a former general store in 2004 as a community centre and public access point for internet use.

== Popular culture ==
Lucy Maud Montgomery used the name Kingsport in her novel Anne of the Island as a moniker for the fictional Nova Scotia town where Anne Shirley attends Redmond College after she leaves Avonlea on Prince Edward Island. The fictional Kingsport is a larger town combining elements inspired by Halifax and Annapolis Royal, Nova Scotia.

The famous Canadian poet Bliss Carman wrote a classic poem of courage about a Kingsport schooner named Scud and her fearless twelve-year-old master. Entitled "Arnold, Master of the Scud", it featured in many Canadian poetry textbooks.

Kingsport features prominently in the book Blomidon Rose, a nostalgic look at the life and landscape of 1930s Annapolis Valley by Esther Clark Wright.

== See also ==
- Royal eponyms in Canada
