= Dominion Atlantic Railway =

Canadian railway company in Nova Scotia

Overview
- Headquarters: Kentville, Nova Scotia
- Reporting mark: DA
- Locale: Nova Scotia, Canada
- Dates of operation: 1894–1994
- Successor: Windsor and Hantsport Railway

Technical
- Track gauge: 4 ft 8 1/2 in (1,435 mm) standard gauge
- Length: 288 miles (463 km)

The Dominion Atlantic Railway (reporting mark DA) was a historic railway which operated in the western part of Nova Scotia, Canada, primarily through the agricultural Annapolis Valley.

The Dominion Atlantic Railway (DAR) was unusually diverse for a regional railway, operating its own hotel chain, steamship line and named luxury trains such as the Flying Bluenose. It is credited with playing a major role in developing Nova Scotia's tourism and agriculture industries.

The DAR's corporate headquarters were originally located in London, United Kingdom, until 1912, followed by Montreal, Quebec, but was always operationally headquartered in Kentville, Nova Scotia, where the railway retained a unique identity and a high degree of independence until the end of the steam era. A depiction of Evangeline from the poem Evangeline, A Tale of Acadie published in 1847 by Henry Wadsworth Longfellow was incorporated into the DAR logo along with the text 'Land of Evangeline Route'.

The company is still legally incorporated and files annual returns with the Nova Scotia Registry of Joint Stock; its headquarters are now in Calgary, Alberta. Portions of the line were operated by the Windsor and Hantsport Railway until 2011.

== Creation through merger ==
The DAR was created on October 1, 1894, through a merger of two end-to-end systems. the Windsor and Annapolis Railway (W&A) and the Western Counties Railway (WCR). The larger and more successful W&A bought out the rival WCR for CA$265,000 (equivalent to $11.2 million in 2025). The merger was authorized by the provincial legislature in 1893.

The W&A owned the track between its namesake port towns of Windsor and Annapolis Royal, and had also negotiated trackage rights to operate over the Intercolonial Railway's (IRC) former Nova Scotia Railway "Windsor Branch" between Windsor Junction and Windsor, as well as on the IRC mainline from Windsor Junction into Halifax. The WCR, on the other hand, operated between Yarmouth and Digby. The new DAR thus had a gap in its trackage between Annapolis Royal and Digby, which would otherwise be continuous from Yarmouth to Halifax. The gap was eventually closed in the early 1890s with government assistance.

Although the DAR technically connected to the ICR at Windsor, the ICR rarely operated on this line and left it to the DAR beyond the mainline connection at Windsor Junction. The DAR system also connected with the Midland Railway at Windsor, the Nova Scotia Central Railway (NSCR) and the Middleton and Victoria Beach Railway (M&VBR) at Middleton, and the Halifax and Southwestern Railway (H&SW) at Yarmouth. The NSCR and M&VBR were both eventually purchased by the H&SW.

The DAR also had a branch north of Kentville to Kingsport, the former Cornwallis Valley Railway, completed in 1889. A westward extension of this branch was started in 1905 on a line formally chartered as the North Mountain Railway, from a junction on the Kingsport line at Centreville west to Weston. It was completed in 1914.

In 1905, the DAR purchased the Midland Railway, giving a more direct connection between Windsor and the ICR at Truro, where lines headed east to Pictou and Cape Breton Island and west to New Brunswick.

== Passenger service ==
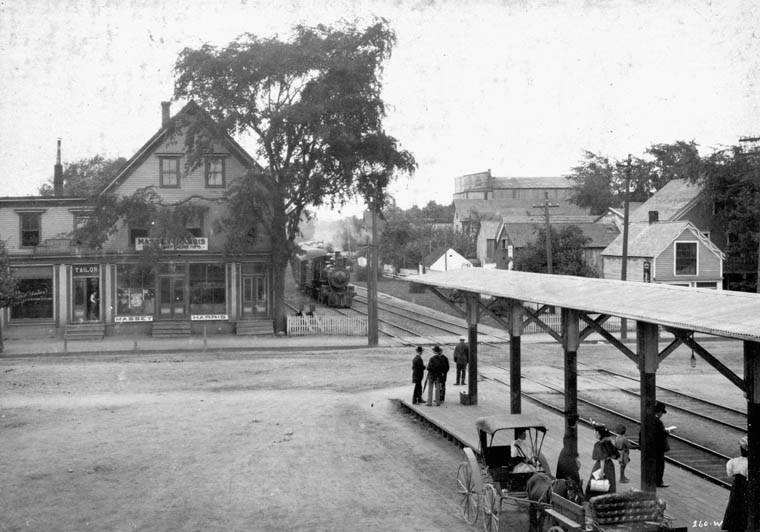
DAR Passenger train arrives at Kentville, circa 1910

The DAR exploited its steamship connections to develop a high level of passenger service not usually seen on regional railways. The DAR not only operated a busy schedule of mixed and express trains, but building on service first tried by its predecessor company, the W&A, the DAR launched several prominent named trains such as the Flying Bluenose and the New Yorker connecting with Boston and New York steamships in the summer. The railway bought the first Pullman parlour cars in all of Canada for this service.

Influenced by promotional themes from Yarmouth steamship companies, the DAR developed an identity as "The Land of Evangeline Route" exploiting interest in Henry Wadsworth Longfellow's poem about the Acadians. This promotion grew to include a whole series of posters, postcards, books, named locomotives and a prominent herald depicting Evangeline which was seen on all DAR publications and most locomotives. The DAR purchased land at Grand Pré in 1917 and built a large garden and replica church dedicated to the memory of the Acadians. It became not only a popular tourism destination but also evolved into a shrine to Acadian people.

The successful development of this market created a remarkable growth in DAR passenger traffic which soared to over 200,000 riders a year in its first five years and is regarded by historians as the introduction of mass tourism in Atlantic Canada.

In an era when few women were employed in positions of responsibility business, the DAR had some of the first female station masters in Canada who, beginning in 1904, ran a number of stations on the line including Mount Uniacke Station, the Avonport Station, the Grand Pre station and Cambridge Station.

== Marine operations ==
A DAR locomotive shunts passenger cars connecting with DAR steamships at Yarmouth, circa 1910

The DAR maintained a strategic link between Halifax and the Bay of Fundy and Gulf of Maine ports of Windsor, Digby and Yarmouth. A key component to the DAR's passenger and freight business was through the connections with various ferries that operated in these waters, mostly from Digby and Yarmouth. A smaller service also operated across the Minas Basin from the smaller ports of Kingsport and Wolfville.

In 1901, the DAR owned and operated nine steamships in the Bay of Fundy and Minas Basin services, serving routes between Digby-Saint John, New Brunswick, with connections to the CPR and IRC, and Kingsport-Parrsboro-Wolfville connecting at Parrsboro with the Cumberland Railway's line to Springhill; the MV Kipawo being the 13th and last vessel on this particular service. The service was terminated during World War II after the vessel was requisitioned by the Royal Canadian Navy.

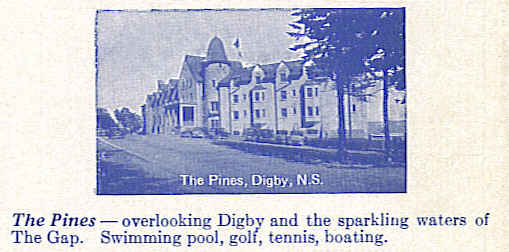
DAR's flagship hotel, the Digby Pines, in 1936

In 1904, service was expanded to use three surplus steamships to include a Gulf of Maine operation between Yarmouth-Boston and Yarmouth-New York. These services launched the DAR into the forefront of Nova Scotia's nascent tourist industry and the railway subsequently built a resort hotel at Digby, the Digby Pines Resort and the Cornwallis Inn in Kentville. After the Canadian Pacific Railway purchased the DAR in 1911, they sold some of its steamship connections, such as the Yarmouth steamships, but expanded others, such as the Digby-Saint John route, which received large new steamships such as the SS Princess Helene.

== Apple industry ==
The DAR was closely tied to the apple industry in the Annapolis Valley. The arrival of the railway in the 1860s transformed apples from a minor locally consumed crop to a large export industry, eventually shipping millions of barrels every year as the major supplier of apples to the United Kingdom.

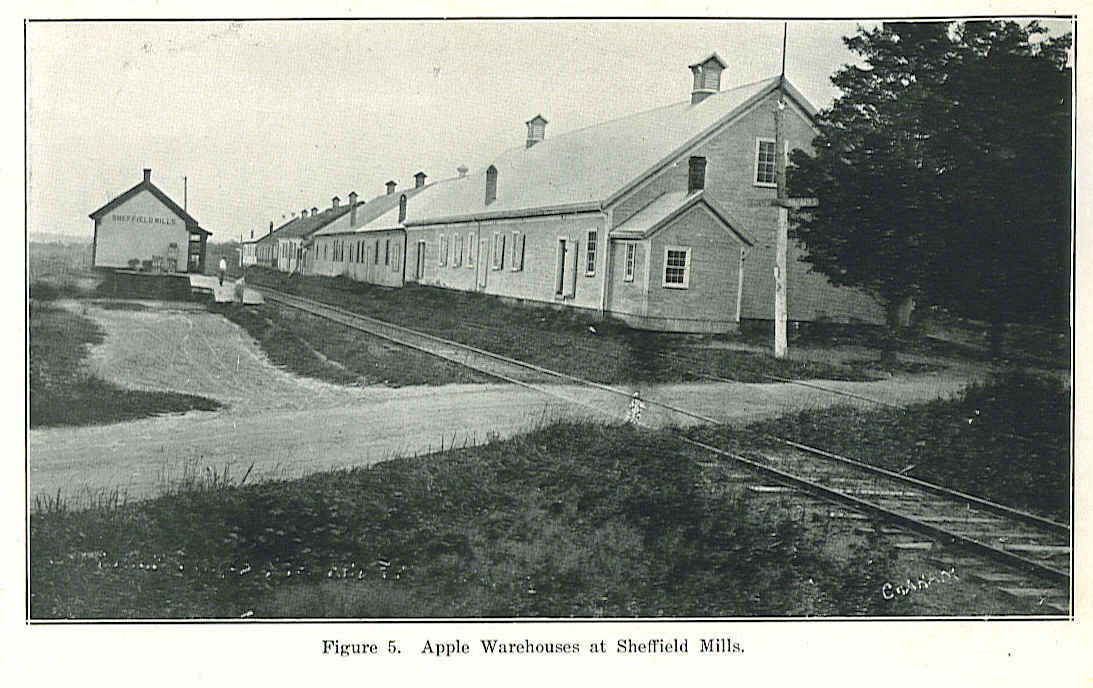
Large apple warehouses along the DAR, Sheffield Mills, circa 1903

Following a brief slump in World War I, apple traffic reached its peak in the 1930s. Over 150 apple warehouses were built along the DAR mainline and its branch lines. For many decades, the period from September to April saw heavy apple traffic on the DAR, moving apples from warehouses to ocean steamers at Halifax, often requiring double-headed specials.

These exports were sharply curtailed during World War II and Nova Scotia never regained its market share in Europe. Nova Scotia's apple industry eventually stabilized after the war but on a smaller scale. The large Scotian Gold co-operative apple processing plant was built beside the DAR mainline at Coldbrook, Nova Scotia using the railway to ship apple and fruit products until the 1970s.

== Canadian Pacific Railway ownership ==
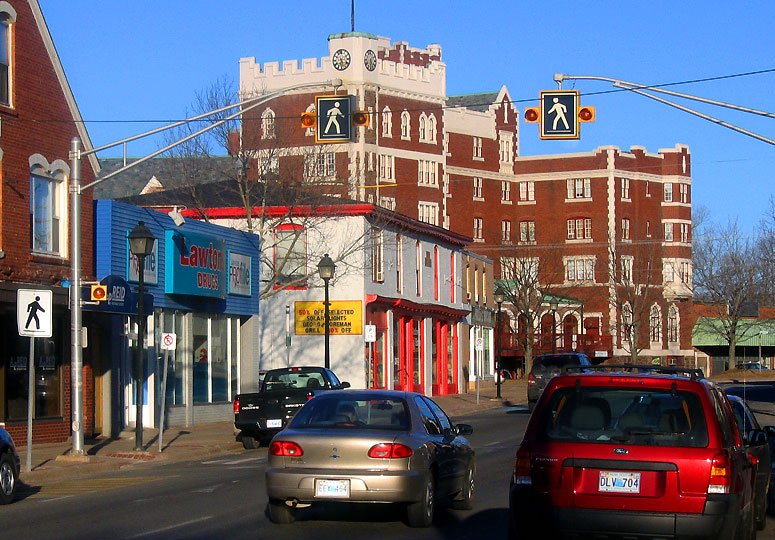
Main Street Station, built by DAR as the Cornwallis Inn, in Kentville

On November 13, 1911, the DAR and all of its subsidiaries were leased by the Canadian Pacific Railway. The move gave the CPR access to the port of Halifax. The new owners allowed the DAR to retain its independence in operations and corporate identity for many decades, making it "the most famous railway in the province". George Graham, a rising CPR superintendent, was appointed General Manager in 1915 to upgrade and expand the DAR. Major new investments were made in locomotives and service facilities. Graham built the Grand Pré Park and built a chain of DAR railway hotels including the Digby Pines Resort, the Cornwallis Inn in Kentville (long converted to apartments and commercial space before being renamed Main Street Station in 2022) and the Lord Nelson Hotel in Halifax. With its own steamships, hotels and branch lines, the DAR was regarded by some as a "Canadian Pacific in miniature".

Throughout the First World War the DAR played an important wartime role. It shipped large numbers of troops from the major Canadian Army training base near Kentville (Aldershot Military Camp). A DAR relief train was one of the first trains to rush with help after the Halifax Explosion in 1917.

The DAR's importance increased in the Second World War as it was the sole railway serving HMCS Cornwallis, a Royal Canadian Navy training and operations base on Annapolis Basin, RCAF Station Greenwood at Greenwood and RCAF Station Stanley at Stanley, as well as the Aldershot Military Camp. HMCS Cornwallis, Digby and Yarmouth were also important RCN operating ports.

== Post–war challenges ==
In the post-war years the DAR moved to replace its steam locomotives with diesel-powered models. However the railway was relatively late among its North American counterparts in doing so (possibly owing to abundant coal being mined in Nova Scotia). The railway experimented with two diesel-electric ALCO S-3 switchers for several months, which were placed in service on July 1, 1956. Steam locomotives were not displaced until the arrival of ten EMD SW1200RS road switchers in April 1959. The SW1200RSes replaced the S-3s, and all but one steam locomotive, which was retained for a short time, a switcher used in service between Kentville and local communities until 1961. The railway also saw CPR introduce two Budd Rail Diesel Cars (RDC) in August 1956 to reduce operating costs of its passenger services which had previously been conventional trains hauled by steam locomotives. The new diesel passenger service was called The Evangeline, although it was widely known in the Annapolis Valley as "The Dayliner".

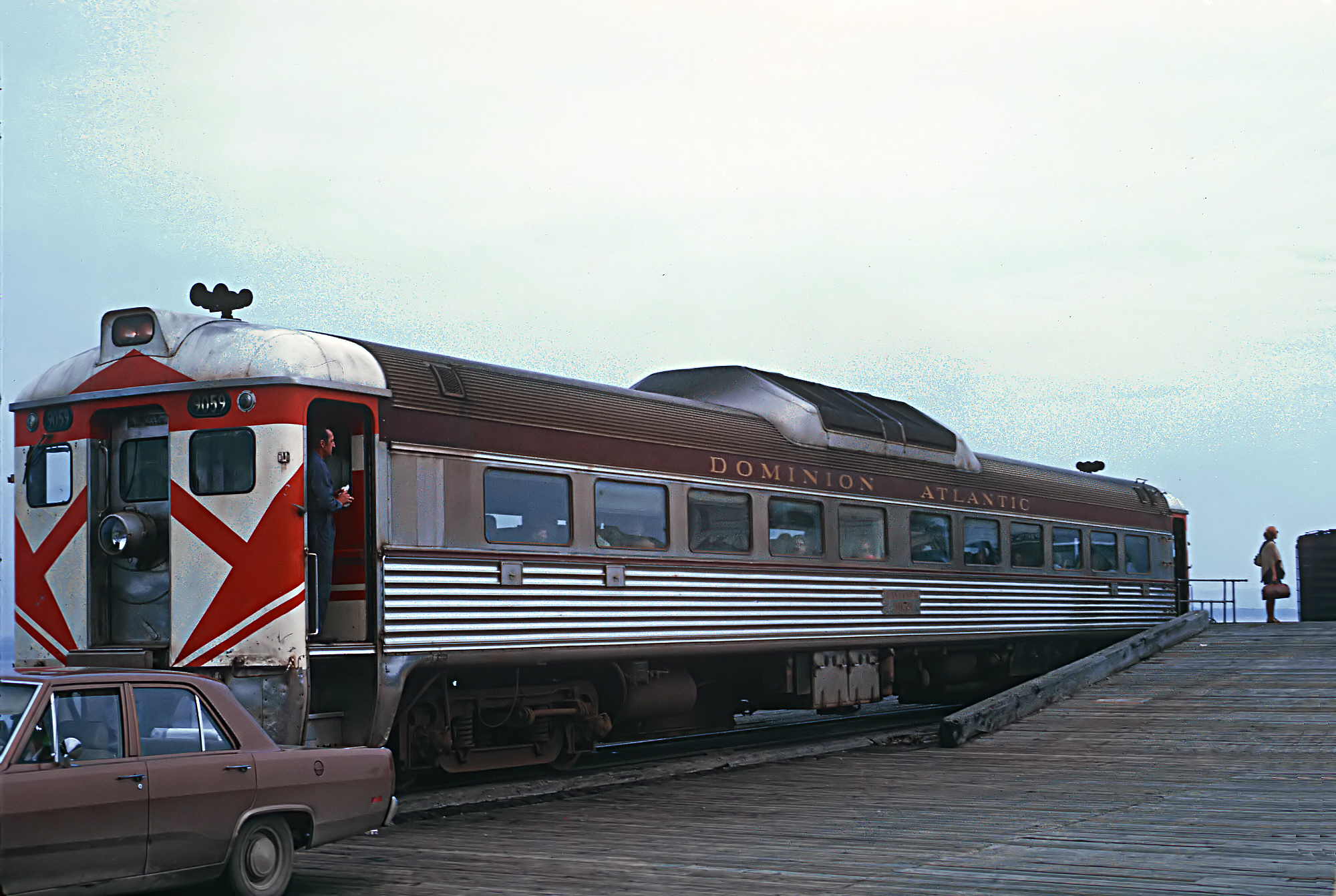
Dominion Atlantic RDC 9059 at Digby Wharf, Sept. 5, 1970

The S-3 diesel locomotives and the original two RDCs were lettered Dominion Atlantic, which makes them unique as the only diesel era equipment lettered for a Canadian Pacific subsidiary line. However, later locomotives and subsequent RDCs were lettered Canadian Pacific. The road name Dominion Atlantic gradually faded throughout the rest of the railway's existence although the name remained on maintenance of way vehicles, some passenger timetables, tickets, stationary, as well as a few stations.

Declining passenger business and the collapse of the Annapolis Valley's apple industry led to reduction in service. The DAR's steamship services on Minas Basin and the Gulf of Maine were abandoned, although the company maintained the passenger/auto ferry connection between Digby and Saint John. With passenger service falling, the DAR sold its hotel chain as well as the Grand Pré Park in 1957. A larger new ferry terminal was built with federal assistance at Digby Gut in 1971 but its location away from the DAR's track and station in Digby ended the ferry - rail connection.

During my years of traveling from my home town of Truro to Acadia University in Wolfville (1969–1974) I learned that passenger service was about to end on the DAR. My father used to travel on the DAR to Acadia 30 years earlier so I was sad to hear the news. I decided that I would be the last paying passenger on the DAR. The trip was only from Truro to near Windsor. The passenger car being too old and too sooty, I traveled in the caboose and ate my breakfast with the train crew.

— David Lavers

By the 1970s, the DAR was starting to see its operations west of Kentville reduced to branch line status. The Cornwallis Valley Railway branch lines north of Kentville to Kingsport and Weston were abandoned on January 31, 1961, for lack of passenger traffic and the postwar collapse of the apple industry and reduced to a three-mile spur line to Steam Mill Village. CPR began reducing its passenger service to minimal levels between Halifax-Yarmouth and Windsor-Truro upon construction of the parallel taxpayer-funded all-weather Highway 101 between Halifax and Kentville after 1970. In a 1969 agreement with the provincial and federal governments, CPR built a new passenger/auto ferry for service between Saint John and Digby, while the governments built new ferry terminals and connecting highways. Both of the new ferry terminals were built away from the railway lines, so that neither permitted rail-side transfers at the dock from passenger train to ferry, causing the Dayliner or RDC service to suffer further declines in passenger numbers.

The only bright spot for DAR was in gypsum traffic, a mineral that was quarried just east of Windsor and hauled to expanded port facilities at Hantsport; it was in high demand throughout the post-war years during the North American housing construction boom. Prior to Hantsport's expansion, gypsum had also been hauled farther west to the Annapolis Basin at Deep Brook, however shipping operations were consolidated at Hantsport in the post-war years.

In 1978, financial responsibility for the Halifax-Yarmouth passenger services was transferred to the federally owned Crown corporation Via Rail from the DAR/CPR. The Windsor-Truro mixed train passenger service on the Midland, which had survived as the last mixed train on the CPR and one of the last mixed trains in North America, was abandoned in 1979 after being deemed non-essential, reducing the Truro branch line to light freight status. Passenger service on the DAR began to rise, particularly after a 1983 schedule change which provided a daily return trip to Halifax from all points on the line, as well as improved connections to other Via trains at Halifax. Via also introduced refurbished Budd RDCs, and began a modest promotional campaign which included reviving the name Evangeline, drawing on Acadian history, a longtime focus of DAR travel. By 1984, Via reported that traffic in its Halifax-Yarmouth service had quadrupled to an average of more than 100 passengers per trip, eclipsing most of the decline experienced in previous decades. The Evangeline would continue operating until January 15, 1990, following a massive cut in funding to Via's branch line services ordered in the 1989 federal budget by Prime Minister Brian Mulroney's government. Abandonment proceedings for the Kentville to Yarmouth portion of the line were commenced by CP with in three months of the VIA cuts.

== Railway decline in southwestern Nova Scotia ==
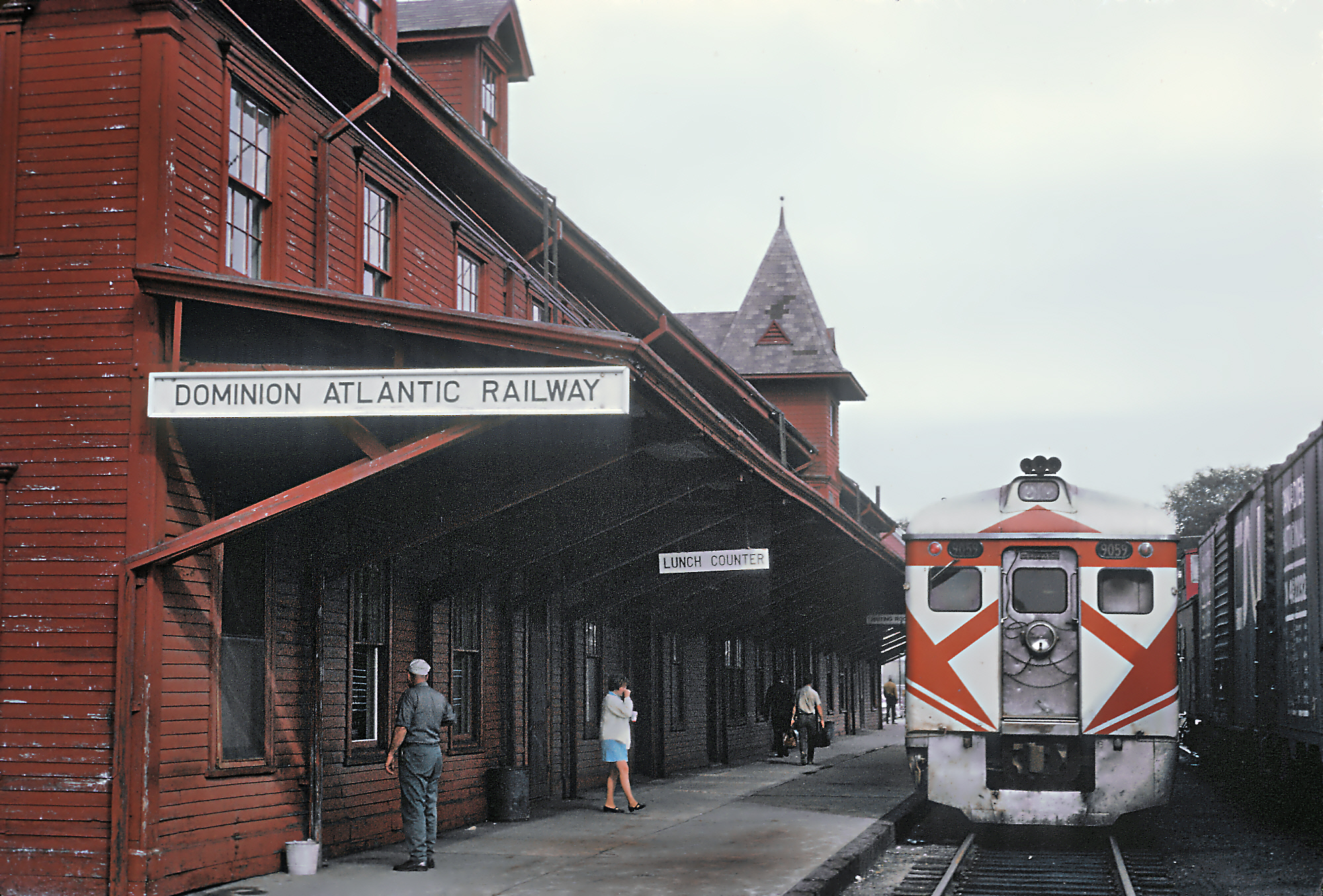
Dominion Atlantic Railway at Kentville

In 1981, Canadian National Railway, successor to the Halifax and Southwestern Railway, abandoned its trackage which connected to the DAR at Yarmouth and Middleton. On May 22, 1986, the DAR abandoned its tracks between Truro and Mantua, just east of Windsor where it continued to serve a gypsum quarry. In 1988, CPR announced that all of its money-losing services east of Montreal would be grouped under a new internal marketing division called Canadian Atlantic Railway (of which the DAR was one component, along with CPR properties in New Brunswick, Maine, and the Eastern Townships of Quebec).

The fate of any possible resurgence in freight and passenger traffic on the tracks west of Kentville was sealed with the construction of final links in the all-weather Highway 101 between Kentville and Yarmouth in the mid to late 1980s; in addition, there were several large steel bridges on this section of the railroad that were nearing the end of their maintenance lifecycle, thus requiring major expenditures. By 1989, almost the only trains using this portion of the DAR were the Via RDCs, which were experiencing passenger declines due to recent highway expansion and competing bus services, as well as changes to Via connecting train schedules. In the January 15, 1990, cuts to Via Rail by the government of Prime Minister Brian Mulroney, the RDC service between Halifax and Yarmouth was abolished.

On March 27, 1990, CPR abandoned the DAR's trackage west of Kentville to Yarmouth, concentrating efforts on the more-profitable eastern end of the DAR which hauled gypsum and served a concentration of industries in New Minas as well as a short remnant of the Kingsport line between Kentville and Steam Mill Village. On September 16, 1993, the DAR operated the last freight train in Kentville and by October had reduced its westernmost trackage to New Minas. The locomotive shop facilities were moved that month from Kentville to Windsor.

== Selling the DAR ==
In 1993 CPR announced that it was selling its entire Canadian Atlantic Railway subsidiary, including the DAR. Although the New Brunswick-Quebec section of CAR would actually be abandoned for a short period at the end of December 1994, the DAR was sold to Iron Road Railways, owner of the Bangor and Aroostook Railroad. The DAR operated its last four trains on Friday, August 26, 1994, just 36 days short of one hundred years.

Its successor, the Windsor and Hantsport Railway, began operations on August 27, 1994, maintaining service on the remnants of the DAR between Windsor and New Minas, including the remnant of the Truro Subdivision that served the large open pit gypsum mines several miles east of Windsor, as well as operating the "Windsor Branch" to Windsor Junction where the system had a connection with CN's mainline between Halifax and Montreal. The Windsor and Hantsport ceased operation in 2011 after gypsum exports to the United States collapsed. The W&H had assumed the original long-term lease of the Windsor Branch from CN until it expired in 2013.

== Heritage and culture ==
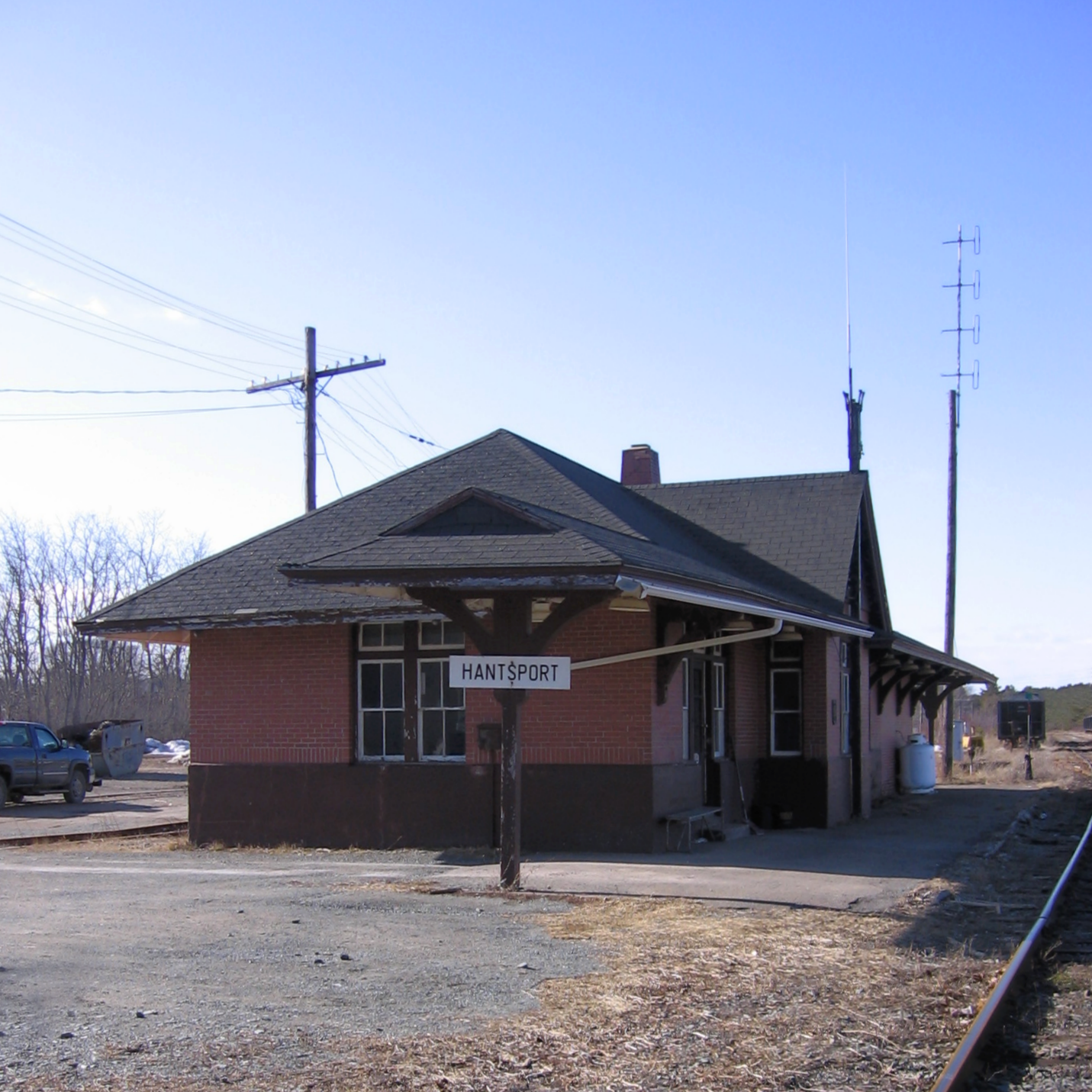
The former DAR station in Hantsport is a federally protected historic building.

A number of DAR stations were restored for adaptive re-use such as a town library in Wolfville, a museum in Kentville, a restaurant in Bridgetown and a museum in Middleton. Two stations, Hantsport and Wolfville, are federally protected buildings, designated since 1992 under the Heritage Railway Stations Protection Act.

Only one DAR steam locomotive was preserved, No. 999 Fronsac, at the Canadian Railway Museum in Delson, Quebec. The DAR's business car Nova Scotia is being preserved at the Toronto Railway Museum, Toronto, Ontario, while a passenger coach, No. 1303 Micmac, is preserved at the Canada Science and Technology Museum in Ottawa, Ontario. A snowplow and combine car (used for the Windsor-Truro mixed train service until 1978) were preserved at the Musquodoboit Railway Museum in Musquodoboit Harbour, Nova Scotia, although the combine was demolished in 2021. One of the DAR's first RDC Dayliner, DAR 9058 (later VIA 6133) has been preserved by railway author and model company owner Jason Shron. A monument to Vernon Smith, the railway engineer who built much of the line was built beside the DAR tracks at a waterfront park in Wolfville in 2013.

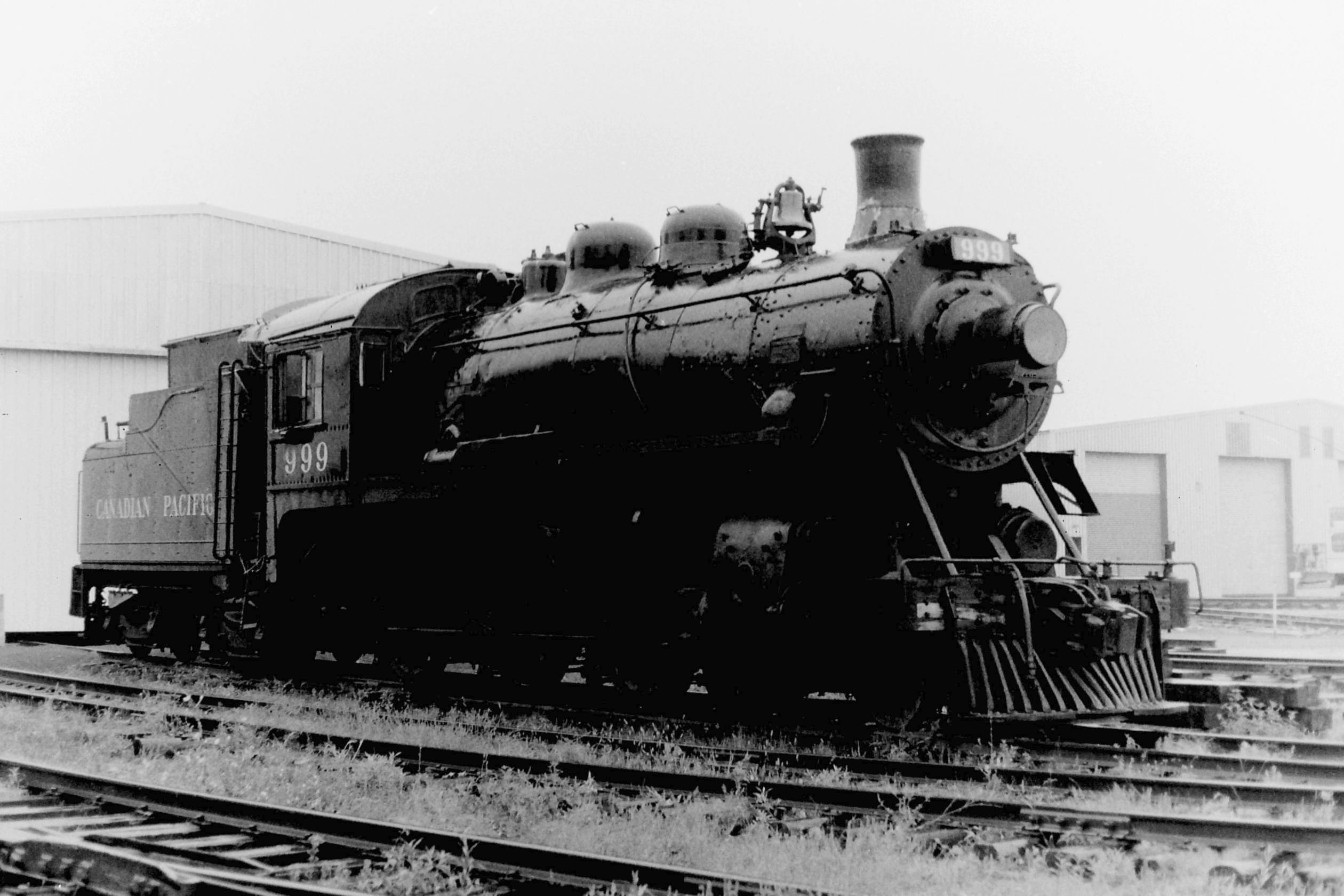
DAR locomotive 999 preserved at the Canadian Railway Museum, 1970

The Middleton Railway Museum in Middleton, Nova Scotia has restored the former DAR station and maintains a DAR photograph collection as well as a large model train layout depicting the operation of the DAR. The Apple Capital Museum in Berwick, Nova Scotia presents the railway's role in the apple industry with a large working model railway diorama of the town in the 1930s. A large collection of Dominion Atlantic Railway artifacts are held at the Kings County Museum in Kentville, while the Musquodoboit Harbour Railway Museum has preserved the DAR collection of George Warden.

Strangely, the town of Kentville, once headquarters to the DAR, showed little interest in the railway's legacy for decades and turned down all offers to preserve equipment or buildings. The DAR's large 2-storey station housing the railway's headquarters was the oldest station in Nova Scotia and one of the oldest wood railway stations in Canada was demolished in 1990. In May 2007, the town of Kentville revealed plans to demolish the town's last surviving railway structure, the ten-stall roundhouse. The move triggered a protest movement led by such groups as the Nova Scotia Railway Heritage Society as it was the last such structure in all of Nova Scotia and one of the last in Canada. Many organizations felt it could be converted for public or commercial purposes. It was demolished on July 9 and 10, 2007. The small VIA Rail station in Kentville was preserved by the town after passenger service ended in 1990. First used as a bus station, it was leased to the Kentville Historical Society in 2019 and now houses a museum which includes a room of artifacts dedicated to the DAR.

In addition to the Dominion Atlantic's major influence on tourism and heritage presentation in Nova Scotia, it also inspired several generations of writers and artists. The noted Canadian poet Charles G. D. Roberts wrote a book of prose and verse sponsored by the railway in 1900. Children's author Zillah K. Macdonald wrote two books The Bluenose Express (1928) and Mic Mac on the Track (1930), personalizing the railway's locomotives and their adventures in a style that predated the famous Thomas the Tank Engine characters created by British railway enthusiast Rev. Wilbert Awdry in 1942. In the rural Canadian classic, The Mountain and the Valley (1952) by Ernest Buckler, the railway is used as an important symbol of change and the outside world. The Dominion Atlantic features prominently in the book Blomidon Rose (1957), a nostalgic look at the life and landscape of 1930s Annapolis Valley by Esther Clark Wright. The Dominion Atlantic inspired poetry by noted Nova Scotian writer George Elliot Clarke, a wistful, erotic poem of youth entitled "Dominion Atlantic Railway" in his 1983 book Saltwater Spirituals and Deeper Blues. The noted Canadian painter Alex Colville drew inspiration from several DAR trackside scenes for several major works including his painting "French Cross" and "Dog and Bridge".

== See also ==
- List of defunct Canadian railways
