= John M. Blaikie =

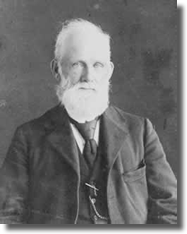
John M. Blaikie

John MacKay Blaikie (born c. 1837) was a merchant and shipbuilder from Great Village, Nova Scotia. Blaikie ran a supply store and was responsible for the building of many ships in the region. Blaikie is significant as a ship builder for building the first four-masted barque in Canada, and one of only two built in the Maritimes.

The ship, named after its owner, was a 1778-ton barque that was built in 1885 at Great Village, and was one of several ships built by Blaikie both individually and with his partners, A.W. McLellan, W.E. McRobert and Captain James Campbell. He had two master shipbuilders employed, named Joseph Geddes and David Morris, who oversaw the building projects. John Blaike was a prominent member of the small village and an important figure in the shipbuilding industry of the region.

John Blaikie's house in Great Village, Nova Scotia was built in the 1870s, and still exists today as a historical bed and breakfast.

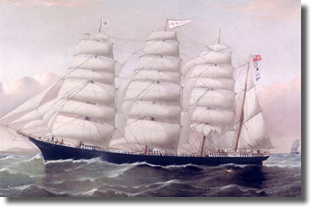
The barque John M. Blaikie
