= SS Princess Helene =

- Postcard of Princess Helene

History

Canada
- Name: 1930: Princess Helene; 1963: Helene; 1965: Carina II; 1967: Carina
- Owner: 1930: Canadian Pacific Railway; 1963: Marvic Navigation Inc; 1964: International Cruises SA
- Operator: 1930: Canadian Pacific Railway; 1963: AJ & DJ Chandris
- Port of registry: 1930: St John, NB; 1963: Piraeus
- Builder: Wm Denny & Bros, Dumbarton
- Launched: 12 May 1930
- Completed: October 1930
- Identification: UK official number 156707; call sign VGKL (1934–63)
- Fate: Scrapped 1977

General characteristics
- Tonnage: 4,055 GRT, 2,022 NRT
- Length: 320.1 ft (97.6 m)
- Beam: 50.6 ft (15.4 m)
- Depth: 24.3 ft (7.4 m)
- Decks: 2
- Installed power: 1,123 NHP
- Propulsion: 2 × screws; 6 × steam turbines
- Speed: 19 knots (35 km/h)

SS Princess Helene was a passenger and cargo ferry operated by the Canadian Pacific Railway (CPR).

William Denny and Brothers built Princess Helene in 1930 at Dumbarton, Scotland. She was custom designed for CPR's Bay of Fundy service connecting the CPR's eastern mainline railway terminus at Saint John, New Brunswick with the port of Digby, Nova Scotia, which was served by a CPR subsidiary, the Dominion Atlantic Railway.

Replacing the older and smaller DAR steamer Empress, Princess Helene could carry 500 passengers and 50 automobiles as well as large amounts of freight. Special side-loading doors moved vehicles and freight to large wharf elevators at Digby and Saint John to cope with the tidal range in the Bay of Fundy. Princess Helene was part of a chain of CPR's transportation system that "spanned the world" and as such she was outfitted in the style of the company's "Duchess" ocean liners. She had 43 state rooms complemented by beautiful interior fittings that exceeded the usual standards of Canada's regional ferries. Crew uniforms were modeled on the Royal Canadian Navy and each time she passed the DAR's Digby Pines Hotel, bellboys would dip the hotel's flag and salute.

Nicknamed the "Digby Boat", Princess Helene made her crossings without fail across the turbulent and foggy Bay of Fundy and through the dangerous waters of Digby Gut. She steamed 168,400 miles during 33 years of service, including precarious crossings during World War II where she was often escorted by Royal Canadian Navy warships and Royal Canadian Air Force aircraft because of the danger of attack by German U-boats. Princess Helene was replaced on April 27, 1963, by Princess of Acadia, formerly the CPR's British Columbia ferry Princess of Nanaimo. The new ship had a greater capacity for automobile and truck traffic but lacked her predecessor's grand ocean liner charm and would be replaced by another newly built vessel carrying the same name Princess of Acadia within 7 years.

Hugh "Sam" Macdonald was the longtime Chief Engineer of the SS Princess Helene. His nephew, Donald Stovel Macdonald was a member of Pierre Trudeau's Cabinet and served as President of the Privy Council, Minister of National Defence, Minister of Energy, Mines and Resources and Minister of Finance.

Princess Helene was sold to Chandris Lines of Greece, extensively rebuilt, and renamed Carina II. She operated budget cruises until 1972 when she was laid up and subsequently sold for scrap several years later. A large builder's model of Princess Helene is preserved today at the Canada Science and Technology Museum in Ottawa.

"The 4,000 ton Princess Helene closed out 33 years service Saturday (May 4th, 1963) - on this run patronized by the people of the Maritimes as well as vacationers from other parts of Canada, the United States and elsewhere. While Helene's last trip was a nostalgic one for its 240 passengers, it was even more so for Captain A. Roy Conley, master since 1946, who has been with the vessel since she entered service in 1930. Captain Conley has made over 21,000 crossings on the Bay of Fundy during his half-century at sea - 45 of them with the Canadian Pacific. " The Montreal Gazette - May 6, 1963.

== See also ==
- Princess fleet
