= Cornwallis Valley Railway =

Historic railroad in Nova Scotia

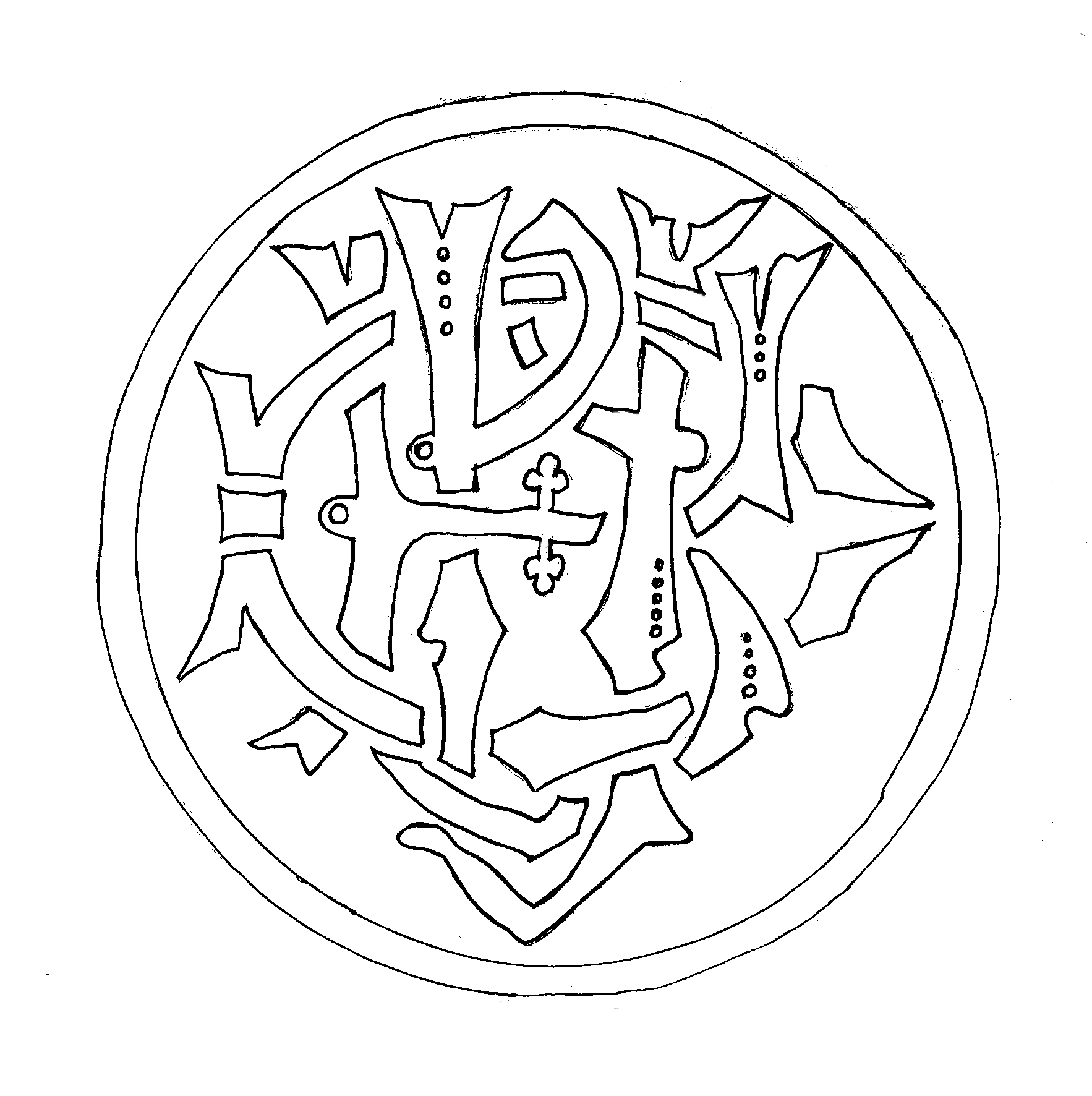

Overview
- Headquarters: Canning, Nova Scotia
- Locale: Nova Scotia, Canada
- Dates of operation: 1887–1892
- Successor: Windsor and Annapolis Railway

Technical
- Track gauge: 4 ft 8 1/2 in (1,435 mm) standard gauge
- Length: 13.6 mi (21.9 km)

The Cornwallis Valley Railway (CVR) was a historic Canadian railway in Nova Scotia's Annapolis Valley. It was built in 1889 and ran 13.6 miles (21.9 km) from Kentville to Kingsport serving the Cornwallis Township area of Kings County. For most of its history, it operated as a branch line of the Dominion Atlantic Railway and was sometimes known as the "Kingsport Line".

== Route ==
The CVR crossed its namesake, the Cornwallis River, at Kentville and ran north to stations at the Camp Aldershot military base, Mill Village (Steam Mill), and Centreville and then ran east to Ford's Crossing (Gibson Woods), Sheffield Mills, Hillaton, Canning, Pereau, and ended on the large government wharf at Kingsport. An additional branch, the North Mountain Line was added in 1914 running 12 miles (19 km) from Centreville to Weston.

== Creation ==
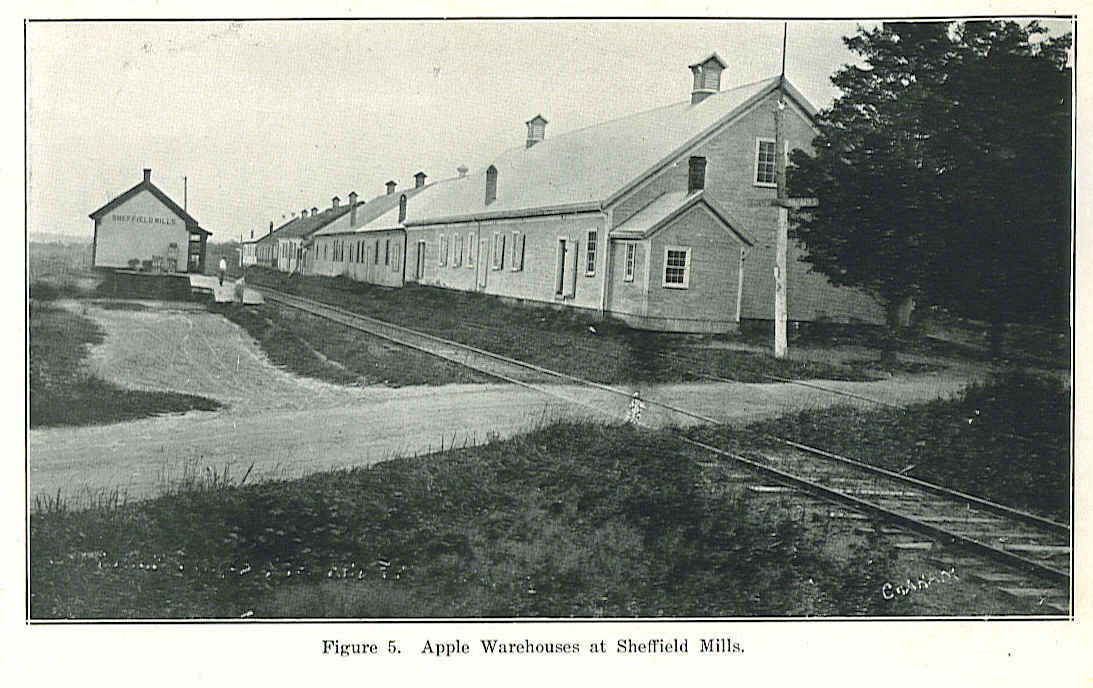
A typical CVR scene, circa 1931: the small country station and giant apple warehouses of Sheffield Mills

The Cornwallis Valley Railway was formed in 1887 by merchants in Canning, Nova Scotia, and Kentville including the Member of Parliament Frederick William Borden. Canning merchant Stephen Sheffield was the president. The first sod was turned at Canning to symbolically begin construction on September 28, 1888. Built with local labour under professional supervision, the line opened on December 22, 1890, leasing rolling stock and terminal facilities from the Windsor and Annapolis Railway (W&A) in Kentville. Tapping the richest apple growing areas of Nova Scotia's Annapolis Valley, the railway immediately led to the construction of large warehouses beside its tracks to pack and ship apples. It quickly proved profitable and was purchased by the Windsor and Annapolis Railway in 1892. When the W&A became the Dominion Atlantic Railway in 1894, the CVR became a subdivision of the Dominion Atlantic but the name "CVR" continued in local use until the line was finally abandoned in the 1990s.

== Growth ==
The CVR's traffic thrived on apple exports as well as freight and passengers from the connection to steamers and schooners at the Kingsport wharf. Apple warehouses grew to 30 on the short line: one for every mile and a half of track. It enjoyed heavy traffic in its first decades, running up to scheduled six trains a day. It also served as a suburban railway for the central part of Kings County, bringing school children, shoppers and workers to town in the morning and back home at night. In 1914, a western branch was completed to Weston, adding more apple shipping traffic.

== Closure ==
The collapse of the apple industry after 1945 and the increasing availability of paved roads both eroded traffic in the 1950s. After several years of application, the Dominion Atlantic abandoned most of the CVR lines in 1961. Tracks were cut back to Mill Village, (Steam Mill), 2 miles north of Kentville. The line became a spur serving feed mills and a fertilizer plant at Mill Village.

On September 22, 1993, the owner of the Dominion Atlantic, CP Rail, abandoned all its tracks west and north of Kentville. Most of the CVR was sold to adjacent landowners, although portions of the roadbed remain as informal hiking and snowmobile trails. Only one station survives, the Camp Aldershot Station, now used by the camp's military band.
