= Stanley, Nova Scotia =

Community in Nova Scotia, Canada

Stanley
- Location in Nova Scotia
- Coordinates: 45°5′20″N 63°55′26″W
- Country: Canada
- Province: Nova Scotia
- County: Hants County
- Municipality: East Hants Municipality
- Time zone: UTC-4 (AST)
  - Summer (DST): UTC-3 (ADT)
- Canadian Postal Code: B0N
- Area code: 902
- Telephone Exchange: 883
- NTS Map: 011E04
- GNBC Code: CBKIG

Stanley is an unincorporated community in the Canadian province of Nova Scotia, located in East Hants Municipality in Hants County.

Slightly over halfway between the equator and the North Pole, Stanley is 56 kilometers north of Halifax and 23 kilometers east of Windsor, on Route 236. Stanley is most famous as the birthplace of the acclaimed Canadian poet Alden Nowlan.

== History ==
Stanley's first settler was New England planter John Smith, who in 1760 established a village on the banks of the Kennetcook River. He was quickly followed by John Anthony (1761) and James Campbell (1772). After the American Revolution, the area became part of Douglas Township and was settled by soldiers of the British 84th Regiment. In 1883 the community was renamed for Governor General Stanley, after whom the Stanley Cup of the National Hockey League is also named.

During the Second World War, the community became the site of Stanley Airport, which the Royal Canadian Air Force used from March 17, 1941 until January 14, 1944 to train pilots under the British Commonwealth Air Training Plan. Many of the citizens of Stanley assisted the war effort by actively supporting the RCAF in training Commonwealth pilots. Barracks were built for 360 trainees and support staff. The hangar erected to house the aircraft became the largest building in Hants County. Currently, the airport is maintained by the Stanley Sport Aviation group.

== Alden Nowlan ==
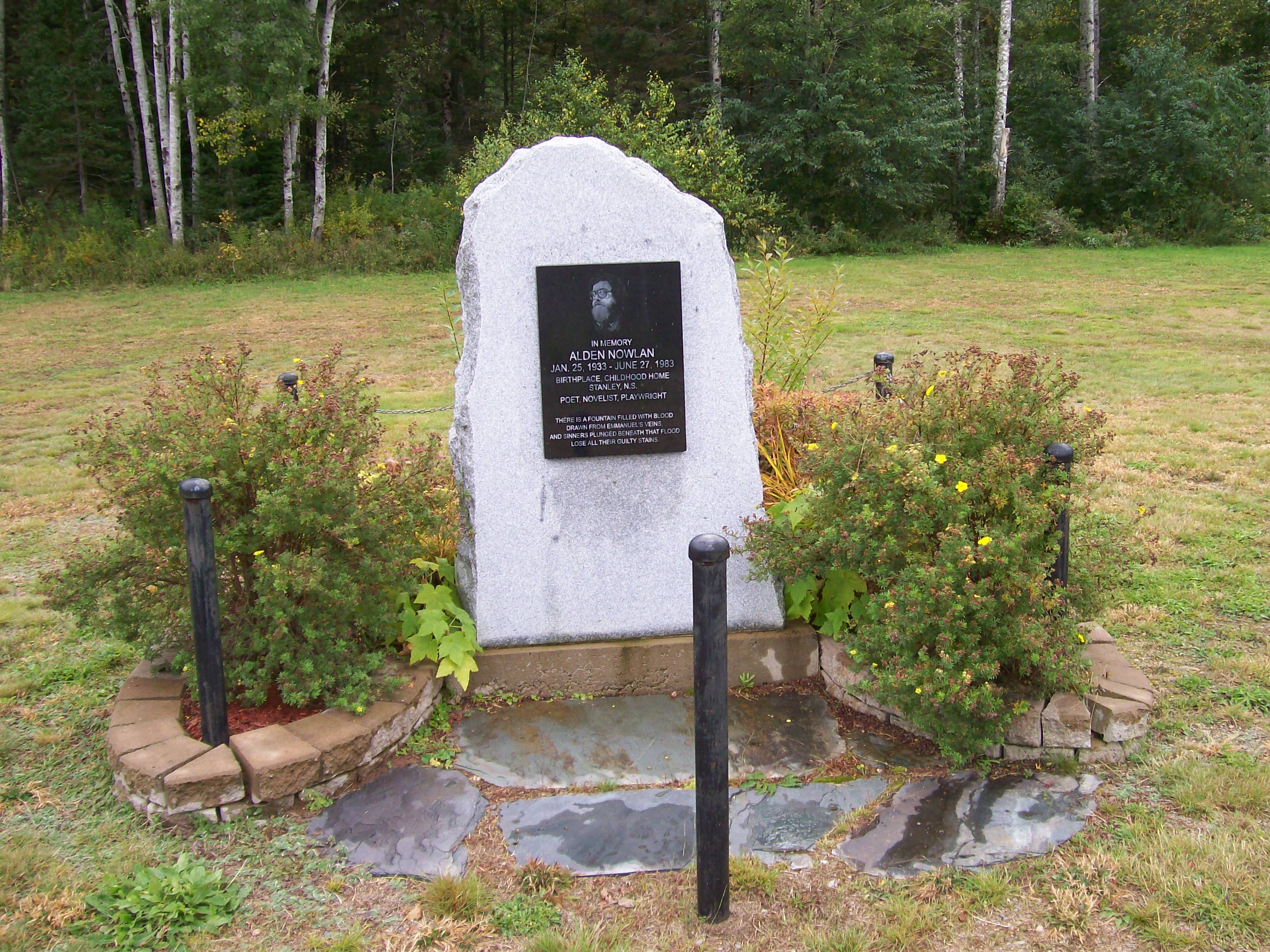
Cairn for Alden Nowlan in Stanley, Nova Scotia

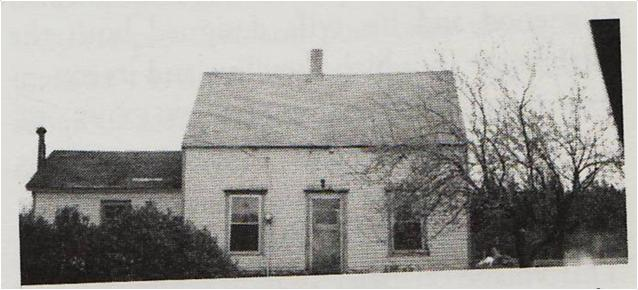
Until age 14, Alden Nowlan's home in Stanley

Stanley is the birthplace of renowned writer Alden Nowlan. Nowlan won the Governor General’s Award for poetry, and he is ranked alongside Canada's great poets. Nowlan grew up exposed to violence, alcoholism and poverty in precarious family circumstances. Self-educated for much of his life, he dropped out of school in grade five. He taught himself to read by befriending a librarian at the Library in Windsor; a plaque in the Windsor library is dedicated to him. He graduated as a teenager from a two-week program offered by the Folk School in the Kennetcook Hotel, Kennetcook, Nova Scotia (February 1953). First published at age 19, he went to work for the Hartland, New Brunswick Observer and later for the Saint John Telegraph-Journal.

== Community events ==
Stanley holds an annual Pumpkin weigh-off in September. Stanley Sport Aviation holds the Stanley Fly-in, typically during the Labour Day weekend.
