= Stanley Airport =

Airport in Nova Scotia, Canada

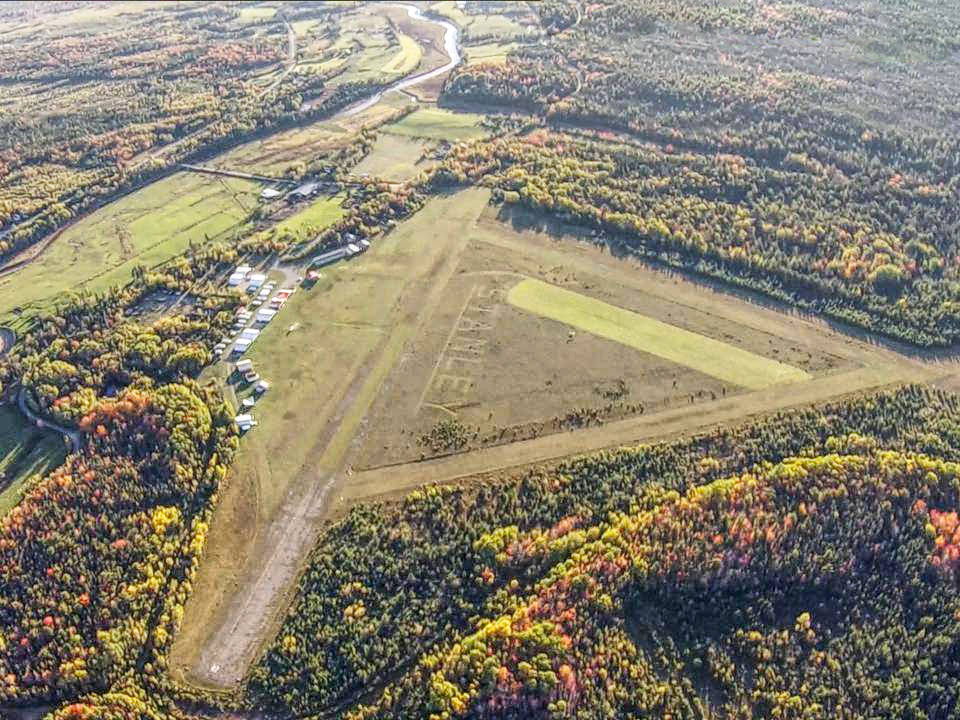
- Stanley Airport in 2018, looking southeast
- IATA: none; ICAO: none; TC LID: CCW4

Summary
- Airport type: Public
- Operator: Stanley Sport Aviation
- Location: Stanley, Nova Scotia
- Time zone: AST (UTC−04:00)
  - Summer (DST): ADT (UTC−03:00)
- Elevation AMSL: 95 ft (29 m)
- Coordinates: 45°06′02″N 063°55′14″W

Map
- Location in Nova Scotia

Runways
| Direction | Length | | Surface |
| Direction | ft | m | Surface |
|---|---|---|---|
| 02/20 | 1,900 | 579 | Grass |
| 09/27 | 2,600 | 792 | Grass / asphalt |
| 15/33 | 1,800 | 549 | Grass |
- Sources: Canada Flight Supplement

Stanley Airport (TC LID: CCW4) is a public airport located in Stanley, Hants County, Nova Scotia, Canada, approximately 12 nautical miles (22 km; 14 mi) northeast of Windsor.

== History ==
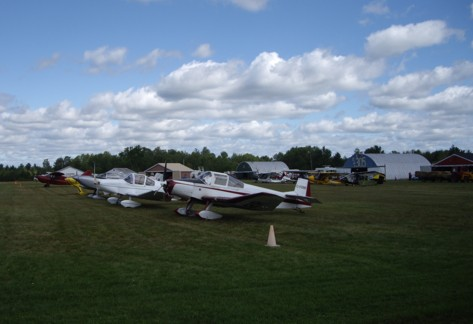
Stanley fly-in, 2007

=== World War II ===
Stanley was built as RCAF Station Stanley in March 1941 to train pilots as part of the British Commonwealth Air Training Plan. The airport was the base for the Royal Canadian Air Force's No. 17 Elementary Flying School which trained thousands of pilots for the Second World War. The school operated a number of Fleet Finch II Model 16B aircraft from 1941 through 1944, and two dozen de Havilland Tiger Moth aircraft to train pilots along with a Link Trainer, an early flight simulator equipped with gauges to simulate a real aircraft. At its peak Stanley trained four 30-student classes simultaneously for six weeks of flight training before graduates passed on to advanced training at other bases. The station was closed in January 1944 as the war came to a close.

==== Aerodrome ====
In approximately 1942 the aerodrome was listed as RCAF & D of T Aerodrome - Stanley, Nova Scotia at 45°06′N 63°55′W with a variation of 23 degrees west and elevation of 96 ft (29 m). The field was listed as "gravel" and had three runways listed as follows:

| Runway name | Length | Width | Surface |
|---|---|---|---|
| 11/29 | 2,700 ft (820 m) | 150 ft (46 m) | Gravel |
| 5/23 | 2,850 ft (870 m) | 150 ft (46 m) | Gravel |
| 17/35 | 2,850 ft (870 m) | 150 ft (46 m) | Hard Surfaced |

It was also noted in the above reference that at the time of publication, runway 5/23 was being extended to 5,000 ft (1,500 m) by 200 ft (61 m) this upgrade was under construction.

=== Post-war ===
The airport was taken over in 1968 by the Dartmouth Experimental Aircraft Association, which upgraded the runways and built some hangars. The association evolved into the Stanley Sport Aviation Association.

The Nova Scotia Department of Natural Resources used the airport's large World War II maintenance hangar after the war before turning it over to Stanley Sport Aviation. This distinctive wood hangar had a control tower at one corner and was once the largest building in Hants County. It was demolished in 2006 due to deterioration of the structure.

== Today ==
At present, the airport is home to Stanley Sport Aviation Association, a group of private aircraft owners and aviation enthusiasts who lease and maintain the field. The airport still has three runways built in the standard BCATP triangular pattern, although the wartime paving has been replaced by grass. The number of runways, close proximity to Halifax and the absence of landing fees make it popular with aviation enthusiasts. Every year over the Labour Day weekend, SSA hosts the annual Stanley Fly-In, which first took place in 1971 and is touted by the club as being the oldest fly-in in Canada. This fly-in is well known in the region, and attracts about 100 aircraft and 2000 visitors from across Canada and the north-eastern United States.
