= List of communities in Digby County, Nova Scotia =

List of communities in Digby County, Nova Scotia

Communities are ordered by the highway on which they are located, whose routes start after each terminus near the largest community.

== Trunk route ==
- Trunk 1: Smith's Cove - Weymouth North - Weymouth - New Edinburgh - Belliveaus Cove - Church Point - Little Brook - Comeauville - Saulnierville - Meteghan River - Meteghan - St. Alphonse de Clare - Mavillette - Salmon River - Beaver River

== Arterial highway ==
- Highway 101: Brighton - Barton - Plympton - Gilberts Cove - Marshalltown

== Collector roads ==
- Route 217: Digby - Rossway - Waterford -Lake Midway - Sandy Cove - Mink Cove - Little River - Tiddville - East Ferry - Tiverton - Central Grove - Freeport - Westport
- Route 340: Ohio - Weaver Settlement - Hassett - Havelock - Hilltown - New Tusket - Corberrie - Moody's Corner - Richfield

== Rural roads ==
- Acaciaville
- Bangor
- Bear Cove
- Bear River
- Cape St. Marys
- Concession
- Culloden
- Danvers
- Doucetteville
- Gullivers Cove
- Hainsfield
- Hectanooga
- Hillgrove
- Maxwellton Station
- Meteghan Station
- Morganville
- New Edinburgh
- New France
- North Range
- Plympton Station
- Riverdale
- Sissiboo Falls
- South Range
- Southville
- St. Joseph
- St. Martin de Clare
- Weymouth
- Weymouth Falls
