= Nova Scotia Route 217 =

Highway in Nova Scotia, Canada

Coordinates: 44.590°N 65.892°W

Route 217
- Digby Neck and Islands Scenic Drive

Route information
- Maintained by Nova Scotia Department of Transportation and Infrastructure Renewal
- Length: 64 km (40 mi)

Major junctions
- West end: Westport, Brier Island
- East end: Route 303 in Digby

Location
- Country: Canada
- Province: Nova Scotia
- Counties: Digby

Highway system
- Provincial highways in Nova Scotia; 100-series
← Route 216	→ Route 219

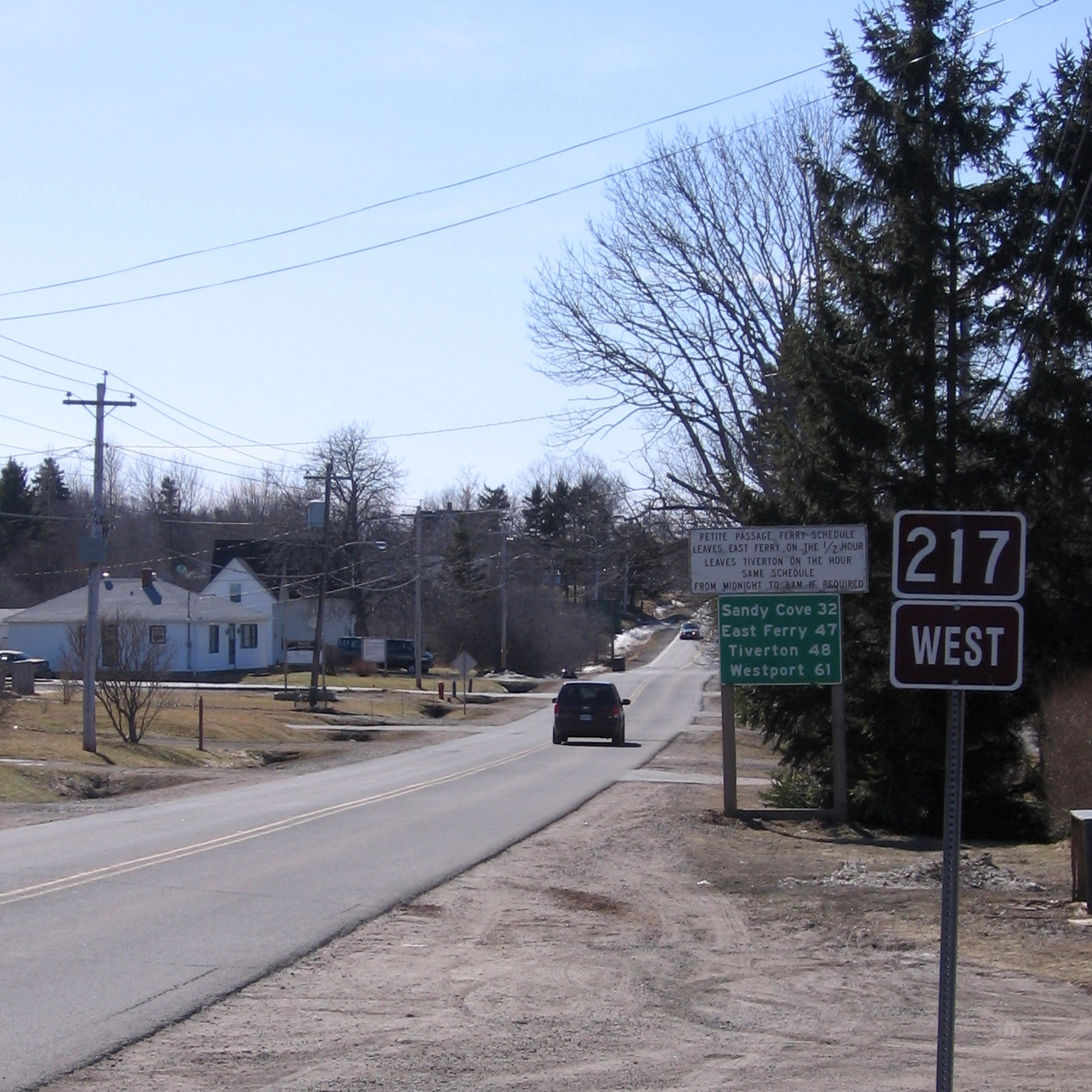
Nova Scotia Route 217 in Seabrook, just outside Digby, Nova Scotia

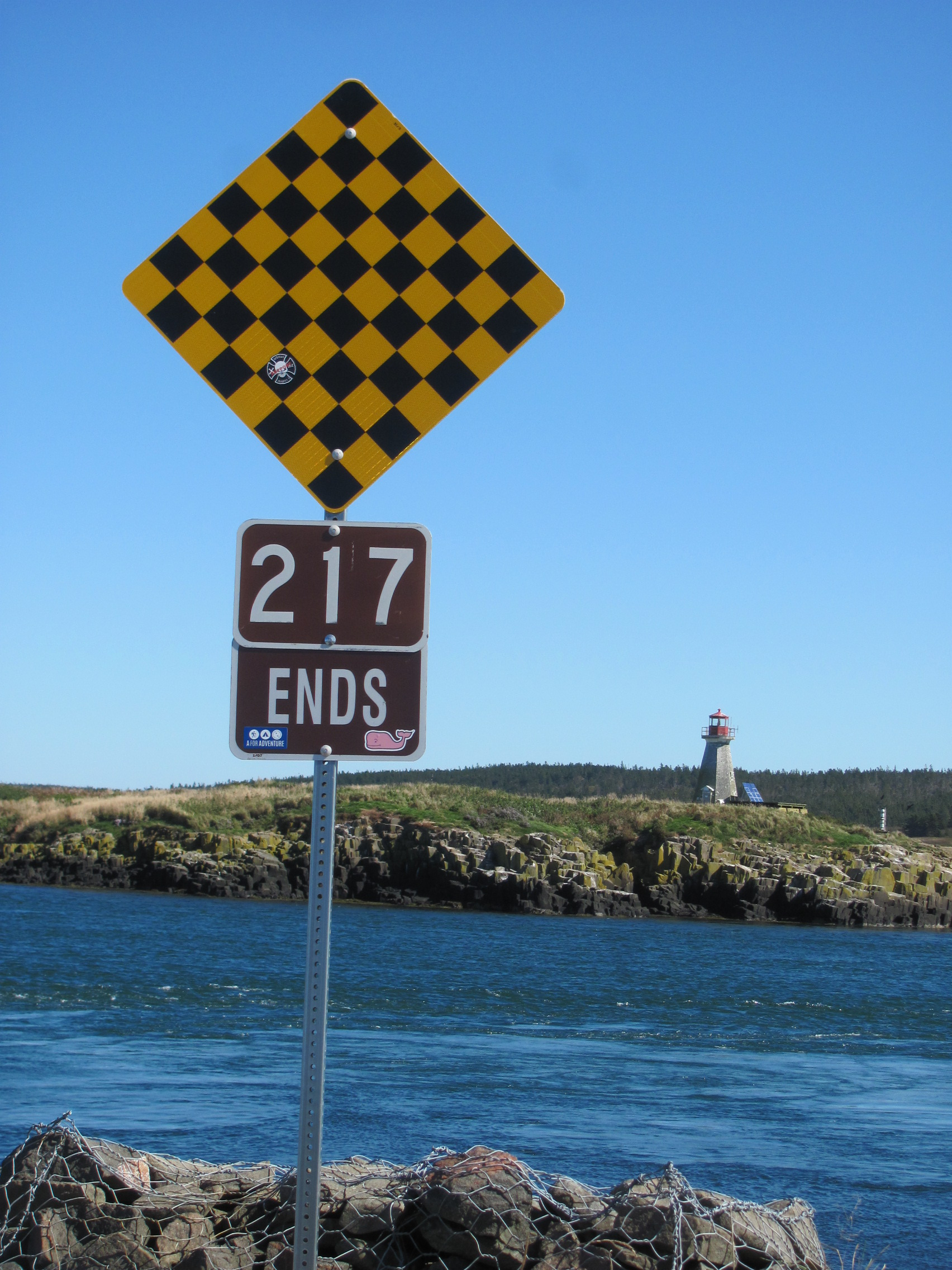
Western terminus of Route 217 (Water Street) in Westport, Brier Island, with the Peter Island Lighthouse in the background

Route 217 is a collector road in the Canadian province of Nova Scotia.

It is located in Digby County and connects Westport, Brier Island with Digby at Route 303.

It traverses the Digby Neck peninsula, as well as Long Island and includes short two ferry links, East Ferry to Tiverton and Freeport to Westport.

The road contains many scenic views and is marketed as the Digby Neck and Islands Scenic Drive with custom road signs. In summer it is heavily traveled by tourists seeking whale watching tours at the end of Digby Neck.

The western terminus is a look-off in Westport beside the Joshua Slocum monument with a view of Grand Passage and the Peter Island Lighthouse.

== Communities ==
Communities in italics are served by the route indirectly.

- Westport (Route 217 includes a short length of the southern half of Water Street in Westport, Brier Island.)
- Freeport
- Central Grove
- Gilberts Landing
- Tiverton
- East Ferry
- Tiddville
- Little River
- Mink Cove
- Sandy Cove
- Lake Midway
- Centreville
- Waterford
- Rossway
- Gullivers Cove
- Roxville
- Seabrook
- Digby

== History ==
Highway 217 was formerly designated Trunk Highway 17.

== See also ==
- List of Nova Scotia provincial highways
