= Ohio (disambiguation) =

Ohio is a U.S. state.

Ohio may also refer to:

== Places ==
=== Canada ===
- Ohio, Antigonish County
- Ohio, Digby, Nova Scotia
- Ohio, Shelburne, Nova Scotia, in the District of Shelbourne
- Ohio, Yarmouth, Nova Scotia

=== United States ===
- Ohio City, Colorado
- Ohio City, Ohio, a village in Van Wert County
- Ohio City, Cleveland, a neighborhood of Cleveland, Ohio
- Ohio Creek, in Gunnison County, Colorado
- Ohio, Illinois, a village
- Ohio, Missouri, an unincorporated community
- Ohio, New York, a town
- Ohio, Texas, an unincorporated community
- Ohio County (disambiguation)
- Ohio Country, a historical region in North America
- Ohio Township (disambiguation)
- Ohio River, a tributary of the Mississippi River
  - Ohio River Valley AVA, a wine region along the Ohio River
- Ohio State University, a university in Columbus, Ohio
- Ohio Territory (disambiguation)
- Ohio University, a university in Athens, Ohio
- Ohio Valley (disambiguation)

=== Other places ===
- 439 Ohio, an asteroid, the 439th asteroid registered

== Music ==
=== Albums ===
- Ohio (Over the Rhine album), 2003
- Ohio (Stalley album), 2014

=== Songs ===
- "Ohio" (1953 song), a song from the musical Wonderful Town
- "Ohio" (Crosby, Stills, Nash & Young song)
- "Ohio (Come Back to Texas)", a song by Bowling for Soup
- "Ohio", a song by Damien Jurado from Rehearsals for Departure
- "Ohio", a song by Modest Mouse from This Is a Long Drive for Someone with Nothing to Think About
- "Ohio", a song by The Black Keys
- "Ohio", a song by Utah Saints
- "Ohio", a song by Justice from Audio, Video, Disco
- "Ohio", a song by Isabelle Adjani, from Pull Marine
- "Ohio", a song by The Presidents of the United States of America from Kudos to You!
- "Swag Like Ohio", a song by Lil B
- "Ohio", a song by Patty Griffin from American Kid
- "Ohio", a song by Cherry Glazerr from Stuffed & Ready

== Ships ==
- List of ships named SS Ohio
- USS Ohio, several ships of the United States Navy
- Ohio-class submarine, a nuclear-powered ballistic missile submarines operated by the United States Navy
- Ohio, an American schooner that rescued two trapped crewmen of the capsized Canadian schooner Codseeker in 1877

== Other ==
- Ohio, a 2018 novel by Stephen Markley
- Ohio (meme), an internet meme and slang word

== See also ==
- Ohio Theatre (disambiguation)
- Ohayo (disambiguation)
- Ohia
