= Tri-County Regional Centre for Education =

School board in Nova Scotia, Canada

Address
- 79 Water Street, Yarmouth Nova Scotia, B5A 1L4; Canada

District information
- Established: April 1, 2018
- Regional Executive Director of Education: Jared Purdy
- Schools: 22
- Budget: CA$ million

Students and staff
- Students: 5,816 (2021-22)

Other information
- Mission Statement: We will ensure quality education for all our students enabling them to reach their full potential.
- Website: www.tcrce.ca

The Tri-County Regional Centre for Education (TCRCE) is the public school board responsible for elementary, junior high, and high schools in Digby County, Yarmouth County, and Shelburne County in Nova Scotia, Canada.

== History ==
The Southwest Regional School Board previously covered all schools in Digby County, Yarmouth County, Shelburne County, Queens County, and Lunenburg County. In the spring of 2000, a pilot project created two smaller district boards in the Southwest District School Board, the Tri-County District School Board and the South Shore Regional School Board which focused solely on classroom and education issues. An administrative structure was formed to provide financial, busing, building and other non- classroom services to both districts. On August 1, 2004, the province formed two separate Regional Boards out of the former Southwest Regional School Board, creating the Tri-County Regional School Board. The TCRCE was formed on April 1, 2018 through the Nova Scotia Education Reform Act.

== Schools ==
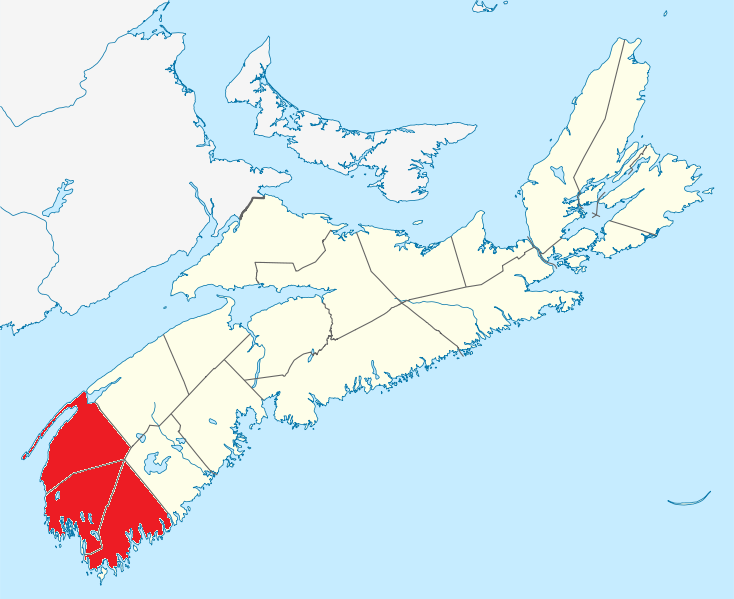
Coverage map of the school board

=== Digby County ===
==== All grades ====
- Islands Consolidated School (pr to 12); Freeport

==== Elementary schools ====
- Digby Elementary School (pr to 6); Digby
- Weymouth Consolidated School (pr to 6); Weymouth
- Digby Neck Consolidated School (pr to 6); Digby Neck

==== High schools ====
- Digby Regional High School (7 to 12); Digby
- St Mary's Bay Academy (7 to 12); Weymouth

=== Yarmouth County ===
==== All grades ====
- Drumlin Heights Consolidated School (pr to 12); Glenwood

==== Elementary schools ====
- Carleton Consolidated School (pr to 5); Carleton
- Meadowfields Community School (pr to 5); Yarmouth
- Plymouth School (pr to 5); Plymouth
- Port Maitland Consolidated Elementary School (pr to 5); Port Maitland
- Yarmouth Elementary School (pr to 5); Yarmouth

==== Junior high/middle schools ====
- Maple Grove Education Centre (6 to 8); Hebron

==== High schools ====
- Yarmouth Consolidated Memorial High School (9 to 12); Yarmouth

=== Shelburne County ===
==== Elementary schools ====
- Clark's Harbour Elementary School (pr to 6); Clark's Harbour
- Evelyn Richardson Memorial Elementary School (pr to 6); Shag Harbour
- Forest Ridge Academy (pr to 6); Barrington
- Hillcrest Academy (pr to 6); Shelburne
- Lockeport Elementary School (pr to 6); Lockeport

==== High schools ====
- Barrington Municipal High School (7 to 12); Barrington
- Lockeport Regional High School (7 to 12); Lockeport
- Shelburne Regional High School (7 to 12); Shelburne

== See also ==
- List of Nova Scotia schools
- Education in Canada
