= List of villages in Nova Scotia =

A village is a type of community in the Canadian Province of Nova Scotia that has a commission established under the Municipal Government Act for the purpose of providing municipal services to a defined area within a larger county or district municipality.

Nova Scotia has 21 villages. According to available population data, Nova Scotia's largest and smallest villages are Bible Hill and River Hebert with populations of 8,913 and 1,296 respectively.

== List ==
Name	Historical county	Rural municipality	Population (2011)	Population (2006)	Change (%)
Aylesford	Kings	Municipality of the County of Kings	2,408	2,445	−1.5
Baddeck	Victoria	Municipality of the County of Victoria	1,988	2,154	−8.4
Bible Hill	Colchester	Municipality of the County of Colchester	8,913	8,480	5.1
Canning	Kings	Municipality of the County of Kings	2,589	2,760	−6.6
Chester	Lunenburg	Municipality of the District of Chester	2,348	2,294	2.4
Cornwallis Square	Kings	Municipality of the County of Kings	1,877	1,941	−3.4
Dover	Guysborough	Municipality of the District of Guysborough	n/a	n/a	n/a
Freeport	Digby	Municipality of the District of Digby	n/a	n/a	n/a
Greenwood	Kings	Municipality of the County of Kings	5,369	5,289	1.5
Hebbville	Lunenburg	Municipality of the District of Lunenburg	n/a	n/a	n/a
Kingston	Kings	Municipality of the County of Kings	5,174	5,176	−0.0
Lawrencetown	Annapolis	Municipality of the County of Annapolis	1,739	1,793	−3.1
New Minas	Kings	Municipality of the County of Kings	5,135	5,055	1.2
Port Williams	Kings	Municipality of the County of Kings	1,703	1,766	−3.7
Pugwash	Cumberland	Municipality of the County of Cumberland	1,420	1,513	−6.5
River Hebert	Cumberland	Municipality of the County of Cumberland	1,296	1,330	−2.6
St. Peter's	Richmond	Municipality of the County of Richmond	1,492	1,453	2.7
Tatamagouche	Colchester	Municipality of the County of Colchester	2,037	2,070	−1.6
Tiverton	Digby	Municipality of the District of Digby	n/a	n/a	n/a
Westport	Digby	Municipality of the District of Digby	n/a	n/a	n/a
Weymouth	Digby	Municipality of the District of Digby	1,773	1,839	−3.7
Total villages	—	—	48,754	48,873	−0.2

== Former villages ==
Nova Scotia has recognized at least four other villages in its history. The villages of Brooklyn and Milton dissolved on April 1, 1996 upon the amalgamation of the Municipality of the County of Queens with the Town of Liverpool to form the Region of Queens Municipality. On the same date, the villages of Uplands Park and Waverley dissolved upon the amalgamation of the Municipality of the County of Halifax with the cities of Dartmouth and Halifax and the Town of Bedford to form the Halifax Regional Municipality. Havre Boucher was dissolved in 2018.

== See also ==
- Demographics of Nova Scotia
- Geography of Nova Scotia
- List of communities in Nova Scotia
- List of counties of Nova Scotia
- List of municipal districts in Nova Scotia
- List of municipalities in Nova Scotia
- List of towns in Nova Scotia
