= Weymouth, Nova Scotia =

Weymouth
- Village
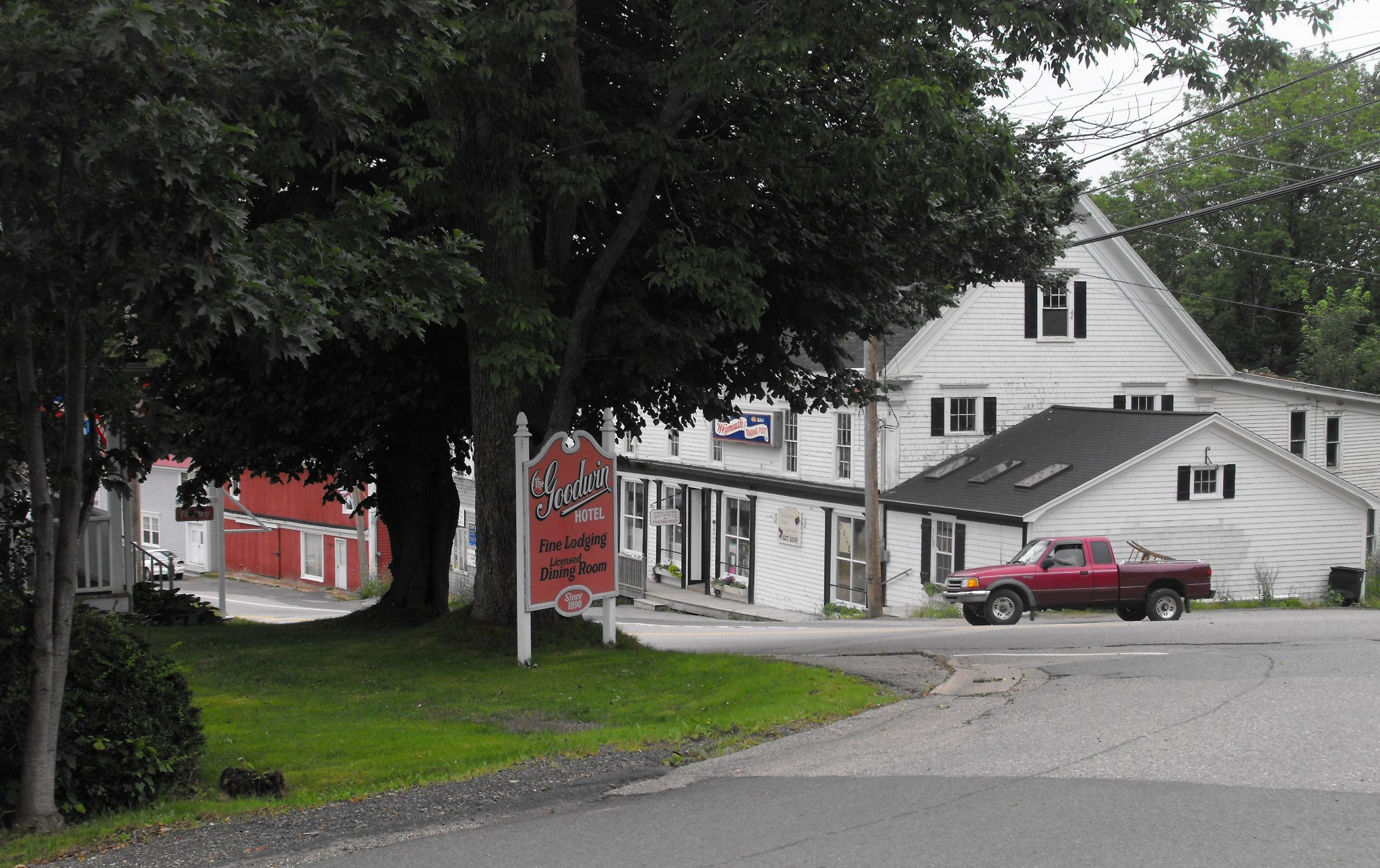
- Weymouth street scene

- Location of Weymouth in Nova Scotia
- Coordinates: 44.40489°N 65.99861°W
- Country: Canada
- Province: Nova Scotia
- County: Digby
- Founded: 1783
- Electoral Districts Federal: Acadie—Annapolis
- Provincial: Clare-Digby

Government
  - Governing Body: Weymouth Village Commission
  - Chair: Irwin Gaudett
  - MLA: Jill Balser (PC)
  - MP: Chris d'Entremont (C)
- Time zone: ATS
- Postal Code: B0W
- Area code: +1-902-837
- Website: The Village Of Weymouth

Weymouth is a rural village in the Canadian province of Nova Scotia, located in Digby County on the Sissiboo River near its terminus on Baie Ste. Marie.

== History ==
The area was settled in the 1760s by New England Planters. The town was formally founded by Loyalist James Moody in 1783 (the year that the Treaty of Paris was signed to end the American Revolution). Current-day Weymouth was once called Weymouth Bridge, and Weymouth North was called Weymouth. Weymouth is supposed to have been named in honour of the previous settlement of the Strickland family from Weymouth, Massachusetts.

Shipping and shipbuilding were the main industry in the mid-19th century. Remnants of docks can be seen on the Northeast side of the Sissiboo today. Goods such as lumber were loaded on ships at these docks and shipped all over the world. Until recently, Weymouth housed the oldest general store in Eastern Canada. Opened in 1837, the store was called The Trading Post, but closed in 2009. The village also housed one of the original offices of the Merchants Bank of Halifax (later renamed Royal Bank of Canada), until they shut down. This building is now part of the aforementioned Weymouth Trading Post building. The Dominion Atlantic Railway stopped running through Weymouth in March 1990.

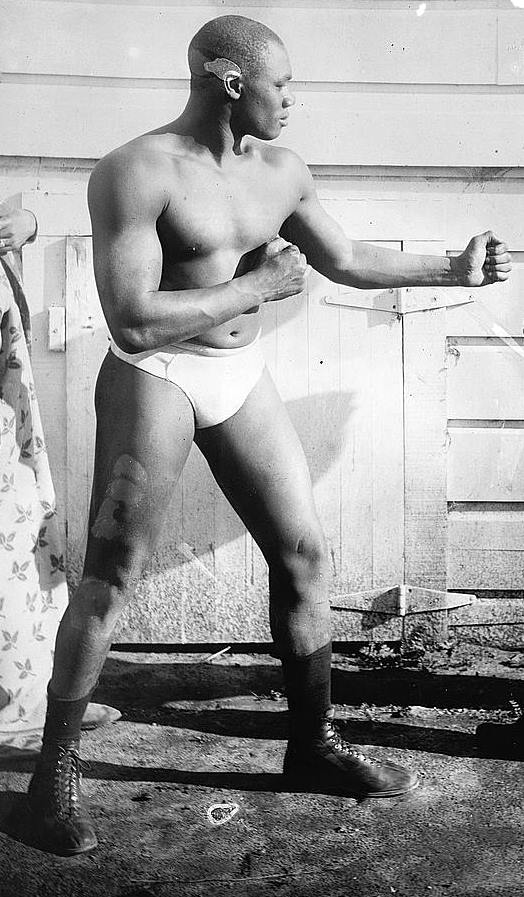
Sam Langford

Nearby Weymouth Falls was home to one of the world's greatest boxers, Sam Langford (1886–1956). Although he was never officially crowned World Champion, he held titles from England, Spain and Mexico.

=== Disasters ===
On 4 August 1909, 2 churches, a hotel, and several other buildings were destroyed by unknown fire. On 2 October 1929 a fire started in the general store of Captain R.D. Barkhouse and swept through the downtown area destroying 25 buildings including retail shops, factories, and private homes. It was estimated that the fire caused approximately $250,000 in damages. No serious injuries or deaths occurred because of the fire. On 6 February 1958, another fire destroyed the boat and furniture plants of Weymouth Industries Ltd., and in June 1959 six businesses were wiped out due to fire.

The Sissiboo River overflowed in March 2003, flooding the town under almost two feet of water.

In 2017 one of the oldest buildings in Canada located in Weymouth was destroyed by fire. The blaze also consumed another building and it damaged three other buildings. It took nine Fire Departments and over 130 firefighters to contain the fire.

=== New France ("Electric City") ===
The lumber community of New France, located about 12 miles (19 km) inland from Weymouth, was founded by the Stehelin family who came to the area from Normandy, France in 1892. The community they established was notable for its early use of hydroelectric power generation, earning it the local nickname "The Electric City". Also notable was the Stehelin family's railroad, the Weymouth and New France Railway, constructed using logs as tracks, which they used to bring lumber to the company wharf at Weymouth. As many as 1.5 million board feet of timber were shipped annually from New France to South America and England. The railway was destroyed by fire in 1907 and the business ceased not long afterwards. There is little left of New France except for the foundations of the city buildings. J.D. Irving, recent owners of the land, established walking trails and interpretive signs at the site and fixed the foundations so they are safe for visitors to explore. The lands were purchased by the province of Nova Scotia on 3 February 2010, thus assuring the protection of this unusual part of the province.

== Geography ==
Modern day Weymouth straddles the Sissiboo River. This river swells approximately every six hours as salt water backs up from the high tides of the Bay of Fundy into St. Mary's Bay.

Weymouth is situated on the border between the provincial electoral districts of Clare and Digby-Annapolis. It is located 33 kilometres from Digby, 72 kilometres from Yarmouth and 250 kilometres from the capital of Nova Scotia, Halifax.

Smaller villages surrounding Weymouth proper are Weymouth Falls, Weaver Settlement, Ohio, Southville, Riverdale, Danvers, Hassett, Saint Bernard and New Edinburgh.

Two exits (27 and 28) on Highway 101 are the primary access to the town. Trunk 1 runs through the village and was the main thoroughfare from the Annapolis Valley to Yarmouth prior to the construction of Highway 101.

=== Climate ===
Weymouth has a humid continental climate influenced by its maritime position. It is shielded from some Atlantic influence by having a landmass between itself and the main ocean, but it is still moderated compared to areas in the interior of the continent.

Climate data for Weymouth
Month	Jan	Feb	Mar	Apr	May	Jun	Jul	Aug	Sep	Oct	Nov	Dec	Year
Record high °C (°F)	19 (66)	17.5 (63.5)	22 (72)	24 (75)	30.6 (87.1)	33 (91)	32.5 (90.5)	33 (91)	29.4 (84.9)	25.5 (77.9)	23 (73)	18.3 (64.9)	33 (91)
Mean daily maximum °C (°F)	0.3 (32.5)	0.6 (33.1)	4.6 (40.3)	10 (50)	16.1 (61.0)	20.8 (69.4)	23.7 (74.7)	23.4 (74.1)	19.1 (66.4)	13.7 (56.7)	8.2 (46.8)	3.2 (37.8)	12 (54)
Mean daily minimum °C (°F)	−7.8 (18.0)	−7.8 (18.0)	−4.1 (24.6)	0.7 (33.3)	5.3 (41.5)	9.9 (49.8)	13.1 (55.6)	12.7 (54.9)	8.8 (47.8)	4.5 (40.1)	0.8 (33.4)	−4.5 (23.9)	2.6 (36.7)
Record low °C (°F)	−24.4 (−11.9)	−28.3 (−18.9)	−23.5 (−10.3)	−11.7 (10.9)	−5.6 (21.9)	−1.1 (30.0)	2.8 (37.0)	2.5 (36.5)	−3 (27)	−6.7 (19.9)	−13 (9)	−25 (−13)	−28.3 (−18.9)
Average precipitation mm (inches)	131.9 (5.19)	97.7 (3.85)	109.5 (4.31)	97 (3.8)	107.5 (4.23)	91.9 (3.62)	97.4 (3.83)	79.4 (3.13)	111.9 (4.41)	104.8 (4.13)	125.2 (4.93)	141 (5.6)	1,295.2 (50.99)
Source: Environment Canada

== Economy ==
Fur farming, especially mink, fishing, and logging were once the principal industries in the area.

== Demographics ==
The Village of Weymouth comprises many different ethnic backgrounds. Primarily populated by descendants of the loyalists, African-Canadian and White, it also is home to a few Acadians, Mi'kmaq and people of German ancestry.

== Weymouth in fiction ==
Author Josephine Leslie (pseudonym R. A. Dick) frequently summer vacationed in Weymouth North. During her visits she would imagine living during Weymouth's heyday (age of sail) and was inspired to write "The Ghost and Mrs. Muir".

Weymouth and Weymouth Falls appear mythologized in George Elliott Clarke's poetical work Whylah Falls (1990).
