= Sissiboo River =

Watercourse in Nova Scotia, Canada

Coordinates: 44°24′44.6″N 66°0′21.2″W

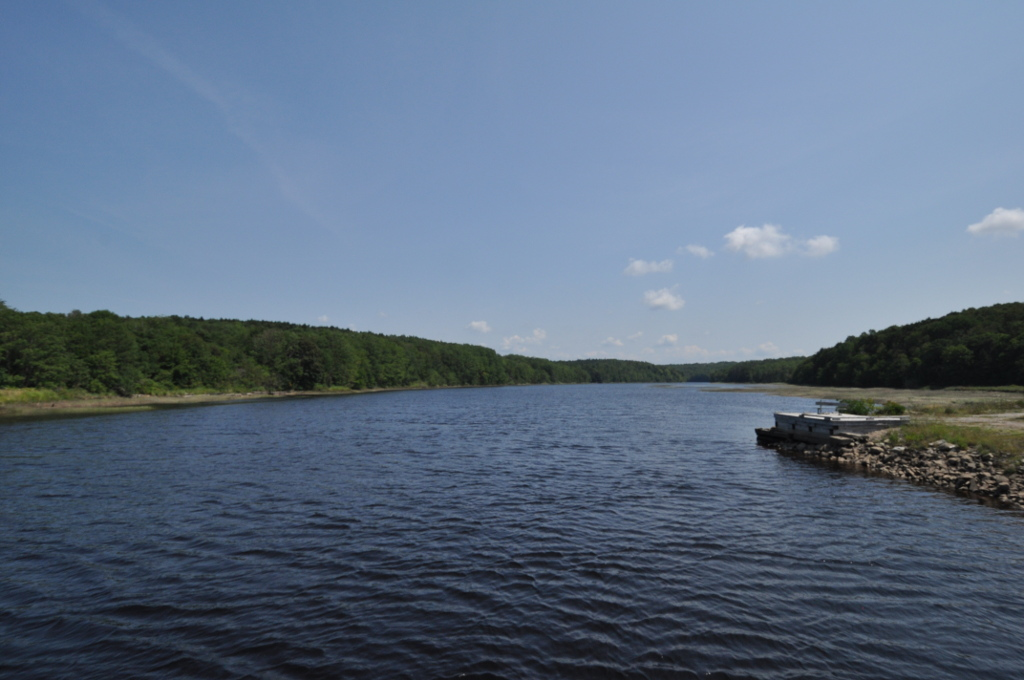
- Sissiboo River, Weymouth, Nova Scotia

Location
- Country: Canada
- Region: Nova Scotia
- District: Digby County

Physical characteristics
- Source: Chain of lakes (First through Ninth Lakes)
  - location: near the Annapolis County border
- Mouth: St. Mary's Bay
  - location: near New Edinburgh
- Length: 97 km (60 mi)
- Basin size: 596 km^{2} (230 sq mi)

The Sissiboo River is a river located in Digby County, Nova Scotia, Canada.

== Etymology ==
The origins of the name "Sissiboo" are not known. The most credible is a derivation from the Mi'kmaq word for river, "Seboo." Isiah Wilson states that the name derives from a combination of the French numeral six (pronounced as seeks) and hibou (pronounced eeboo) meaning owl; the story being that a Frenchman and a First Nations person were on the river and observed six owls flying over, though Hamilton describes this story as "apocryphal". Another story is that the village at the mouth of the river was originally called Sissiboo, after first nation word meaning Big River, but it was changed to Weymouth as the settlers who arrived there came from Weymouth in Massachusetts.

== Course ==
The river flows out of a chain of lakes near the border with Annapolis County, named respectively, First, Second, Third, Fourth, Fifth, Sixth, Seventh, Eighth and Ninth Lakes. The Sissiboo River follows a winding course, draining a large area and passing through the former lumbering communities of Weymouth Falls and Weymouth Mills. The river travels for 97 kilometres (60 mi) and drains an area of 596 square kilometres (230 sq mi).

The Sissiboo becomes tidal at Weymouth and its estuary is called Weymouth Harbour. The river empties into St. Mary's Bay.

== Infrastructure ==
Trunk 1 crosses the river in Weymouth. An inactive Dominion Atlantic Railway bridge was demolished in 2012. Further downstream, Highway 101 crosses near the fishing community of New Edinburgh.

The river currently is obstructed by four dams, three of which are used to generate hydroelectricity: Weymouth Falls, Sissiboo Falls, which were built between 1958 and 1962, and Fourth Lake, which was built in 1983.

== See also ==
- List of rivers of Nova Scotia
