= Frederick A. Robicheau =

Canadian politician

Frederick Armand Robicheau (1785 – April 18, 1863 in Corberrie, NS) was a political figure in Nova Scotia. He represented Annapolis County in the Nova Scotia House of Assembly from 1836 to 1840. Simon d'Entremont and Robicheau are believed to be the first Acadians elected to a legislative assembly in North America.

== Biography ==
He was the son of Armand Robicheau and Rosalie Bourque. Robicheau settled at Corberrie near Weymouth in Digby County, where he married Marguerite Melanson. He was named a justice of the peace in 1839. Robicheau ran for reelection in Clare township in 1840 but was defeated by Anselm-François Comeau.

His brother Mathurin Robicheau also served in the provincial assembly.

Robichaud could express himself well in French, English and Micmac, and was respected among his peers. He accompanied Monsignor Plessis as he made his way through the region in 1815 and was designated Justice of the Peace and Captain of the Militia in his battalion of Clare. Robichaud was named to the post of magistrate. Incidentally, four Robichauds are among the first magistrates of Clare: Frederick Robichaud, Bonaventure Robichaud, Mathurin Robichaud and Zuentic Robichaud. Frederick became the first Acadian Deputy elected to the legislature of Nova Scotia in 1836. On February 24, 1837, Frederic addressed the government requesting that Annapolis County be divided into two distinct counties, Digby and Annapolis. His request was granted. He represented the county of Annapolis until 1840.
