= Nova Scotia Route 340 =

Highway in Nova Scotia, Canada

Route 340

Route information
- Maintained by Nova Scotia Department of Transportation and Infrastructure Renewal
- Length: 80 km (50 mi)

Major junctions
- South end: Trunk 1 in Hebron
- Hwy 101 in Hebron; Route 203 in Carleton
- North end: Trunk 1 in Weymouth

Location
- Country: Canada
- Province: Nova Scotia
- Counties: Yarmouth, Digby

Highway system
- Provincial highways in Nova Scotia; 100-series
← Route 337	→ Route 341

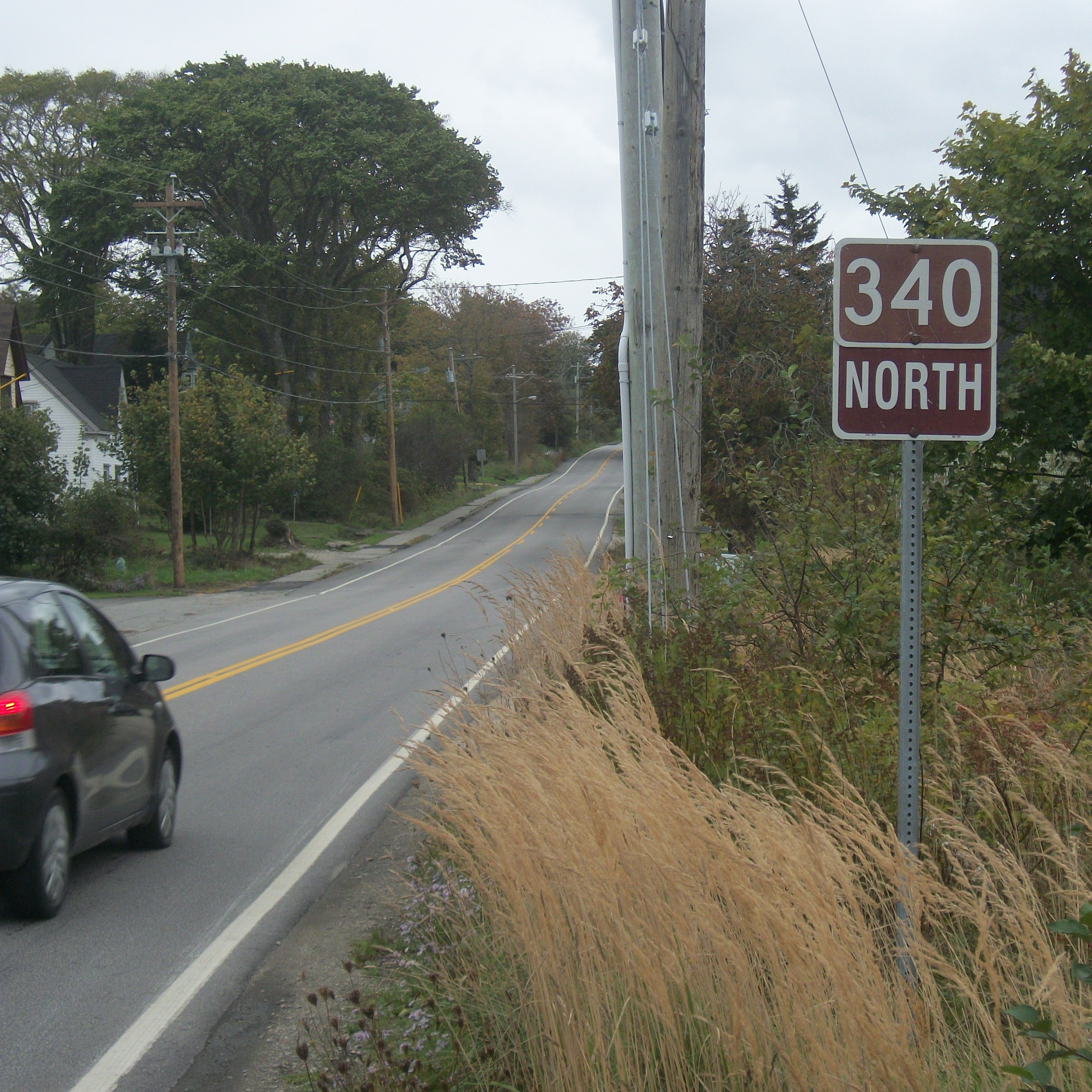
Route 340 in Hebron, Yarmouth County, Nova Scotia

Route 340 is a collector road in the Canadian province of Nova Scotia.

It is located in the western part of the province and connects Hebron at Trunk 1 with Weymouth at Trunk 1.

== Communities ==
- Hebron
- Deerfield
- Weaver Settlement
- Carleton
- Richfield
- Pleasant Valley
- Forest Glen
- Corberrie
- Weymouth

== History ==
Before 1970, Route 340 was called Trunk Route 40.

== See also ==
- List of Nova Scotia provincial highways
