= Ohio, Nova Scotia =

Ohio, Nova Scotia may refer to one of the following communities in Canada:

- Ohio, Antigonish County, in Antigonish County
- Ohio, Digby, Nova Scotia, in Digby County
- Ohio, Shelburne, Nova Scotia, in the District of Shelbourne
- South Ohio, in Yarmouth County
