= Harold Theriault =

Canadian politician (1953–2026)

Harold Elwood 'Junior' Theriault

MLA for Digby-Annapolis
- In office August 5, 2003 – October 8, 2013
- Preceded by: Gordon Balser
- Succeeded by: riding dissolved

Personal details
- Born: January 22, 1953 Digby, Nova Scotia, Canada
- Died: May 7, 2026 (aged 73)
- Party: Liberal
- Spouse: Dianne
- Occupation: Fisherman

Harold Elwood 'Junior' Theriault (January 22, 1953 – May 7, 2026) was a Canadian politician who was a member of the Nova Scotia House of Assembly, representing the riding of Digby-Annapolis for the Nova Scotia Liberal Party from 2003 to 2013.

== Early life ==
Born in Digby, the son of the late Harold Theriault and Christina Stanton, he was raised in East Ferry. Before entering public life, Theriault was employed in the commercial fishery for over 35 years. He was actively involved in fisheries issues and served his community on many local organizations.

== Political career ==
Theriault was first elected in the 2003 election, and was re-elected in 2006 and 2009.

On June 29, 2012, Theriault announced that he would not reoffer in the 2013 provincial election.

== Personal life and death ==
Theriault and his wife, Dianne, had five children. He died on May 7, 2026, at the age of 73.
