= Conway, Nova Scotia =

Community in Nova Scotia, Canada

Conway
- Community
- Location of Conway, Nova Scotia
- Coordinates: 44°35′46.81″N 65°46′4.26″W
- Country: Canada
- Province: Nova Scotia
- County: Digby
- Municipal District: Digby

Conway is a community in the Canadian province of Nova Scotia, located in The Municipality of the District of Digby in Digby County.
