= Central Grove, Nova Scotia =

Community in Nova Scotia, Canada

Coordinates: 44°20′41.44″N 66°15′28.29″W

Central Grove in Nova Scotia

Central Grove is a community in the Canadian province of Nova Scotia, located in the Municipality of the District of Digby in Digby County on Long Island.
