= Brighton, Digby, Nova Scotia =

Community in Nova Scotia, Canada

Coordinates: 44°33′22.42″N 65°51′13.56″W

Brighton in Nova Scotia

Brighton is a community in the Canadian province of Nova Scotia, located in the Municipality of the District of Digby in Digby County.
