= South Range =

South Range may refer to:

- South Range, Michigan, a village
- South Range, Nova Scotia, a community
- South Range, Wisconsin, an unincorporated community
- South Range Local School District, a school district in Mahoning County, Ohio
