= Long Island (Nova Scotia) =

Island in Digby County, Nova Scotia, Canada

Coordinates: 44°19′35″N 66°16′22″W

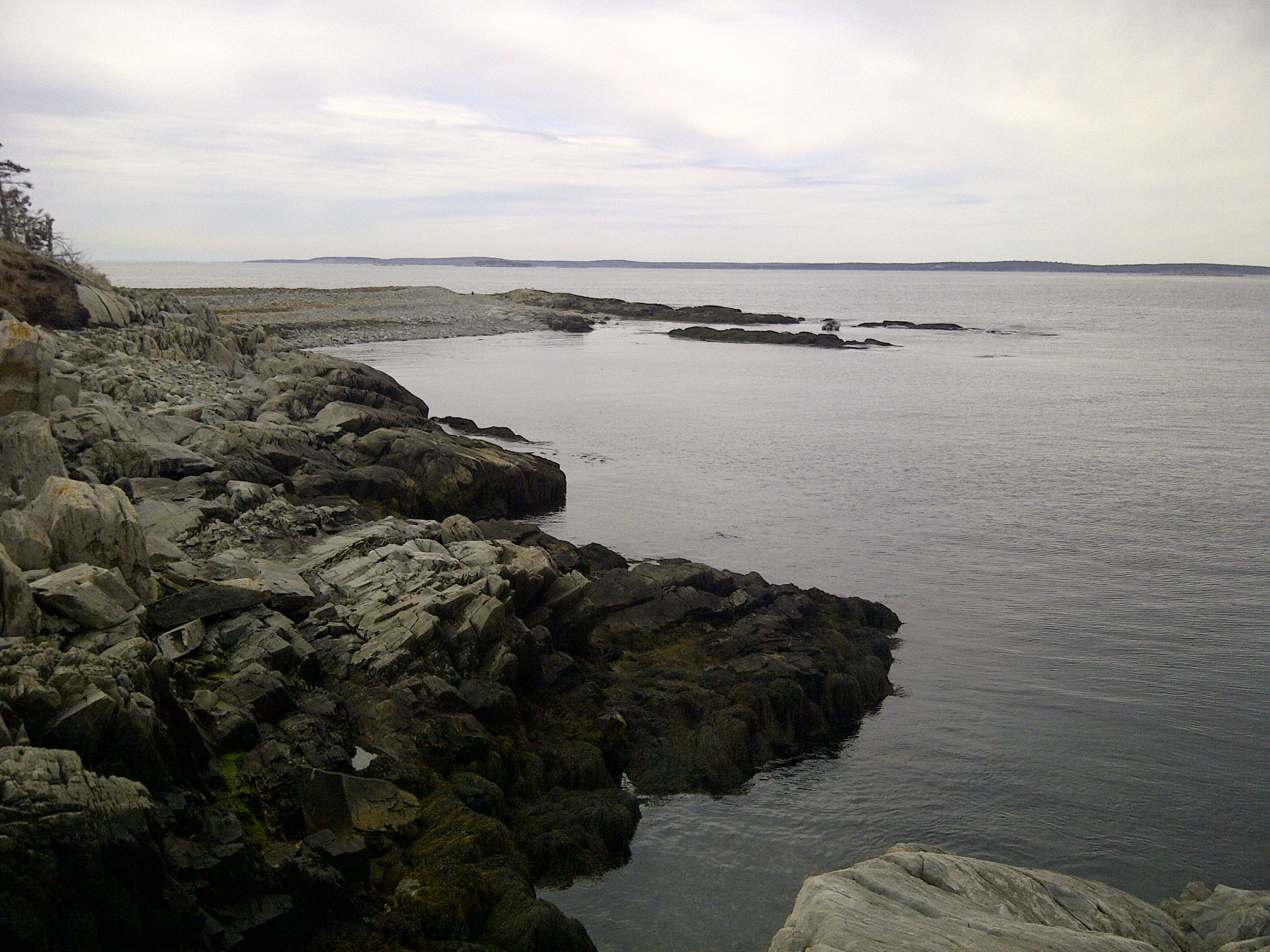
Long Island looking northward

Location in the Bay of Fundy
Long Island in relation to Digby Neck and Brier Island

Long Island is a Canadian island in Digby County, Nova Scotia.

Situated in the Bay of Fundy immediately southwest of the Digby Neck, Brier Island is located immediately west. Long Island is separated from the Digby Neck by the "Petit Passage" and from Brier Island by the "Grand Passage".

Route 217 runs the length of Long Island from the ferry crossing at Tiverton at the eastern end of the island (connecting to East Ferry on the Digby Neck) to the ferry crossing at Freeport at the western end of the island (connecting to Westport).

Long Island is approximately 15 km long and 5 km wide and is primarily basalt rock of the North Mountain ridge. The southern coast (St. Mary's Bay side) of the island is mostly faced with steep cliffs with the north coast (Bay of Fundy side) featuring smaller cliffs and round-rock beaches. There are several coves along both sides with Bear Cove (in Tiverton), Israel's Cove (also known as Pirate's Cove, located in Tiverton), Flour Cove (central on the island), and Beautiful Cove (in Freeport) being the best known and easily accessed coves.

The forest capability of Brier and Long Island is limited by shallow bedrock and severe exposure.

There are two shallow lakes located together in the centre of the island with a small brook leading in either directions and ending on either end of the island, one in Tiverton and the other in Freeport.

There is a tidal bore that occurs on the outgoing (ebb) tide in St. Mary's Bay just south of Petit Passage that is commonly referred to as The Bull.

Long Island was first discovered by the explorer Samuel de Champlain in 1604 but was not settled until the late 18th century when the land was granted to British loyalists who fought for the British against the Americans in the American Revolution.

The primary industry is lobster catching with a season running from the last Monday in November until the last day of May. A second, and growing industry, is tourism. The Bay of Fundy is known for whale watching and Long Island offers several tour operator throughout the summer months. Another attraction is Balancing Rock on the southern shore outside Tiverton, a large basalt column that appears to be balancing on its end.

It also has commonly-sighted deer, sea birds, and as of 2013 a bear which had not previously been seen for a century. Sometimes whales can be seen from the water's edge.

Ferry leaving from Tiverton, Nova Scotia going to Digby Neck

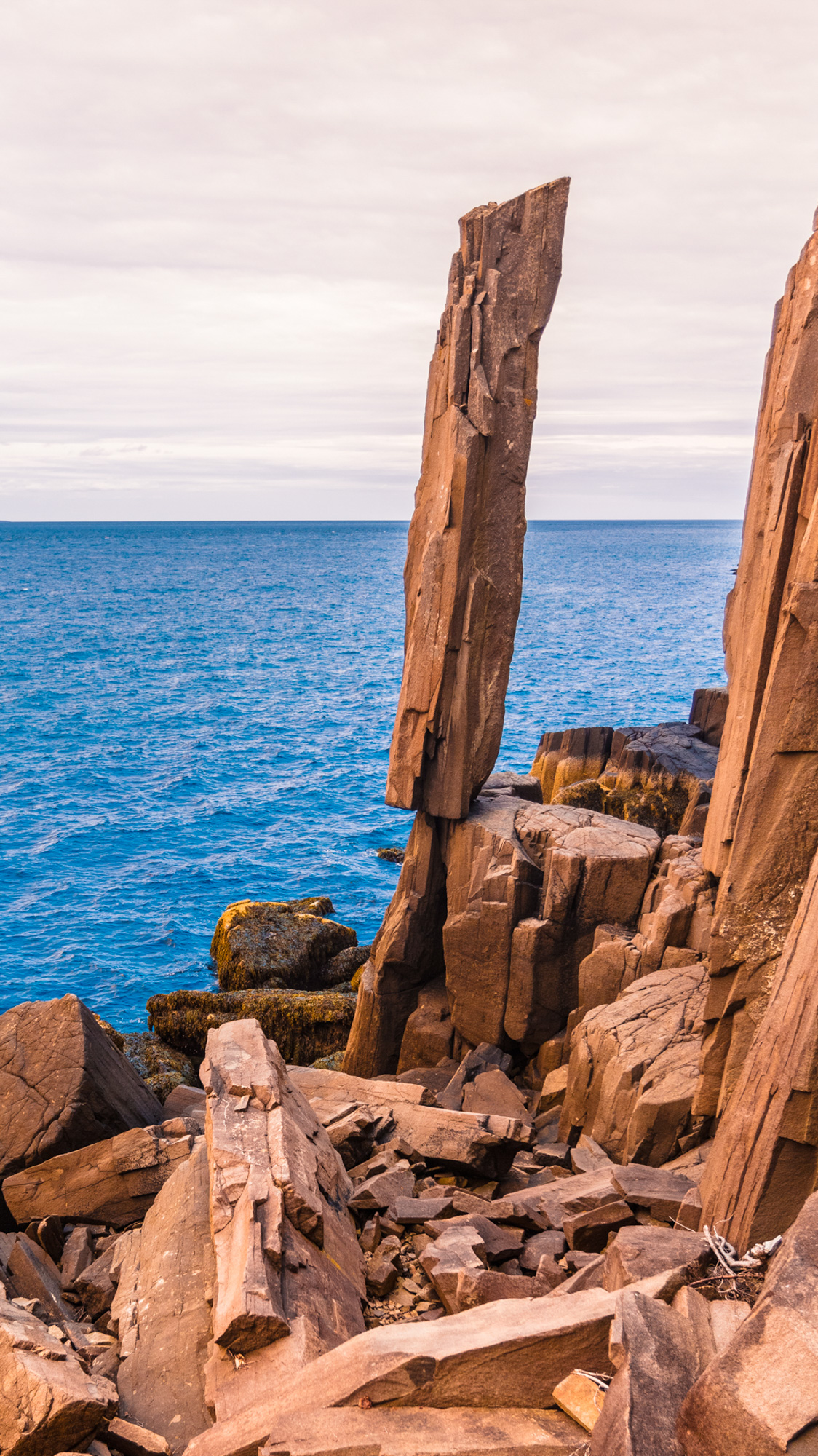
The Balancing Column on Long Island

In 1986, the Islands Historical Society was formed as a registered charity to preserve and promote Long and Brier Islands.

== See also ==
- Volcanism of Eastern Canada
