= Sissiboo Falls, Nova Scotia =

Community in Nova Scotia, Canada

Coordinates: 44°25′59.18″N 65°51′58.98″W

Sissiboo Falls in Nova Scotia

Sissiboo Falls is a community in the Canadian province of Nova Scotia, located in the Municipality of the District of Digby in Digby County.
