= Weymouth Falls, Nova Scotia =

Weymouth Falls
- Community
- Location within Canada Location within Nova Scotia
- Coordinates: 44°24′13″N 65°56′38″W
- Country: Canada
- Province: Nova Scotia
- Municipality: Digby County
- Time zone: UTC−4 (AST)
  - Summer (DST): UTC−3 (ADT)
- GNBC Code: CBOMG

Weymouth Falls is a Black Nova Scotian settlement within the District of Clare in Digby County, located in the Canadian province of Nova Scotia.

== History ==
The community was established by African-Canadians in the 1780s, near the village of Weymouth. Initially established by Black Loyalists, they were later joined by Maroons and other groups of Caribbeans of African descent. The original Baptist church in Weymouth Falls was among the first seven established in the province as part of the African United Baptist Association (AUBA) in 1854. Its replacement, Mount Beulah Baptist Church was erected in 1921. St. Matthew’s Anglican Church was purchased from a Yarmouth congregation in 1902. The building was moved to Weymouth Falls and reassembled by Anglican members of the community. St. Matthew's has a unique designation as the only Anglican Church in Canada to have an all black congregation. The area was once home to a prosperous lumber industry, with the community remaining agriculturally based to this day.

== Demographics ==
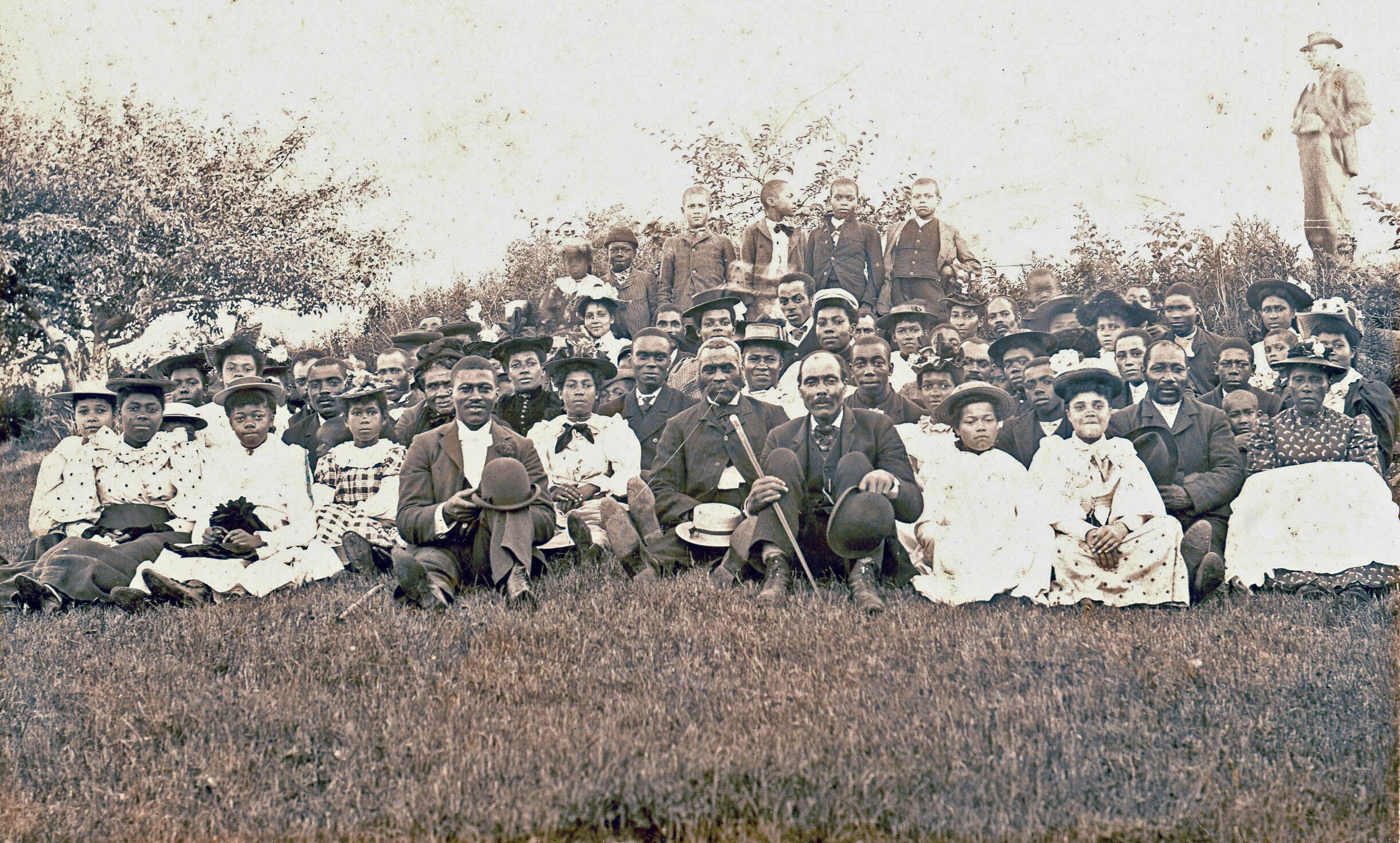
The congregation of Weymouth Falls African Baptist Church at a picnic sometime around 1900.

The number of black residents in Weymouth Falls has declined from 295 in 2001, to 115 in 2016.

== Notable residents ==
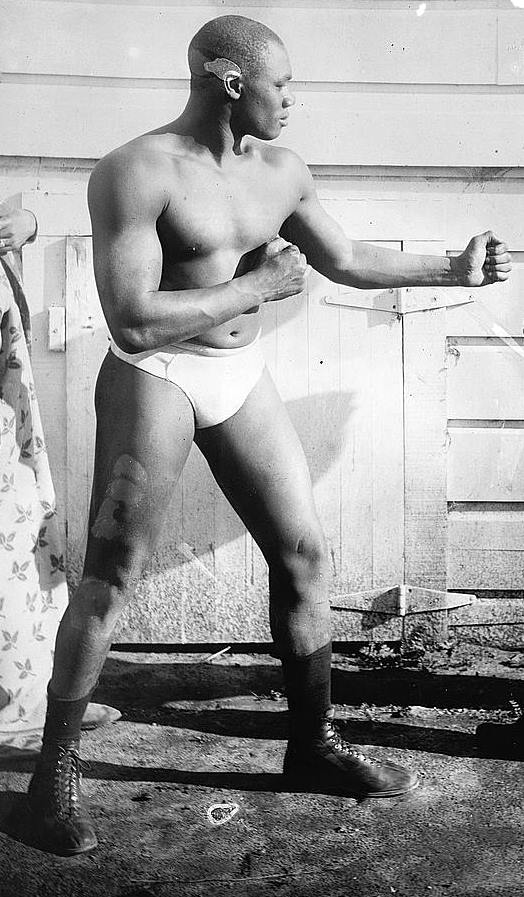
Sam Langford

Weymouth Falls is the birthplace of one of the world's greatest boxers, Sam Langford (1886–1956). Although he was never officially crowned World Champion, he held titles from England, Spain and Mexico. In 1972, Weymouth Falls erected a plaque to his memory at its community centre. In 1996, the Historic Sites and Monuments Board of Canada recognized his contribution to Canadian sports by rating Langford as one of the top ten boxers of the 20th century.

== In popular culture ==
- In 1985, the community was thrust into the national spotlight when Graham Jarvis, a black man, was shot and killed by Jeff Mullen, a white man from nearby Weaver Settlement. Both Mullen and Jarvis had been drinking and playing pool at Mullen’s house when Mullen went to his outhouse, retrieved a shotgun borrowed from his brother-in-law and fired Jarvis from roughly two metres away. The shot punctured Jarvis’s leg near the waist, and severed an artery. Jarvis stumbled, then crawled into the middle of Highway 340, where a crowd of onlookers gathered as he bled to death. Mullen was found not guilty after a four-day trial in front of an all-white jury. Presiding Judge John J. Nichols told the Toronto Star that he would not have allowed the case to go to trial if he had known all of the facts and stated, "You know what happens when those black guys start drinking."
- Whylah Falls (1990), a poetic novel written by author George Elliott Clarke takes place in Weymouth Falls.

== Climate ==
Climate data for 1981 to 2010 Canadian Climate Normals for Weymouth Falls
Month	Jan	Feb	Mar	Apr	May	Jun	Jul	Aug	Sep	Oct	Nov	Dec	Year
Mean daily maximum °C (°F)	0.2 (32.4)	1.2 (34.2)	4.5 (40.1)	10.5 (50.9)	16.3 (61.3)	21.1 (70.0)	23.9 (75.0)	23.7 (74.7)	19.4 (66.9)	19.0 (66.2)	8.5 (47.3)	3.2 (37.8)	12.6 (54.7)
