= Clare-Digby =

Nova Scotia electoral district

Defunct provincial electoral district
- Legislature: Nova Scotia House of Assembly
- District created: 2012
- Last contested: 2017

Demographics
- Population (2016): 17,323
- Electors (2017): 14,486
- Area (km²): 2,521.00
- Census division: Digby County
- Census subdivision(s): Municipality of Clare, Town of Digby, Municipality of the District of Digby

Clare-Digby was a provincial electoral district in Nova Scotia, Canada, that elected one member of the Nova Scotia House of Assembly. The riding was created in 2012 with 100 per cent of the former district of Clare and 76 per cent of the former district of Digby-Annapolis. It encompasses all of Digby County and consists of the Municipality of Clare, the Town of Digby, and the Municipality of the District of Digby. The riding is home to the province's only French-language university, Université Sainte-Anne at Church Point, and North America's oldest Acadian festival. Lobster and scallop catches in St. Mary's Bay and along the Fundy coast are critical to the economy.

== Members of the Legislative Assembly ==
This riding has elected the following members of the Legislative Assembly:

Clare-Digby
Legislature	Years	Member	Party
District created from Clare and Digby-Annapolis
62nd	2013–2017	Gordon Wilson	Liberal
63rd	2017–2021	Gordon Wilson	Liberal
District dissolved into Clare and Digby-Annapolis

== Election results ==
2017 Nova Scotia general election
Party	Candidate	Votes	%	±%
Liberal	Gordon Wilson	4,044	50.49	-4.19
Progressive Conservative	Norm Cormier	2,283	28.51	-2.57
New Democratic	Harold Neil	1,682	21.00	+12.01
Total valid votes		8,009	100.0	
Total rejected ballots		116	1.43	+0.43
Turnout		8,125	56.54	-10.34
Eligible voters		14,370		
Liberal hold		Swing		-0.81
Source: Elections Nova Scotia

2013 Nova Scotia general election
Party	Candidate	Votes	%
Liberal	Gordon Wilson	5,122	54.68
Progressive Conservative	Paul Emile LeBlanc	2,911	31.08
New Democratic	Dean Kenley	842	8.99
Independent	Ian Thurber	492	5.25
Total valid votes		9,367	100.00
Total rejected ballots		95	1.00
Turnout		9,462	66.88
Eligible voters		14,148	
Source(s) Source: Elections Nova Scotia
