= List of ships named SS Ohio =

SS Ohio was a tanker launched in 1940 by Sun Shipbuilding for the Texas Oil Company; figured prominently in Operation Pedestal, the Allied resupply of Malta in World War II.

SS Ohio may also refer to the following ships:

- SS Ohio (1869), a Norddeutscher Lloyd passenger liner launched in 1869 by Caird & Company
- SS Ohio (1872), a passenger steamer launched in 1872 by William Cramp & Sons
- SS Ohio (1875), a lake freighter launched in 1875 by John F. Squires
- SS Ohio (1920), a Royal Mail Line steamer, later White Star Line's Albertic
- SS Ohio (1943), a United States military supply ship, built as a naval tanker

== See also ==
- SS Ohioan
- USS Ohio
