= Drumlin Heights Consolidated School =

Coordinates: 43.796416°N 65.853607°W

Location
- 5428 Highway 3 Glenwood, Nova Scotia; Canada

Information
- Type: Consolidated School
- Established: 2001
- Principal: Jordan Peirce
- Grades: K-12
- Enrollment: 400
- Website: drumlinheights.ednet.ns.ca

Drumlin Heights Consolidated School (DHCS) is a school located in Glenwood, Nova Scotia, Canada. Drumlin Heights is part of the Tri-County Regional School Board and is the only English high school in the municipality of Argyle. There was a contest held among students of the surrounding area to decide the name of the new school while it was being built. The winning name was submitted by Argyle student Jesse Malone, citing the regions landscape as the inspiration for the new title.
