= SMBA =

SMBA are initials that can refer to either:

- St Mary's Bay Academy
- Super Monkey Ball Adventure - A video game developed by Sega
- San Marcos Baptist Academy - A coed prep school Baptist institution
- Severe mosquito bite allergy
- UMP kinase, an enzyme
