= DRHS =

DRHS may refer to:

- Damonte Ranch High School
- Desert Ridge High School
- Deep Run High School
- Diamond Ranch High School
- Digby Regional High School
- Dalhousie Regional High School
- Del Rio High School
- Denmark Road High School
