= Peter Island (Nova Scotia) =

Island in Nova Scotia, Canada

Coordinates: 44°15′27″N 66°20′19″W

Peter Island is an uninhabited island in Digby County, Nova Scotia, Canada.

It is a bird sanctuary owned by the Nova Scotia Bird Society Sanctuary Trust, for gulls and terns.

A lighthouse was built in 1850, and replaced in 1909. The lighthouse was decommissioned in 2014, and declared a Heritage Site in 2021.

In 1986, the Islands Historical Society was formed as a registered charity to preserve and promote Long and Brier Islands.
