= Gilberts Cove, Nova Scotia =

Community in Nova Scotia, Canada

Coordinates: 44°28′57.16″N 65°56′55.31″W

Gilberts Cove in Nova Scotia

Gilberts Cove is a community in the Canadian province of Nova Scotia, located in the municipal district of Digby in Digby County.

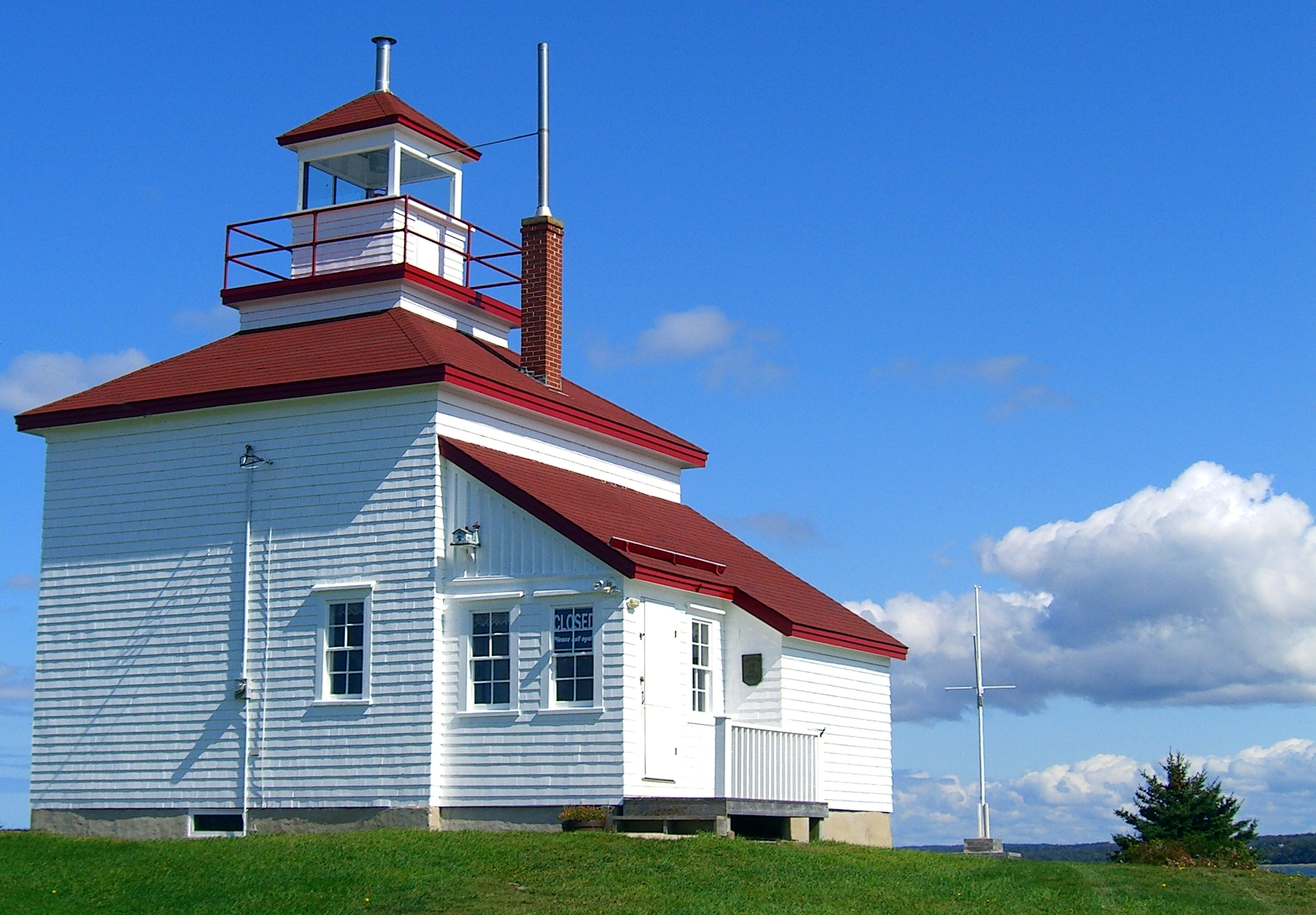
Gilberts Cove lighthouse

Gilberts Cove, 18–20 km west of Digby on the 101 Highway, is a charming spot and the home of "The Greatest Little Lighthouse in Canada". The lighthouse is open 10:00 am to 4 pm Monday to Saturday; Sunday noon to 4 pm from mid-June to mid-September. Nearby, The Barn at The Point caters to visitors with a four-star B&B and cafe serving homemade food. Gilberts Cove (or 'Gilbert Cove') is so named after Colonel Thomas Gilbert who first settled here and received a Land Grant from George III of 600 acres.
