= Ohio Territory =

The United States never had an organized territory named Ohio Territory. This term may refer to:

- Territory Northwest of the River Ohio, an organized incorporated territory of the United States in the Great Lakes region between 1787 and 1803
- Ohio Country, a vaguely defined colonial/frontier region, roughly covering the lands between the upper Ohio River and the Illinois Country (prior to 1787)
  - loosely, the Ohio River Valley in colonial times
- incorrectly or informally, lands within the boundary of the state of Ohio after statehood in 1803
- The portion of Canada, New France south of the Great Lakes, east of the Mississippi and Lake Michigan, which was conquered by Britain in the French and Indian Wars

== See also ==
- Ohio Valley (disambiguation)
- Ohio (disambiguation)
