= Ohio Valley (disambiguation) =

The Ohio Valley is the valley which surrounds the Ohio River.

Ohio Valley may also refer to:

- Ohio Valley Conference, NCAA Division I athletic conference
- Ohio Valley Hospital, former hospital in Kennedy Township, Pennsylvania
- Ohio Valley Mall, indoor shopping mall in St. Clairsville, Ohio
- Ohio Valley Redcoats, former minor league baseball team
- Ohio Valley–style pizza, style of pizza popular in Ohio and West Virginia
- Ohio Valley University, former private Christian college in Vienna, West Virginia
- Ohio Valley Wrestling, American professional wrestling promotion

== See also ==
- Ohio Territory (disambiguation)
- Ohio (disambiguation)
