= Gullivers Cove, Nova Scotia =

Community in Nova Scotia, Canada

Coordinates: 44°36′16.73″N 65°55′24.46″W

Gullivers Cove in Nova Scotia

Gullivers Cove is a community in the Canadian province of Nova Scotia, located in The Municipality of the District of Digby in Digby County.
