= North Range, Nova Scotia =

Community in Nova Scotia, Canada

Coordinates: 44°30′1.52″N 65°50′55.02″W

North Range in Nova Scotia

North Range is a community in the Canadian province of Nova Scotia, located in the Municipality of the District of Clare in Digby County.
