= Thomas Gilbert (military officer) =

- Born: November 25, 1714; Taunton, Massachusetts
- Died: July 1, 1797; Gagetown, New Brunswick
- Military career
- Allegiance: United Kingdom
- Branch: British Army
- Rank: Brigadier General
- Conflicts: King George's War: Siege of Louisbourg; French and Indian War, Battle of Lake George

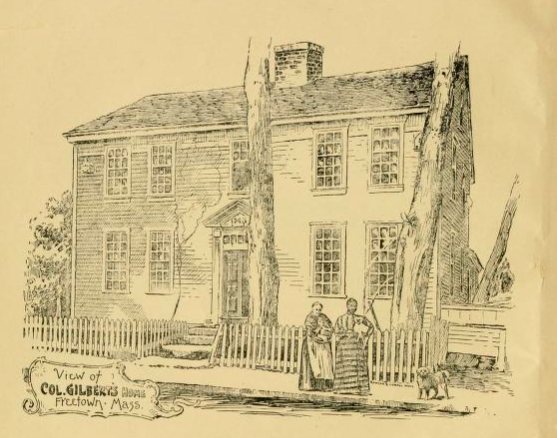
Col Thomas Gilbert House, Freetown, Massachusetts, former slave Patt (right)

Thomas Gilbert (1714-1797) was a soldier in King George's War, the French and Indian War and the American Revolution. He was known as the "Leader of the New England Tories". He became a Loyalist, originally from Assonet in Freetown, Massachusetts, he settled a community that was eventually named after him, Gilberts Cove, Nova Scotia.

During King George's War, he fought in the Siege of Louisbourg (1745). During the French and Indian War, he also fought at the Battle of Lake George as Lieutenant-Colonel under Brigadier-General Timothy Ruggles afterward of Wilmot, Nova Scotia (Upper Granville, Nova Scotia), at Crown Point in 1755. Gilbert became commander of the forces under Colonel Ephraim Williams when the latter was killed in the same year at Lake George.

During the American Revolution, Gilbert and his three sons fought for the British in Massachusetts. In May 1783 they were exiled to Nova Scotia along with their slaves during the Expulsion of the Loyalists. They settled in the community that became known as Gilberts Cove, Nova Scotia. They later moved to Saint John River (New Brunswick).
