= Plympton Station, Nova Scotia =

Community in Nova Scotia, Canada

Coordinates: 44°28′47.46″N 65°53′23.34″W

Plympton Station in Nova Scotia

Plympton Station is a community in the Canadian province of Nova Scotia, located in the Municipality of the District of Clare in Digby County.
