= Hilltown, Nova Scotia =

Community in Nova Scotia, Canada

Coordinates: 44.3148°N 65.9031°W

Hilltown in Nova Scotia

Hilltown is a community in the Canadian province of Nova Scotia, located in Digby County in the District of Clare. Hilltown is known to have many successful mink farms and various other smaller farms. It also has two side roads, Easton and the Hilltown Cross Road. It is located just off of Route 340.

Originally called "Hill Settlement", Hilltown was founded by John A. Hill in the year 1829. Hill resided in many different places in Digby County before he settled on a lot that is about 1 mile east of New Tusket Road.
