= Rossway, Nova Scotia =

Community in Nova Scotia, Canada

Coordinates: 44°34′44.31″N 65°54′54.8″W

Rossway in Nova Scotia

Rossway is a community in the Canadian province of Nova Scotia, located in the Municipality of the District of Digby in Digby County.
