= Lake Midway, Nova Scotia =

Community in Nova Scotia, Canada

Coordinates: 44°31′42.88″N 66°2′24.69″W

Lake Midway in Nova Scotia

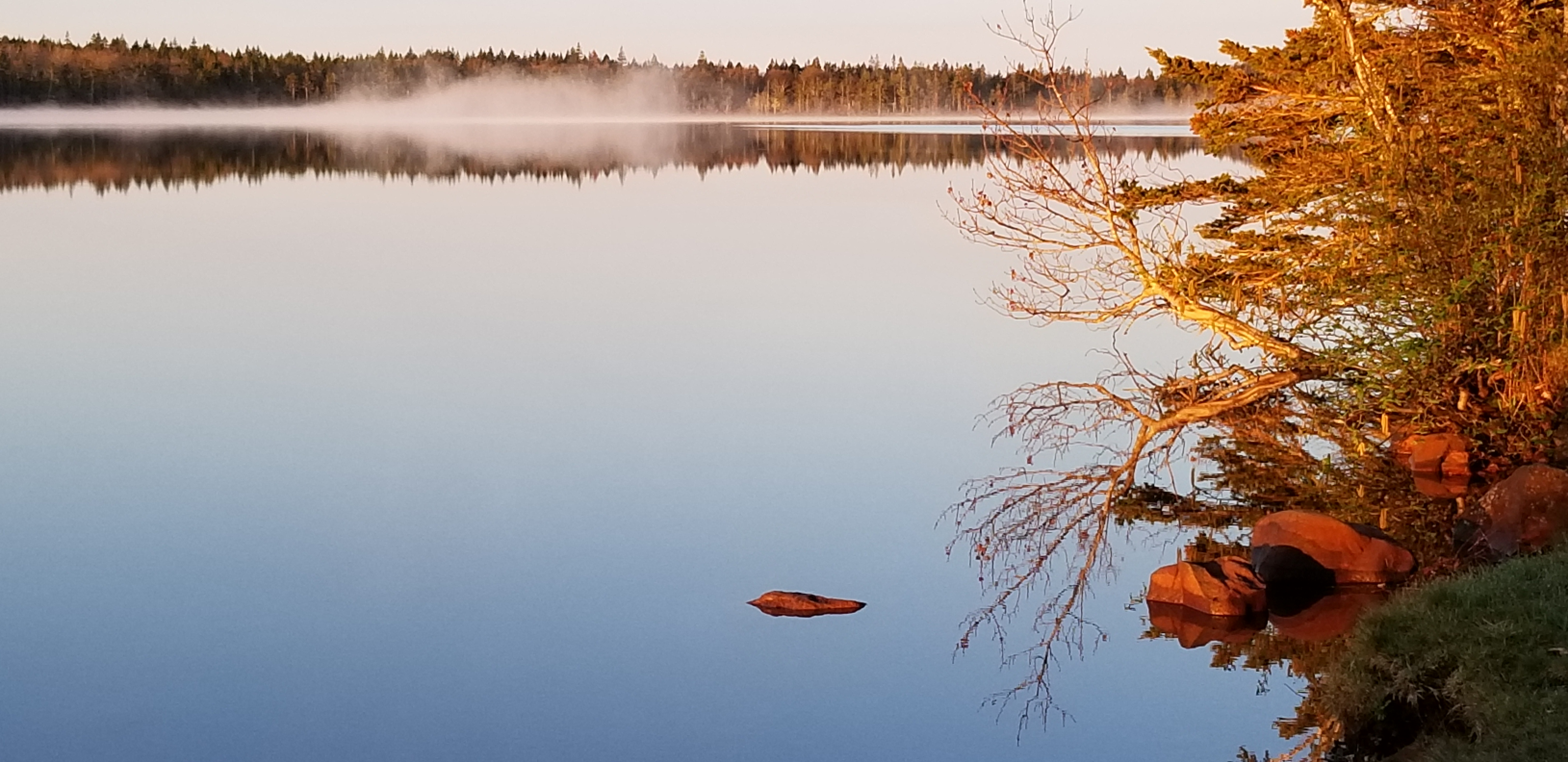
Photo of Lake Midway

Lake Midway is a community in the Canadian province of Nova Scotia, located in the Municipality of the District of Digby in Digby County.
