= St Mary's Bay Academy =

St. Mary's Bay Academy

Location
- 4079 Highway 1 Weymouth, Nova Scotia; Canada; 44°24′22″N 66°1′23″W

Information
- Type: Junior/Senior High School (7-12)
- Established: 2002
- Principal: Tonia Cromwell
- Grades: 7-12
- Enrollment: 340
- Mascot: Stingray
- Nickname: SMBA
- Website: SMBA

St. Mary's Bay Academy (SMBA) is a secondary school located in Weymouth, Nova Scotia. SMBA is part of the Tri-County Regional School Board. It is the only English high school in the municipality of Clare. It was formerly known as Clare District High.

== House System ==
The School currently uses a house system with names based on the schools initials, SMBA. The names of the houses are Stellar Sharks, Bold Barracudas, Mighty Marlins, and Atomic Anglers.
