= Bangor, Nova Scotia =

Community in Nova Scotia, Canada

Coordinates: 44°12′54.64″N 66°6′18.77″W

Bangor in Nova Scotia

Bangor is a community in the Canadian province of Nova Scotia, located in Digby County. The community was likely named after Bangor, Maine.

In 1956, Bangor had a population of 95 people.
