= Gordon Balser =

Canadian politician (1954–2024)

The Honourable Gordon Balser ECNS

MLA for Digby-Annapolis
- In office 24 March 1998 – 5 August 2003
- Preceded by: Joseph H. Casey
- Succeeded by: Harold Theriault

Personal details
- Born: 24 February 1954 Digby, Nova Scotia, Canada
- Died: 10 April 2024 (aged 70) Digby, Nova Scotia, Canada
- Party: Progressive Conservative
- Occupation: Teacher

Gordon Douglas Balser (24 February 1954 – 10 April 2024) was a Canadian educator and politician in Nova Scotia. He represented Digby-Annapolis in the Nova Scotia House of Assembly from 1998 to 2003 as a Progressive Conservative member.

== Early life ==
Balser was born on 24 February 1954. He grew up on a farm in Digby, Nova Scotia. He had four brothers and a sister. He attended Acadia University, where he received a BBA, BEd and a Masters in Education.

Balser was a teacher, teaching principal and acting superintendent of schools for the Digby district. During his education career, he was a teacher and principal at both Barton Consolidated School and Digby Elementary School, as well as superintendent of schools for the Tri-County Area. In the summer, he worked as a carpenter for over 30 years.

== Political career ==
Balser entered provincial politics in the 1998 election, defeating Liberal John Drish by 233 votes in the Digby-Annapolis riding. He was re-elected in the 1999 election by over 2,200 votes. In August 1999, he was appointed to the Executive Council of Nova Scotia as Minister of Economic Development and Minister of Transportation and Public Works. In December 1999, the Transportation and Public Works portfolio was transferred to Ron Russell. In June 2002, Balser was shuffled to Minister of Energy. On 19 December 2002, premier John Hamm shuffled his cabinet, moving Balser to Minister of Agriculture and Fisheries, and Minister of the Public Service Commission. In the 2003 election, Balser was defeated by Liberal Harold Theriault. Balser's loss was attributed to his support for a local quarrying project that Theriault had opposed.

== Personal life and death ==
In 1981, he married Wendy Suzanne Moore. His daughter Jill Balser was elected to the legislature to represent Digby-Annapolis in the 2021 Nova Scotia general election. In 2021, she became Nova Scotia's Minister of Labour, Skills and Immigration, as well as Minister responsible for Apprenticeship. He also had two other daughters, Erin and Anne. In 2002, he was awarded the Queen Elizabeth II Golden Jubilee Medal.

Balser died on 10 April 2024, at the age of 70.
