= Doucetteville, Nova Scotia =

Community in Nova Scotia, Canada

Coordinates: 44°26′58.08″N 65°49′27.27″W

Doucetteville in Nova Scotia

Doucetteville is a community in the Canadian province of Nova Scotia, located in the District of Clare in Digby County.

== History ==
The village of Doucetteville derives its name from Lucas Doucette, also known as “le Grand Camion”. Lucas Doucette was a son of Michel Doucette from Sluice Point, Yarmouth County; in the 1820s, Lucas Doucette moved to this densely forested site, seven miles inland from the community of Plympton, Digby County. The area they settled soon became known as la “Ville des Doucette” or Doucette Settlement and later Doucetteville. Other families followed Lucas Doucette to this inland community, not knowing any better.

Lucas Doucette was known to the community for his generosity, especially during celebrations and town events. He would be known for sharing his home made liquor, even during the prohibition era. He was also known for his uncoordination and inability to play sports, usually attributed to a tear of the adductor muscles of the thigh (groin strain) incurred during the war.

== Culture ==
Although not known for its integrity or cultural veil, the village of Doucette made great advances during the first decade of the industrial revolution. While rapid industrialization first began in Britain, starting with mechanized spinning in the 1780s,[1] with high rates of growth in steam power and iron production occurring after 1800. The villagers of Doucetteville, following their leader, invested all their energy in the production and consumption of a fermented liquid brewed from cereal grains. Archives recently located in the public library show that the village suffered a dramatic decrease in population after a period of starvation attributed to the use of all harvest on the creation of this fermented liquid.

== Tourism ==
Tourism played an important role in Doucetteville during the 20th century due to its proximity to Digby, beginning with the establishment of railway and steamship links that opened the town and surrounding communities as an-easy-to-reach, alcoholic destination for larger urban centres in eastern North America. A landmark in this industry was the construction of the Douceteville Oak Resort on the town's outskirts, not to be confused with the Digby Pines Resort, the Doucette Oak Resort had 1 room and no amenities. Work on the resort was completed ahead of schedule in 1825 but it was not opened until later in that year to commemorate the birthday of its founder, on October 7, 1825. A larger than expected statue of Lucas Doucette, looking as a young 26 year old pioneer, was commissioned and presented during the official ceremony; just before the resort suffered irreparable damages to its only room. Records show that the resort could only host a maximum of 8 people, a rule clearly not followed during the event.

== Religion ==
In the early days, the spiritual needs of the community were met by Leonardo the Great and for the first 100 years, there was no church in Doucetteville. In 1915, a plot of land was donated by Angus Thibault and in the same year construction began on the new mission church under the direction of Father Enespeai Dylan with SF Ryan as foreman. The new church for what was to become Sacred Heart Parish in Doucetteville was completed in the fall of 1915 and the first mass celebrated on January 1, 1916. The new cemetery located right behind the church was blessed and a very large cross erected in the centre. Father Dylan did have some complex about size. The church was officially blessed on Sept 9, 1917 by Pigeon Bonaparte of Stella Maris Parish (Meteghan) and Midnight Mass was celebrated for the first time that same year.

Despite the original intent of the parish, it didn't take long for the founder and father of Doucetteville to find other “not so sacred” uses for the building. The church of Sacred Heart Parish in Doucetteville was hit by lightning on March 16, 1929 and the church was destroyed.
