= Mink Cove, Nova Scotia =

Community in Nova Scotia, Canada

Coordinates: 44°27′53.66″N 66°6′33.12″W

Mink Cove in Nova Scotia

Mink Cove is a community in the Canadian province of Nova Scotia, located in the Municipality of the District of Digby in Digby County.
