= Brier Island =

Island in the Bay of Fundy

Coordinates: 44°15′32″N 66°21′44″W

Location in the Bay of Fundy
Brier Island in relation to Long Island and Digby Neck.

Brier Island is an island in the Bay of Fundy in Digby County, Nova Scotia.

== Geography ==
The island is the westernmost part of Nova Scotia and the southern end of the North Mountain ridge with Long Island lying immediately northeast; both islands constitute part of the Digby Neck. Brier Island measures approximately 7.5 km (4.7 mi) long and 2.5 km (1.6 mi) wide and is made up of basalt. The forest capability of Brier and Long Island is limited by shallow bedrock and severe exposure.

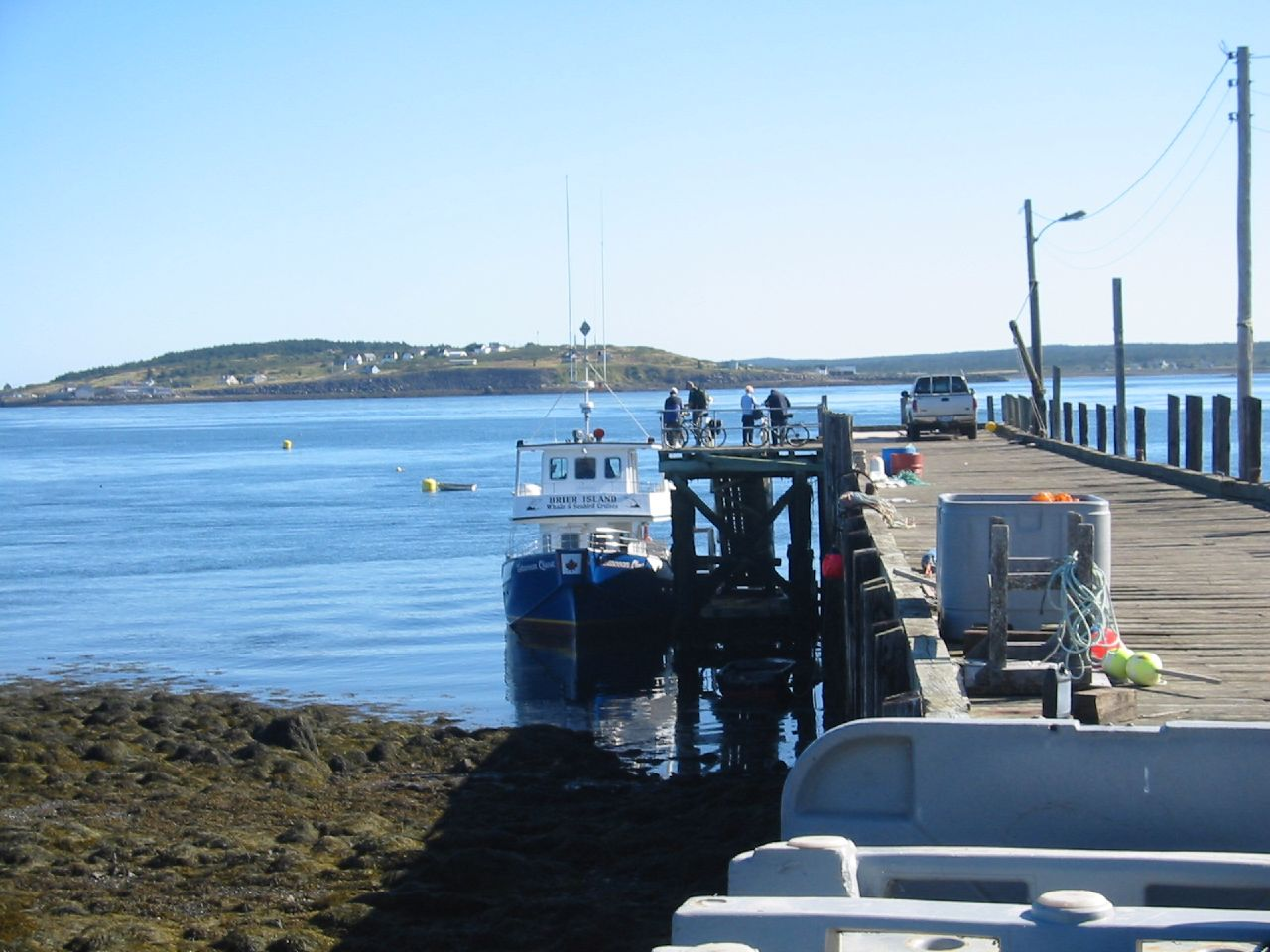
Looking down the pier on Brier Island, 2003

The island's shoreline measures approximately 25 km (16 mi) in length. Brier Island is separated from Long Island by the 0.5 km (0.31 mi) Grand Passage. Westport is the only village on the island. The population, as of 2016 was 218. There were 98 private dwellings occupied year round.

The island is an important stopover point for migrating sea birds.

The island's name is believed by some to come from the wild brier roses found there, another possibility is that the original name of the Island was "Bryer's" after a sea captain from New England who was one of the first settlers to spend any time on the island.

Another idea is that the name came from Andreas/Andrew Bayerlein whose name was changed to Brier and lived there around 1800. Andreas arrived in America in 1779 a Hessian Soldier from Ansbach, Bayern, Germany to fight in the Revolutionary War. He arrived 1783 in Nova Scotia and married Deborah Horton born Oct 22, 1775 daughter of Levi Horton and Mercy Haskell on December 16, 1794. Baptisms recorded at Church of England in Canada Trinity Anglican Church, Digby all on Nov 23, 1801 included an adult Deborah Brier, an adult Edmund Brier and 3 children of Andrew: Susanna Brier, Andrew Brier and William Brier. (Nova Scotia Church Records 1720-2001 Church of England in Canada Trinity Church, Digby, Cumberland - Baptisms, marriages, burials 1786-1839)

== Economy ==
The local economy is driven by the year-round commercial fishing industry and the seasonal tourism industry, which is largely focused on whale watching tours.

The island is home to R. E. Robicheau Ltd, a general store with a gas pump, gift shop, and café. On the eastern side of the island is the one hotel, the Brier Island Lodge. There are also several bed and breakfasts, a used book store and gift shops. The island contains the fishing village of Westport which is connected to Freeport on Long Island by a ferry operated by the provincial government.

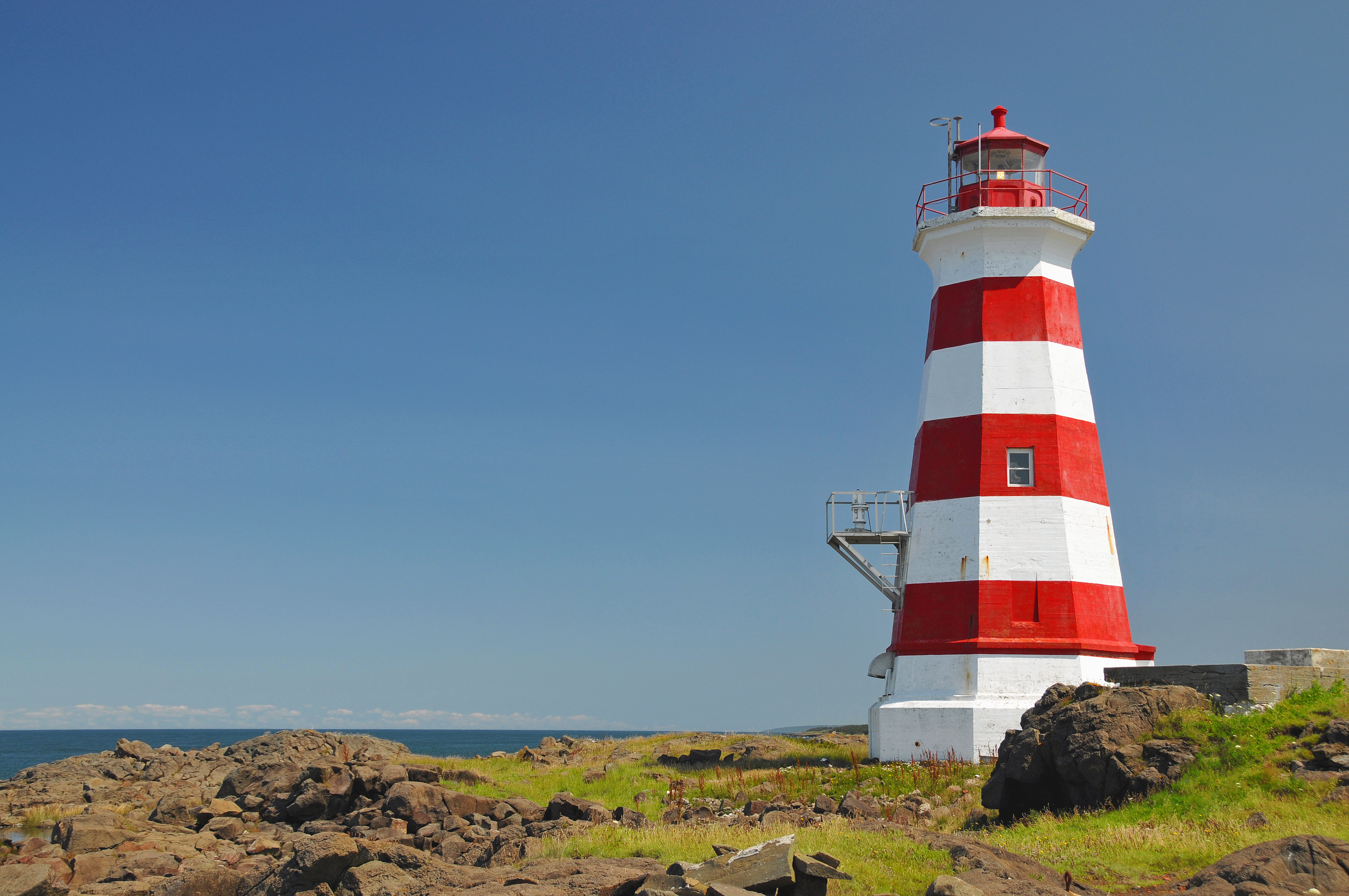
Brier Island Lighthouse

Brier Island is frequently inundated by fog and has witnessed 57 recorded shipwrecks. The island has "a lighthouse per mile" with the Northern and Western lighthouses on the island, as well as the Peter Island lighthouse in Grand Passage; all are automated and are operated by the Canadian Coast Guard. The wreck of the barque "Aurora" in 1908 provided the lumber for the Westport Community Hall.

The Canadian Coast Guard operates CCG Station Westport in the village. The rescue cutter CCGC Westport provides 24-hour-per-day, 7 days per week response to search and rescue incidents within the eastern Gulf of Maine and the southern and eastern Bay of Fundy.

Westport Branch Library; Westport

Brier Island was the childhood home of sailor Joshua Slocum who became the first person to circumnavigate the world alone. A monument to Slocum and the bootshop where he worked as a boy can be seen in Westport. In 1986, the Islands Historical Society was formed as a registered charity to preserve and promote Long and Brier Islands.

== Ecology ==
The endangered Eastern mountain avens is present on Brier Island.

== See also ==
- Volcanism of Eastern Canada
