= Lockeport Regional High School =

Coordinates: 43.697469°N 65.115048°W

Location
- 10 Locke Street; Lockeport, Nova Scotia; Canada

Information
- Type: High School
- Motto: Palma Non Sine Pulvere ("No reward without Effort")
- Principal: Jackie Treloar
- Grades: 7-12
- Enrollment: 137
- Colors: Green and White
- Mascot: The Greenwave
- Website: lockeport.ednet.ns.ca

Lockeport Regional High School (LRHS) is a secondary school located in Lockeport, Nova Scotia. LRHS is part of the Tri-County Regional School Board and is the only high school in the town of Lockeport.

== Administration ==
- Jackie Treloar - Principal
