= Nova Scotia Route 303 =

Highway in Nova Scotia, Canada

Route 303

Route information
- Maintained by Nova Scotia Department of Transportation and Infrastructure Renewal
- Length: 11 km (6.8 mi)

Major junctions
- South end: Hwy 101 in Conway
- Route 217 in Digby
- North end: Bayview Shore Road - Digby Ferry

Location
- Country: Canada
- Province: Nova Scotia
- Counties: Digby

Highway system
- Provincial highways in Nova Scotia; 100-series
← Route 302	→ Route 304

Route 303 is a collector road in the Canadian province of Nova Scotia.

It is located in Digby County and connects the Bay Ferries Limited terminal at Pollys Point where the ferry to Saint John, New Brunswick docks, with Conway at Exit 26 on Highway 101.

== Communities ==
- Conway
- Digby

== See also ==
- List of Nova Scotia provincial highways
