= Ohayo =

Ohayo (おはよう, ohayō) is a colloquial term meaning good morning in Japanese.

Ohayo may also refer to:

- Good Morning (1959 film), 1959 Japanese comedy film by director Yasujirō Ozu
- Ohayo Mountain, Catskill Mountains, New York, US
- A misspelling of Ohio, a U.S. state

== See also ==
- Ohayocon, anime convention
- Ohayō! Spank, manga and anime
- Ohio (disambiguation)
- Good Morning (disambiguation)
