= Jill Balser =

Canadian politician

The Honourable Jill Balser ECNS MLA

Member of the Nova Scotia House of Assembly for Digby-Annapolis
- Incumbent
- Assumed office August 17, 2021
- Preceded by: first member

Personal details
- Born: March 3, 1986 (age 40) Digby, Nova Scotia
- Party: Progressive Conservative

Jill Suzanne Balser (born March 3, 1986) is a Canadian politician who was elected to the Nova Scotia House of Assembly in the 2021 Nova Scotia general election. She represents the riding of Digby-Annapolis as a member of the Progressive Conservative Association of Nova Scotia.

She is the daughter of Gordon Balser, who represented the same district from 1998 to 2003.

On August 31, 2021, Balser was made Minister of Labor, Skills, and Immigration, as well as Minister responsible for Apprenticeship.

== Electoral record ==
2024 Nova Scotia general election: Digby-Annapolis
Party	Candidate	Votes	%	±%
Progressive Conservative	Jill Balser	3,300	73.22%	+23.67
Liberal	Joey Amero	854	18.95%	-16.12
New Democratic	Shannon Long	353	7.83%	-2.94
Total valid votes		4,507		
Total rejected ballots		40	0.88%	
Total declined ballots		4	0.09%	
Turnout		4,551	41.65%	
Eligible voters		10,928		
Progressive Conservative hold		Swing		
Source: Elections Nova Scotia

2021 Nova Scotia general election: Digby-Annapolis
Party	Candidate	Votes	%	±%	Expenditures
Progressive Conservative	Jill Balser	2,636	49.55	+26.02	$18,174.72
Liberal	Jimmy MacAlpine	1,865	35.06	-16.71	$31,375.32
New Democratic	Michael Carty	626	11.77	-11.61	$21,949.92
Green	Jessica Walker	113	2.12	+1.09	$200.00
Atlantica	Tyler Ducharme	80	1.50	+1.21	$200.00
Total valid votes/expense limit		5,320	99.66	–	$62,588.83
Total rejected ballots		18	0.34		
Turnout		5,338	52.98		
Eligible voters		10,075			
Progressive Conservative notional gain from Liberal		Swing		+21.37	
Source: Elections Nova Scotia
