= Ohio Township =

Ohio Township may refer to:

- List of townships in Ohio

== Illinois ==
- Ohio Township, Bureau County, Illinois

== Indiana ==
- Ohio Township, Bartholomew County, Indiana
- Ohio Township, Crawford County, Indiana
- Ohio Township, Spencer County, Indiana
- Ohio Township, Warrick County, Indiana

== Iowa ==
- Ohio Township, Madison County, Iowa

== Kansas ==
- Ohio Township, Franklin County, Kansas
- Ohio Township, Ness County, Kansas
- Ohio Township, Saline County, Kansas
- Ohio Township, Sedgwick County, Kansas
- Ohio Township, Stafford County, Kansas

== Missouri ==
- Ohio Township, Mississippi County, Missouri

== Ohio ==
- Ohio Township, Clermont County, Ohio
- Ohio Township, Gallia County, Ohio
- Ohio Township, Monroe County, Ohio

== Pennsylvania ==
- Ohio Township, Pennsylvania

== South Dakota ==
- Ohio Township, Hand County, South Dakota, in Hand County, South Dakota
