= Danvers, Nova Scotia =

Community in Nova Scotia, Canada

Coordinates: 44°22′44.71″N 65°54′0.42″W

Havelock in Nova Scotia

Danvers is a community in the Canadian province of Nova Scotia, located in the District of Clare in Digby County.
