= Hassett, Nova Scotia =

Community in Nova Scotia, Canada

Coordinates: 44°20′21.11″N 65°56′20.08″W

Hassett in Nova Scotia

Hassett is a community in the Canadian province of Nova Scotia, located in Digby County. The namesake of the community is William Hassett, who lead a group of Irish lumbermen settling in the area around 1828. Hassett had a population of 138 people in 1956.
