= USS Ohio =

USS Ohio may refer to the following ships of the United States Navy:

- USS Ohio (1812) was a schooner on Lake Erie during the War of 1812 in commission from 1813 to 1814, captured by British and renamed as HMS Huron
- USS Ohio (1820) was a ship of the line, launched in 1820 and in commission as a warship from 1838 to 1840 and from 1846 to 1850, then later used as a receiving ship
- USS Ohio (BB-12) was a Maine-class pre-dreadnought battleship in commission from 1904 to 1922
- USS Ohio (BB-68) was a planned Montana-class battleship cancelled in 1943 before her keel was laid down
- USS Ohio (SSGN-726), is an Ohio-class nuclear-powered submarine commissioned in 1981 and currently in service. She was originally launched as a ballistic missile submarine (SSBN), but from 2003–2006 was converted to a guided missile submarine (SSGN) carrying cruise missiles.

== See also ==
- SS Ohio
- SS Ohioan
- USS Bohio, an armed brig in commission from 1861 to 1865 that saw service in the American Civil War
