= Digby Regional High School =

Location
- 107 King Street; Digby, Nova Scotia; Canada
- Coordinates: 44.6203°N 65.7596°W

Information
- Motto: Quod Incepimus Conficiemus (What We Have Begun We Shall Finish)
- Established: 1948
- Principal: Jennifer Thibault
- Grades: 7-12
- Enrollment: 540
- Colors: Green & gold
- Mascot: Mariner
- Website: digbyregionalhigh.ednet.ns.ca/index.html

Digby Regional High School (DRHS) is a secondary school located in Digby, Nova Scotia. DRHS is part of the Tri-County Regional School Board and is the only high school in the town of Digby. The new high school was opened in 2001.

== Administration ==
- Adam Aldred - Principal
