= Ohio, Digby, Nova Scotia =

Community in Nova Scotia, Canada

Coordinates: 44°23′33.29″N 66°0′54.46″W

Ohio in Nova Scotia

Ohio is a small community in the Canadian province of Nova Scotia, located in the District of Clare in Digby County. It is south of Weymouth, Nova Scotia and is home to very few people.

== See also ==
- Ohio, Antigonish County, in Antigonish County
- Ohio, Yarmouth, Nova Scotia, in Yarmouth County
