= Ohio Theatre =

Ohio Theatre or Ohio Theater may refer to:

On the National Register of Historic Places:

- Ohio Theatre (Cleveland, Ohio), part of the Playhouse Square Center, Cleveland, Ohio
- Ohio Theatre (Columbus, Ohio)
- Ohio Theatre (Lima, Ohio)
- Ohio Theatre (Loudonville, Ohio)
- Ohio Theatre (Toledo, Ohio)
- Renaissance Theatre (Mansfield, Ohio), originally called the Ohio Theatre
- New Ohio Theatre, New York City, called the Ohio Theatre at a previous location
