= Digby-Annapolis =

Provincial electoral district in Nova Scotia, Canada

Nova Scotia electoral district

Provincial electoral district
- Legislature: Nova Scotia House of Assembly
MLA
Jill Balser
Progressive Conservative
- District created: 1993, 2019
- District abolished: 2013
- Last contested: 2024

Demographics
- Population (2011): 12,829
- Electors: 9,883
- Area (km²): 2,624
- Pop. density (per km²): 4.9
- Census division(s): Annapolis County, Digby County
- Census subdivision(s): Annapolis, Sudb. A, Annapolis, Subd. D, Bear River 6, Bear River 6B, Municipality of the District of Digby, Digby (town)

Digby—Annapolis is a provincial electoral district in Nova Scotia, Canada, which existed between 1993 and 2013 and since 2021. It elects one member of the Nova Scotia House of Assembly. The electoral district includes the Municipality of the District of Digby, which is the northeastern half of Digby County as well as the western part of Annapolis County.

The electoral district was created in 1993 by merging sections from Annapolis East, Annapolis West, and Digby. It was abolished following the 2012 electoral boundary review and was largely replaced by the new electoral districts of Clare-Digby and Annapolis. It was re-created out of those districts following the 2019 electoral boundary review.

== Geography ==
Digby-Annapolis covers 2,624 km^{2} (1,013 sq mi) of land.

== Members of the Legislative Assembly ==
The electoral district was represented by the following members of the Legislative Assembly:

Digby-Annapolis
Legislature	Years	Member	Party
Riding created from Annapolis East, Annapolis West and Digby
56th	1993–1998	Joseph H. Casey	Liberal
57th	1998–1999	Gordon Balser	Progressive Conservative
58th	1999–2003	Gordon Balser	Progressive Conservative
59th	2003–2006	Harold Theriault	Liberal
60th	2006–2009	Harold Theriault	Liberal
61st	2009–2013	Harold Theriault	Liberal
Riding dissolved into Annapolis and Clare-Digby
Riding recreated from Annapolis and Clare-Digby
64th	2021–2024	Jill Balser	Progressive Conservative
65th	2024–present	Jill Balser	Progressive Conservative

== Election results ==
=== 2024 ===
2024 Nova Scotia general election
Party	Candidate	Votes	%	±%
Progressive Conservative	Jill Balser	3,300	73.22%	+23.67
Liberal	Joey Amero	854	18.95%	-16.12
New Democratic	Shannon Long	353	7.83%	-2.94
Total valid votes		4,507		
Total rejected ballots		40	0.88%	
Total declined ballots		4	0.09%	
Turnout		4,551	41.65%	
Eligible voters		10,928		
Progressive Conservative hold		Swing		
Source: Elections Nova Scotia

=== 2021 ===
2021 Nova Scotia general election
Party	Candidate	Votes	%	±%	Expenditures
Progressive Conservative	Jill Balser	2,636	49.55	+26.02	$18,174.72
Liberal	Jimmy MacAlpine	1,865	35.06	-16.71	$31,375.32
New Democratic	Michael Carty	626	11.77	-11.61	$21,949.92
Green	Jessica Walker	113	2.12	+1.09	$200.00
Atlantica	Tyler Ducharme	80	1.50	+1.21	$200.00
Total valid votes/expense limit		5,320	99.66	–	$62,588.83
Total rejected ballots		18	0.34		
Turnout		5,338	52.98		
Eligible voters		10,075			
Progressive Conservative notional gain from Liberal		Swing		+21.37	
Source: Elections Nova Scotia

=== 2017 (transposed) ===
2017 provincial election redistributed results
Party	Vote	%
Liberal	2,854	51.77
Progressive Conservative	1,297	23.53
New Democratic	1,289	23.38
Green	57	1.03
Atlantica	16	0.29

=== 2009 ===
2009 Nova Scotia general election
Party	Candidate	Votes	%	±%
Liberal	Harold Theriault	3,514	63.48%	12.56%
New Democratic	Sherri Oliver	1,092	19.73%	8.60%
Progressive Conservative	Cindy Nesbitt	852	15.39%	-21.03%
Green	Namron Bean	78	1.41%	-0.13%
Total valid votes		5,536	100.00	
Total rejected ballots		22	0.40	
Turnout		5,558	56.24	
Eligible voters		9,983		
Source(s) Source: Nova Scotia Legislature (2021). "Electoral History for Digby-Annapolis" (PDF). nslegislature.ca.

=== 2006 ===
2006 Nova Scotia general election
Party	Candidate	Votes	%	±%
Liberal	Harold Theriault	3,034	50.91%	5.35%
Progressive Conservative	Jimmy MacAlpine	2,170	36.42%	-3.56%
New Democratic	Andrew Oliver	663	11.13%	-1.78%
Green	Namron Bean	92	1.54%	–
Total valid votes		5,959	100.00	
Total rejected ballots		12	0.20	
Turnout		5,971	59.27	
Eligible voters		10,075		
Source(s) Source: Nova Scotia Legislature (2021). "Electoral History for Digby-Annapolis" (PDF). nslegislature.ca. 2006 Nova Scotia Provincial General Election: Poll by Poll Results – Digby-Annapolis (PDF) (Report). Elections Nova Scotia. Archived from the original (PDF) on 29 September 2007.

=== 2003 ===
2003 Nova Scotia general election
Party	Candidate	Votes	%	±%
Liberal	Harold Theriault	2,666	45.56%	21.48%
Progressive Conservative	Gordon Balser	2,339	39.98%	-18.77%
New Democratic	Deborah Trask	755	12.90%	-4.27%
Nova Scotia Party	Gordon D. Reid	91	1.56%	–
Total valid votes		5,851	100.00	
Total rejected ballots		34	0.58	
Turnout		5,885	64.92	
Eligible voters		9,065		
Source(s) Source: Nova Scotia Legislature (2021). "Electoral History for Digby-Annapolis" (PDF). nslegislature.ca.

=== 1999 ===
1999 Nova Scotia general election
Party	Candidate	Votes	%	±%
Progressive Conservative	Gordon Balser	3,780	58.74%	21.52%
Liberal	Vivian O'Neil	1,550	24.09%	-9.62%
New Democratic	Steve Downes	1,105	17.17%	-11.90%
Total valid votes		6,435	100.00	
Total rejected ballots		43	0.66	
Turnout		6,478	63.57	
Eligible voters		10,191		
Source(s) Source: Nova Scotia Legislature (2021). "Electoral History for Digby-Annapolis" (PDF). nslegislature.ca. Nova Scotia, Chief Electoral Officer (1999). Returns of the General Election for the House of Assembly, Thirty-Fifth General Election (Report). Elections Nova Scotia.

=== 1998 ===
1998 Nova Scotia general election
Party	Candidate	Votes	%	±%
Progressive Conservative	Gordon Balser	2,465	37.22%	18.50%
Liberal	John Drish	2,232	33.71%	-37.76%
New Democratic	Steve Downes	1,925	29.07%	19.26%
Total valid votes		6,622	100.00	
Total rejected ballots		51	0.76	
Turnout		6,673	64.90	
Eligible voters		10,281		
Source(s) Source: Nova Scotia Legislature (2021). "Electoral History for Digby-Annapolis" (PDF). nslegislature.ca.

=== 1993 ===
1993 Nova Scotia general election
Party	Candidate	Votes	%	±%
Liberal	Joseph H. Casey	5,805	71.46%	–
Progressive Conservative	Walter MacAlpine	1,521	18.72%	–
New Democratic	Susan Jamieson	797	9.81%	–
Total valid votes		8,123	100.00	
Total rejected ballots		69	0.84	
Turnout		8,192	73.79	
Eligible voters		11,178		
Source(s) Source: Nova Scotia Legislature (2021). "Electoral History for Digby-Annapolis" (PDF). nslegislature.ca. Nova Scotia. Chief Electoral Officer (1993). Returns of the General Election for the House of Assembly, Thirty-Third General Election (PDF). Queen's Printer.

== See also ==
- List of Nova Scotia provincial electoral districts
- Canadian provincial electoral districts
