= South Range, Nova Scotia =

Community in Nova Scotia, Canada

Coordinates: 44°28′58.93″N 65°48′3.22″W

South Range in Nova Scotia

South Range is a community in the Canadian province of Nova Scotia, located in the Municipality of the District of Clare in Digby County.
