= Riverdale, Nova Scotia =

Community in Nova Scotia, Canada

Coordinates: 44°20′51.6″N 65°52′10.42″W

Riverdale in Nova Scotia

Riverdale is a community in the Canadian province of Nova Scotia, located in the Municipality of the District of Clare in Digby County.
