= Richfield, Nova Scotia =

Community in Nova Scotia, Canada

Coordinates: 44°7′9.8″N 65°55′24.46″W

Richfield in Nova Scotia

Richfield is a community in the Canadian province of Nova Scotia, located in Digby County. The name of the area is thought to be descriptive, referring to its rich soil for growing crops.
