= Corberrie =

Community in Nova Scotia, Canada

Coordinates: 44°14′8.18″N 65°55′49.18″W

Corberrie in Nova Scotia

Corberrie is a community in the Canadian province of Nova Scotia, located in Digby County. The name of the community may be derived from the old English word corbie, meaning crow, or the French word corbeille, meaning basket or a clump of trees.

Corberrie was established in 1829 by Mathurin McCollough. In 1956, the community had a population of 127 people.
