= Weaver Settlement =

Community in Nova Scotia, Canada

Coordinates: 44°23′5.02″N 65°57′54.01″W

Weaver Settlement in Nova Scotia

Weaver Settlement is a community in the Canadian province of Nova Scotia, located in Digby County. The area is named for its early settlers, and was formerly known as Ohio. Weaver Settlement had a population of 264 people in 1956.
