= SS Ohioan =

SS Ohioan may refer to one of two ships owned by the American-Hawaiian Steamship Company

- SS Ohioan (1914), built for American-Hawaiian in 1914, served as USS Ohioan in World War I, ran aground near San Francisco in 1936
- SS Ohioan (1920), the former Pawlet, purchased by American-Hawaiian in 1937, sunk by German submarine U-564 in World War II
