= Tiverton, Nova Scotia =

Tiverton
- Village
- Boar's Head Lighthouse, Tiverton, Nova Scotia

- Location of Tiverton in Nova Scotia
- Coordinates: 44°23′2″N 66°13′03″W
- Country: Canada
- Province: Nova Scotia
- County: Digby
- Municipality: The Municipality of the District of Digby
- Highest elevation: 15 m (49 ft)
- Lowest elevation: 0 m (0 ft)

Population
  - Total: 300
- Time zone: UTC-4 (AST)
  - Summer (DST): UTC-3 (ADT)
- Canadian Postal code: B0V 1G0
- Area code: 902
- Telephone Exchange: 839
- NTS Map: 021B08
- GNBC Code: CBMAF

Tiverton is a small village located on the northeast tip of Long Island, Nova Scotia. Tiverton has a population of about 300 people. It was named for Tiverton, Devon.

The main industry is lobster fishing, while a second, and growing industry, is tourism. The Bay of Fundy is known for whale watching, and Tiverton and the surrounding area offer several tours operating throughout the summer months.

Another attraction is Balancing Rock, a large basalt column that appears to be balancing on its end on the southern shore on a 2.5km trail outside Tiverton, which draws 10,000 visitors annually.

Local author Donald Outhouse has written about the region's history.
