= Westport, Nova Scotia =

Village in Nova Scotia, Canada

Coordinates: 44°15′39″N 66°21′06″W

Location of Westport in Nova Scotia

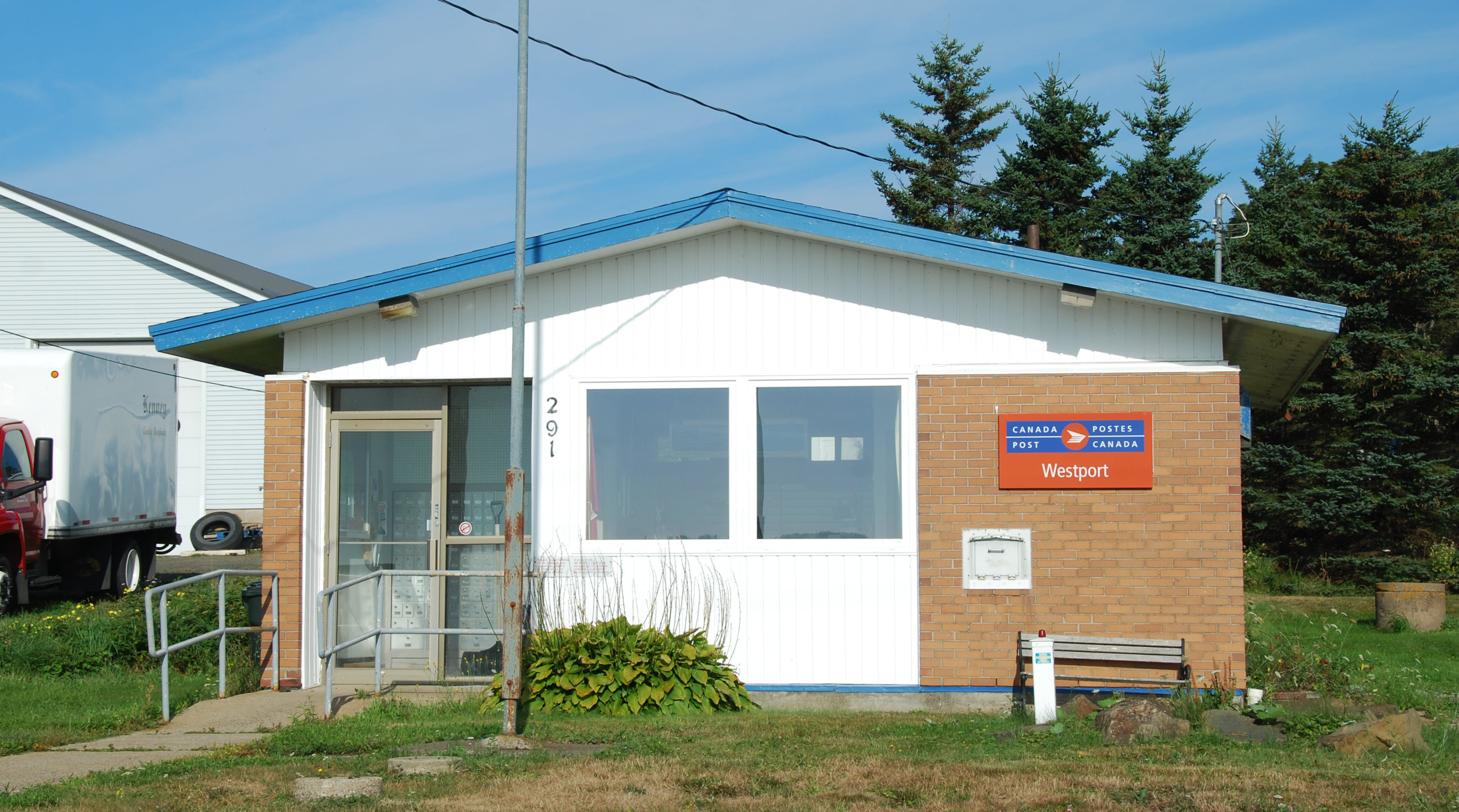
The post office in Westport

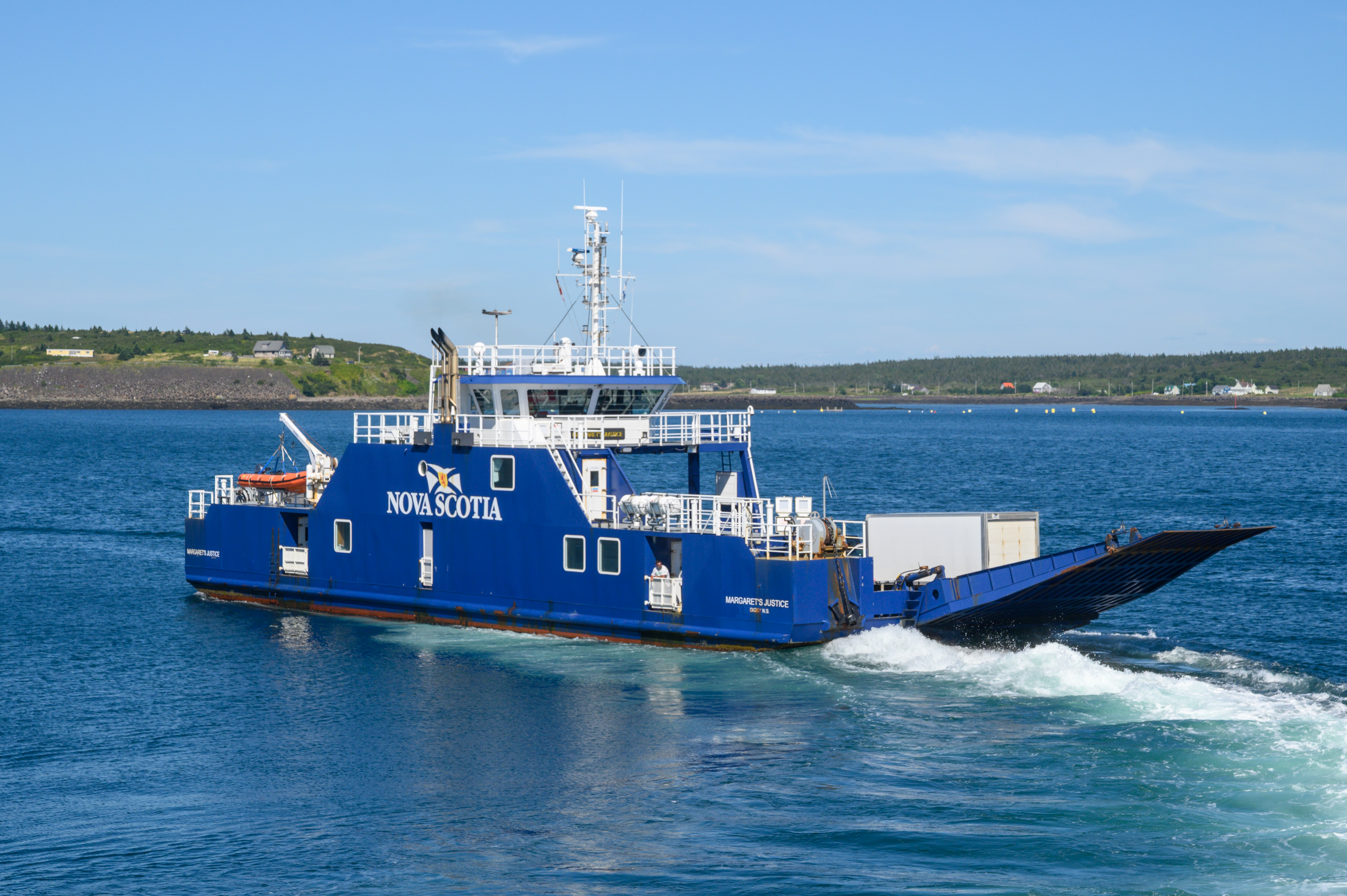
RORO ferry, MV Margaret’s Justice, on the Grand Passage route, leaving Westport, Nova Scotia, Canada for Freeport.

Westport is a village in Digby County, Nova Scotia and it is located on Brier Island in the Bay of Fundy. As of 2021, the population was 193.

== History ==
The settlement began with the arrival of David Welch and his family in 1769, as well as the Morrells. This was followed by the arrival of several more United Empire Loyalist families in 1783.

The village was incorporated in 1946.

A ferry service connects the village with Freeport, Nova Scotia on Long Island. A second ferry runs from Digby Neck to Long Island.

Joshua Slocum, the first person to sail solo around the world, grew up in Westport, where his mother was born. A monument in his memory was built on the southern end of the village.

Mathematician Roland Richardson was the principal of Westport's high school from 1899 to 1902.

== Demographics ==
In the 2021 Census of Population conducted by Statistics Canada, Westport had a population of 193 living in 94 of its 119 total private dwellings, a change of -11.5% from its 2016 population of 218. With a land area of 11.68 km^{2} (4.51 sq mi), it had a population density of 16.5/km^{2} (42.8/sq mi) in 2021.
