= Glenwood, Nova Scotia =

Community in Nova Scotia, Canada

Coordinates: 43°47′34.02″N 65°52′52.44″W

Glenwood in Nova Scotia

Glenwood is a community in the Canadian province of Nova Scotia, located in Yarmouth County. The area was previously known as "Argyle Head", being renamed "Glenwood" in March 1873. The name of "Argyle Head" was later given to a different community not far from here.

Glenwood is home to the Sand Pond National Wildlife Area.
