= Whylah Falls =

1990 book by George Elliott Clarke

Whylah Falls is a long narrative poem (or "verse novel") by George Elliott Clarke, published in book form in 1990.

As with much of Clarke's work, the poem is inspired by the history and culture of the Black Canadian community in Nova Scotia, which he refers to as the "Africadian" community (a combination of the words "African" and "Acadian"). Clarke himself describes the work as a "blues spiritual about love and the pain of love".

Whylah Falls tells the story of several pairs of black lovers in southwestern Nova Scotia in the 1930s, through dramatic monologues, songs, sermons, sonnets, newspaper snippets, recipes, haiku and free verse. It has also been released in audiobook form, with an original jazz score performed by Joe Sealy, Jamie Gattie and Steve Macdonald to accompany the reading. Clarke also adapted the poem into a stage play, which premiered in 1999.

Whylah Falls was a winner of the Archibald Lampman Award for poetry. The book was also chosen for the CBC's inaugural Canada Reads competition in 2002, where it was championed by author Nalo Hopkinson.
