= New Edinburgh, Nova Scotia =

Community in Nova Scotia, Canada

Coordinates: 44°26′6.46″N 66°0′49.06″W

New Edinburgh in Nova Scotia

New Edinburgh is a community in the Canadian province of Nova Scotia, located in Digby County. The area was settled by Scottish Loyalists in 1783, who named it after Edinburgh in Scotland.

New Edinburgh had a population of 183 people in 1956.

== See also ==
- Peggy Stewart
