= East Ferry, Nova Scotia =

Community in Nova Scotia, Canada

Coordinates: 44°23′44.77″N 66°12′12.39″W

East Ferry in Nova Scotia

East Ferry is a community in the Canadian province of Nova Scotia, located in Digby County on Digby Neck.
