= Ohio, Antigonish County =

Community in Nova Scotia, Canada

Coordinates: 45°31′12.43″N 62°4′12.34″W

Ohio in Nova Scotia

Ohio is a small community in the Canadian province of Nova Scotia, located in Antigonish County.
