= Digby Neck =

Peninsula of Nova Scotia in the Bay of Fundy

Coordinates: 44°31′41.90″N 66°2′46.53″W

Location in the Bay of Fundy
Digby Neck, and the nearby islands of Long Island and Brier Island

Digby Neck is a Canadian peninsula extending into the Bay of Fundy in Digby County, Nova Scotia.

Digby Neck is the western extension of the North Mountain range from the Annapolis Valley and is made of two thick lava flows. It is separated from the eastern portion of the North Mountain by a deep, tidal channel, the Digby Gut. Along with Long Island and Brier Island, it forms the northwest shore of St. Mary's Bay.

The westernmost community on the Digby Neck is East Ferry, opposite Tiverton on Long Island to the west. The "Petit Passage" separates Long Island from the Digby Neck.

In 2018 Bilcon sought to blast a gravel quarry on the Digby Neck, but an environmental impact study killed the plan.

== Hurricane ==
In September 2008 Hurricane Kyle made landfall on the peninsula as a category 1 hurricane.

== See also ==
- Digby County, Nova Scotia
- Volcanism of Canada
- Volcanism of Eastern Canada
