= Freeport, Nova Scotia =

Freeport
- Village
- Location of Freeport, Nova Scotia
- Coordinates: 44°16′27″N 66°19′18″W
- Country: Canada
- Province: Nova Scotia
- County: Digby
- Municipality: Digby
- Founded: 1784

Area
  - Total: 7.57 km^{2} (2.92 sq mi)
- Highest elevation: 5 m (16 ft)
- Lowest elevation: 0 m (0 ft)

Population (2021)
  - Total: 217
  - Density: 28.7/km^{2} (74/sq mi)
- Time zone: UTC-4 (AST)
  - Summer (DST): UTC-3 (ADT)
- Canadian Postal code: B0V 1B0
- Area code: 902
- Telephone Exchange: 839
- NTS Map: 021B08
- GNBC Code: CAMZW
- Website: www.freeportnovascotia.ca

Freeport is a working fishing village in the Canadian province of Nova Scotia, located at the end of Digby Neck in Digby County on Long Island in the Bay of Fundy.

== History ==
Loyalists founded Freeport in 1784 establishing fishing and trading industries. Prior to this it had been inhabited by the Mi'kmaq First Nation.

Place names such as Petit Passage, Grand Passage and the Saint Mary's Bay can be attributed to the French explorer, Samuel de Champlain, who first visited the area in 1604. However, the village itself was most likely named for Freeport, Maine, or because the water of and surrounding the harbour does not freeze during winter due to extreme tidal fluctuations, making it free from ice. Well known Black Loyalist, Rose Fortune is believed to have lived here in 1795, giving birth to one of her children.

== Demographics ==
In the 2021 Census of Population conducted by Statistics Canada, Freeport had a population of 217 living in 113 of its 138 total private dwellings, a change of −2.7% from its 2016 population of 223. With a land area of 7.57 km^{2} (2.92 sq mi), it had a population density of 28.7/km^{2} (74.2/sq mi) in 2021.

== In popular culture ==
The community is the final destination of Brad Pitt in the movie World War Z (2013), although this scene was not filmed in Freeport, but Lulworth Cove in the UK.
