= Municipality of the District of Digby =

Digby
- District municipality
- Municipality of the District of Digby
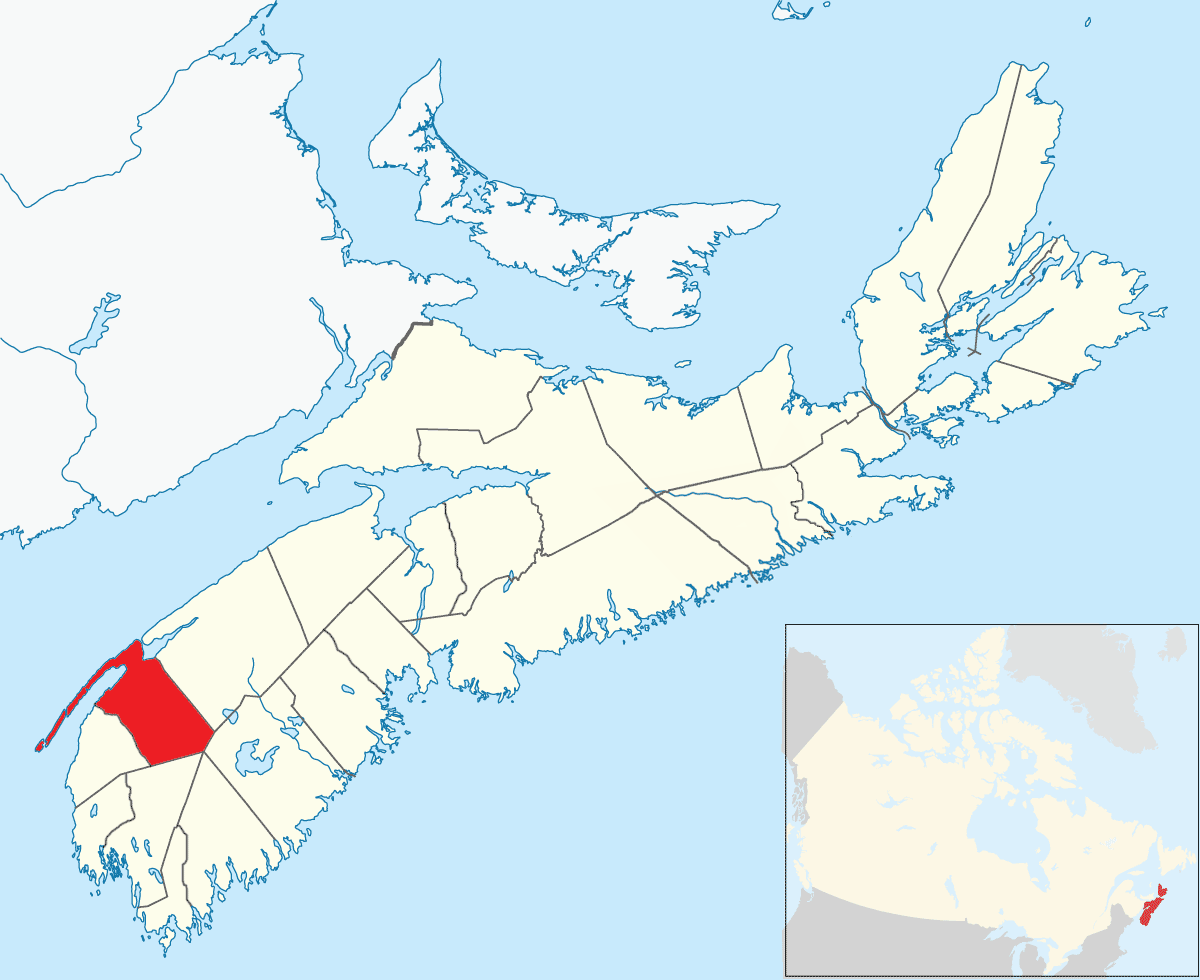
- Location of the Municipality of the District of Digby
- Coordinates: 44°22′N 65°42′W
- Country: Canada
- Province: Nova Scotia
- County: Digby
- Incorporated: April 17, 1879
- Electoral Districts Federal: West Nova
- Provincial: Digby-Annapolis

Government
  - Type: Digby Municipal Council
  - Warden: Linda Gregory

Area
  - Land: 1,657.33 km^{2} (639.90 sq mi)

Population (2016)
  - Total: 7,107
  - Density: 4.3/km^{2} (11/sq mi)
  - Change 2011-16: ▼4.8%
  - Census Ranking: 509 of 5,008
- Time zone: UTC-4 (AST)
  - Summer (DST): UTC-3 (ADT)
- Dwellings: 4,048
- Median Income*: $38,062 CDN
- Website: Official website
- Median household income, 2005 (all households)

Digby, officially named the Municipality of the District of Digby, is a district municipality in Digby County, Nova Scotia, Canada. Statistics Canada classifies the district municipality as a municipal district.

The district municipality forms the eastern part of Digby County. It is one of three municipal units in the county, the other two being the Town of Digby and the Municipality of the District of Clare.

== Demographics ==
Historical population
Year	Pop.	±%
1981	9,496	—
1986	9,543	+0.5%
1991	9,230	−3.3%
1996	8,926	−3.3%
2001	8,281	−7.2%
2006	7,986	−3.6%
2011	7,463	−6.5%
2016	7,107	−4.8%
2021	7,242	+1.9%
Source: Statistics Canada:

In the 2021 Census of Population conducted by Statistics Canada, the Municipality of the District of Digby had a population of 7,242 living in 3,427 of its 4,099 total private dwellings, a change of 1.9% from its 2016 population of 7,107. With a land area of 1,654.59 km^{2} (638.84 sq mi), it had a population density of 4.4/km^{2} (11.3/sq mi) in 2021.

Mother tongue language (2006)
Language	Population	Pct (%)
English only	7,555	94.73%
French only	285	3.58%
Other languages	110	1.38%
Both English and French	25	0.31%

Ethnic Groups (2006)
Ethnic Origin	Population	Pct (%)
Canadian	4,330	54.3%
English	2,905	36.4%
French	1,820	22.8%
Scottish	1,505	18.9%
Irish	1,260	15.8%
German	830	10.4%
North American Indian	485	6.1%
Dutch (Netherlands)	400	5.0%
Métis	275	3.4%
Acadian	170	2.1%

== Communities ==
- Acaciaville
- Ashmore
- Barton
- Bayview
- Bear River
- Brier Island
- Brighton
- Central Grove
- Centreville
- Conway
- Culloden
- Doucetteville
- East Ferry
- Freeport
- Gilberts Cove
- Hillgrove
- Jordantown
- Little River, Digby, Nova Scotia
- Marshalltown
- Mink Cove
- Morganville
- North Range
- Plympton
- Rossway
- Sandy Cove
- Seabrook
- Sissiboo Falls
- Smith's Cove
- Tiddville
- Tiverton
- Westport
- Weymouth
- Weymouth Falls
- Whale Cove

== Access routes ==
Highways and numbered routes that run through the district municipality, including external routes that start or finish at the municipal boundary:

- Highways
  - Hwy 101
- Trunk Routes
  - Trunk 1
- Collector Routes:
  - Route 217
  - Route 303
- External Routes:
  - None

== See also ==
- List of municipalities in Nova Scotia
