= Digby County =

Digby County Comté de Digby (French)
- County
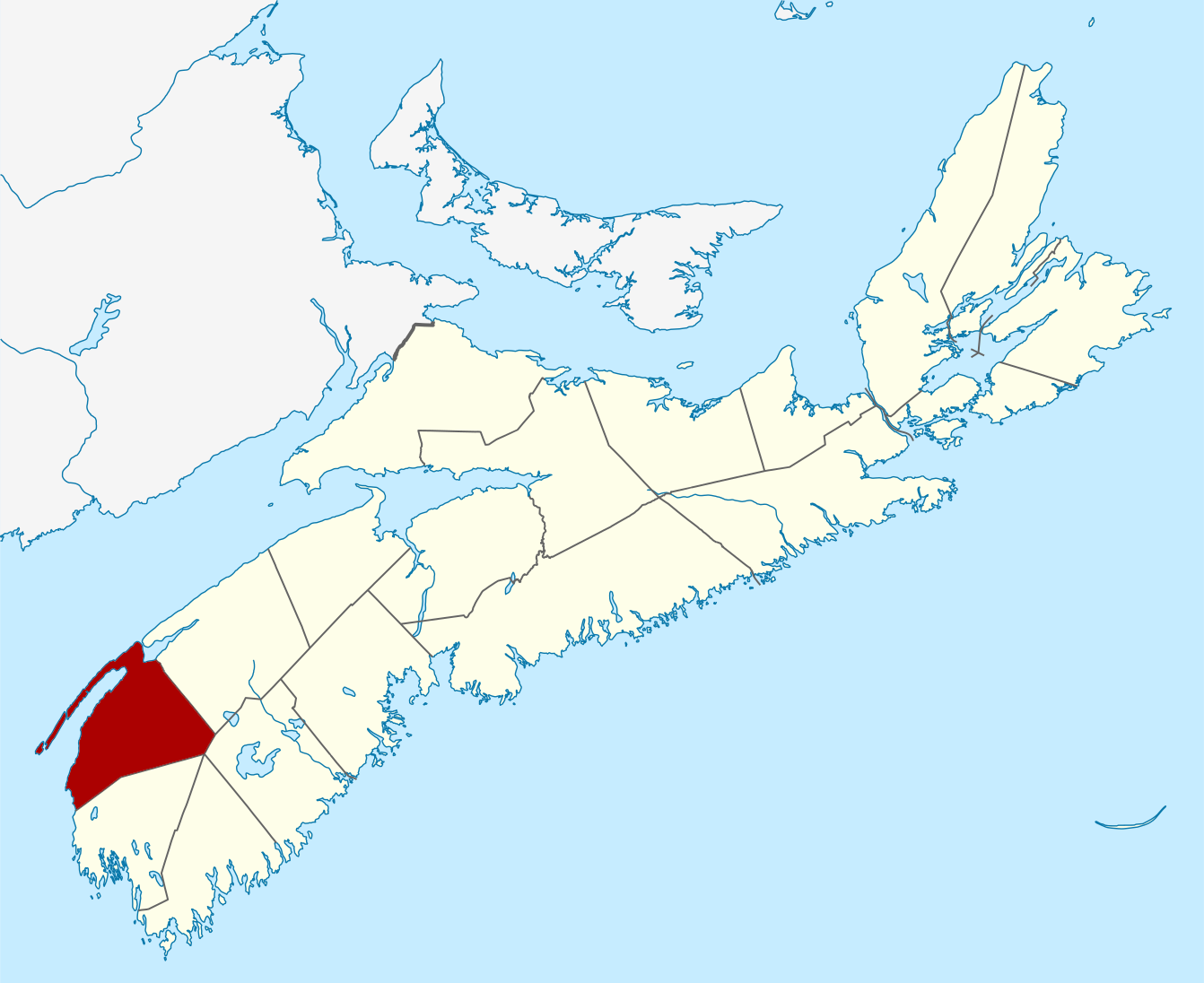
- Location of Digby County, Nova Scotia
- Coordinates: 44.3°N 65.8°W
- Country: Canada
- Province: Nova Scotia
- District municipalities: Clare / Digby
- Towns: Digby
- Established: 1837
- Divided into District Municipalities: April 17, 1879
- Electoral Districts Federal: Acadie—Annapolis
- Provincial: Digby-Annapolis / Clare

Area
  - Land: 2,512.28 km^{2} (970.00 sq mi)

Population (2021)
  - Total: 17,062
  - Density: 6.8/km^{2} (18/sq mi)
  - Change 2011-16: ▼1.5%
  - Census Rankings: District municipalities; Clare Digby: Towns; Digby: Reserves; Bear River 6: 8,813 (431 of 5,008); 7,986 (458 of 5,008) 2,092 (2,074 of 5,008) 101 (4,415 of 5,008)
- Time zone: UTC-4 (AST)
  - Summer (DST): UTC-3 (ADT)
- Area code: 902
- Dwellings: 9927
- Median income*: CA$38,284
- Median household income, 2005 (all households)

Digby County is a county in the Canadian province of Nova Scotia.

== History ==
It was named after the Township of Digby; this was named in honour of Rear Admiral Robert Digby, who dispatched HMS Atalanta to convey Loyalists from New York City in the spring of 1783 to Conway, which became known as Digby, as part of their evacuation and resettlement following the American Revolutionary War. The Crown resettled thousands of Loyalists in Nova Scotia and other areas of Canada. Digby County was established in 1837. Previously, from August 17, 1759, when Nova Scotia was first divided into counties, this area had been part of Annapolis County.

In 1861, Digby County was divided into two sessional districts: Digby and Clare. These were eventually incorporated as district municipalities in 1879.

In addition to these two district municipalities, the county contains the Town of Digby and part of the Bear River Indian (First Nations) reserve. Also, there is Digby Neck leading into the Bay of Fundy to Long Island and Brier Island.

== Demographics ==
As a census division in the 2021 Census of Population conducted by Statistics Canada, Digby County had a population of 17,062 living in 8,117 of its 9,681 total private dwellings, a change of −1.5% from its 2016 population of 17,323. With a land area of 2,512.28 km^{2} (970.00 sq mi), it had a population density of 6.8/km^{2} (17.6/sq mi) in 2021.

Population trend

Census	Population	Change (%)
2021	17,062	▼1.5%
2016	17,323	▼4.0%
2011	18,036	▼5.0%
2006	18,992	▼2.8%
2001	19,548	▼4.6%
1996	20,500	▼3.8%
1991	21,195	▼3.1%
1986	21,852	▲0.8%
1981	21,689	▲11.4%
1941	19,472	▲6.1%
1931	18,353	▼6.8%
1921	19,612	▼2.8%
1911	20,167	▼0.8%
1901	20,322	▲1.7%
1891	19,987	▲0.03%
1881	19,981	▲17.3%
1871	17,037	N/A

Mother tongue language (2011)

Language	Population	Pct (%)
English only	11,850	66.65%
French only	5,430	30.54%
Non-official languages	190	1.07%
Multiple responses	305	1.72%

Ethnic groups (2006)

Ethnic Origin	Population	Pct (%)
Canadian	9,265	49.5%
French	6,795	36.3%
English	5,000	26.7%
Scottish	2,655	14.2%
Irish	2,295	12.3%
Acadian	2,150	11.5%
German	1,235	6.6%
North American Indian	1,035	5.5%
Métis	830	4.4%
Dutch (Netherlands)	635	3.4%

== Communities ==
Towns

- Digby

Villages

- Freeport
- Tiverton
- Westport
- Weymouth

Reserves

- Bear River 6

District municipalities

- Municipality of the District of Clare
- Municipality of the District of Digby

== Access routes ==
Highways and numbered routes that run through the county, including external routes that start or finish at the county boundary:

- Highways
  - Hwy 101
- Trunk routes
  - Trunk 1
- Collector routes:
  - Route 217
  - Route 303
  - Route 340
- External routes:
  - None

== Museums ==
The county's history is preserved at the Admiral Digby Museum as well as several community museums.

== Notable people ==
- Elsie Charles Basque
- Coline Campbell
- Joseph Willie Comeau
- Phil Comeau
- Alfred Gilpin Jones
- Herbert Ladd Jones
- William M. Jones
- Sam Langford
- John Elkanah Morton
- George Nowlan
- Henri M. Robicheau
- Adam Smith
- Pop Smith
- Robert Thibault
- Martin Welch
- Maud Lewis

== See also ==
- List of communities in Nova Scotia
