= Deaths in April 1912 =

The following is a list of notable deaths in April 1912.

Entries for each day are listed alphabetically by surname. A typical entry lists information in the following sequence:

- Name, age, country of citizenship at birth, subsequent country of citizenship (if applicable), reason for notability, cause of death (if known), and reference.

== April 1912 ==
=== 1 ===
- Paul Brousse, 68, French socialist politician.
- George Fleming, 49, Scottish football player.

=== 2 ===
- Hedda Anderson, 79, Swedish writer and teacher.
- William Sullivan Barnes, 70, Canadian-American minister.
- Sir Alfred Dryden, 5th and 8th Baronet, 90, English cricket player and barrister.
- James Morris, 79, Australian politician.
- Ishimoto Shinroku, 58, Imperial Japanese Army general and Minister of War, tuberculosis.
- Edward O'Connor Terry, 68, English actor.

=== 3 ===
- Philip Argall, 57, Australian Test cricket umpire.
- Charles H. Prince, 74, American politician.
- A. V. Ragsdale, 58, American politician.
- Calbraith Perry Rodgers, 33, American aviation pioneer, plane crash.

=== 4 ===
- Charles Brantley Aycock, 52, American politician and 50th governor of North Carolina, heart attack.
- Isaac K. Funk, 72, American minister, lexicographer, and publisher.
- Meredith Howland, 79, American soldier and clubman.
- David Packham, 79, Australian politician.
- Robinson Souttar, 63, British Liberal Party politician.
- Carl G. von Iwonski, 81, American painter.

=== 5 ===
- Robert Dudley Adams, 82, Australian businessman, journalist, and author.
- Mikhail Mikhailovich Berezovsky, 64, Russian ornithologist and ethnologist.
- David Patrick Fisher, 62, New Zealand printer, trade unionist and public servant.
- James Jordan, 69, American judge.
- William Robertson, 48, New Zealand cricket player.
- André Fernand Thesmar, 69, French enameler.

=== 6 ===
- Chitto Harjo, 65/66, Native American leader.
- Richard Frommel, 57, German obstetrician and gynaecologist.
- Giovanni Pascoli, 56, Italian poet, writer, and classical scholar, liver cancer.
- Eleazar Roberts, 87, Welsh musician, writer and amateur astronomer.

=== 7 ===
- Abbott Lawrence Rotch, 51, American meteorologist, appendicitis.

=== 8 ===
- James A. Bushnell, 85, American businessman and banker.
- Emma Coradi-Stahl, 65, Swiss feminist.
- Edward Divers, 74, British chemist.
- Andrew Saks, 64, American businessman.
- Emily Soldene, 73, English singer, actress, theatre manager, novelist and columnist.

=== 9 ===
- Gottfried Strasser, 57, Swiss pastor, poet and writer.

=== 10 ===
- Christian Møinichen Havig, 87, Norwegian politician.
- Gabriel Monod, 68, French historian.

=== 11 ===
- John Rowland Dacey, 57, Irish-Australian politician, nephritis.
- James Montgomery Rice, 70, American soldier, lawyer, and public servant.
- Grand Duchess Vera Konstantinovna of Russia, 58, Russian noblewoman.
- Francis Charles Woods, 68, Scottish-American architect and organ-builder.

=== 12 ===
- Clara Barton, 90, American nurse and founder of the American Red Cross.
- Ernest Duchesne, 37, French physician, tuberculosis.
- Frederick Dent Grant, 61, American diplomat and son of U.S. President Ulysses S. Grant, heart failure.
- Albert Pieczonka, 84, German-American classical composer and pianist, pneumonia.

=== 13 ===
- Takuboku Ishikawa, 26, Japanese poet, tuberculosis.
- Robbins Little, 80, American lawyer and librarian.

=== 14 ===
- Henri Brisson, 76, Prime Minister of France.
- Horatio B. Knox, 55, American academic.
- Alonzo Clifton McClennan, 56, American physician.
- Alfred Pribram, 70, Bohemian internist.
- Rudolph Schwarz, 45, Austrian-American sculptor.

=== 15 ===
- Charles Gordon Ames, 83, American clergyman and lecturer.
- Harriet Fisher Mole, 70, British socialist, feminist, and trade union organiser.
- Jerome of Sandy Cove, Unidentified male amputee discovered on the beach of Sandy Cove, Canada.
- Felipe Salvador, 41, Filipino revolutionary, execution by hanging.
- Notable victims of the sinking of the RMS Titanic:
  - Thomas Andrews, 39, British businessman and shipbuilder, drowned.
  - John Jacob Astor IV, 47, American businessman, real estate developer, and writer.
  - Joseph Bell, 51, British sailor and chief engineer in the engine room of RMS Titanic.
  - David John Bowen, 20, Welsh boxer.
  - Archibald Butt, 46, American journalist and American Army officer.
  - Thomas Byles, 42, English catholic priest.
  - Roderick Chisholm, 43, Scottish shipbuilder and co-designer the RMS Titanic.
  - William Denton Cox, 29, British steward aboard RMS Titanic.
  - Walter Donald Douglas, 50, American business executive.
  - Annie Funk, 38, American missionary.
  - Jacques Futrelle, 37, American journalist and writer.
  - Luigi Gatti, 37, Italian businessman and restaurateur.
  - Sidney Leslie Goodwin, 1, British toddler known until 2007 as "The Unknown Child".
  - Benjamin Guggenheim, 46, American businessman.
  - John Harper, 39, Scottish baptist pastor.
  - Henry B. Harris, 45, American Broadway producer and theatre owner.
  - Wallace Hartley, 33, English violinist and bandleader on the RMS Titanic.
  - Charles Melville Hays, 55, American railroad executive.
  - Ann Elizabeth Isham, 50, American socialite.
  - Edward Austin Kent, 58, American architect.
  - Joseph Philippe Lemercier Laroche, 25, Haitian engineer.
  - René-Jacques Lévy, 37, French chemist.
  - Francis Davis Millet, 63, American painter, sculptor and writer.
  - William Mintram, 46, English fireman (stoker) on the RMS Titanic.
  - Harry Markland Molson, 55, Canadian politician and entrepreneur.
  - James Paul Moody, 24, British naval officer on the RMS Titanic.
  - Clarence Moore, 47, American sportsman and businessman.
  - William McMaster Murdoch, 39, Scottish sailor and First Officer on the RMS Titanic.
  - Eino Viljami Panula, 1, Finnish toddler.
  - Jack Phillips, 25, British sailor and senior wireless operator on the RMS Titanic.
  - Manuel Uruchurtu Ramírez, 39, Mexican lawyer and politician.
  - Edward Smith, 62, British naval officer on the RMS Titanic, drowned.
  - W. T. Stead, 62, British newspaper editor and investigative journalism pioneer.
  - Ida Straus, 63, American homemaker and wife of Isidor Straus.
  - Isidor Straus, 67, German-American businessman and politician.
  - John Thayer, 49, American businessman.
  - Frank M. Warren Sr., 63, American businessman.
  - George Dennick Wick, 58, American industrialist.
  - George Dunton Widener, 50, American businessman.
  - Harry Elkins Widener, 27, American businessman, and a son of George Dunton Widener.
  - Henry Tingle Wilde, 39, British sailor and Chief Officer on the RMS Titanic.
  - Duane Williams, 51, American lawyer.
  - John Wesley Woodward, 32, English musician on the RMS Titanic.
  - George Henry Wright, 62, Canadian businessman and philanthropist.

=== 16 ===
- James Peterkin Alexander, 76, Scottish-Canadian farmer and politician.
- Henry Bethune, 67, English cricket player.
- Knut Ekwall, 69, Swedish painter and illustrator.
- Edward Gabbett, 71, Ireland Anglican priest.
- Wilhelmine Heise, 74, Danish philanthropist.
- Orlando J. Hodge, 83, American lawyer and politician.
- Thomas G. Lawson, 76, American politician.
- Henry F. Thomas, 68, American physician and politician.

=== 17 ===
- William F. Harrity, 61, American lawyer and politician.
- August T. Koerner, 68, American businessman and politician.
- Don Giuseppe Rizzo, 48, Italian Catholic priest, politician and journalist.
- Ace Stewart, 43, American Major League Baseball player.

=== 18 ===
- Damer Leslie Allen, 34, Irish-British aviator, aviation accident.
- Hank Gehring, 31, American Major League Baseball player.
- William G. Hills, 70, American Army soldier during the American Civil War and recipient of the Medal of Honor.
- George Franklin Huff, 69, American politician.
- Martha Ripley, 68, American physician, suffragist, and professor of medicine.
- James D. Robinson, 71, Canadian political figure.
- Frederick Seddon, 40, British murderer, execution by hanging.
- Walter Clopton Wingfield, 78, British Army officer and inventor.

=== 19 ===
- Patricio Escobar, 69, President of Paraguay.
- Josua Lindahl, 68, Swedish American geologist and paleontologist.
- William McAleer, 74, American politician.

=== 20 ===
- Sam Barkley, 53, American Major League Baseball player.
- John N. Eckes, 67, American Union Army soldier during the American Civil War and recipient of the Medal of Honor.
- Marian Farquharson, 65, British naturalist and women's rights activist.
- Jacob Elias Friend, 54, American lawyer, businessman, and politician.
- Daniel Gault, 69, American newspaperman, educator and politician.
- Djóni í Geil, 62, Faroese craftsman, editor, and politician.
- Charles Harper, 69, Australia pastoralist, newspaper proprietor and politician.
- Harry Pears, 34, Australian rules football player.
- Pedro Lira Rencoret, 66, Chilean painter and art critic.
- Bram Stoker, 64, Irish author known for his 1897 horror novel Dracula, stroke.

=== 21 ===
- F. Benedict Herzog, 52, American electrical engineer, artist and photographer.
- Willoughby Wallace Hooper, 75, English military officer and photographer.
- Alexander McKay, 69, Canadian politician.
- Siri von Essen, 61, Finnish noblewoman and actress.
- Yung Wing, 83, Chinese-American diplomat and businessman, apoplectic shock.

=== 22 ===
- Heinrich Unverricht, 58, German internist.

=== 23 ===
- Alphonse Trémeau de Rochebrune, 75, French botanist, malacologist, and zoologist.

=== 24 ===
- Samuel Bourne, 77, British photographer, heart attack.
- Eiler Rasmussen Eilersen, 85, Danish landscape painter.
- Michael Flürscheim, 68, German economist and Georgist.
- Justin McCarthy, 81, Irish nationalist, historian, novelist and politician.
- Johan Frederik Thaulow, 71, Norwegian Army officer and physician.

=== 25 ===
- George William Knox, 59, American theologian and writer, pneumonia.
- Waclaw Rolicz-Lieder, 45, Polish poet and translator.
- Martin Schubert, 73, American Army officer during the American Civil War and recipient of the Medal of Honor.

=== 26 ===
- Toshio Aoki, 58, Japanese-American artist and painter.
- Eugene L. Demers, 69, American politician.
- Charles Perkins, 57, English cricket player.
- Hermann Zabel, 79, German botanist.

=== 27 ===
- Alfred John Church, 83, English classical scholar.
- Daniel Kimball Pearsons, 92, American physician and philanthropist.

=== 28 ===
- Jules Bonnot, 35, French bank robber, shot.
- Josh Bunce, 64, American Major League Baseball player and umpire in .
- Robert Dollard, 70, American attorney and politician.
- Robert A. Kerr, 71, American politician and friend of industrialist Andrew Carnegie
- Stefan Izbinsky, 27, Ukrainian chess master.
- Yuri Kimimasa, 82, Japanese businessman and politician.
- Michael Thomas Stenson, 73, Canadian politician.
- Otto Stichling, 46, German Art Nouveau sculptor.

=== 29 ===
- Henri Bouckaert, 41, French rower and Olympic champion.
- Subh-i-Azal, 81, Iranian religious leader.

=== 30 ===
- František Kmoch, 63, Czech composer and conductor.
- Francis Reed, 61, English cricket player
- Henry Sweet, 66, English philologist, phonetician and grammarian, pernicious anemia.
- John Taylor, 78, British architect.

== See also ==
- Lists of deaths by year
- April 1912
