= List of historic places in Digby County, Nova Scotia =

Digby County is a county in the Canadian province of Nova Scotia. This list compiles historic places recognized by the Canadian Register of Historic Places within the county.

== List of historic places ==
Name	Address	Coordinates	Government recognition (CRHP №)	Wikidata ID	Image
All Saints Anglican Church and Cemetery	10219 Route 217; Rossway NS	44°35′05″N 65°54′10″W	Nova Scotia (6236)	Q137300693	Upload Photo
Bayside Farm	580 Fort Point Road; Weymouth North NS	44°27′11″N 66°00′09″W	Weymouth North municipality (1315)	Q137300764	Upload Photo
Bayview United Church	1074 Lighthouse Road; Bay View NS	44°40′40″N 65°46′25″W	Bay View municipality (1316)	Q137300768	Upload Photo
Bear River Lighthouse	Evangeline Trail; Digby NS	44°37′06″N 65°41′19″W	Federal (20771)	Q28375738	More images
Boars Head Lighthouse	Boars Head Road; Tiverton NS	44°24′14″N 66°12′55″W	Federal (21194)	Q28375744	More images
Cape St. Marys Lighthouse	Lighthouse Road; Clare NS	44°05′09″N 66°12′39″W	Federal (20893)	Q45324387	More images
Centreville United Church	34 Trout Cove Road; Centreville NS	44°32′46″N 66°00′47″W	Centreville municipality (1319)	Q137300819	Upload Photo
Captain Cheney's Homestead	86 Shore Road; Little River NS	44°26′39″N 66°08′23″W	Little River municipality (1314)	Q137306585	Upload Photo
Church of the Nativity	321 Sandy Cove Road; Sandy Cove NS	44°29′25″N 66°05′32″W	Sandy Cove municipality (1318)	Q137324280	Upload Photo
Culloden Baptist Church	1643 Culloden Road; Culloden NS	44°39′19″N 65°50′02″W	Culloden municipality (1338)	Q137162665	Upload Photo
Dickson Residence (Captain John Squires Eldridge House)	46 Bayshore Road; Sandy Cove NS	44°29′32″N 66°05′22″W	Sandy Cove municipality (1372)	Q137324288	Upload Photo
Fitzgerald House	74 Fort Point Road; Weymouth NS	44°26′18″N 65°59′54″W	Weymouth municipality (1340)	Q137324366	Upload Photo
Former Saint Thomas Anglican Church	4668 Main Street; Weymouth NS	44°24′49″N 65°59′46″W	Weymouth municipality (1373)	Q137324373	Upload Photo
Former Southville Church of Christ	807 Langford Road; Southville NS	44°21′09″N 65°53′59″W	Southville municipality (1379)	Q137324381	Upload Photo
Gardenia Lodge-Savary House	No. 101 Highway; Plympton NS	44°30′41″N 65°54′23″W	Nova Scotia (7992)	Q137324394	Upload Photo
Gilbert's Cove Lighthouse	244 Lighthouse Road; Gilbert's Cove NS	44°29′39″N 65°57′08″W	Nova Scotia (1261)	Q32516998	More images
Haight Residence	1721 Ridge Road; Hillgrove NS	44°31′35″N 65°48′08″W	Hillgrove municipality (1374)	Q137324405	Upload Photo
Isaac LeBlanc House	33 Isaac LeBlanc Chemain; Church Point NS	44°19′31″N 66°07′10″W	Nova Scotia (5388)	Q137324459	Upload Photo
Little River United Baptist Church	Highway 217; Little River NS	44°26′34″N 66°08′57″W	Little River municipality (1339)	Q137324471	More images
Oddfellows Hall	7 Second Street; Westport NS	44°15′42″N 66°21′11″W	Westport municipality (1343)	Q137324510	Upload Photo
Payson House	4458 No. 1 Highway; Weymouth NS	44°24′17″N 65°59′56″W	Weymouth municipality (6494)	Q136484433	More images
Stephen Payson Homestead	4471 Highway Number one Weymouth NS	44°24′19″N 65°59′55″W	Weymouth municipality (1383)	Q137324521	More images
Pointe à Major Cemetery	245 Doucette Point Road; Belliveau's Cove NS	44°23′04″N 66°04′47″W	Belliveau's Cove municipality (16023)	Q137324536	Upload Photo
Prim Point Lighthouse	Lighthouse Road; Digby NS	44°41′28″N 65°47′11″W	Federal (20770)	Q7208142	More images
St. John the Baptist Church	No. 340 Highway; Corberrie NS	44°14′07″N 65°55′45″W	Nova Scotia (6238)	Q137324540	Upload Photo
Sainte Marie Church	1713 Highway No. 1 Church Point NS	44°20′02″N 66°06′58″W	Nova Scotia (5390)	Q422237	More images
Saint Peter's Church	5 Fort Point Branch; Weymouth North NS	44°26′19″N 65°59′40″W	Weymouth North municipality (1377)	Q137324580	Upload Photo
Sandy Cove United Baptist Church	350 Sandy Cove Road; Sandy Cove NS	44°29′25″N 66°05′24″W	Sandy Cove municipality (1381)	Q137324625	Upload Photo
Smith's Cove Baptist Meeting House and Temperance Hall	Highway No. 1 Smith's Cove NS	44°36′40″N 65°42′24″W	Nova Scotia (3077)	Q137324646	Upload Photo
Smith's Cove United Church	660 Highway No.1; Smith's Cove NS	44°36′45″N 65°42′10″W	Smith's Cove municipality (1384)	Q137324662	Upload Photo
Trinity Anglican Church National Historic Site of Canada	87 Queen Street; Digby NS	44°37′09″N 65°45′24″W	Federal (10584), Nova Scotia (7266)	Q23009319	More images
Ward House	215 Trout Cove Road; Centreville NS	44°32′48″N 66°01′41″W	Centreville municipality (1375)	Q137324683	Upload Photo
Westport United Baptist Church	50 Wellington Street; Westport NS	44°15′40″N 66°21′15″W	Nova Scotia (4098)	Q137324696	Upload Photo
Westway Inn	5 French Road; Plympton NS	44°30′16″N 65°54′58″W	Plympton municipality (1385)	Q137324706	Upload Photo
Weymouth Trading Post (Campbell's Store)	4613 Highway Number One; Weymouth NS	44°24′40″N 65°59′46″W	Weymouth municipality (1317)	Q136802766	More images
Zion United Church	325 Sandy Cove Road; Sandy Cove NS	44°29′27″N 66°05′32″W	Sandy Cove municipality (1382)	Q137324719	Upload Photo

== See also ==
- List of historic places in Nova Scotia
- List of National Historic Sites of Canada in Nova Scotia
- Heritage Property Act (Nova Scotia)
