= Municipality of the District of Clare =

Clare
- District municipality
- Municipality of the District of Clare; Municipalité du district de Clare
- Seal

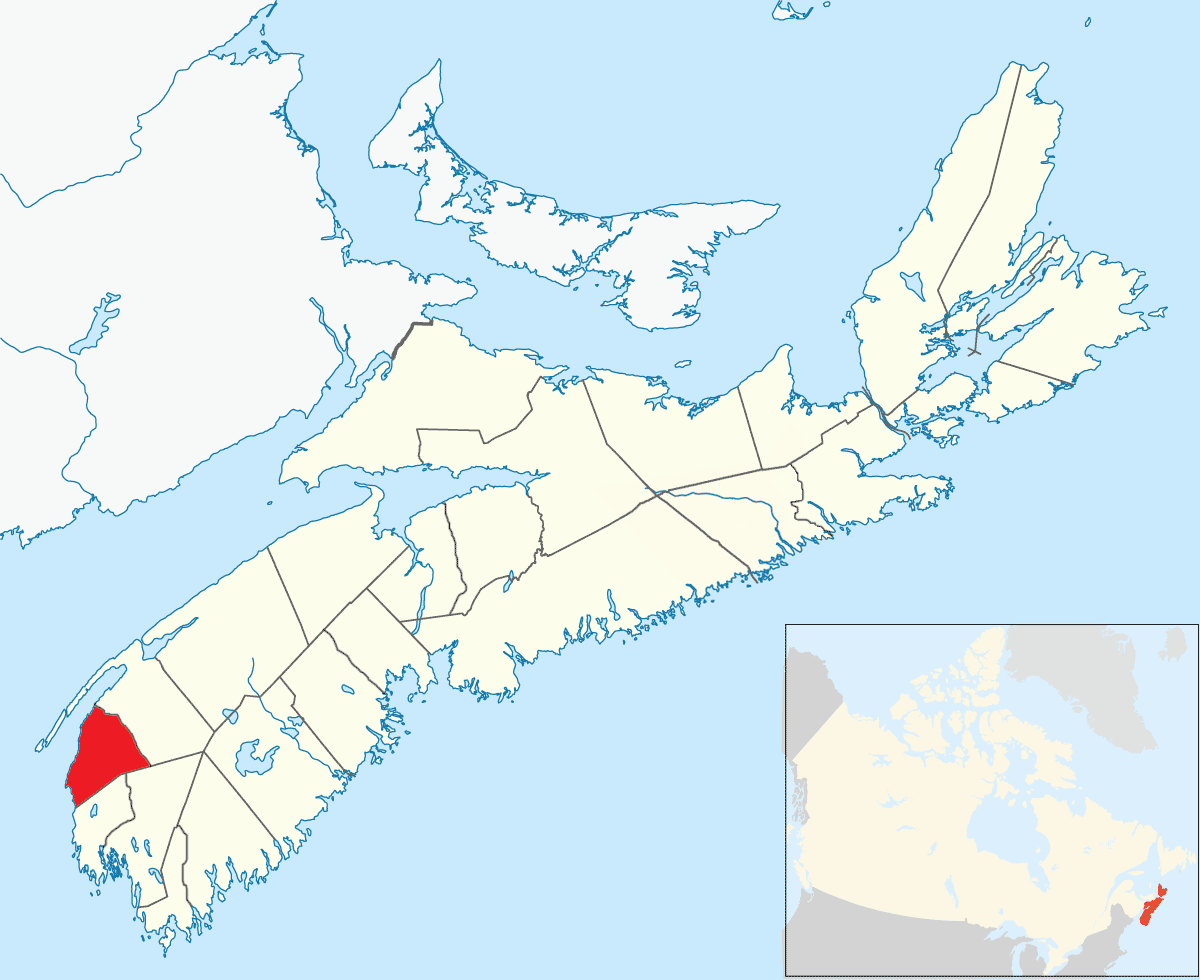
- Location of the Municipality of the District of Clare
- Coordinates: 44.333333°N 66.116667°W
- Country: Canada
- Province: Nova Scotia
- County: Digby
- Incorporated: April 17, 1879
- Electoral Districts Federal: Acadie—Annapolis
- Provincial: Clare

Government
  - Type: District of Clare Municipal Council
  - County seat: Little Brook
  - Warden: Yvon LeBlanc

Area
  - Land: 851.14 km^{2} (328.63 sq mi)

Population (2021)
  - Total: 7,678
  - Density: 9/km^{2} (23/sq mi)
  - Change 2016–21: ▼4.2%
- Time zone: UTC-4 (AST)
  - Summer (DST): UTC-3 (ADT)
- Area code: 902
- Dwellings: 4,681
- Median Income*: $41,450 CDN
- Website: Official website
- Median household income, 2005 (all households)

Clare, officially named the Municipality of the District of Clare, is a district municipality in south Nova Scotia, Canada. Statistics Canada classifies the district municipality as a municipal district.

== Geography ==
The Municipality of the District of Clare occupies the western half of Digby County. Most of the municipality's settled areas are located along St. Marys Bay, a sub-basin of the Gulf of Maine.

== History ==
The township was settled in 1768 by Acadian families who had returned to Nova Scotia from exile. Prior to the establishment of Clare, the Mi'kmaq knew the area as Wagweiik. The mouth of Salmon River is thought to be a traditional summer settlement of the Mi'kmaq and several artifacts have been found there, as well as at Meteghan, Major's Point and other sites [2]. Place names like Hectanooga, Mitihikan (Meteghan), and Chicaben (Church Point) are found in the area. They also had a principal settlement by River Allen near Cape Sainte-Marie used for fishing and as a canoe route [3]. The Mi'kmaq also used a fishing weir system for catching mackerel and herring that they taught to the new settlers, which they continued to use until well into the 1900s, and fish drying techniques that continue today. They also caught eels, seals, clams, urchins and other sea life, as well as berries, medicinal plants and other coastal resources. As new settlers arrived in the 1760s–1780s, the Mi'kmaq were instrumental in helping the new Acadians survive and become skilled in surviving the harsh winters along the coast. By the 1800s most Mi'kmaq had left the area to live on the Reserve in Bear River, while still returning for fishing, hunting, trade and ceremony throughout the year. It was named "Clare" by then Lieutenant Governor of Nova Scotia, Michael Francklin. The name comes from the County Clare in Ireland.

== Present day ==
The municipality is inhabited by many Acadians and their descendants and conducts its business in both English and French, although the official language is English and both languages are used. The only French university in the province of Nova Scotia, Université Sainte-Anne, is located in Church Point (Pointe-de-l'Église / Chicoben) and 47% of the adult population has a postsecondary education. The area hosts the oldest and largest annual Acadian Festival, as well as Nova Scotia's first Gran Fondo cycling event, which was cancelled in 2020 due to COVID-19, but resumed again in 2023.

== Demographics ==
Historical population
Year	Pop.	±%
1981	9,598	—
1986	9,740	+1.5%
1991	9,654	−0.9%
1996	9,298	−3.7%
2001	9,067	−2.5%
2006	8,813	−2.8%
2011	8,319	−5.6%
2016	8,018	−3.6%
2021	7,678	−4.2%
Source: Statistics Canada:

In the 2021 Census of Population conducted by Statistics Canada, the Municipality of the District of Clare had a population of 7,678 living in 3,607 of its 4,393 total private dwellings, a change of −4.2% from its 2016 population of 8,018. With a land area of 851.14 km^{2} (328.63 sq mi), it had a population density of 9.0/km^{2} (23.4/sq mi) in 2021.

Mother tongue language (2016)
Language	Population	Pct (%)
French	4,775	62.19%
English	2,775	33.64%
Other languages	85	1.04

Ethnic Groups (2016)
Ethnic Origin	Population	Pct (%)
Canadian	3795	47.3%
French	3380	42.1%
Acadian	2215	27.6%
Métis	1395	17.3%
English	1310	16.3%
Irish	860	10.7%
Scottish	570	7.1%
First Nations	485	6.0%
German	260	3.2%

== Communities ==
- Bangor
- Bear Cove
- Beaver River
- Belliveau Cove
- Briar Lake
- Cape St. Mary's
- Church Point
- Comeauville
- Concession
- Corberrie
- Easton
- Grosses Coques
- Hassett
- Havelock
- Hectanooga
- Lake Doucette
- Little Brook
- Mavillette
- Maxwellton
- Maxwellton Station
- Mayflower
- Meteghan
- Meteghan River
- Meteghan Station
- Moody's Corner
- New Edinburgh
- New Tusket
- Richfield
- Salmon River
- Saulnierville
- Saulnierville Station
- Southville
- St. Alphonse de Clare
- St. Benoni
- St. Bernard
- St. Joseph
- St. Martin de Clare
- Weaver Settlement
- Woodvale

== Access routes ==
Highways and numbered routes that run through the district municipality, including external routes that start or finish at the municipal boundary:

- Highways
  - Hwy 101
- Trunk Routes
  - Trunk 1
- Collector Routes:
  - Route 340
- External Routes:
  - None

== Culture ==
Musical groups from the area include:

- Grand Dérangement
- Blou
- Radio Radio
- BeauPhare
- DPS
- Sweet Tuesday
- Cy

The song M'en allant par Saulnierville Station written by Denis Comeau and recorded by Suroît is a song about the local community of Saulnierville Station.

Musicians from the area include:

- P'tit Belliveau
- Arthur Comeau
- Johnny Comeau
- Jacobus
- Marc à Paul à Jos
- Kenneth Saulnier
- Micaela Comeau [Just Micci]

Filmmaker:

- Phil Comeau

== See also ==
- List of francophone communities in Nova Scotia
- List of municipalities in Nova Scotia
