= Concession, Nova Scotia =

Village in Nova Scotia, Canada

Coordinates: 44°16′51.51″N 66°4′22.93″W

Concession in Nova Scotia

Concession (/kɒnˈsɛsioʊn/) is a small rural residential village located in the Clare District of Digby County, Nova Scotia, Canada. It encompasses a sprawling forested area featuring many lakes and streams. These include Belliveau Lake, Victor Lake, Spectacle Lake, Lac D'en Bas, and the Meteghan River.

Its inhabitants are mostly situated on the axis of the Patrice and Second Division Roads and along the lake shores.

== History ==
The first Acadian settlers arrived in Concession in 1818. The Second Division Road was noted in historical documents by 1830.

The first wave of Acadians in Clare settled along the shores of St. Mary's Bay from present-day St. Bernard to Little Brook upon tracts of land known as the "Bastarache Concession" granted to them by the British in May 1775. In January 1801, other tracts were granted, the "Deuxième Concession" (the Second Division), and the "Troisième Concession" (the Third Division) lying between the first grants along St. Mary's Bay and the New Tusket settlements deeper inland. The village was simply referred to as "les concessions" and retains that name to this day.

Concession enjoyed railway service from 1879 to 1990. It is now the site of exit 29 of Highway 101.

The village was originally served by its own post office beginning in 1886. It is now Rural Route #1 served by the Church Point post office, postal code B0W 1M0.

Concession had its own elementary school from the 1920s to the mid-1970s when the local schools were consolidated. The building was converted into a window and woodworking factory.

Electrical and telephone utilities became available here in the late 1950s.

For many years the inhabitants engaged in agriculture and timbering (lumber, firewood), lumber was sawn at various mills in the village and conveyed to markets via the St. Mary's Bay shores or by railroad.

The late 1950s saw the establishment of several large hog farms in Concession which operated until 2007 when low commodity prices and high overhead costs forced their closures.

The most prominent structure in the village is the Notre Dame du Mont Carmel Roman Catholic Church. Built in 1902 on the hill near the intersection of the Patrice and Second Division Roads, it is a landmark that can be seen for miles around.

Victor Lake in Concession is home to the Camp Jeunesse Acadienne (CJA), a youth summer camp that was at one time ran by nuns; however, it is now staffed by summer students sponsored by government summer jobs programs. The CJA is also the starting point for the extremely popular annual Clare Canoe Trip every Easter weekend. The canoes travel the Meteghan and Salmon River systems in the heightened springtime melt waters.

At a nearby home stands the largest Horse Chestnut tree in Nova Scotia. It is 136 centimetres (54 in) in diameter and 17 metres (66 ft) tall.

Concession's Lac D'en Bas was the first site of the illegal introduction of the invasive chain pickerel fish species by a sports fisherman. This predator has decimated native fish stocks there and in other lakes and watersheds of southern Nova Scotia where it has been subsequently introduced.

A large Catholic cemetery, Notre Dame Du Mont Carmel/Our Lady of Mount Carmel, is located in the community of Concession. A genealogical index project, completed in 2013, indicates over 850 burials in the cemetery.
