= St. Marys Bay, Nova Scotia =

Bay in Nova Scotia, Canada

Coordinates: 44°25′N 66°06′W

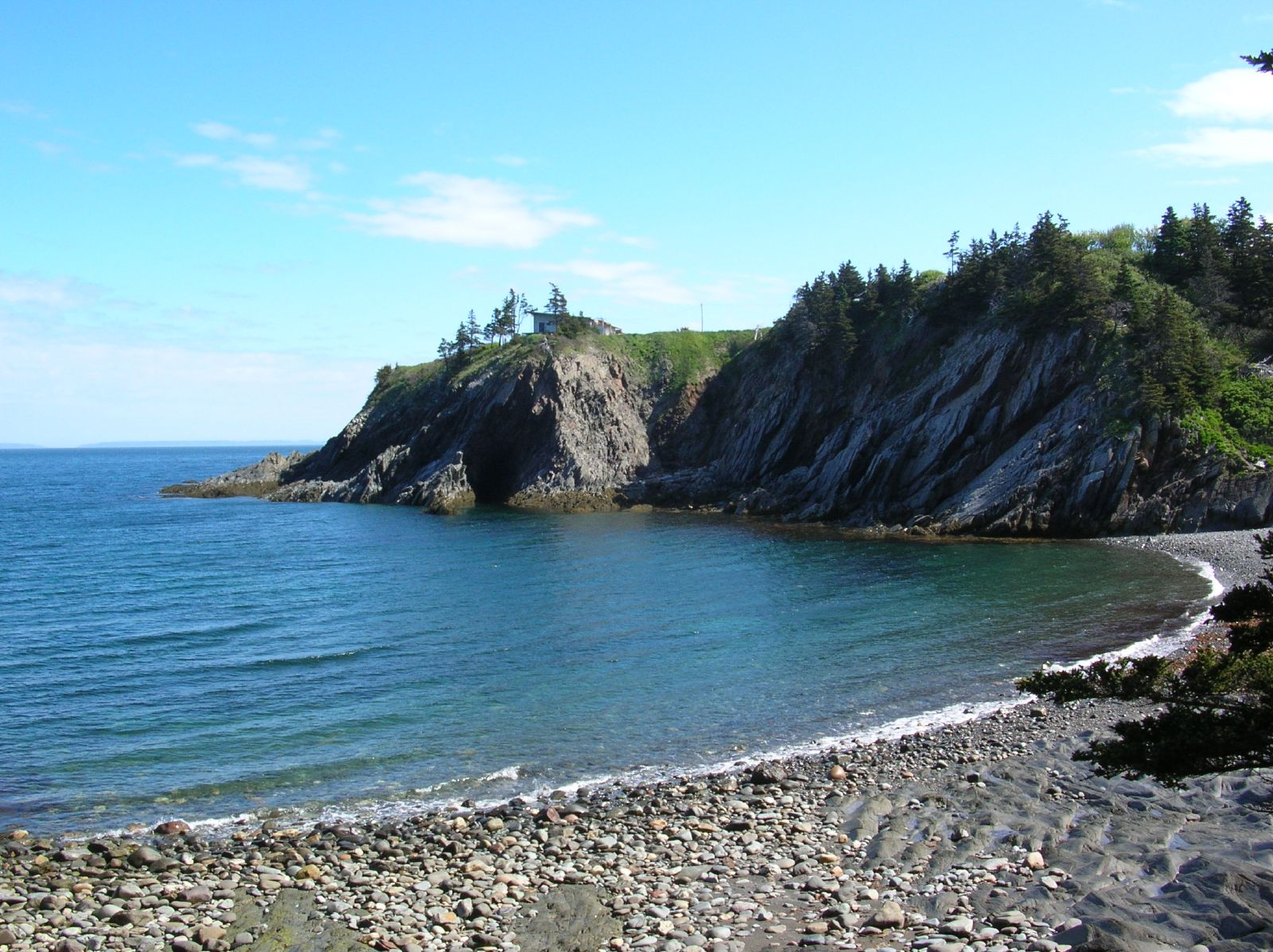
St. Marys Bay as seen from Smuggler's Cove Provincial Park, Digby County, Nova Scotia

St. Marys Bay (French: Baie Sainte-Marie, Miꞌkmaq: Wagweiik) south western Nova Scotia, Canada, is surrounded by the modern municipal districts of Clare Municipal District and Digby.

The principal sources of the Acadian economy are fishing and the French-language university, Université Sainte-Anne.

== Pre-European contact ==
The native Mi'kmaw have occupied Oostitukum (Digby Neck), the mainland shore, and the waters between since before the arrival of Europeans, and the bay is known to the Mi'kmaw as Wagweiik. The mouth of Salmon River is thought to be a traditional summer settlement of the Mi'kmaw; several artifacts have been found there, as well as at Meteghan and Major's Point. A site known as BcDM-01 by Erskine situated at Major's Point in Belliveau Cove is described: "Beside the road to the shore about .40km from the sea, a field is full of late Indian Garden Chips. On the shore, Rene Belliveau found a small cluster of shallow hearths, probably where Indians waited for the tides to turn. Chips were of the late Indian Gardens, and one was of New Brunswick green quartzite. Place names like Hectanooga, Mitihikan (Meteghan), and Chicaben (Church Point) are found in the area.

The earliest European records come from Samuel de Champlain and Pierre Dugua, Sieur de Mons from 1604, and include details of their first expedition. The sakmowk of Kespukwitk district, and Grand Chief of the other six indigenous districts at the time was Henri Membertou, who welcomed the French explorers and settlers at Port Royal (today named Annapolis Royal, and an hour's drive from here). Membertou died in 1611 at age 103.

== Post-European contact ==
The Baie Ste. Marie was settled by Acadians in 1768 on their return, a decade after the British expulsion, but the land was not suitable for the agriculture they had practiced in Port Royal for the previous 150 years, so they turned to the sea to fish. Apart from the French explorations of 1604 led by Pierre Dugua de Mons, who was accompanied by Samuel de Champlain, there are no discovered records of any trading posts or expeditions to Saint Marys Bay by either French or British. It is asserted by one source that the Mi'kmaq were not interested in agriculture, and the settlers land clearing of mostly dyked swamps, did not affect the Mi'kmaq's hunting or fishing grounds, or immediately drive away game.

By the 1800s, the Mi'kmaq had settled on the nearby Bear River Reserve, while still returning to the area for fishing, hunting, trade, and ceremony throughout the year. In one record many also returned during the 1800s to attend mass at Saint Mary's Church in Church Point, presided by Father Jean-Mandé Sigogne. In an 1816 letter, Father Sigogne wrote "Hordes of Mi'kmaq gather with their children, during certain seasons at my church, some from as far away as 300 miles"

The 1871 Census in the sub-district of St. Mary's Bay recorded the number of Mi'kmaq to be "none found", while the 1901 census recorded 8,655 people in the Municipality of Clare.

== Geography ==
A sub-basin of the Gulf of Maine, the bay's southeastern shore is formed by mainland Nova Scotia, while its northwestern shore is formed by the Digby Neck, Long Island, and Brier Island.

The bay bifurcates the two municipal districts in Digby County, with the bilingual Clare Municipal District located on the mainland portion (southeastern shore) and the Digby Neck being part of the Digby Municipal District, which also occupies the eastern half of the county.

These bodies of water have shaped life on Digby Neck in several ways. Their tides are among the highest in the world, spanning 50 feet (16 metres) in places. The rich and varied flora and fauna of the bays are a result of this tidal action. Regularly exposed swaths of wet ocean floor create a special environment for the species that inhabit these regions. Tidal action also causes a stirring up of the water, allowing whales to feed easily on agitated plankton. This is one reason why the Bay of Fundy is world-renowned for its whale watching trips.

Shipbuilding, once an economic force in the area, was facilitated by the tides. Dry docks allowed ships to be built and floated without moving them, a significant advantage given the size and weight of a large boat. Weir fishing also benefits from the tides. At high tide, the weir is submerged; fish swim into the weir, and at low tide, the fishermen row in and scoop up the fish that are trapped.

Major communities situated on St. Marys Bay include Sandy Cove, Weymouth, Belliveaus Cove, Comeauville, Saulnierville, and Meteghan.

Public parks are located at Meteghan (Smugglers Cove Provincial Park), Cape St. Marys, (Cape Cove Beach/Mavilette Beach Provincial Park), and Plympton (Savary Picnic Park).
