= Radio Radio (band) =

Canadian electro hip-hop band

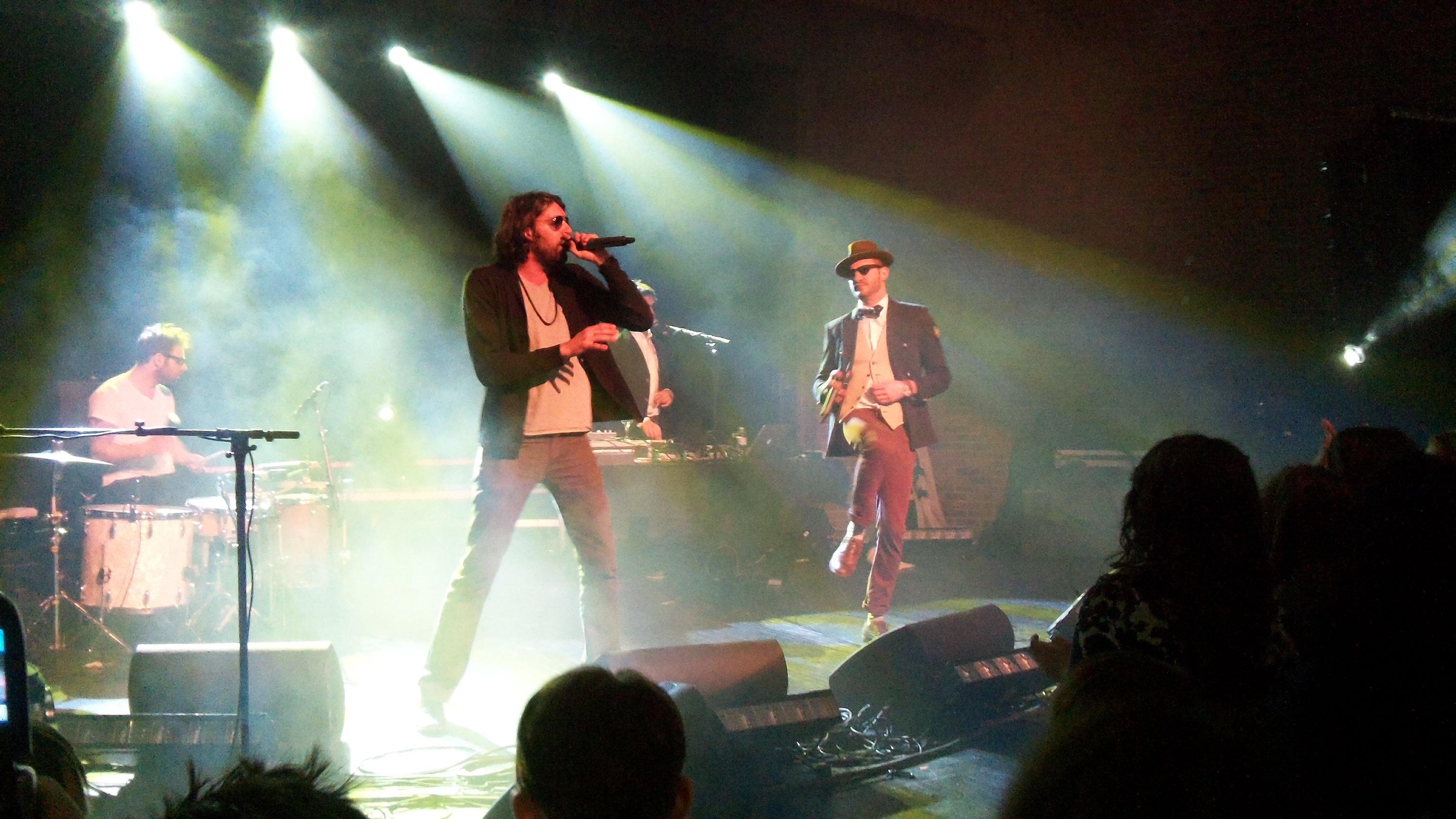
- Radio Radio 2012

Background information
- Origin: Clare, Nova Scotia, Canada
- Genres: electro rap hip hop
- Years active: 2007–present
- Label: Bonsound Records
- Members: Gabriel Louis Bernard Malenfant; Jacques Alphonse Doucet
- Past members: Timothée Jésus; Valentin Richard; Alexandre Arthur Bilodeau
- Website: laradioradio.com

Radio Radio is a Canadian electro hip-hop band formed in 2007 from Clare, Nova Scotia, and Moncton, New Brunswick, Canada. The duo rap in Chiac, an Acadian French dialect.

== History ==
The hip-hop/rap group Jacobus et Maleco, from Clare in St. Mary's Bay, Nova Scotia, was formed in 2001 by Jacques Alphonse Doucet alias Jacobus, Marc Comeau alias Maleco, and Alexandre Bilodeau alias DJ Alexandre. After the departure of Maleco, the decision was made to change the name of the group to Radio Radio.

Radio Radio released their first EP entitled Télé-Télé in 2007. During their promotional tour in Montréal, they were interviewed on Christiane Charette's radio show broadcast on la Première Chaîne.

In April 2008, the band released their first full-length album Cliché Hot on Bonsound Records. They received a nomination in the "Revelation of the year" (Révélation de l'année) category, at the Félix Award gala, where they also performed.

Radio Radio composed a song and produced a video for the special end-of-year presentation of Infoman, a television program hosted by Jean-René Dufort, which was broadcast on Radio-Canada.

In 2010, Radio Radio released a second album, Belmundo Regal on label Bonsound Records, which was on the short list for the 2010 Polaris Music Prize. They also won the Miroir Award (Prix Miroir) for Urban and Contemporary Music at the Quebec City Summer Festival (Festival d'été de Québec). In January 2011, Radio Radio won The 10th Annual Independent Music Awards in the Electro/Hip-Hop category for Belmundo Regal.

In 2012, Radio Radio won best hip hop album at the ADISQ and East-Coast music awards for their third album Havre de Grace. HdG was made possible by collaborating with outside collaborators: Horace Trahan in Louisiana and Renji Condoré a.k.a. Mamoru Kobayakawa who co-wrote most of the songs on the album with Alexandre Bilodeau a.k.a. Arthur Comeau a.k.a. Zander McQuigan a.k.a. Nom de Plume.

Radio Radio have played and will be seen playing in festivals such as Les FrancoFolies de Montréal, Osheaga 2008, South by Southwest 2010, the 2010 Winter Olympics, Festival International de Louisiane in Lafayette and many more. The band has also played at Woodstock. In 2013, they were one of the closing acts for the Canada Day Festivities in Ottawa.

In February 2014, Radio Radio were invited musical guests on SNL Québec's premiere show. The show aired on February 8, 2014, with guest host Louis-José Houde.

The group released Light the Sky, its first fully-English album, in 2016.

Their song "Jacuzzi" was featured in the videogame NHL 2K11

== Discography ==
- 2007: Télé Télé
- 2008: Cliché hot
- 2010: Belmundo Regal
- 2012: Havre de Grace
- 2014: Ej Feel Zoo
- 2016: Light the Sky
- 2021: À la Carte

== Members ==
- Gabriel Louis Bernard Malenfant, formerly known as Tex (from Moncton, New Brunswick)
- Jacques Alphonse Doucet, formerly known as Jacobus (from Clare, Nova Scotia)

== Past members ==
- Timothée "Timo" Valentin Jésus Richard
- Arthur Comeau a.k.a. Xanadu Popule a.k.a. Art Com a.k.a. Ben HURR a.k.a. Alexandre Arthur Bilodeau, formerly known as Lex
- Jaida "Clambuckets" MacDonald a.k.a. Kelly Randz
