= Jacuzzi (disambiguation) =

Jacuzzi is a company producing whirlpool bathtubs and spas. The term 'Jacuzzi' is often used generically to refer to any bathtub with underwater massage jets.

Jacuzzi may also refer to:

- Hot tub
- Candido Jacuzzi (1903–1986), Italian-American inventor
- Romain Jacuzzi (born 1984), French footballer
- Jacuzzi Splot, a character in the light novel and anime series Baccano!
- a song by Canadian hip-hop band Radio Radio from the 2008 album Cliché Hot
- a song by Finnish singer Sanni Kurkisuo
