= Culloden =

Culloden (Scottish Gaelic: Cùil Lodair) may refer to any of the following:

== Geography ==
=== Canada ===
- Culloden, Nova Scotia, a small community in Digby County
- Culloden, Ontario, a village in the township of South-West Oxford
- Culloden, Prince Edward Island, a settlement in Queens County

=== United Kingdom ===
- Culloden, Highland, a village in Scotland, near Inverness

=== United States ===
- Culloden, Georgia, a city in Monroe County
- Culloden, West Virginia, a census-designated place in Cabell and Putnam counties

== Historical events ==
- Battle of Culloden, a battle which took place in Scotland in 1746, ending the last Jacobite Rising

== Institutions ==
- Culloden Academy, a secondary school in Scotland

== People ==
- Baron Culloden, a royal barony in the peerage of the United Kingdom
- Xan Windsor, Lord Culloden (b. 2007), an infant relative of the British Royal family, son of the Earl of Ulster and grandson of the Duke of Gloucester

== Popular culture ==
- Culloden (film), a fictional presentation of the Battle of Culloden

== Ships ==
- HMS Culloden, the name of several former ships of the Royal Navy
