= Little Brook =

Little Brook may refer to:

- Little Brook, New Jersey, an unincorporated community located within Lebanon Township in Hunterdon County, New Jersey, United States
- Little Brook, Nova Scotia, a community located in the Clare Municipal District in Digby County, Nova Scotia, Canada

== See also ==
- Little Flat Brook, a 12.7-mile-long (20.4 km) tributary of Flat Brook in Sussex County, New Jersey in the United States
- Littlebrook Power Station in Dartford, Kent
- Lord Littlebrook (1929–2016), professional name of the British midget wrestler Eric Tovey
