= Belmundo Regal =

Studio album by Radio Radio
- Released: 2 March 2010
- Genre: Canadian hip hop
- Length: 48:30
- Label: Bonsound

Radio Radio chronology
Cliché Hot (2008)	Belmundo Regal (2010)	Havre de Grace (2012)

Belmundo Regal is the second studio album by Canadian hip hop group Radio Radio.

== Reception ==
In its review of the album, The Gazette wrote, "Radio Radio is, quite simply, the best hip-hop act to come out of Canada in a while."

The album was a shortlisted nominee for the 2010 Polaris Music Prize, and for the Juno Award for Francophone Album of the Year in 2011.

== Track listing ==
No.	Title	Length
1.	"Cargué dans ma chaise"	3:49
2.	"Ej savais pas mieux"	4:29
3.	"9 Piece Luggage Set"	3:18
4.	"Dekshoo"	3:26
5.	"Guess What?"	4:25
6.	"Enfant spécial"	4:05
7.	"Tômtôm"	3:21
8.	"Sur la galavante"	4:47
9.	"Saint-Pétersbourg"	4:10
10.	"Kenny G Non-Stop"	4:17
11.	"Hayo"	4:45
12.	"L'Épopée de Belmundo"	3:51
