= Église Sainte-Marie, Church Point, Nova Scotia =

Church in Nova Scotia, Canada

Coordinates: 44°20′2.9″N 66°6′57.8″W

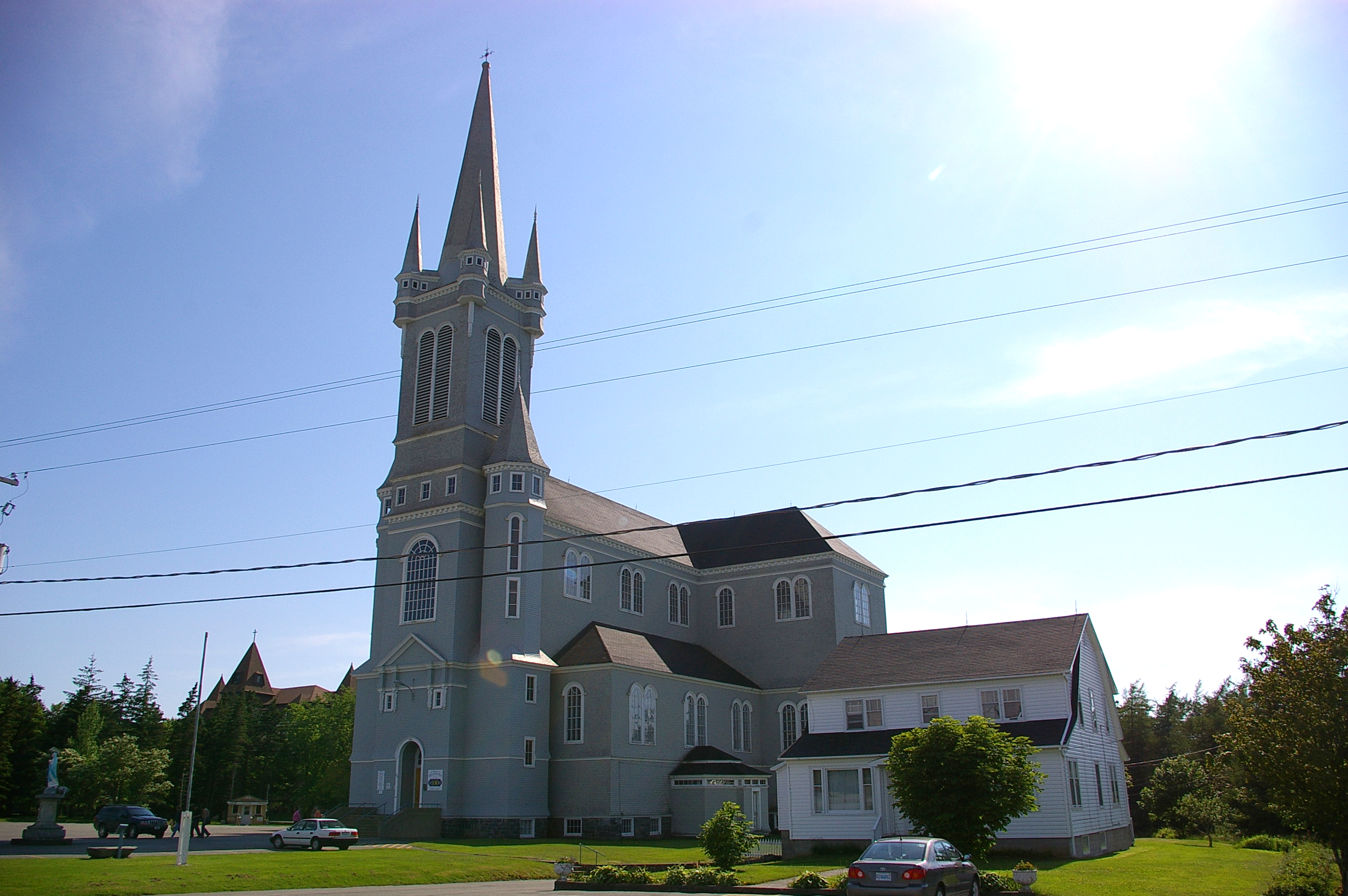
Église Sainte-Marie

Église Sainte-Marie is a former Catholic church in Church Point, Nova Scotia, Canada. It is one of the largest and tallest wooden buildings in North America. Built in the form of a cross, the church nave measures 58 metres (190 feet) in length, with transepts that are 41 m (135 ft) across. The church spire rises 56 m (184 ft) from floor to steeple, with its cross adding another 1.67 m (5 ft 6 in). Originally 4.6 m (15 ft) taller, the church steeple was struck by lightning in 1914, requiring part of the spire to be rebuilt. The church was officially deconsecrated on November 24, 2023.

== History ==
The first church built in the Church Point area, part of Nova Scotia's French Shore, was in Grosses Coques. Built in 1774, it was a rough chapel to serve the needs of Acadians returning from Massachusetts, and other areas, following the Great Upheaval, the deportation of the Acadians. A second chapel was built in 1786 on a point of land jutting into St. Mary's Bay, giving rise to the name "Church Point".

A third church was built following the arrival of Jean-Mandé Sigogne, the first resident priest. This church was built along the main road in the community, where the parish cemetery is now located, rather than on the point. A large number of Mi'kmaq visited him at Sainte-Marie and attended his services at regular intervals. A bilingual Mi'kmaq-French catechism used by Sigogne at this church has survived and is now held by the National Archives in Ottawa. The church burned down in September 1820. It was rebuilt in a classical Georgian style, and served the community from 1829 to 1905, when the present church was opened.

Construction on the present church began in 1903. Father Pierre-Marie Dagnaud, a Eudist Roman Catholic priest, was appointed the head of Collège Sainte-Anne in 1899, thereby becoming the parish priest of St. Mary's. He decided on the construction of a grand church, and hired Arthur Regnault of Rennes, France as his architect. The church was built by master carpenter Léo Melanson, with the assistance of 1500 parishioners.

Due to dwindling attendance and rising maintenance/repair cost, the church held its last service on Christmas Eve of 2019. With repair cost estimated at $3 million, the Société Édifice Sainte-Marie de la Pointe worked on raising the funds required with a deadline of 2021.

The church was officially deconsecrated on November 24, 2023.

In January 2024, the Archdiocese of Halifax-Yarmouth put the building up for sale.

In October 2024, the Archdiocese issued a request for demolition proposals and applied to have the church’s provincial heritage designation removed. In late 2024, another group, Association Sainte-Marie heritage et développement stepped up and is currently working to save the structure, slated for demolition as early as Summer 2025.

== Construction ==
The design of the church was influenced by the architecture of the famous chateaux of the Loire Valley and by the design of the church in Father Dagnaud's home town of Bains-sur-Oust, France. The central steeple is flanked by a pair of turrets, with four more turrets surrounding the spire.

The church is exposed to the strong winds from St. Mary's Bay, so 40 tonnes (44 short tons) of stone ballast were used to stabilize the steeple, and canvas, rather than plaster, was used for the walls.

The steeple holds three bronze bells imported from France, the largest weighing almost 800 kilograms (1,800 pounds).

== Interior ==
The interior of Église Sainte-Marie features a high, vaulted ceiling lit by a row of clerestory windows, below which runs a band of Romanesque arches around the church. The walls are painted white, and nine flower-edged tableaux are painted on the central ceiling vaults. In the 1960s, white oak pews replaced the original chairs that were used for seating.

The church attracts thousands of tourists annually, and a public museum room was established inside the church in 1970. The museum is now closed, but used to feature a reliquary handcrafted by an Acadian artist from the region and a collection of religious and liturgical artifacts.

== Preservation Efforts ==
=== Association Sainte-Marie Héritage et Développement (ASMHD) ===
Founded in January 2025, this community association aims to save the church, which is currently threatened with demolition as early as summer 2025. Co-chaired by Stéphanie St-Pierre and Gabrielle Bardall, the group has raised funds through GoFundMe for a professional engineering assessment of the church’s structure.

=== Société Édifice Sainte-Marie de la Pointe (SÉSMP) ===
Active from 2013 to 2022, this non-profit undertook fundraising and planning initiatives in partnership with the CDÉNÉ. In 2018, Bloom Consulting conducted a study, but efforts stalled due to a lack of interest from national consultants and financial support. The organization eventually ceased its activities.

=== Heritage Advocacy and Support ===
In May 2025, ICOMOS Canada issued a Heritage Alert urging the Archdiocese to halt demolition plans, maintain the church's heritage designation, and commit to a conservation strategy with public funding.

The Heritage Trust of Nova Scotia and National Trust for Canada have also voiced concern, noting the church's architectural uniqueness as the tallest wooden church in North America and its endangered status.

== Community and Future Prospects ==
The Sainte-Marie Héritage et Développement association emphasizes the church's value not just as a religious structure, but as a potential cultural and economic asset for the region, including tourism opportunities.

ICOMOS Canada has recommended integrating the site into Canada’s national heritage strategy through Parks Canada and developing a sustainable conservation plan.
