= Moodys Corner, Nova Scotia =

Community in Nova Scotia, Canada

Coordinates: 44°8′58.02″N 65°56′2.16″W

Moodys Corner in Nova Scotia

Moodys Corner is a community in the Canadian province of Nova Scotia, located in the District of Clare in Digby County.
