= Jerome of Sandy Cove =

Unidentified man found in Nova Scotia in 1863

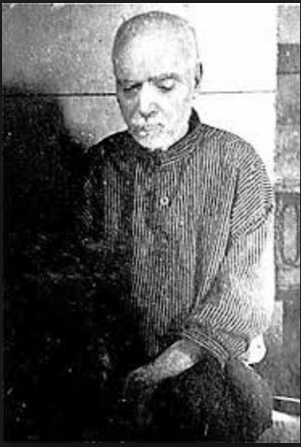
Described as "a well built man and appeared to be between 75 and 80 years of age, having an intelligent look, and a well-shaped head"; Daily Echo, 1912

Jerome (also spelled Jérôme; c. 1830s – April 15, 1912) was an unidentified man discovered on the beach of Sandy Cove, Digby, Nova Scotia, Canada, on September 8, 1863. He was found with both legs cut off to stumps, and when questioned by locals he said very little, suggesting he did not speak English or French. When asked for his name he mumbled something that resembled "Jerome", and so that was how he became known.

== Discovery ==
He was found by an 8-year-old boy named George Colin "Collie" Albright, and brought to the Albright home in the village of Digby Neck to be nursed back to health. Both of Jerome's legs had been amputated just above the knees, with evidence that it had been done by a skilled surgeon. The stumps were only partially healed and still bandaged when he was found. He was also suffering from cold and exposure.

Many people eager to know more about him visited his sick bed, and through this it was discovered that he could not (or did not want to) understand French, Latin, Italian, or Spanish. He apparently shunned the attention of these curious onlookers, growling like a dog at unwanted guests. The man's hands were noted as being too soft for him to be a manual labourer, and he was described as being Mediterranean in appearance.

The Albrights struggled to support another mouth to feed, and Jerome was passed from house to house for a while until the mainly Baptist community of Digby Neck decided from his appearance that he must be a Catholic, and sent him to the neighbouring French community of Meteghan. The government of Nova Scotia also voted a special stipend of two dollars a week to support Jerome. The community continued trying to break his relative silence; Jerome was sent to stay with Jean Nicola, a Corsican deserter and speaker of several languages. Nicola could not get him to talk, but Jerome stayed in the Nicola home for seven more years, becoming a favourite of the ladies of the household – Jean's wife Julitte and his stepdaughter Madeleine.

After the death of Julitte Nicola, her husband returned to Europe and Jerome went to stay with Dedier and Zabeth Comeau in Saint Alphonse de Clare, near Meteghan. The Comeaus used Jerome's relative fame to their advantage, charging admission fees to see the mystery man, living well on this and the government stipend. But Jerome did not seem to mind, and stayed there until his death on April 15, 1912. He was buried at Stella Maris Catholic Cemetery in Meteghan.

== Legacy and possible explanations ==
It has been suggested that Jerome was a sailor who may have attempted a mutiny, being punished by amputation. Another suggestion is that he could have been an heir to a fortune and was "gotten rid of" to make way for someone else seeking his inheritance.

It is possible that Jerome's difficulties with producing speech could be linked to a brain injury, most likely in Broca's area, the part of the brain that regulates speech. Jerome would have been incapable of speaking in any sort of understandable language. This may account for Jerome's ability to make animalistic noises, but not replicate human language.

Jerome has figured strongly in the popular imagination in Nova Scotia, and there have been several books written about the case. In 1994, director Phil Comeau released a feature film about Jerome, titled Jerome's Secret (Le secret de Jérôme). The film starred Denis Lapalme, a former Canadian Paralympic athlete, as Jerome. It received 15 awards worldwide.

In 2008, local historian Fraser Mooney Jr. of Yarmouth, Nova Scotia published a book entitled Jerome: Solving the Mystery of Nova Scotia's Silent Castaway. In this book, Mooney offers a solution to the man's mysterious origins. He reports that on the other side of the Bay of Fundy, in Chipman, New Brunswick, in 1859 (a few years before Jerome's appearance) a young foreigner was reported as having fallen through river ice. He developed gangrene in both legs due to the accident and they had to be amputated by a local doctor. Here he became known as "Gamby", probably because on wakening he kept calling for gamba, Italian for "leg". Gamby proved to be a burden for the people of Chipman, and it was rumoured that a passing schooner captain was paid to transport him away. The captain could possibly have just sailed to the opposite side of the bay to Nova Scotia, where he became Sandy Cove's problem. Mooney's account has been controversial. Notably, the writer Noah Richler has called the book speculative and a fiction. There are official government documents about Gamby, and several contemporary witnesses stated that Gamby and Jerome were the same person.
