= County of Yarmouth =

Canadian ship

History

Canada
- Name: County of Yarmouth
- Namesake: Yarmouth County, Nova Scotia
- Owner: William D. Lovitt
- Port of registry: Yarmouth, Nova Scotia
- Builder: Hilaire P. Boudreau, Belliveau's Cove, Nova Scotia
- Launched: May 29, 1884
- Identification: Code Letters JNHG
- Fate: Sold to Argentina as training ship, 1896

General characteristics
- Tonnage: 2154 Gross
- Length: 243 ft (74 m)
- Beam: 44.5 ft (13.6 m)
- Depth: 24 ft
- Decks: 2
- Propulsion: Sail
- Sail plan: Ship

County of Yarmouth was a full-rigged ship built in Belliveau's Cove, Nova Scotia, in 1884. She was the largest wooden ship ever built for shipowners in Yarmouth County, Nova Scotia, and the second largest wooden ship ever built in Canada, only a few tons less than the ship William D. Lawrence. The ship was one of a series of very large wooden ships proudly named after major shipbuilding counties of Nova Scotia at the end of the Age of Sail. William D. Lovitt, owner of a fleet of ships from Yarmouth, began as the sole owner. The ship enjoyed a profitable decade of service circling the globe several times but most often trading between South American, Canadian and British ports. She survived a serious grounding at Low Point, Cape Breton, in 1893. After being dismasted in December 1895, she was to be broken up at Grimsby, England, but was purchased by the government of Argentina as a school ship.
