= Salmon River, Digby County =

Community in Nova Scotia, Canada

Coordinates: 44°3′4.99″N 66°9′40.52″W

Salmon River in Nova Scotia

Salmon River (French: Rivière-aux-Saumons) is a community in the Canadian province of Nova Scotia, located in Digby County.

== History ==
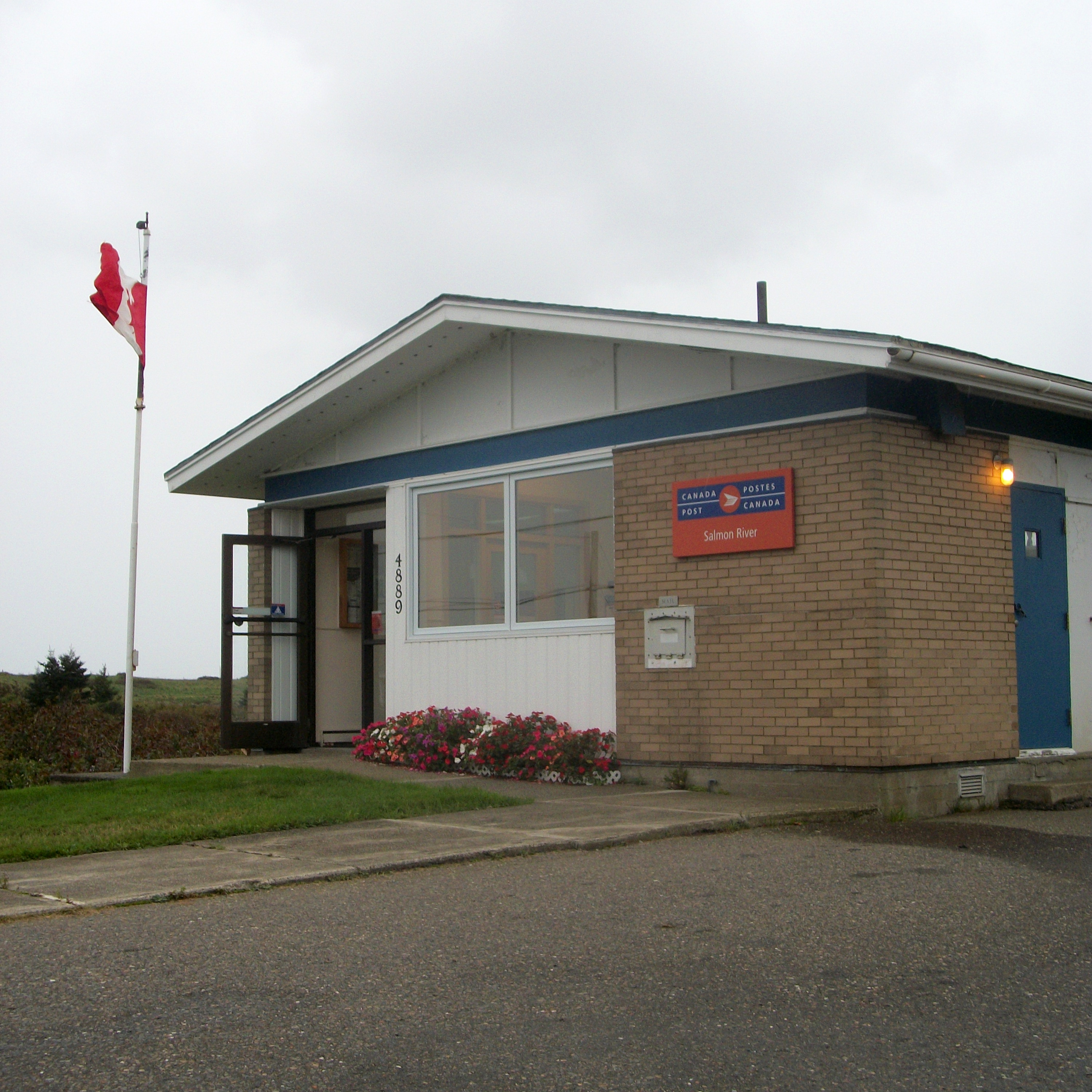
Salmon River post office

Jacques Deveau and his wife Marie-Madeleine Robichaud were the first Acadian settlers of the community, arriving in the spring of 1786. They returned to the province after the Expulsion of the Acadians in 1755. They were granted 200 acres in Salmon River through a series of land petitions and swaps with a Loyalist family.

== Education ==
The local school is École Saint-Albert from Grade Primary to Grade 6. Grades 7 to 12 are normally sent to nearby École secondaire de Clare.
