= Morganville, Nova Scotia =

Community in Nova Scotia, Canada

Coordinates: 44°31′56.09″N 65°37′32.88″W

Morganville in Nova Scotia

Morganville is a community in the Canadian province of Nova Scotia, located in the Municipality of the District of Digby in Digby County, southeast of the community of Bear River.
