= René Jacques Lévy =

French chemist (1875–1912)

- Born: 7 July, 1875; Nancy, France
- Died: 15 April 1912 (aged 36); Atlantic Ocean
- Cause of death: drowning
- Education: École nationale supérieure des industries chimiques
- Occupation: Chemist,
- Known for: being a victim of the Titanic

René Jacques Lévy (7 July 1875, in Nancy – 15 April 1912, in Atlantic Ocean) was a French chemist who died in the sinking of the Titanic. He was the author of several patents operated by the company Air Liquide.

In 1896, René Lévy graduated from École nationale supérieure des industries chimiques. In 1897, he moved to Manchester where he worked at the Clayton Aniline Company, of which his uncle Charles Dreyfus was director, and he invented, with André Helbronner in 1902, a process making it possible to produce liquid air industrially. The license is acquired by Air Liquide and he then joins the company and works in the office of Boulogne-sur-Seine.

In 1903, he married Jeanne Royer with whom he had three daughters, Simone in 1904, Andrée in 1906, and Yvette in 1909.

After having managed the British branch of Air Liquide in London, he was sent in 1910, to Canada by the president of the company Paul Delorme, to create and manage a subsidiary in the suburbs of Montréal.

In March 1912, he went to Paris to attend a funeral, planning to return to Canada on the France on 20 April, but he exchanged his ticket to go back ten days earlier on the Titanic.

The Royal Society of Chemistry honored him in 2012 on the occasion of the commemoration of the hundred years of the sinking of the Titanic.
