= Lighthouse Road, Nova Scotia =

Locality in Nova Scotia, Canada

Coordinates: 44°38′15.05″N 65°46′5.81″W

Lighthouse Road in Nova Scotia

Lighthouse Road is a locality in the Canadian province of Nova Scotia, located in The Municipality of the District of Digby in Digby County.
