= Maxwellton, Nova Scotia =

Community in Nova Scotia, Canada

Coordinates: 44°9′48.67″N 66°3′12.89″W

Maxwellton in Nova Scotia

Maxwellton is a community in the Canadian province of Nova Scotia, located in Digby County. The area is thought to be named for an early settler.
