= Centreville, Digby, Nova Scotia =

Community in Nova Scotia, Canada

Coordinates: 44°32′42.78″N 66°0′32.22″W

Centreville in Nova Scotia

Centreville is a community in the Canadian province of Nova Scotia, located in the Municipality of the District of Digby in Digby County on Digby Neck.
