= William Mintram =

British sailor on Titanic (1866–1912)

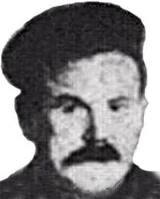
- Born: March 1866; Southampton, Hampshire, England
- Died: 15 April 1912 (aged 46); RMS Titanic, Atlantic Ocean
- Occupation: Fireman (Stoker)
- Spouse: Eliza Mary Rose Veal
- Children: Rosina May, William Jnr, Eliza May, Charles Thomas, George

William Mintram (March 1866 – 15 April 1912) was a fireman (stoker) on the RMS Titanic until it struck an iceberg on 14 April 1912. William worked for White Star Line after his release from prison for the murder of his wife.

== Married life ==
William married Eliza Mary Rose Veal on 16 August 1886 and went on to have five children with her, William Jnr, Charles, George, May and Rosina. Rosina was married to Walter Hurst who was also a fireman on the Titanic.

== Killing ==
Mintram did not have a happy marriage. On the evening of 18 October 1902, after a row when he complained over his wife's pawning of his son's boots to pay for drink, he stabbed her in the back and she died soon afterwards. Mintram appeared at Winchester Assizes the following month, charged with wilful murder; he gave evidence in his own defence, saying that he had been drunk and his wife had rushed at him, but he did not remember anything more. A policeman gave evidence saying that he had heard quarrelling in the house and had to disperse a crowd from outside, about half an hour before the attack. Mintram was said by his employers to have an excellent character. The jury returned a verdict of guilty of manslaughter and the judge sentenced him to penal servitude for 12 years. He served three before being released.

== Death ==
William died on the Titanic as one of its many victims. On the night of the sinking William had managed to find a lifejacket but his son-in-law Walter had not, so William gave him his. His actions contributed to Walter's survival. His body, if recovered, was never identified.
