= Smiths Cove, Nova Scotia =

Community in Nova Scotia, Canada

Coordinates: 44°36′26″N 65°43′29″W

Smiths Cove in Nova Scotia

Smiths Cove is a community in the Canadian province of Nova Scotia, located in the Municipality of the District of Digby in Digby County. It is one of several villages in the Annapolis Valley district of Nova Scotia.

Smiths Cove is a small community, named after Loyalist Joseph Smith, that overlooks the Annapolis Basin. It is a popular destination for tourists during the summer, with two large campgrounds and seven motels, inns and cottages. Smiths Cove has a number of beaches, and beach-combing is a favorite activity. The Look Off has views of the Annapolis Basin, Bear River and the Digby Gut. The Annapolis Valley Trail System, which follows the abandoned Dominion Atlantic Railway bed, is used by hikers, bikers and ATVers.

The Smiths Cove Old Temperance Hall Museum is located in the Old Meeting House on Highway 1 and has displays dating back to the 18th century. Nearby is the Smiths Cove War Memorial. The Smiths Cove Baptist Church and the Smiths Cove Fire Hall are active in the community and are located side by side on North Old Post Road.

== Events ==
The Smiths Cove Fire Department hosts fund-raisers, including the Scallywag Run, an 8-kilometer run/walk that usually takes place in late August. Runners and walkers follow the plank (a sandbar that is uncovered during low tide) that connects one of the many beaches of Smiths Cove with Bear Island.
