= Little River, Digby, Nova Scotia =

Community in Nova Scotia, Canada

Coordinates: 44°26′47.5″N 66°8′39.19″W

Little River in Nova Scotia

Little River is a community in the Canadian province of Nova Scotia, located in the Municipality of the District of Digby in Digby County. Little River is a small fishing community located roughly 25 kilometers from Digby. Little River houses roughly 200 citizens.
