= Bear Cove, Digby, Nova Scotia =

Locality in Nova Scotia, Canada

Coordinates: 44°7′57.9″N 66°10′37.3″W

Bear Cove in Nova Scotia

Bear Cove is a locality in the Canadian province of Nova Scotia, located in Digby County. The settlement was established in the late 18th century by Acadians.
