= Church Point, Nova Scotia =

Church Point Pointe-de-l'Église
- Community
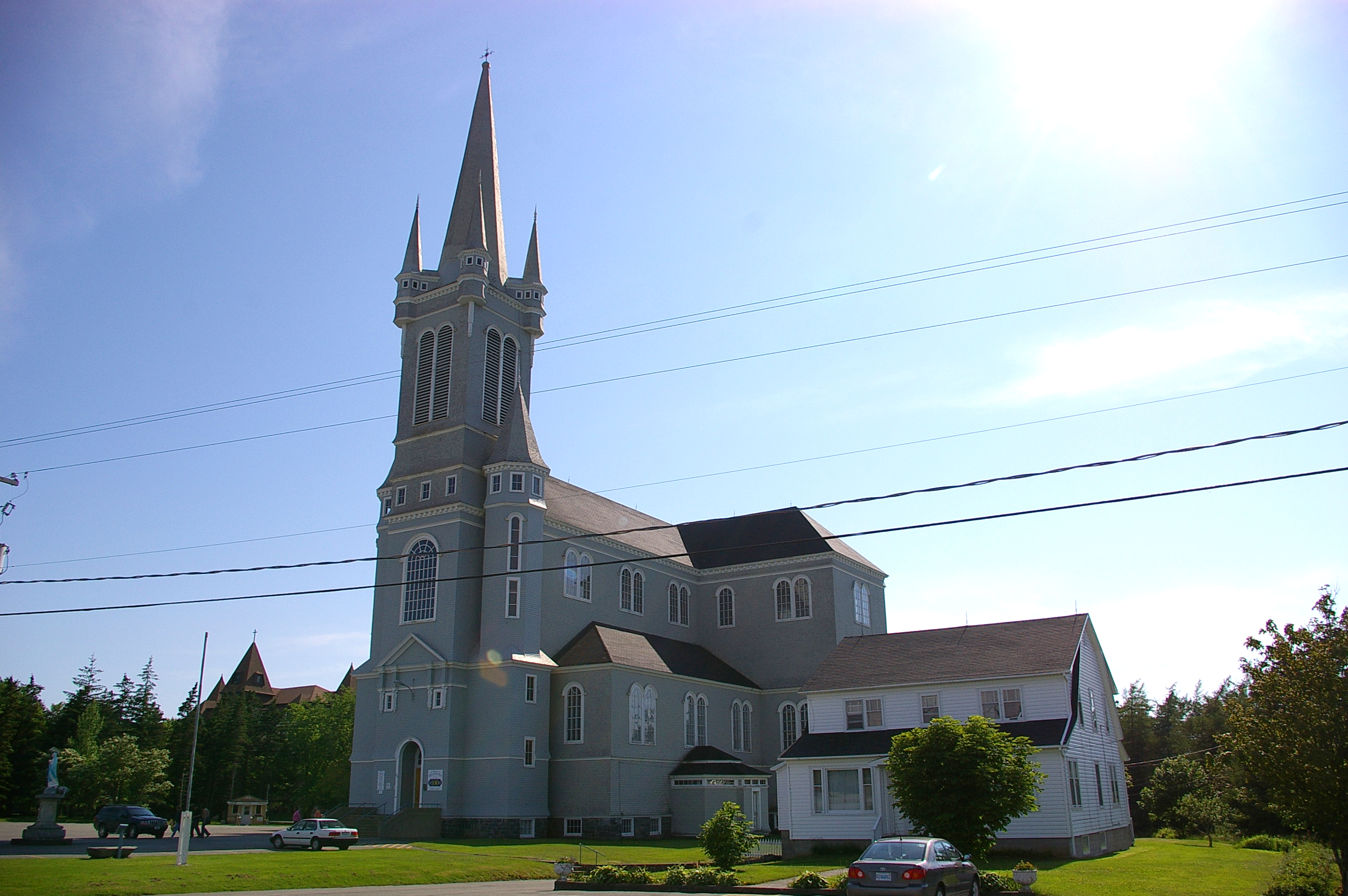
- Sainte-Marie's Church

- Location of Church Point, Nova Scotia
- Coordinates: 44°20′20″N 66°06′51″W
- Country: Canada
- Province: Nova Scotia
- County: Digby
- Founded: June 1783
- Incorporated: February 28, 1890
- Electoral Districts Federal: West Nova
- Provincial: Clare

Government
  - Type: Town Council
  - MLA: Wayne Gaudet (L)
  - MP: Chris d'Entremont (L)
- Elevation: 0–152 m (0–499 ft)
- Time zone: UTC-4 (AST)
  - Summer (DST): UTC-3 (ADT)
- Canadian Postal code: B0V 1A0
- Area code: 902
- Median Earnings*: 28,551
- Website: http://www.ChurchPoint.ns.ca
- Median household income, 2005 (all households)

Church Point (French: Pointe-de-l'Église) is an unincorporated community in the Canadian province of Nova Scotia, located on Saint Mary's Bay in the District of Clare in Digby County.

== History ==
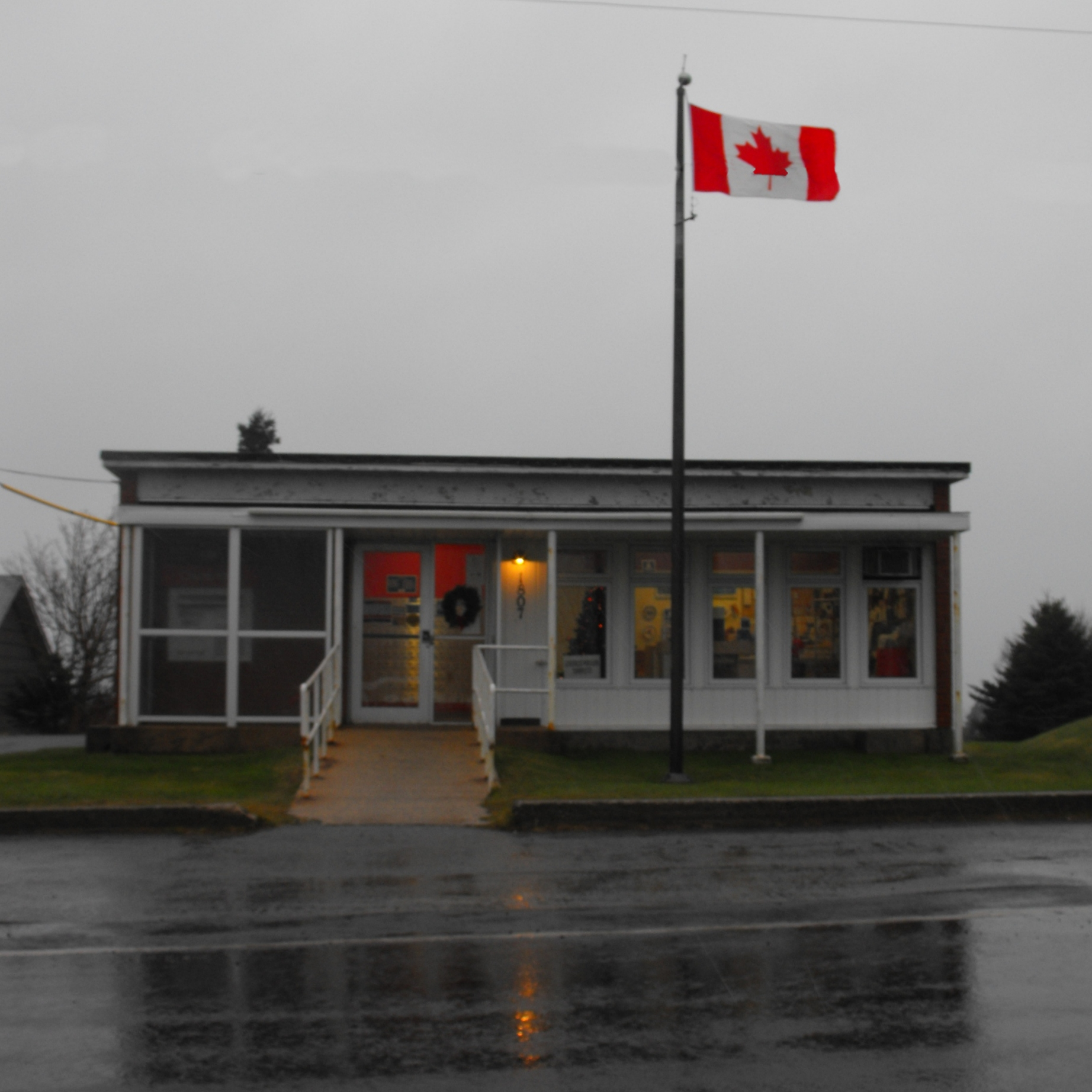
The post office in Church Point (Pointe-de-l'Église).

Church Point continues to constitute part of a thriving Acadian French linguistic presence in Nova Scotia. Today it is on the "Evangeline Trail."

=== Université Sainte-Anne ===
Church Point is home to Université Sainte-Anne, the only French language university in Nova Scotia. Approximately 500 students study there. It was founded on September 1, 1890, by Gustave Blanche, a Eudist Father. The university was named after Saint Anne, the mother of the Virgin Mary. Sainte-Anne is known for its French Immersion programs. The program is very strict about using immersion to learn the French language. At the official opening of the session, the student is asked to sign a pledge agreeing to speak French at all times during the program. As soon as the pledge is signed, the use of French is mandatory at all times. If a student is caught speaking English they will receive a warning. The third warning results in expulsion from the program, without a refund.

Also on the university campus houses the local arena and the home of the Clare Acadiens hockey association.

A Visitor Centre, housing an Acadian interpretive centre and visitor information, is located on the university campus. An Acadian Odyssey Monument commemorating the founding of Clare was erected in September 2015, and is situated in front of the Visitor Centre.

=== Sainte Marie Church ===
Church Point is also known for the tallest wooden church in North America, Sainte Marie Church (French: Église Sainte-Marie), which is located just north of the university. The Catholic Church Sainte-Marie was built from 1903 to 1905. Since 2000, the church is a registered museum.

=== Church Point Lighthouse ===
A Lighthouse was built in 1874 by G. S. Parker. It was a white wooden pepper-shaker-type tower standing 9.4 meters tall and topped by a red lantern room. The light was discontinued in 1984, while the dwelling was removed from the site sometime around 1953 when the light was electrified and made unwatched. The neglected Church Point Lighthouse was destroyed by a powerful spring storm in March 2014. A “replica” of the original lighthouse was built and opened to the public in 2017.
