= Josua Lindahl =

- Born: Johan Harald Josua Lindahl; January 1, 1844; Kungsbacka, Sweden
- Died: April 19, 1912; Chicago, Illinois
- Occupations: Geologist, paleontologist

Johan Harald Josua (Joshua) Lindahl (January 1, 1844 – April 19, 1912) was a Swedish American geologist and paleontologist. He was a professor at Augustana College from 1878 to 1888, then was Illinois State Geologist until 1893. He is the namesake of the extinct Cyprinidae subspecies Aphelichthys lindahlii. and the extinct Medullosales Neuropteris lindahli named by David White (geologist)

== Biography ==
Johan Harald Josua Lindahl was born in Kungsbacka, Halland County, Sweden. He was the son of a Lutheran minister. When his father died in 1854, he was sent to Karlshamn, Blekinge County, to live with relatives. Lindahl attended Lund University, graduating in 1863. He supported himself through tutorship of the noble Essen family. He studied with conchologist John Gwyn Jeffreys on his Atlantic Ocean deep sea surveys in 1870. The following year, Lindahl was part of an expedition to Greenland to retrieve natural blocks of iron. In 1872, he was named an assistant of the Royal Swedish Museum under Sven Ludvig Lovén. He received a Ph.D. in 1874, then was appointed a docent in zoology at Lund.

Lindahl was appointed the secretary of the Swedish commission to the International Geological Congress and Exposition in 1875. When he returned, he was given leadership of the Swedish delegation at the Centennial Exposition in Philadelphia, Pennsylvania. He remained in Philadelphia until 1878, when he accepted an appointment as the chair of natural science at Augustana College, Rock Island, Illinois. The first professor there who was not a minister, Lindahl also founded the school's museum of natural history.

In 1888, Lindahl was named Illinois State Geologist and curator of the Illinois State Museum. He served in this role until July 1893, when he was asked to resign by Governor John Peter Altgeld. Lindahl then moved to Chicago, where he taught for two years before his appointment as director of the Cincinnati Society of Natural History in Cincinnati, Ohio. He was the editor of their Journal of the Cincinnati Society of Natural History. He also became involved with the production of ethyl acetate, and returned to Chicago to oversee its manufacture.

Lindahl was a member of the American Association for the Advancement of Science, National Geographic Society, and the Swedish Society for Anthropology and Geography. He was also president of the Ohio State Academy of Science. He was named Officier d'Académie in Paris in 1875, and in 1877, King Oscar II of Sweden named him to the Order of Vasa.

== Personal life ==
He married Swedish native Sophie Pahlman (1848–1909) on March 18, 1877. They had four children, though the eldest died young. Lindahl died at his Chicago home in 1914.

== Publications ==
- Dr. N. O. Holst's Studies in Glacial Geology, The American Naturalist, 1888
- Description of a Skull of Megalonyx Leidyi, Transactions of the American Philosophical Society, 1892
- The Black-Capped Petrel (Æstrelata hasitata) on the Ohio River at Cincinnati, The Auk, 1899
- A List of Isopoda from the State of Ohio, Preserved in the Museum of the Cincinnati Society of Natural History, The Ohio Naturalist, 1906

== Patents ==
- Improvements in Planetographs or Zodiac Charts (with Caleb Lindahl), 1896
