= Hillgrove, Nova Scotia =

Community in Nova Scotia, Canada

Coordinates: 44°33′36.51″N 65°46′28.06″W

Hillgrove in Nova Scotia

Hillgrove is a community in the Canadian province of Nova Scotia, located in The Municipality of the District of Digby in Digby County.
