= Cliché Hot =

Studio album by Radio Radio
- Released: May 13, 2008
- Genre: Canadian hip hop
- Length: 46:10
- Label: Bonsound Records

Radio Radio chronology
Télé Télé (2007)	Cliché Hot (2008)	Belmundo Regal (2010)

Cliché Hot is the first studio album by Canadian hip hop group Radio Radio. The album was nominated for the Félix Award for best hip hop album and the band was nominated for revelation of the year. The album was also the basis of Radio Radio's nomination for a Prix Éloizes in 2010.

The song "Jacuzzi" was particularly popular in Quebec and the video was also nominated for a Félix Award in 2009. It is included in the ice hockey video game NHL 2K11.

== Track listing ==
No.	Title	Length
1.	"Forme Elliptique"	3:31
2.	"Rum Runner"	3:12
3.	"Cliché Hot"	3:46
4.	"Jacuzzi"	3:04
5.	"Vuca Vuca"	4:19
6.	"On représente"	4:05
7.	"Lève tes mains"	4:42
8.	"Bingo"	4:46
9.	"Radio au carré"	5:44
10.	"Baisse les lights"	4:16
11.	"Jacuzzi after party"	4:52
