= Woodvale, Nova Scotia =

Community in Nova Scotia, Canada

Coordinates: 44°14′11.73″N 66°6′17.05″W

Woodvale in Nova Scotia

Woodvale is a community in the Canadian province of Nova Scotia, located in Digby County. Formerly known as Brookville, the community was established by Lemuel Bartlett around 1799. A postal way office opened in Woodvale in 1861, and a church was built there around 1870. The area had a population of 68 people in 1956.
