= Otto Stichling =

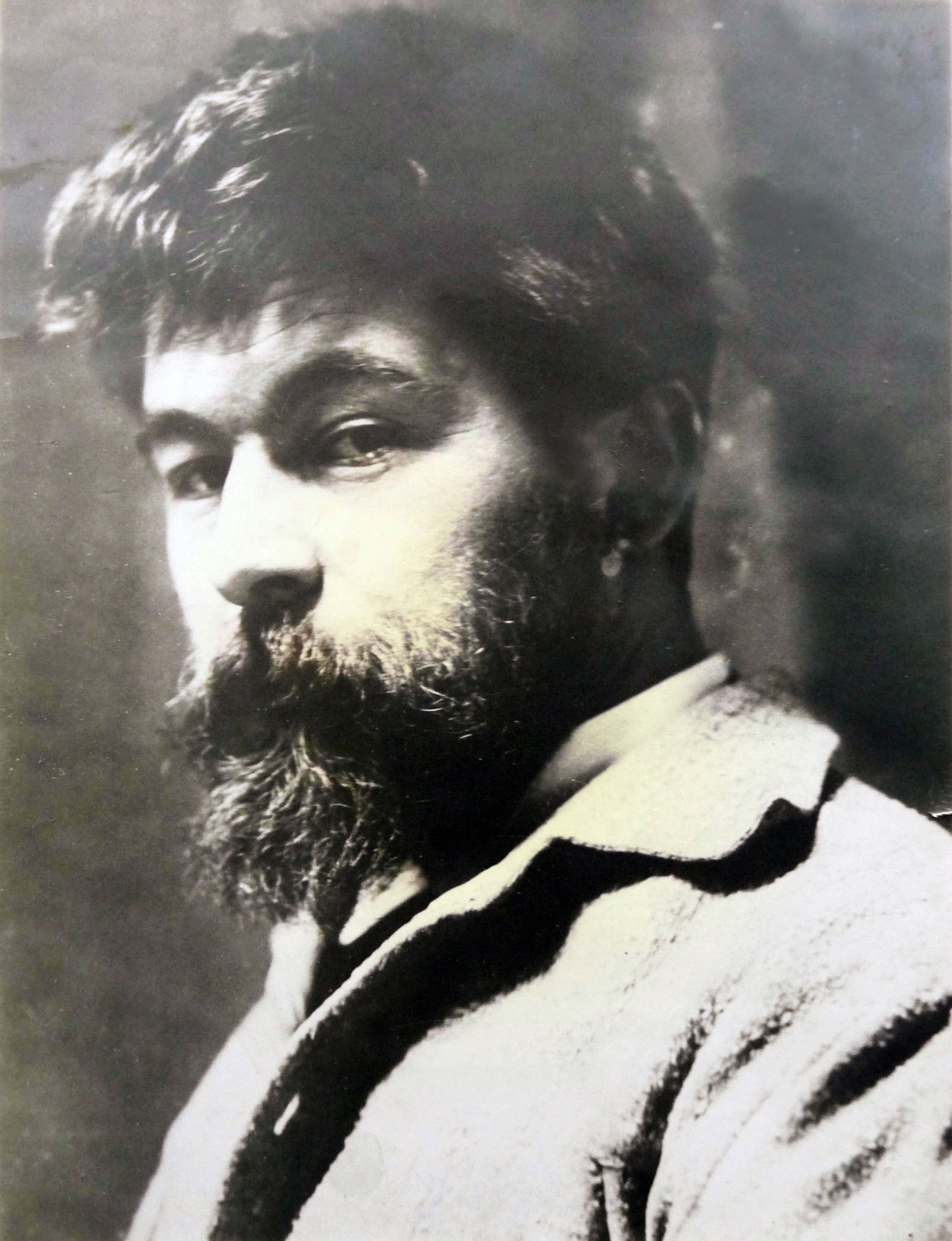
Otto Stichling (c.1910)

Otto Stichling (10 April 1866, Ohrdruf - 28 April 1912, Berlin) was a German sculptor in the Art Nouveau style.

== Biography ==
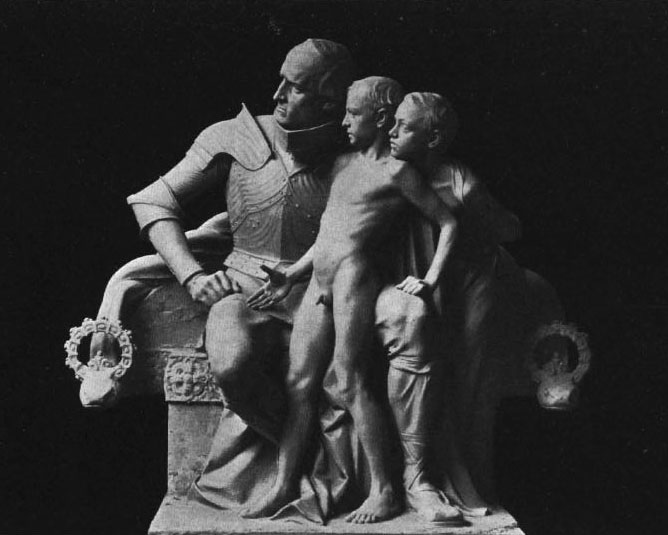
Copper fountain figures

He was the illegitimate son of Auguste Wilhelmine Rosalie Stichling, the daughter of a shoemaker, who was still underage. His father has never been identified. In 1868, she married a tailor named Wilhelm Bernhard Frommann. By legal declaration, Otto retained the name Stichling. After completing his primary education, he served an apprenticeship as a porcelain painter at Kestner & Co.; known for their porcelain dolls. During this time, his talents came to the attention of Duke Ernst II, who provided him with a scholarship to study in Berlin. From 1886 to 1893, he studied at the Academy of Arts with Fritz Schaper and Ernst Herter, while working as an assistant in several sculpture studios, to pay his living expenses.

His first major project came in 1890, when he won a competition to design colossal figures for the Staatstheater Wiesbaden. He and Fritz Klimsch collaborated on a design for the "Kriegswissenschaft" (Science of War) figure. In 1900, he designed and modelled several bronze statues, wood panels, and majolica sculptures for Pallenberg Hall, at the Kunstgewerbemuseum in Cologne. From 1901 to 1902, he created window reliefs for a house owned by the toy manufacturer, Ernst Paul Lehmann. This was part of a renovation overseen by the architect, Bruno Möhring, with whom Stichling would collaborate on several other projects. In 1904, he was awarded a gold medal at the Louisiana Purchase Exposition, for two groups of copper fountain figures, which were purchased by an anonymous American.

After 1907, he was based in Hamburg. There, at the invitation of Hermann Muthesius. he worked as a teacher at the Altona arts and crafts school, and was one of the founders of the Altonaer Künstlerverein (artists' association). He continued to work as a sculptor as well, creating sandstone statues of Martin Luther and Copernicus for the entrance at the new Oberrealschule.

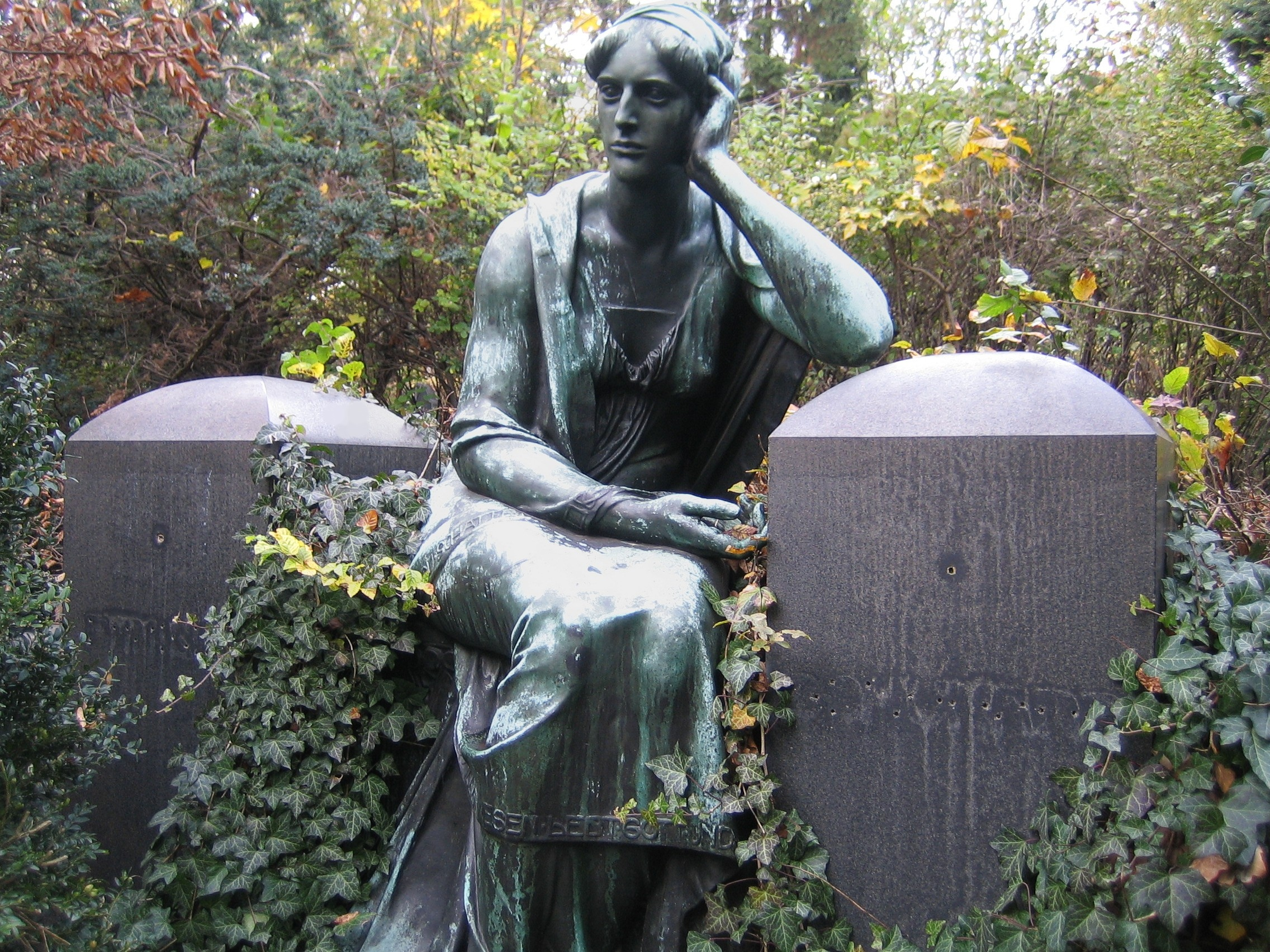
"Mourning", one of his numerous grave figures

He returned to Berlin in 1910, to teach at the instructional annex of the Arts and Crafts Museum. In 1911, he had a serious fainting spell while completing work on the interior of the ocean liner, SS Cap Finisterre, in Hamburg. This curtailed his teaching activities. A second severe attack left him unable to do any sculpting. He died, aged forty-six, of a heart attack, at a sanitarium in Berlin.
