= William Robertson (Canterbury cricketer) =

New Zealand cricketer

Personal information
- Born: 4 March 1864; Invercargill, New Zealand
- Died: 5 April 1912 (aged 48); Auckland, New Zealand
- Nickname: Pro
- Bowling: Right-arm off-spin

International information
- National side: New Zealand

Domestic team information
- Years: Team
- 1893-94 to 1900-01: Canterbury

Career statistics
Competition	First-class
Matches	12
Runs scored	68
Batting average	7.55
100s/50s	0/0
Top score	15
Balls bowled	2880
Wickets	85
Bowling average	14.44
5 wickets in innings	10
10 wickets in match	4
Best bowling	9/98
Catches/stumpings	5/0
- Source: Cricinfo, 24 September 2014

William Robertson (4 March 1864 – 5 April 1912) was a New Zealand cricketer who played first-class cricket for Canterbury from 1894 to 1901 and played in New Zealand's first representative matches.

== Cricket career ==
An off-spinner who opened the bowling, on his first-class debut for Canterbury against Auckland in January 1894 Robertson took 8 for 59 then, bowling unchanged throughout the second innings, 6 for 48. In his next match he took 6 for 72 (unchanged again) and 2 for 72. Selected for New Zealand's first representative match in February 1894, he was New Zealand's outstanding player, taking 6 for 76 and 4 for 73 in a 160-run loss to New South Wales. He then took seven wickets against Otago and eight against Hawke's Bay to give him 47 wickets in five matches at an average of 12.12. He was New Zealand's leading wicket-taker for the season.

After taking only one wicket in the first match in 1894-95, he then took 4 for 65 and 9 for 98 against Wellington, 6 for 54 and 5 for 40 against Fiji, and four wickets against Otago, to finish with 29 wickets at 14.00. He was New Zealand's joint leading wicket-taker for the season.

He played only one match in 1895-96, for New Zealand against New South Wales, when he took three wickets and made his highest score, 15, in a tenth-wicket partnership of 67 with Arthur Fisher that gave New Zealand a sufficient lead to enable them to go on to their first victory. After a gap of five years he returned to the Canterbury side in 1900-01 for his final two matches, and took six wickets.

Dick Brittenden said of Robertson: "He spun the ball either way a prodigious amount ... Small and slender, he suffered much ill-health, and asthma ended a brilliant career cruelly early." An accident in his youth had resulted in the loss of two fingers of his left hand.

Often known as "Billy" or "Pro", Robertson was also a successful cricket coach.
