= Belliveau Cove =

Community in Nova Scotia, Canada

Coordinates: 44°22′48.68″N 66°4′9.75″W

Belliveau Cove in Nova Scotia

Belliveau Cove (Canadian French: Anse-des-Belliveau) is a historical Acadian community in the Canadian province of Nova Scotia, located in the District of Clare in Digby County settled in 1768 on un-ceded Mi'kmaq territory. A major centre of wooden shipbuilding in the 19th and early 20th century, Belliveau Cove built the second largest wooden ship ever constructed in Canada, the County of Yarmouth in 1884. It is now a mixed community of citizens with diverse backgrounds, including Acadians.

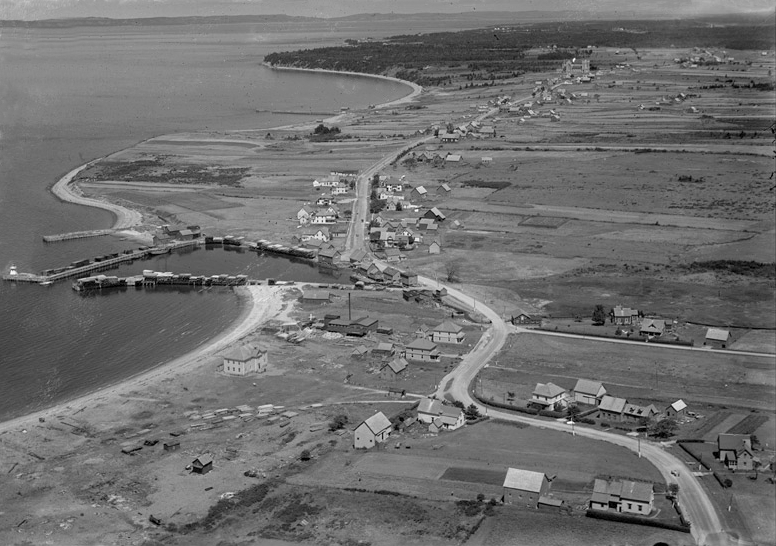
Belliveau Cove, 1931

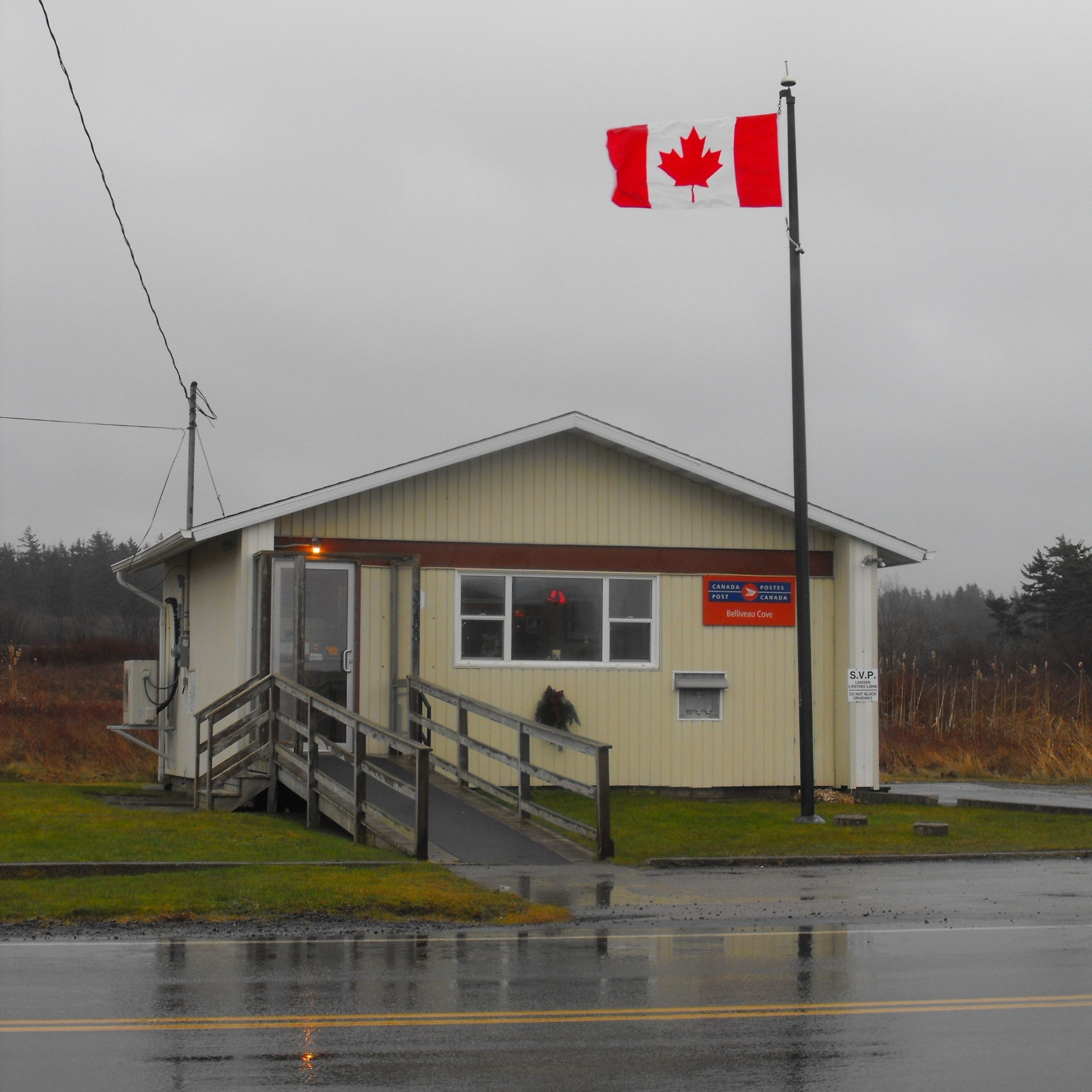
Belliveau Cove Post Office

Belliveau Cove was established in 1768 and is located on the west coast of the Nova Scotia peninsula on the St. Mary's Bay. Like many of the small Nova Scotia coastal port villages, Belliveau Cove was known for their wooden shipbuilding, shipping industry, and attendant services. All of the Belliveau family ships were built on the beaches just north of the north wharf along with ships for the Theriault family and other interests.

The wooden pepper-shaker-style lighthouse on end of the north wharf was established in 1889 and existed until 1973; its foundation had much deterioration and a storm caused the lighthouse to fall in the ocean. A replica lighthouse was built at the same location in the 1980s by the community and is maintained as a private navigational aid. The harbor is still used today by a small number of pleasure craft and small fishing boats. Due to the high tides, the harbor can only be used for 4 to 6 hours at a time on the rising and falling tides.

Situated in the bay of St. Mary's, the village experiences the majestic Bay of Fundy tides that have an amazing 28 foot range. When the tide is out, Belliveau's Cove is a popular clamming area.

The Joseph and Marie Dugas Municipal Park, named after the first Acadian couple to arrive in the area in 1768, has a wharf, lighthouse, and a 5 km nature trail bordering the shoreline and freshwater wetlands. At Major's Point, the first Acadian cemetery dating from 1755 and The Little Chapel or "La petite chapelle" can be visited. Also at Major's Point, remnants have been found of an Indigenous garden, and a sitting area where they waited for the tides to turn.

The village also has a summer Farmer's Market every Saturday between 10 am and 2 pm from May to September at the Joseph and Marie Dugas Municipal Park. The municipal park hosts the Beaux Vendredis supper on Friday nights. This music celebration features fresh lobster, clams, and crab, as well as local Acadian music. Through Tide Kite, the beach at the wharf has also become an attractive spot to fly kites.
