= Edward Gabbett =

Anglican priest

Edward Gabbett (14 January 1841 – 16 April 1912) was an Anglican priest in Ireland in the second half of the 19th Century and the first decade of the 20th.

Gabbett was born in County Dublin, and educated at Trinity College, Dublin. After a curacy at Kilmore he held incumbencies at Loughgall and Bruree. He was Treasurer of Limerick Cathedral from 1883 to 1891; Chancellor of Limerick from 1891 to 1904; and Archdeacon of Limerick from 1904 until his death.
