= William G. Hills =

American Civil War Medal of Honor recipient (1841–1912)

William Giles Hills
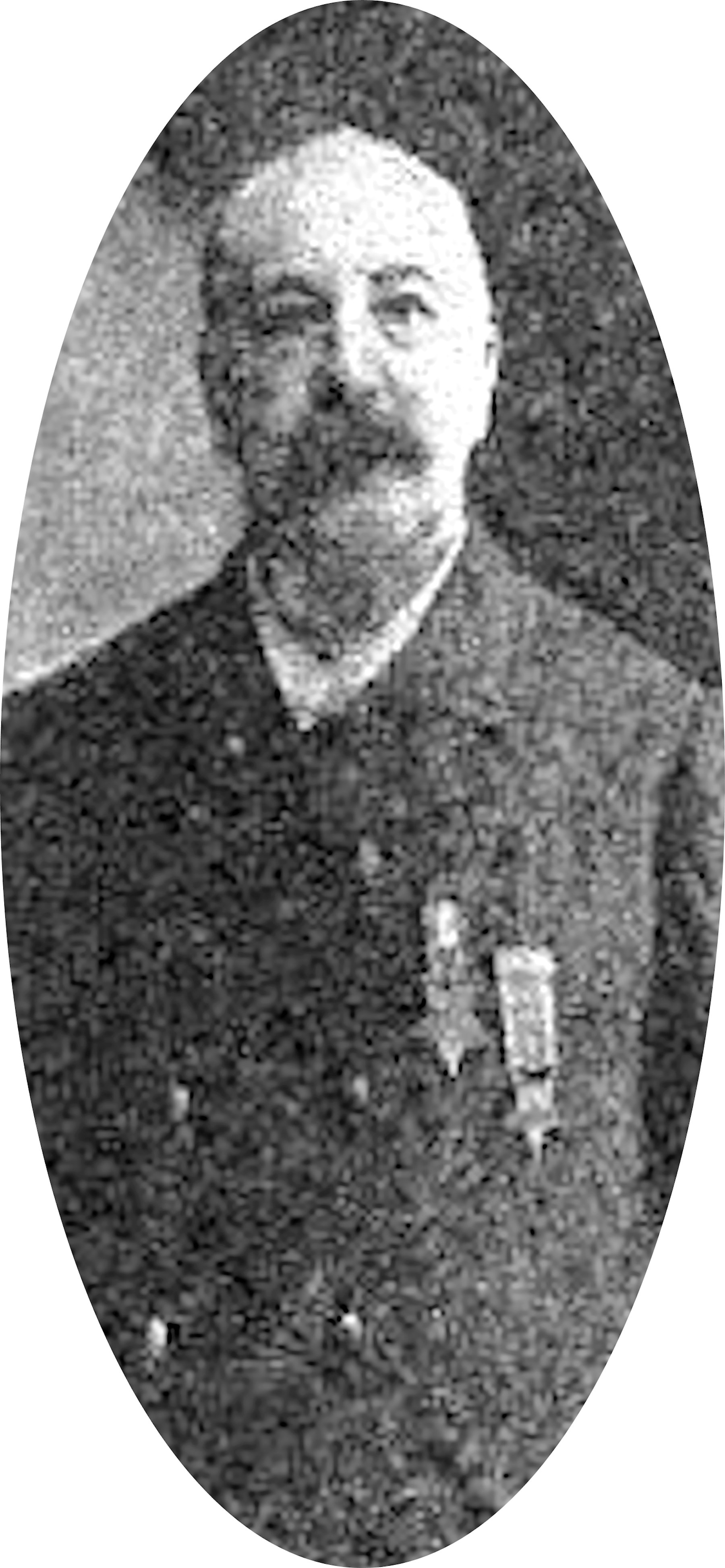
- Born: June 26, 1841; Conewango, New York, US
- Died: April 18, 1912 (aged 70); Saint Louis, Missouri, US
- Military career
- Allegiance: United States; Union
- Branch: United States Army; Union Army
- Rank: Private
- Units: Company E, 9th New York Volunteer Cavalry Regiment
- Conflicts: American Civil War
- Awards: Medal of Honor

William Giles Hills (June 26, 1841 – April 18, 1912) was a soldier in the United States Army during the American Civil War. He received the Medal of Honor.

== Biography ==
Hills was born on 26 Jun 1841 in Conewango, New York.

Hills was a Private with Company E, 9th New York Cavalry. He earned the Medal of Honor during the Civil War for heroism on September 26, 1864, at North Fork, Virginia.

== Medal of Honor citation ==
Rank and organization: Private, Company E, 9th New York Volunteer Cavalry Regiment. Place and date: At North Fork, Va., September 26, 1864.

Citation:

Voluntarily carried a severely wounded comrade out of a heavy fire of the enemy.

== See also ==
- List of Medal of Honor recipients
- List of American Civil War Medal of Honor recipients: G–L
