= École secondaire de Clare =

High school in Nova Scotia, Canada

Coordinates: 44.225894°N 66.131038°W

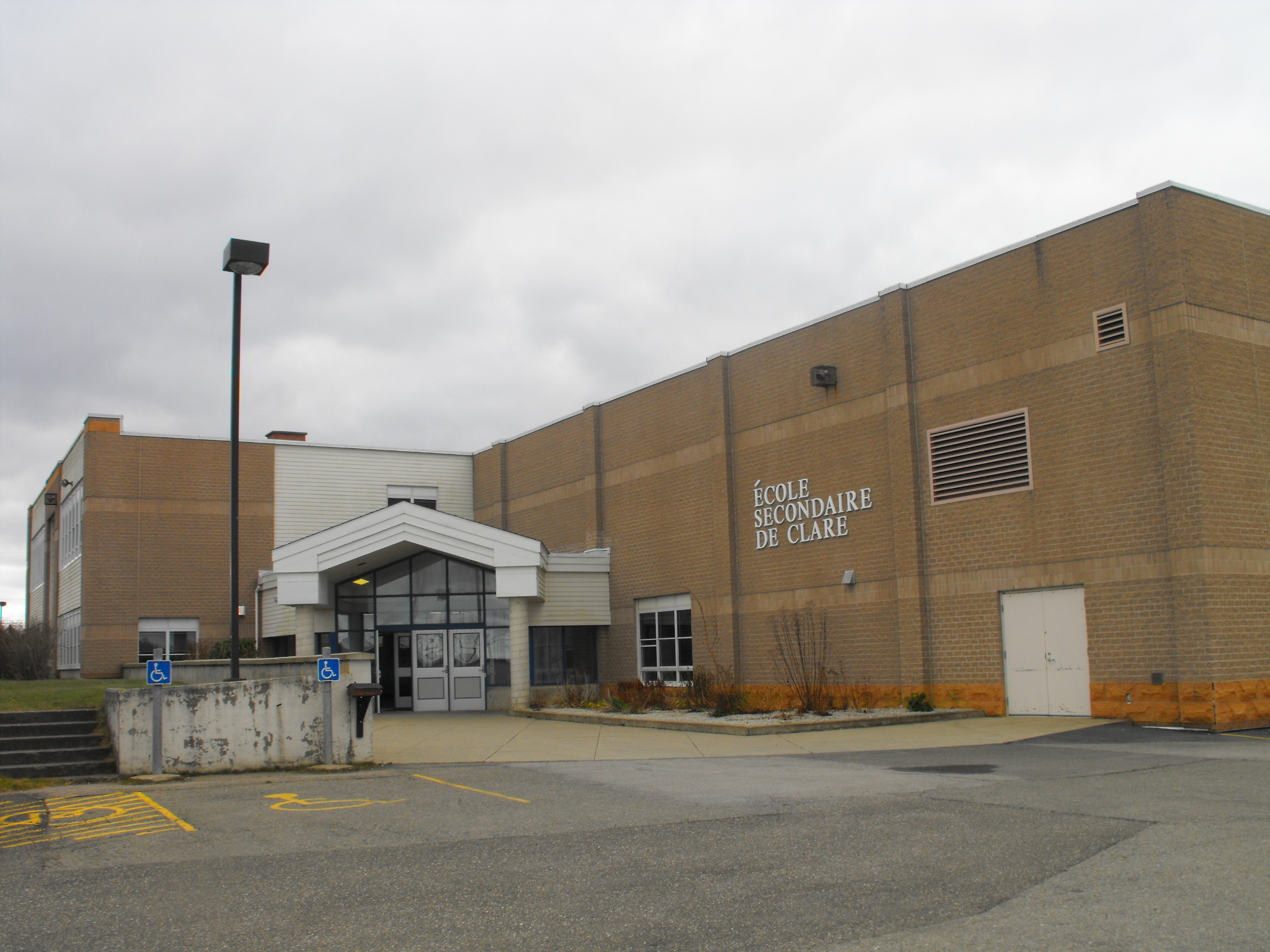
- École secondaire de Clare in 2012

Location
- 80 Placide Comeau Road; Meteghan River, Nova Scotia; Canada

Information
- Type: High School
- Motto: Pleines voiles vers l'avenir (Full Steam Ahead)
- Established: 1957
- Principal: Marc Poirier
- Grades: 7-12
- Enrollment: 350 Estimated
- Mascot: Wolf
- Website: esdc.ednet.ns.ca

École secondaire de Clare, formerly Clare District High School, is a French high school located in Meteghan River, Digby County in the Canadian province of Nova Scotia. As of September 2012, the school comprises grades 7 to 12. The school is in the Conseil scolaire acadien provincial school board.

== History ==
École secondaire de Clare opened in September 1957, with a total of 207 students in its first year.

In 1967, the school was closed temporarily due to an outbreak of tuberculosis.

Students at the school were able to study in French or English, or a blend of the two languages. In June 2000, the Nova Scotia Supreme Court ruled that students were entitled to education in their native language, and French and English students at the school were subsequently separated into two schools in the same building. Following this, the education minister Jane Purves ordered that all English books in the French school be transferred to the English school, and English students were barred from the French library. The Department of Education planned to construct a new school in St. Bernard for English students.
