= Briar Lake, Nova Scotia =

Community in Nova Scotia, Canada

Coordinates: 44°8′3.03″N 65°58′23.68″W

Briar Lake in Nova Scotia

Briar Lake is a community in the Canadian province of Nova Scotia, located in Digby County. The area is likely named after the briar plant, which grows plentifully there. Among the early settlers of Briar Lake were Charles and Samuel Leiboo.
