= A. V. Ragsdale =

American politician

Member of the Washington House of Representatives for the 3rd district
- In office 1891–1893

Personal details
- Born: December 14, 1854 Lucas County, Iowa, U.S.
- Died: April 3, 1912 (aged 57) Greenacres, Washington, U.S.
- Party: Republican
- Occupation: real estate broker

Amos Vincent Ragsdale (December 14, 1854 – April 3, 1912) was an American politician in the state of Washington. He served in the Washington House of Representatives from 1891 to 1893, representing Spokane County. Ragsdale was born in the village of Ragsdale in Lucas County, Iowa on December 14, 1854, and became a real estate broker and dealer after moving to Spokane around 1885. He was a member of the Republican party.
