= Cape St. Marys, Nova Scotia =

Harbor community in Nova Scotia

Coordinates: 44°5′28.18″N 66°11′49.22″W

Cape St. Marys in Nova Scotia

Cape St. Marys (French: Cap-Sainte-Marie) is a community in the Canadian province of Nova Scotia, located in the District of Clare in Digby County. The harbor is home to a number of fisheries that, as of 2015, were worth more than $5,000,000 annually. The harbour serves as homeport to a fleet of 42 fish harvesters and 14 fishing vessels. As many as nine transient ships spend time operating from the harbour, as well.

In 2014 a hydrographic survey was conducted by the Fisheries and Oceans Canada and found that the harbor was in need of major dredging to protect the local fleet. Cape St. Marys is scheduled for a major capital construction project that will improve the harbor by adding a new breakwater and groyne extension.
