= Saint Alphonse de Clare =

Community in Nova Scotia, Canada

Coordinates: 44°7′22.22″N 66°10′38.46″W

St. Alphonse de Clare in Nova Scotia

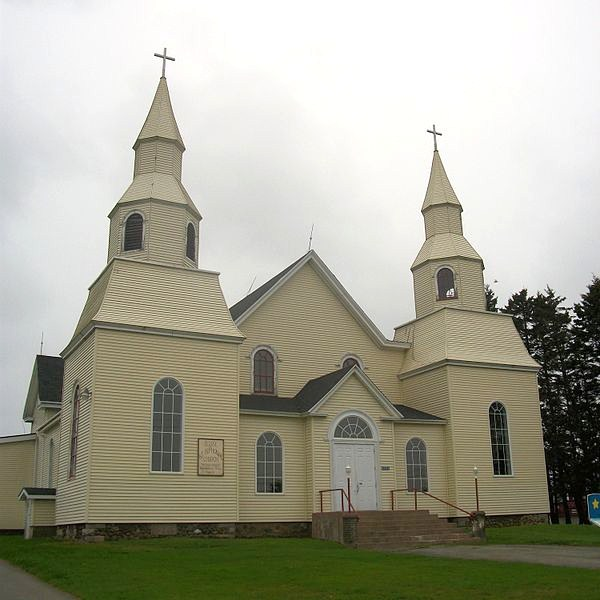
Saint-Alphonse de Clare Church

Saint Alphonse de Clare is an Acadian community in the Canadian province of Nova Scotia, located in the District of Clare in Digby County. Formerly Chéticamp-de-Clare, the name was changed because there is another Chéticamp in Nova Scotia on Cape Breton. The similar names caused confusion for postal and other services.

June Deveau Gallerie Studio was located in Saint Alphonse.
