= Little Brook, Nova Scotia =

Community in Nova Scotia, Canada

Coordinates: 44°18′7.14″N 66°7′16.69″W

Little Brook in Nova Scotia

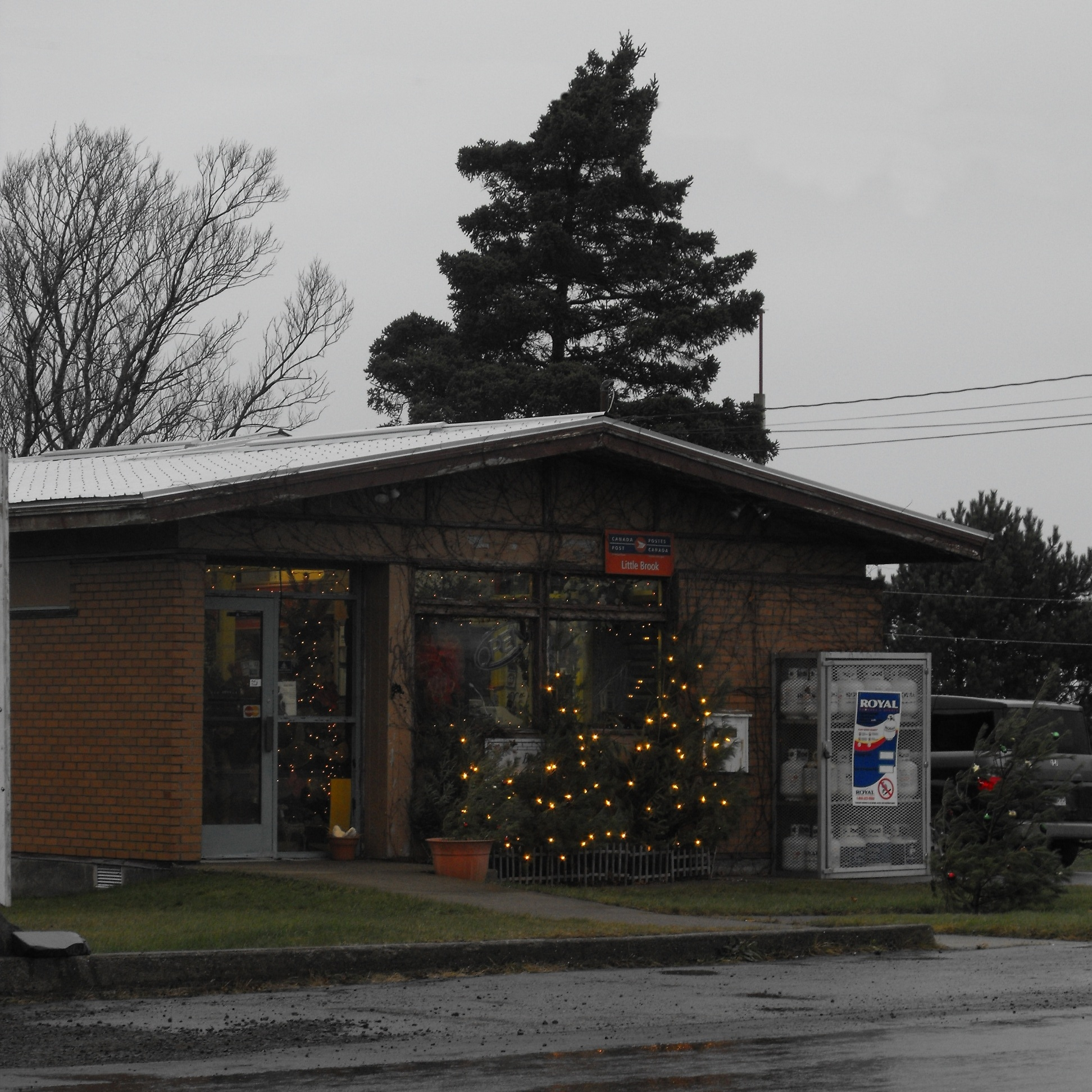
The former Little Brook post office is now privately run

Little Brook is a community in the Canadian province of Nova Scotia, located in the Clare Municipal District in Digby County. The area was settled by Acadians in 1770 and 1780. The District of Clare municipal offices are located in Little Brook, as is the Clare Golf and Country Club.

The village has a postmaster, but no official post office, which closed in 1988. Postal service is still provided from the former post office building, in addition to the sale of general merchandise.
