= Saulnierville =

Community in Nova Scotia, Canada

Coordinates: 44°15′57″N 66°07′50″W

Saulnierville in Nova Scotia

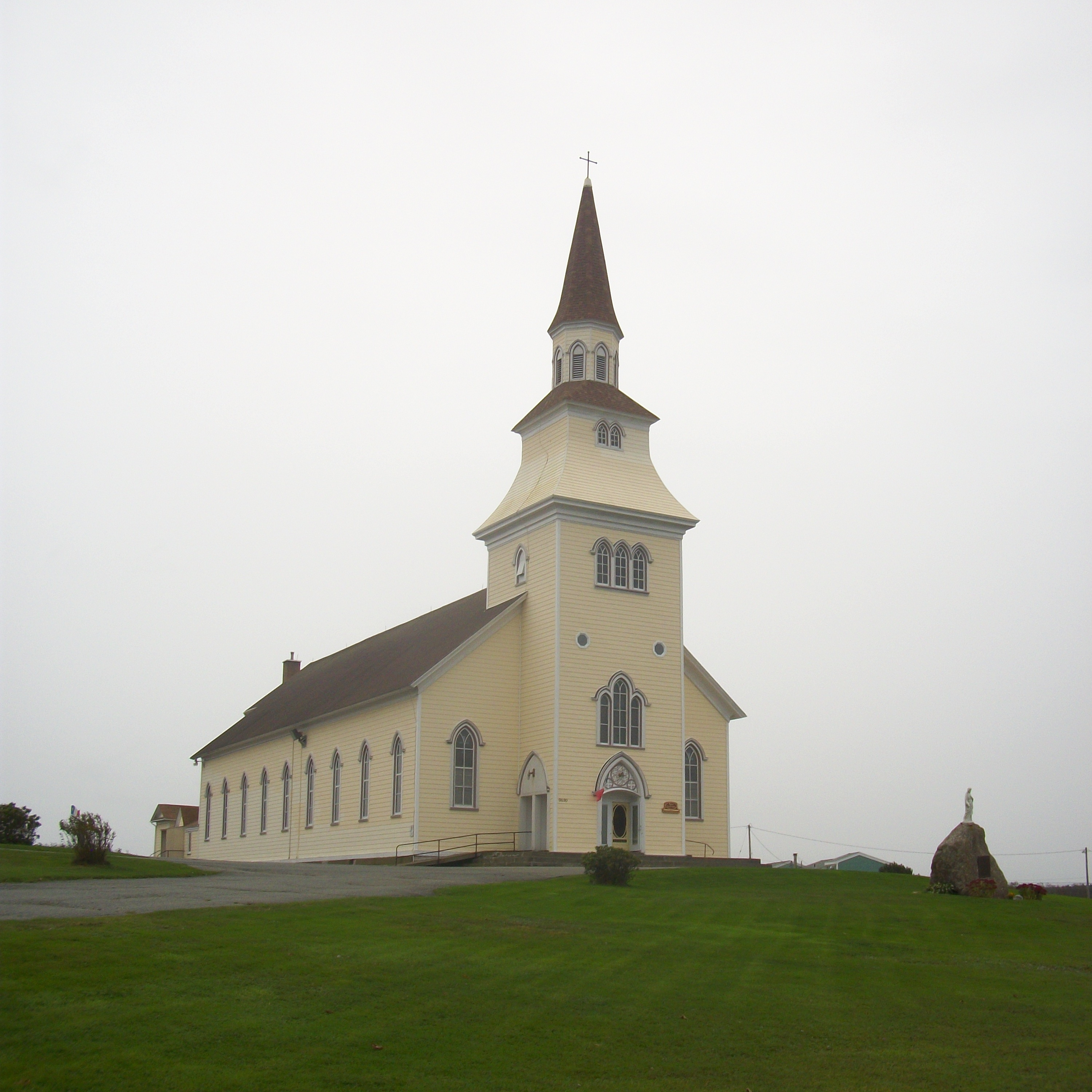
Sacré Cœur (Sacred Heart) Church

Saulnierville is a rural Acadian fishing community founded in 1785, located in Nova Scotia, Canada. It contains the French Shore's largest fish processing plant, Comeau Sea Foods, which has been in operations since 1946. Saulnierville also has one of the oldest churches in the region, Sacré Cœur (Sacred Heart) Church, built in 1880. The Clare Municipality Veterans Centre in Saulnierville is the starting point of the Gran Fondo Baie Sainte-Marie, a mass-start cycling ride in late September. It is located in Digby County.

In 2020, the community was the centre of a lobster fishing dispute between Mi'kmaq and non-indigenous fishers.
