= Comeauville =

Community in Nova Scotia, Canada

Coordinates: 44°17′0″N 66°7′59″W

Comeauville in Nova Scotia

Comeauville is a community in the Canadian province of Nova Scotia, located in Digby County. Formerly known as Clare, the community is named after Augustine F. Comeau, who established a postal way office here in 1841. A schoolhouse was erected in Comeauville in 1866, followed by a second schoolhouse in 1922.

In 1956, Comeauville had a population of 276 people.
