= Culloden, Nova Scotia =

Community in Nova Scotia, Canada

Coordinates: 44°38′54.62″N 65°50′56.26″W

Culloden in Nova Scotia

Culloden is a small community in the Canadian province of Nova Scotia, located in the Municipality of the District of Digby in Digby County.

== Etymology ==
Culloden the community is named after a ship that wrecked on the coastline in 1859. The ship was named after the Battle of Culloden, a battle near Inverness in Scotland in 1746, where many Scots were massacred by the British.
