= Sandy Cove, Digby, Nova Scotia =

Community in Nova Scotia, Canada

Coordinates: 44°29′24.5″N 66°5′11.54″W

Sandy Cove in Nova Scotia

Sandy Cove is a community in the Canadian province of Nova Scotia, located in the Municipality of the District of Digby in Digby County. The community is the birthplace of Laurence Bradford Dakin, and a common scene in the paintings of Maud Lewis.

== See also ==
- Jerome of Sandy Cove
