= List of members of the Canadian House of Commons with military service (V) =

Name	Elected party	Constituency	Elected date	Military service
William Berrian Vail	Liberal	Digby	October 26, 1874	Militia
Charles Van Horne	Progressive Conservative	Restigouche—Madawaska	September 26, 1955	Canadian Army
Harry Verran	Liberal	South West Nova	October 25, 1993	Royal Canadian Navy
Fernand Viau	Liberal	Saint Boniface	June 11, 1945	Canadian Army
Thomas Vien	Liberal	Lotbinière	December 17, 1917	Canadian Army (1919-1926)
Clément Vincent	Progressive Conservative	Nicolet—Yamaska	June 18, 1962	Canadian Army Cadet Corps
