= Labour Day (Canada) =

Public holiday in Canada celebrating the achievements of workers

Labour Day Fête du Travail
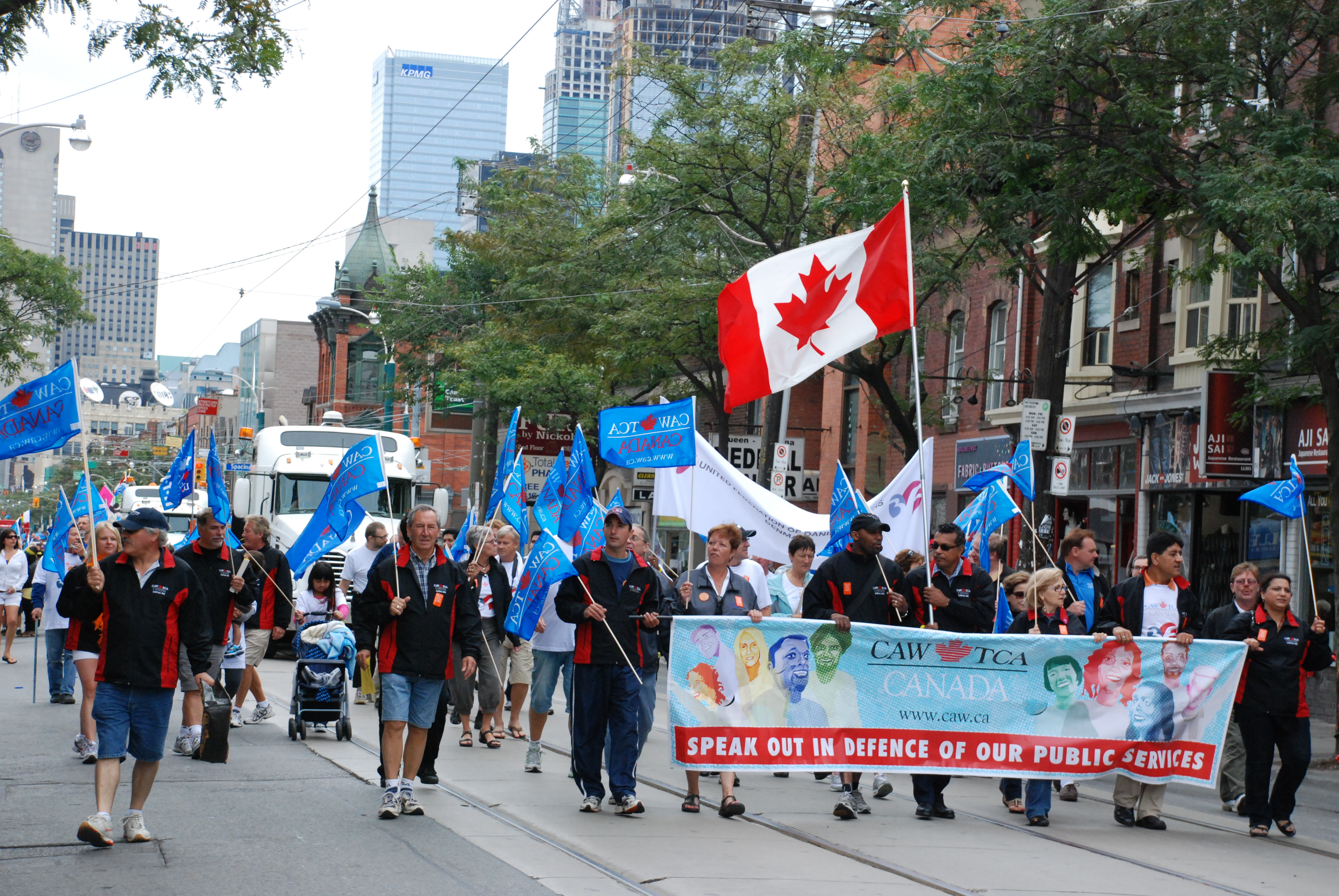
- A Labour Day parade in Toronto, Ontario, in 2011
- Observed by: Canada
- Type: Public
- Date: First Monday in September
- 2025 date: September 1
- 2026 date: September 7
- 2027 date: September 6
- 2028 date: September 4
- Frequency: Annual
- First time: 1894; 132 years ago
- Related to: Labor Day (US); Labour Day (worldwide)

Labour Day (French: fête du Travail) is a statutory public holiday in Canada that occurs on the first Monday in September. It is one of several Labour Day celebrations that occur in countries around the world. The Canadian celebration of Labour Day occurs on the same day as Labor Day in the United States.

== History ==
Labour Day has been marked as a statutory public holiday in Canada on the first Monday in September since 1894. However, the origins of Labour Day in Canada can be traced back to numerous local demonstrations and celebrations in earlier decades. Such events assumed political significance in 1872, when an April 15 labour demonstration in Toronto, in support of Toronto Typographical Union striking printers, led directly to the enactment of the Trade Unions Act, a law that confirmed the legality of unions.

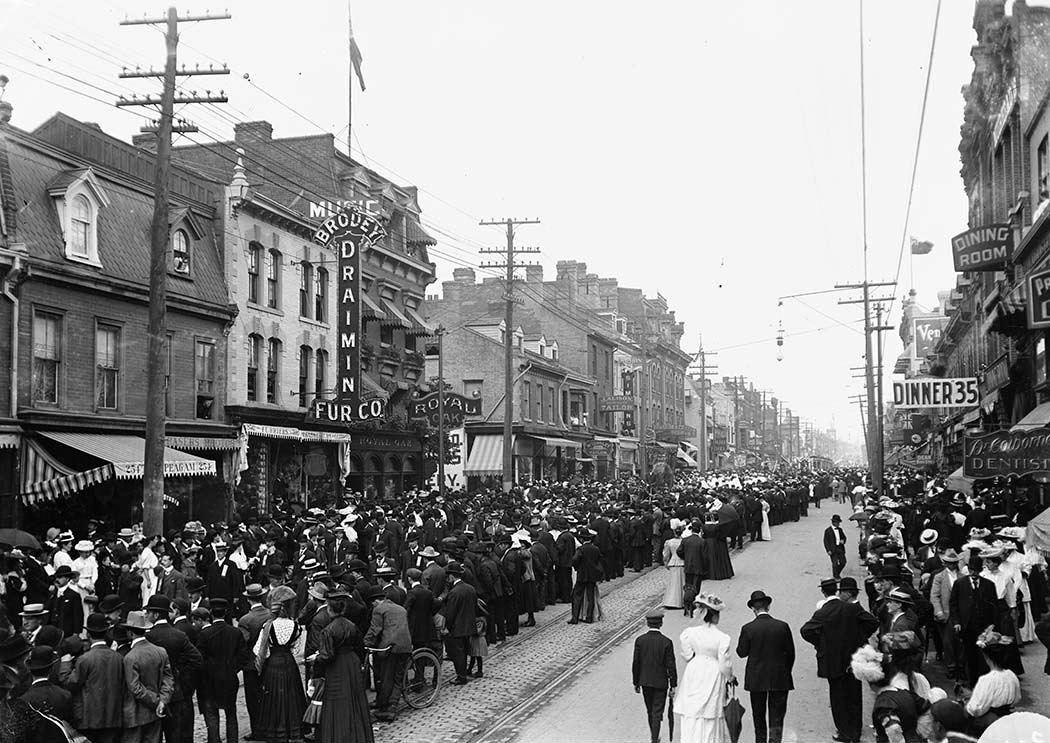
A Labour Day parade in Toronto, Ontario, in the early 1900s

Ten years later, on July 22, 1882, a huge labour celebration in Toronto attracted the attention of the American labour leader Peter J. McGuire, who organized a similar parade in New York City on September 5 that year. Unions associated with the Knights of Labor and the American Federation of Labor in both Canada and the United States subsequently promoted parades and festivals on the first Monday in September. In Canada during these years, local celebrations took place in Hamilton, Oshawa, St. Catharines, Ottawa, and London in Ontario, as well as Montreal, Quebec; Halifax, Nova Scotia; Vancouver, BC. Montreal declared a civic holiday in 1889. In Nova Scotia, coal miners had been holding picnics and parades since 1880 to celebrate the anniversary of their union, the Provincial Workmen's Association, first organized in 1879.

In 1889, the Royal Commission on the Relations of Labor and Capital in Canada recommended recognition of an official "labour day" by the federal government. In March and April 1894, unions lobbied Parliament to recognize Labour Day as a public holiday. Legislation was introduced in May by Prime Minister John Sparrow David Thompson and received royal assent in July 1894.

== Traditions ==
An old-fashioned tradition in Canada and the United States frowns upon the wearing of white after Labour Day. Explanations for this tradition vary; the most common is that white is a summer colour and Labour Day unofficially marks the end of summer. The rule may have been intended as a status symbol for new members of the upper and middle classes in the late 19th and early 20th century.

A Labour Day tradition in Atlantic Canada is the Wharf Rat Rally in Digby, Nova Scotia, while the rest of Canada watches the Labour Day Classic, a Canadian Football League event where rivals like Calgary Stampeders & Edmonton Elks, Hamilton Tiger-Cats & Toronto Argonauts (except in the 2011 and 2013 seasons, due to scheduling conflicts), and Saskatchewan Roughriders & Winnipeg Blue Bombers play on Labour Day weekend. Before the ending of the Ottawa Renegades after the 2005 season, that team played the nearby Montreal Alouettes on Labour Day weekend. Since the 2014 CFL season, when the Ottawa Redblacks began to play, the Montreal–Ottawa Labour Day tradition has once again been observed. Likewise, Ontario University Athletics has a long-established tradition to play university football on Labour Day.

There is an annual Labour Day parade in Grand Falls-Windsor, Newfoundland. The centennial anniversary in 2020 was replaced with an online ceremony due to the COVID-19 pandemic in Canada.

The Canadian International Air Show takes place along Toronto's waterfront for three days during the Labour Day weekend, the closing weekend of the Canadian National Exhibition.
