= Colton LeBlanc =

Canadian politician

The Honourable Colton LeBlanc ECNS MLA

Member of the Nova Scotia House of Assembly for Argyle Argyle-Barrington (2019–2021)
- Incumbent
- Assumed office September 3, 2019
- Preceded by: Chris d'Entremont
- Preceded by: Neil LeBlanc

Personal details
- Born: June 14, 1992 (age 33)
- Party: Progressive Conservative

Colton Fraser LeBlanc (born June 14, 1992) is a Canadian politician representing the electoral district of Argyle as a member of the Progressive Conservative Association of Nova Scotia caucus.

== Early life and education ==
Raised in Quinan, Nova Scotia, LeBlanc graduated from Université Sainte-Anne in 2013 with a Bachelor of Science Degree.

He continued his studies to become a primary care paramedic and later an advance care paramedic. LeBlanc practiced in Nova Scotia.

== Before politics ==
LeBlanc worked as a paramedic for five years before running for political office.

== Political career ==
LeBlanc was first elected to the Nova Scotia House of Assembly in a by-election on September 3, 2019, and re-elected in 2021 and 2024 Nova Scotia general election.

On August 7, 2021, LeBlanc helped save a man's life when he collapsed at a local community festival in Yarmouth County.

On August 31, 2021, LeBlanc was made Minister of the Public Service Commission, Service Nova Scotia and Internal Services, and Acadian Affairs and Francophonie.

On May 23, 2023, LeBlanc was sworn in as Nova Scotia’s first Minister of Cyber Security and Digital Solutions. The former Department of Service Nova Scotia and Internal Services’ name was shortened to Service Nova Scotia. LeBlanc retained the responsibility for Service Nova Scotia, as well as Acadian Affairs and Francophonie, the Public Service Commission and healthcare infrastructure projects.

In December 2024, LeBlanc was appointed Minister of Growth and Development, while remaining Minister of Acadian Affairs and Francophonie.

== Bills introduced ==
Assembly	Act Title	Date
Assembly 64, Session 1	Ardnamurchan Club Act (amended)	November 4, 2021
Assembly 64, Session 1	Collection and Debt Management Agencies Act (amended)	November 4, 2021
Assembly 64, Session 1	Interim Residential Rental Increase Cap Act	November 4, 2021
Assembly 64, Session 1	Residential Tenancies Act (amended)	November 4, 2021
Assembly 63, Session 2	Building Code Act (amended)	October 24, 2019
Assembly 63, Session 2	Health Authority Transparency Act	October 10, 2019

== Electoral record ==
2024 Nova Scotia general election: Argyle
Party	Candidate	Votes	%	±%
Progressive Conservative	Colton LeBlanc	3,383	85.60	+3.25
Liberal	Lorelei Murphy	439	11.11	-3.22
New Democratic	Lauren Skabar	67	1.70	+0.28
Green	Lynette Amirault	61	1.54	-0.36
Total valid votes/expense limit		3,950	99.32	–
Total rejected ballots		27	0.68	+0.32
Turnout		3,977	58.11	-9.43
Eligible voters		6,844		
Progressive Conservative hold		Swing		+3.24
Source: Elections Nova Scotia

2021 Nova Scotia general election: Argyle
Party	Candidate	Votes	%	±%	Expenditures
Progressive Conservative	Colton LeBlanc	3,649	82.35	+15.95	$25,657.16
Liberal	Nick d'Entremont	635	14.33	-15.46	$20,310.17
Green	Corey Clamp	84	1.90	–	$200.00
New Democratic	Robin Smith	63	1.42	-2.39	$10,293.32
Total valid votes/expense limit		4,431	99.66	–	$42,222.94
Total rejected ballots		15	0.34		
Turnout		4,446	67.54		
Eligible voters		6,583			
Progressive Conservative notional hold		Swing		+15.71	
Source: Elections Nova Scotia

Nova Scotia provincial by-election, September 3, 2019 upon the resignation of Chris d'Entremont
Party	Candidate	Votes	%	±%
Progressive Conservative	Colton LeBlanc	3,850	62.65	-2.43
Liberal	Charlene LeBlanc	1,880	30.59	+0.89
New Democratic	Robin Smith	213	3.47	-1.75
Green	Adam Randall	202	3.29	New
Total valid votes		6,145	99.64	
Total rejected ballots		22	0.36	-0.09
Turnout		6,167	48.83	-1.35
Eligible voters		12,630		
Progressive Conservative hold		Swing		-1.66
