= Robert Thibault =

Canadian politician

The Honourable Robert G. Thibault PC

Member of Parliament for West Nova
- In office November 27, 2000 – October 14, 2008
- Preceded by: Mark Muise
- Succeeded by: Greg Kerr

Personal details
- Born: September 29, 1959 (age 66) Digby, Nova Scotia
- Party: Liberal
- Spouse: Janice Boudreau
- Profession: Municipal administrator

Robert G. Thibault, PC (born September 29, 1959) is a Canadian politician.

== Early life ==
Thibault was born in Digby, Nova Scotia in 1959. He is the grandson of former provincial politician, Joseph William Comeau.

== Political career ==
Thibault served as a municipal councillor in Clare, Nova Scotia from 1988 to 2001 and was reelected in 2012. He is a member of the Liberal Party of Canada and a former member in the House of Commons of Canada, serving three terms as the representative of West Nova from 2000 to 2008. He won his first federal election in 2000. He was named Minister of State (Atlantic Canada Opportunities Agency) in 2001. He was Minister of Fisheries and Oceans from 2002 to 2003. He won re-election in 2004. Thibault was the Parliamentary Secretary to the Minister of Health from 2004 to 2006 under Paul Martin. In the 2006 election, he defeated Conservative opponent and former Nova Scotia cabinet minister Greg Kerr by 511 votes. On April 27, 2007, Thibault was named Liberal Critic for Competitiveness and the New Economy by Liberal leader Stéphane Dion. He was subsequently appointed Liberal critic for Health. Thibault was defeated in Canada's 40th general election on October 14, 2008, by Conservative opponent Greg Kerr.

On October 3, 2009, Thibault was once again nominated to contest the West Nova seat for the Liberals in the 2011 federal election. On May 2, 2011, Thibault was defeated in his comeback attempt, losing to Kerr by more than 4,000 votes.

=== Controversy ===
In August 2008, Thibault caused controversy with some accusing him of ageism when he suggested that his Conservative opponent Greg Kerr was too old for the job. Only five days later, Thibault was accused of sexism when he called Marjory LeBreton, then government leader in the Senate, an "idiot" and suggested she should "go back to making tea" for former prime minister Brian Mulroney. Three months later, Thibault lost his seat in the 2008 election.

== Electoral record ==
2011 Canadian federal election: West Nova
Party	Candidate	Votes	%	±%	Expenditures
Conservative	Greg Kerr	20,204	47.04	+7.10	$82,563.21
Liberal	Robert Thibault	15,632	36.39	+0.24	$62,177.30
New Democratic	George Barron	5,631	13.11	-3.78	$12,244.90
Green	Ross Johnson	1,487	3.46	-1.55	none listed
Total valid votes/expense limit		42,954	100.0		$86,810.95
Total rejected, unmarked and declined ballots		356	0.82	+0.10	
Turnout		43,310	63.75	+1.27	
Eligible voters		67,938			
Conservative hold		Swing		+3.43	

2008 Canadian federal election: West Nova
Party	Candidate	Votes	%	±%	Expenditures
Conservative	Greg Kerr	16,779	39.94	+1.83	$69,467.56
Liberal	Robert Thibault	15,185	36.15	-3.09	$57,096.02
New Democratic	George Barron	7,097	16.89	-1.95	$12,741.38
Green	Ronald Mills	2,106	5.01	+2.71	$123.04
Independent	Cindy M. Nesbitt	844	2.01	–	$10,570.22
Total valid votes/expense limit		42,011	100.0		$83,932
Total rejected, unmarked and declined ballots		304	0.72	+0.12	
Turnout		42,315	62.48	-1.20	
Eligible voters		67,722			
Conservative gain from Liberal		Swing		+2.46	

2006 Canadian federal election: West Nova
Party	Candidate	Votes	%	±%	Expenditures
Liberal	Robert Thibault	17,734	39.24	-3.42	$53,606.19
Conservative	Greg Kerr	17,222	38.11	+5.06	$54,945.96
New Democratic	Arthur Bull	8,512	18.84	-2.29	$25,148.83
Green	Matthew Granger	1,040	2.30	-0.92	$74.10
Independent	Ken Griffiths	681	1.51	–	$2,576.48
Total valid votes/expense limit		45,190	100.0		$79,451
Total rejected, unmarked and declined ballots		274	0.60	-0.21	
Turnout		45,464	63.68	-2.26	
Eligible voters		71,393			
Liberal hold		Swing		-4.24	

2004 Canadian federal election: West Nova
Party	Candidate	Votes	%	±%	Expenditures
Liberal	Robert Thibault	18,343	42.66	+8.06	$48,703.53
Conservative	Jon Carey	14,209	33.05	-20.44	$70,393.83
New Democratic	Arthur Bull	9,086	21.13	+9.67	$24,310.23
Green	Matthew Granger	1,385	3.22	–	none listed
Total valid votes/expense limit		42,996	100.0		$76,207
Total rejected, unmarked and declined ballots		352	0.81		
Turnout		43,348	65.94	+1.04	
Eligible voters		65,736			
Liberal notional gain from Progressive Conservative		Swing		+14.25	
Changes from 2000 are based on redistributed results. Change for the Conservative Party is based on the combined totals of the Progressive Conservative Party and the Canadian Alliance.

2000 Canadian federal election: West Nova
Party	Candidate	Votes	%	±%	Expenditures
Liberal	Robert Thibault	12,783	36.09	+10.39	$57,653
Progressive Conservative	Mark Muise	12,080	34.11	-0.20	$34,692
Alliance	Mike Donaldson	6,581	18.58	-0.23	$32,417
New Democratic	Phil Roberts	3,976	11.23	-9.23	$14,118
Total valid votes		35,420	100.00		
Total rejected, unmarked and declined ballots		235	0.66		
Turnout		35,655	67.98	-5.95	
Eligible voters		52,453			

Results for the Canadian Alliance from 1997 are based on the results of its predecessor, the Reform Party.

26th Canadian Ministry (1993–2003) – Cabinet of Jean Chrétien
Cabinet posts (2)
Predecessor	Office	Successor
Herb Dhaliwal	Minister of Fisheries and Oceans; 2002–2003	Geoff Regan
Bernie Boudreau	Minister of State (Atlantic Canada Opportunities Agency); 2001–2002	Gerry Byrne
