= Charles Haliburton =

Canadian politician

Charles E. Haliburton

MP for South Western Nova
- In office October 30, 1972 – July 8, 1974
- Preceded by: Louis-Roland Comeau
- Succeeded by: Coline Campbell

MP for South West Nova
- In office May 22, 1979 – February 18, 1980
- Preceded by: Coline Campbell
- Succeeded by: Coline Campbell

Personal details
- Born: April 23, 1938 (age 87) Wolfville, Nova Scotia
- Party: Progressive Conservative
- Occupation: Judge, politician

Charles Edward Haliburton (born April 23, 1938) is a jurist and former politician in the Canadian province of Nova Scotia.

== Education and legal career ==
Haliburton graduated from Acadia University in 1959 with a Bachelor of Arts and then from Dalhousie University in 1962 with a Bachelor of Laws. He was appointed Queen's Counsel in 1978. Haliburton served as an Adjudicator for Small Claims Court, as both a provincial and federal Crown Prosecutor, and as Solicitor for the Municipality and the Town of Digby. He also served as Councilor and then as Mayor of the Town of Digby.

Haliburton returned to private practice after politics and was subsequently appointed to the bench in 1993. He retired from the Nova Scotia Supreme Court in 2013.

== Political career ==
Haliburton was first elected to the House of Commons of Canada in the 1972 federal election as the Progressive Conservative Member of Parliament for South Western Nova. He lost his seat to Liberal challenger Coline Campbell in the 1974 federal election, but ran again in the renamed riding of South West Nova in the 1979 federal election that brought the Tories to power under Joe Clark after sixteen years of Liberal governance. He sat as a backbench supporter of Clark's minority government for seven months. Following the defeat of the Clark government in the House of Commons, another federal election was called in 1980, and Haliburton lost his seat in a rematch against Campbell.

=== Electoral record ===
1972 Canadian federal election: West Nova
Party	Candidate	Votes	%	±%
Progressive Conservative	Charles Haliburton	15,039	50.18	-2.15
Liberal	Fulton Logan	12,471	41.61	-2.61
New Democratic	Lawrence Meuse	2,104	7.02	+4.66
Social Credit	Charles Paddock	359	1.20	
Total valid votes		29,973	100.00	

1974 Canadian federal election: West Nova
Party	Candidate	Votes	%	±%
Liberal	Coline Campbell	15,066	49.10	7.49
Progressive Conservative	Charles Haliburton	13,841	45.11	-5.07
New Democratic	Yvonne Coe	1,610	5.25	-1.77
Social Credit	Cecilia Zwicker	164	0.53	-0.67
Total valid votes		30,681	100.00	

1979 Canadian federal election: West Nova
Party	Candidate	Votes	%	±%
Progressive Conservative	Charles Haliburton	16,512	44.47	-0.64
Liberal	Coline Campbell	16,398	44.17	-4.93
New Democratic	Ian MacPherson	4,217	11.36	+6.11
Total valid votes		37,127	100.00	

1980 Canadian federal election: West Nova
Party	Candidate	Votes	%	±%
Liberal	Coline Campbell	19,151	49.82	+5.65
Progressive Conservative	Charles Haliburton	14,151	36.81	-7.66
New Democratic	John Lee	4,922	12.80	+1.44
Independent	Anne Trudell	216	0.56	
Total valid votes		38,440	100.00	
lop.parl.ca
