= Argyle-Barrington =

Nova Scotia electoral district

Defunct provincial electoral district
- Legislature: Nova Scotia House of Assembly
- District created: 2012
- District abolished: 2021
- Last contested: 2019 By-election

Demographics
- Population (2016): 15,303
- Electors: 12,630
- Area (km²): 2,172.00
- Census division(s): Yarmouth County, Shelburne County
- Census subdivision(s): Municipality of Argyle, Clark's Harbour, Municipality of Barrington

Argyle-Barrington was a provincial electoral district in Nova Scotia, Canada, that elects one member of the Nova Scotia House of Assembly. The riding was created in 2012 with 100 per cent of the former district of Argyle and 52 per cent of the former district of Shelburne. It consists of the Municipality of Argyle, the town of Clark's Harbour, and the Municipality of Barrington. Fishing is the economic mainstay of the area, although manufacturing and the service sector are significant employers.

== Members of the Legislative Assembly ==
This riding has elected the following members of the Legislative Assembly:

Argyle-Barrington
Legislature	Years	Member	Party
Riding dissolved into Argyle and Shelburne
63rd	2019–2021	Colton LeBlanc	Progressive Conservative
62nd	2017–2019	Chris d'Entremont	Progressive Conservative
61st	2013–2017	Chris d'Entremont	Progressive Conservative
Riding created from Argyle and Shelburne

== Election results ==
Nova Scotia provincial by-election, September 3, 2019 upon the resignation of Chris d'Entremont
Party	Candidate	Votes	%	±%
Progressive Conservative	Colton LeBlanc	3,850	62.65	-2.43
Liberal	Charlene LeBlanc	1,880	30.59	+0.89
New Democratic	Robin Smith	213	3.47	-1.75
Green	Adam Randall	202	3.29	New
Total valid votes		6,145	99.64	
Total rejected ballots		22	0.36	-0.09
Turnout		6,167	48.83	-1.35
Eligible voters		12,630		
Progressive Conservative hold		Swing		-1.66

2017 Nova Scotia general election
Party	Candidate	Votes	%	±%
Progressive Conservative	Chris d'Entremont	4,031	65.08	+10.39
Liberal	Louis d'Entremont	1,840	29.71	-10.67
New Democratic	Greg Foster	323	5.21	+0.28
Total valid votes		6,194	99.55	
Total rejected ballots		28	0.45	-0.36
Turnout		6,222	50.17	-9.17
Eligible voters		12,401		
Progressive Conservative hold		Swing		+10.53
Source: Elections Nova Scotia

2013 Nova Scotia general election
Party	Candidate	Votes	%
Progressive Conservative	Chris d'Entremont	3,935	54.69
Liberal	Kent A. Blades	2,905	40.38
New Democratic	Kenn Baynton	355	4.93
Total		7,195	–
Total valid votes		7,195	
Total rejected ballots		59	0.81
Turnout		7,254	59.35
Eligible voters		12,223	
Source: Elections Nova Scotia
