= Argyle (electoral district) =

Provincial electoral district in Nova Scotia, Canada

Nova Scotia electoral district

Provincial electoral district
- Legislature: Nova Scotia House of Assembly
MLA
Colton LeBlanc
Progressive Conservative
- District created: 1981, 2019
- District abolished: 2013
- First contested: 1981
- Last contested: 2024

Demographics
- Population (2021): 7,860
- Electors (2024): 6,844
- Area (km²): 1,627
- Pop. density (per km²): 4.8
- Census division: Yarmouth County
- Census subdivision: Municipality of the District of Argyle

Argyle is a provincial electoral district in Nova Scotia, Canada, which existed between 1981 and 2013 and since 2021. It elects one member of the Nova Scotia House of Assembly. It was created in 1981 when the district of Yarmouth was split into two separate districts. The district comprises most of the Municipality of the District of Argyle, an Acadian area occupying the eastern half of Yarmouth County.

The electoral district was abolished following the 2012 electoral boundary review and was largely replaced by the new electoral district of Argyle-Barrington. It was re-created following the 2019 electoral boundary review out of Argyle-Barrington after a court challenge that also re-instated the province's two other protected Acadians ridings of Clare and Richmond, and the Black riding of Preston.

== Geography ==
The riding of Argyle has 1,627 km^{2} (628 sq mi) of landmass.

== Members of the Legislative Assembly ==
The electoral district was represented by the following members of the Legislative Assembly:

Argyle
Legislature	Years	Member	Party
Riding created from Yarmouth (1867–Present)
53rd	1981–1984	Hugh Tinkham	Liberal
54th	1984–1988	Neil LeBlanc	Progressive Conservative
55th	1988–1993	Neil LeBlanc	Progressive Conservative
56th	1993–1998	Allister Surette	Liberal
57th	1998–1999	Neil LeBlanc	Progressive Conservative
58th	1999–2003	Neil LeBlanc	Progressive Conservative
59th	2003–2006	Chris d'Entremont	Progressive Conservative
60th	2006–2009	Chris d'Entremont	Progressive Conservative
61st	2009–2013	Chris d'Entremont	Progressive Conservative
District dissolved into Argyle-Barrington
District recreated from Argyle-Barrington
64th	2021–2024	Colton LeBlanc	Progressive Conservative
65th	2024–present	Colton LeBlanc	Progressive Conservative

== Election results ==
=== 2024 ===
2024 Nova Scotia general election
Party	Candidate	Votes	%	±%
Progressive Conservative	Colton LeBlanc	3,383	85.60	+3.25
Liberal	Lorelei Murphy	439	11.11	-3.22
New Democratic	Lauren Skabar	67	1.70	+0.28
Green	Lynette Amirault	61	1.54	-0.36
Total valid votes/expense limit		3,950	99.32	–
Total rejected ballots		27	0.68	+0.32
Turnout		3,977	58.11	-9.43
Eligible voters		6,844		
Progressive Conservative hold		Swing		+3.24
Source: Elections Nova Scotia

=== 2021 ===
2021 Nova Scotia general election
Party	Candidate	Votes	%	±%	Expenditures
Progressive Conservative	Colton LeBlanc	3,649	82.35	+15.95	$25,657.16
Liberal	Nick d'Entremont	635	14.33	-15.46	$20,310.17
Green	Corey Clamp	84	1.90	–	$200.00
New Democratic	Robin Smith	63	1.42	-2.39	$10,293.32
Total valid votes/expense limit		4,431	99.66	–	$42,222.94
Total rejected ballots		15	0.34		
Turnout		4,446	67.54		
Eligible voters		6,583			
Progressive Conservative notional hold		Swing		+15.71	
Source: Elections Nova Scotia

=== 2017 (transposed) ===
2017 provincial election redistributed results
Party	Vote	%
Progressive Conservative	2,612	66.40
Liberal	1,172	29.79
New Democratic	150	3.81

=== 2009 ===
2009 Nova Scotia general election
Party	Candidate	Votes	%	±%
Progressive Conservative	Chris d'Entremont	2,818	64.00%	-3.65%
New Democratic	Melvin Huskins	759	17.24%	5.36%
Liberal	Lionel LeBlanc	752	17.08%	-2.48%
Green	Barbara Lake	74	1.68%	0.17%
Total valid votes		4,403	100.00	
Total rejected ballots		21	0.47	
Turnout		4,424	68.33	
Eligible voters		6,474		
Source(s) Source: Nova Scotia Legislature (2021). "Electoral History for Argyle" (PDF). nslegislature.ca.

=== 2006 ===
2006 Nova Scotia general election
Party	Candidate	Votes	%	±%
Progressive Conservative	Chris d'Entremont	3,158	67.65%	19.66%
Liberal	Christian Surette	913	19.56%	-20.27%
New Democratic	Charles Muise	531	11.38%	-0.80%
Green	Patty Doucet-Saunders	66	1.41%	–
Total valid votes		4,668	100.00	
Total rejected ballots		20	0.43	
Turnout		4,688	70.25	
Eligible voters		6,673		
Source(s) Source: Nova Scotia Legislature (2021). "Electoral History for Argyle" (PDF). nslegislature.ca.

=== 2003 ===
2003 Nova Scotia general election
Party	Candidate	Votes	%	±%
Progressive Conservative	Chris d'Entremont	2,345	47.99%	-29.02%
Liberal	Aldric Benoit d'Entremont	1,946	39.83%	24.27%
New Democratic	Charles Muise	595	12.18%	5.67%
Total valid votes		4,886	100.00	
Total rejected ballots		32	0.65	
Turnout		4,918	84.14	
Eligible voters		5,845		
Source(s) Source: Nova Scotia Legislature (2021). "Electoral History for Argyle" (PDF). nslegislature.ca.

=== 1999 ===
1999 Nova Scotia general election
Party	Candidate	Votes	%	±%
Progressive Conservative	Neil LeBlanc	4,060	77.01%	23.42%
Liberal	Karen Kravfe	820	15.55%	-17.92%
New Democratic	Belinda Tucker	343	6.51%	-5.02%
Nova Scotia Party	Oscar Harris	49	0.93%	–
Total valid votes		5,272	100.00	
Total rejected ballots		20	0.38	
Turnout		5,292	80.21	
Eligible voters		6,598		
Source(s) Source: Nova Scotia Legislature (2021). "Electoral History for Argyle" (PDF). nslegislature.ca.

=== 1998 ===
1998 Nova Scotia general election
Party	Candidate	Votes	%	±%
Progressive Conservative	Neil LeBlanc	3,028	53.59%	9.31%
Liberal	Allister Surette	1,891	33.47%	-18.52%
New Democratic	Diane E. Cromwell	651	11.52%	7.79%
Independent	Oscar Harris	80	1.42%	–
Total valid votes		5,650	100.00	
Total rejected ballots		20	0.35	
Turnout		5,670	84.98	
Eligible voters		6,672		
Source(s) Source: Nova Scotia Legislature (2021). "Electoral History for Argyle" (PDF). nslegislature.ca.

=== 1993 ===
1993 Nova Scotia general election
Party	Candidate	Votes	%	±%
Liberal	Allister Surette	3,091	51.98%	20.54%
Progressive Conservative	Neil LeBlanc	2,633	44.28%	-19.86%
New Democratic	Dee Dee Daigle	222	3.73%	-0.67%
Total valid votes		5,946	100.00	
Total rejected ballots		38	0.64	
Turnout		5,984	86.93	
Eligible voters		6,884		
Source(s) Source: Nova Scotia Legislature (2021). "Electoral History for Argyle" (PDF). nslegislature.ca.

=== 1988 ===
1988 Nova Scotia general election
Party	Candidate	Votes	%	±%
Progressive Conservative	Neil LeBlanc	3,798	64.14%	11.63%
Liberal	Rick Murphy	1,862	31.45%	-12.50%
New Democratic	Raymond Ethier	261	4.41%	0.87%
Total		5,921	–	
Source(s) Source: Nova Scotia Legislature (2021). "Electoral History for Argyle" (PDF). nslegislature.ca.

=== 1984 ===
1984 Nova Scotia general election
Party	Candidate	Votes	%	±%
Progressive Conservative	Neil LeBlanc	2,894	52.51%	13.20%
Liberal	J. Donald Doucette	2,422	43.95%	-10.03%
New Democratic	Lawrence Meuse	195	3.54%	-3.17%
Total		5,511	–	
Source(s) Source: Nova Scotia Legislature (2021). "Electoral History for Argyle" (PDF). nslegislature.ca.

=== 1981 ===
1981 Nova Scotia general election
Party	Candidate	Votes	%
Liberal	Hugh Tinkham	2,872	53.97%
Progressive Conservative	Peter J. Boudreau	2,092	39.32%
New Democratic	Roy (Sonny) Murphy	357	6.71%
Total		5,321	–
Source(s) Source: Nova Scotia Legislature (2021). "Electoral History for Argyle" (PDF). nslegislature.ca.

== See also ==
- List of Nova Scotia provincial electoral districts
- Canadian provincial electoral districts
