= Allister Surette =

Canadian politician

The Honourable Allister Surette ECNS

Canadian Senator from Nova Scotia
- Incumbent
- Assumed office December 19, 2024
- Nominated by: Justin Trudeau
- Appointed by: Mary Simon

President of Université Sainte-Anne
- In office July 1, 2011 – June 30, 2024
- Preceded by: André Roberge
- Succeeded by: Kenneth Deveau

Member of the Nova Scotia House of Assembly for Argyle
- In office May 25, 1993 – March 24, 1998
- Preceded by: Neil LeBlanc
- Succeeded by: Neil LeBlanc

Personal details
- Born: September 21, 1961 (age 64) Yarmouth, Nova Scotia
- Party: Independent Senators Group
- Other political affiliations: Liberal (until 1998)

Allister Wilbert Surette (born September 21, 1961) is a Canadian politician who has served as a senator from Nova Scotia since December 2024. He was the President and Vice-Chancellor of Université Sainte-Anne from 2011 to 2024 and previously represented the electoral district of Argyle in the Nova Scotia House of Assembly from 1993 to 1998 as a member of the Nova Scotia Liberal Party.

== Early life and education ==
Born in Yarmouth, Nova Scotia, Surette was raised in the Acadian community of Lower West Pubnico. He graduated with a Bachelor of Science from Dalhousie University and a Bachelor of Education from Saint Mary's University in 1984. He was a high school teacher by career.

== Political career ==
Surette entered provincial politics in the 1993 election, defeating Progressive Conservative cabinet minister Neil LeBlanc in the Argyle riding. Surette served as Deputy Government House Leader prior to serving as the Special Policy Advisor on Acadian and Francophone governance for the public school system, in the Executive Council of Nova Scotia as Minister of Human Resources, Minister in charge of the Youth Secretariat and the Office of Acadian Affairs, and Minister of Housing and Municipal Affairs.

In a re-match from 1993, Surette was defeated by LeBlanc when he ran for re-election in 1998.

== Collège de l'Acadie ==
Between 1998 and 2003, he was chief executive officer of the Collège de l'Acadie, which was the only French-language community college in Nova Scotia.

== Université Sainte-Anne ==
In 2003, Surette became vice-president of Development and Partnerships of Université Sainte-Anne.

In November 2010, Surette was named president and Vice-Chancellor of Université Sainte-Anne. He took office as president on July 1, 2011.

In October 2019, Surette was appointed Chair of the Association of Atlantic Universities, an advocacy organization working on behalf of the region's 16 universities.

During Surette's tenure, the university achieved a record full-time student population of 540 students for the 2019–2020 academic year, exceeding the previous record of 481 students in 2008.

During the third term of Surette's presidency at Sainte-Anne, in 2022, the faculty union engaged in a strike that was the longest university strike in Nova Scotia's history and one of the longest in Canadian history.

In September 2023, a student campaign, SA Change Now, posted anonymous survivors' and victims' accounts of sexual harassment, assault, and rape at Sainte-Anne on a website and on its Instagram account. The campaign called on the university to acknowledge rape culture, apologize to its victims, and promise to enact the campaign's five suggested reforms.

Surette ended his mandate as President and Vice-Chancellor of Sainte-Anne, on June 30, 2024.

== Senate ==
On December 19, 2024, he was summoned to the Senate of Canada by Governor General Mary Simon, on the advice of prime minister Justin Trudeau. On February 12, 2025, Surette announced that he had joined the Independent Senators Group. He was the chair of the Canadian Senate Standing Committee on Official Languages in the 45th Canadian Parliament.

== Other work ==
From 1999 to 2003, Surette was a member of the Board of Trustees of du Réseau des cégeps et collèges francophones du Canada (RCCFC), serving as chair from September 2000 to November 2002.

In December 1999, Surette was elected chairman of the executive committee for the 2004 Acadian World Congress. Surette had previously served as President of the organizing committee and then served as chairman of the board of directors.

In November 2000, Surette was appointed to a provincial advisory committee created help meet the needs of the Acadian community.

In December 2003, Surette was appointed facilitator by the Minister of Fisheries and Oceans to lead discussions between herring fishers from Prince Edward Island, New Brunswick, and their respective provincial governments to seek solutions to the conflict in the herring fishery in the southern Gulf of St. Lawrence.

In March 2006, Surette was appointed by the Canadian Minister of Fisheries and Oceans to facilitate an independent process to resolve a dispute between fishers from Prince Edward Island and the Magdalen Islands regarding lobster fishing on MacLeod's Ledge.

From 2007 to 2018, Surette served as a member of the board of directors for Assumption Life.

In May 2011, Surette was appointed as a member of the board of trustees for the Voluntary Sector Professional Capacity Trust, a trust to support developing human resource policies, business planning and assessing the needs of an organization.

In July 2012, Surette was one of three members appointed to serve on an expert panel reviewing the Regional Development Authority model.

In February 2014, Surette was appointed to the inaugural Board of Directors of the Western Regional Enterprise Network (WREN).

In May 2014, Surette was appointed transition co-ordinator to oversee the dissolution of the town of Bridgetown into the Municipality of the County of Annapolis.

In December 2018, Surette was appointed to the inaugural Board of Directors of Research Nova Scotia.

In December 2019, Surette was appointed chair of the organizing committee for the 2024 Acadian World Congress.

In October 2020, Surette was named the Federal Special Representative, a neutral third-party whose responsibility was to communicate with and rebuild trust between commercial and Indigenous fishers in Southwestern Nova Scotia. In March 2021, Surette released his Final Report as Federal Special Representative.

== Recognition and awards ==
In 2004, Surette was awarded the Prix du Père Léger Comeau.

In October 2008, Surette was awarded the Order of La Pléiade which recognizes parliamentarians and community leaders for outstanding work in advancing francophone causes.

In 2010, Surette was made an honorary member of the Executive Council by the Lieutenant Governor of Nova Scotia.

In October 2019, Surette was one of seven people named to the Order of the Francophones of America which recognizes commitment to the French language and culture in the Americas.

== Electoral record ==
1998 Nova Scotia general election
Party	Candidate	Votes	%	±%
Progressive Conservative	Neil LeBlanc	3,028	53.60	+9.32
Liberal	Allister Surette	1,891	33.50	-18.48
New Democratic Party	Dianne Crowell	651	11.50	+7.77
Nova Scotia Party	Oscar Harris	80	1.40	

1993 Nova Scotia general election
Party	Candidate	Votes	%	±%
Liberal	Allister Surette	3,091	51.98	+20.53
Progressive Conservative	Neil LeBlanc	2,633	44.28	-19.86
New Democratic Party	Dee Dee Daigle	222	3.73	-0.68
