= Coline Campbell =

Canadian politician

Coline M. Campbell

MP for South Western Nova
- In office 8 July 1974 – 22 May 1979
- Preceded by: Charles Haliburton
- Succeeded by: Charles Haliburton

MP for South West Nova
- In office 18 February 1980 – 4 September 1984
- Preceded by: Charles Haliburton
- Succeeded by: Gerald Comeau

MP for South West Nova
- In office 21 November 1988 – 25 October 1993
- Preceded by: Gerald Comeau
- Succeeded by: Harry Verran

Personal details
- Born: 26 September 1940 (age 85) Digby County, Nova Scotia
- Party: Liberal
- Occupation: Lawyer, teacher, politician

Coline M. Campbell (born 26 September 1940) is a former member of the House of Commons of Canada in the 30th (1974–1979), 32nd (1980–1984) and 34th (1988–1993) Canadian Parliaments. Campbell was the first woman from Nova Scotia elected to the House of Commons.

== Before politics ==
Prior to entering politics, Campbell was a teacher and lawyer.

== Political career ==
Campbell was first elected in the 1974 federal election at the South Western Nova electoral district for the Liberal Party. She served as a backbench supporter of Prime Minister Pierre Trudeau's government. After her first term in Parliament, she was defeated by Charles E. Haliburton of the Progressive Conservative (PC) Party in the 1979 federal election; following electoral redistribution in 1976, her riding had been renamed South West Nova.

Following the short-lived Progressive Conservative minority government of Joe Clark, she was re-elected at South West Nova in 1980. She served as a government-side backbencher under Pierre Trudeau and John Turner until the 1984 Canadian federal election, when she lost the seat again to PC challenger Gerald Comeau.

Her last term in Parliament began with her second comeback in the 1988 federal election. She served in opposition under John Turner and Jean Chrétien. She did not seek another term in Parliament after this and left federal politics as of the 1993 federal election.

=== Electoral record ===
1974 Canadian federal election: West Nova
Party	Candidate	Votes	%	±%
Liberal	Coline Campbell	15,066	49.10	7.49
Progressive Conservative	Charles Haliburton	13,841	45.11	-5.07
New Democratic	Yvonne Coe	1,610	5.25	-1.77
Social Credit	Cecilia Zwicker	164	0.53	-0.67
Total valid votes		30,681	100.00	

1979 Canadian federal election: West Nova
Party	Candidate	Votes	%	±%
Progressive Conservative	Charles Haliburton	16,512	44.47	-0.64
Liberal	Coline Campbell	16,398	44.17	-4.93
New Democratic	Ian MacPherson	4,217	11.36	+6.11
Total valid votes		37,127	100.00	

1980 Canadian federal election: West Nova
Party	Candidate	Votes	%	±%
Liberal	Coline Campbell	19,151	49.82	+5.65
Progressive Conservative	Charles Haliburton	14,151	36.81	-7.66
New Democratic	John Lee	4,922	12.80	+1.44
Independent	Anne Trudell	216	0.56	
Total valid votes		38,440	100.00	
lop.parl.ca

1984 Canadian federal election: West Nova
Party	Candidate	Votes	%	±%
Progressive Conservative	Gerald Comeau	20,604	50.59	+13.78
Liberal	Coline Campbell	17,044	41.85	-7.97
New Democratic	Bob Ritchie	3,076	7.55	-5.25
Total valid votes		40,724	100.00	

1988 Canadian federal election: West Nova
Party	Candidate	Votes	%	±%
Liberal	Coline Campbell	21,062	50.01	+8.16
Progressive Conservative	Gerald Comeau	17,482	41.51	-9.08
New Democratic	Peter Zavitz	2,396	5.69	-1.86
Christian Heritage	Angus M. McLean	1,172	2.78	
Total valid votes		42,112	100.00	
