= Admiral Digby Museum =

Museum in Nova Scotia, Canada

Coordinates: 44°37′12.2″N 65°45′17.5″W

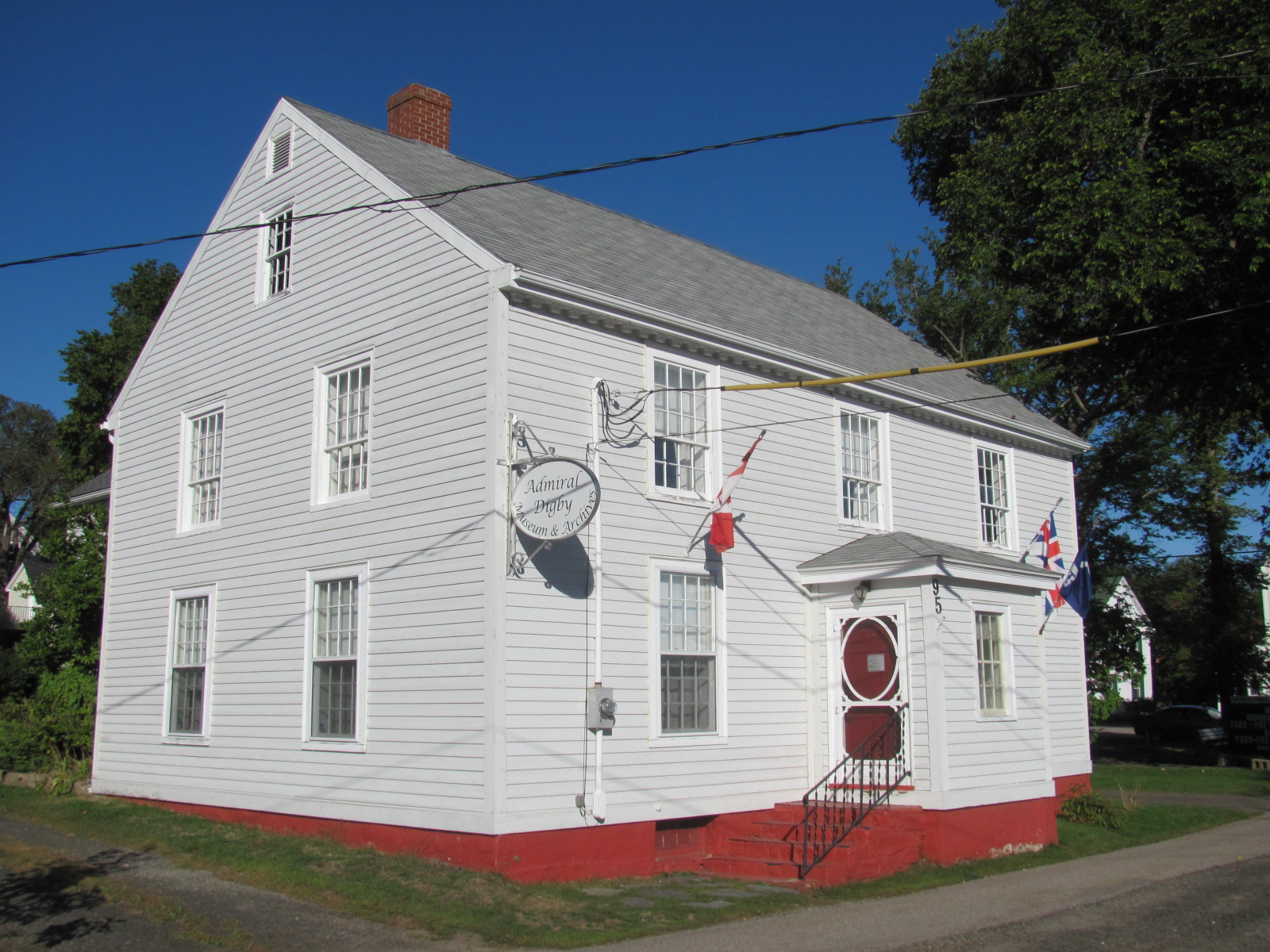
- Established: 1972
- Location: 95 Montague Row, Digby, Nova Scotia, Canada
- Type: Municipal Museum
- Website: admiraldigbymuseum.ca

The Admiral Digby Museum is a museum in Digby, Nova Scotia, that explores the history of Digby and the surrounding communities of Digby County. It is housed in a restored Georgian style house facing Digby Harbour, known as the Woodrow/Dakin House. One of the oldest buildings in Digby, the house was purchased in 1968 by the Digby Library Association and became the home of the town's first library. A historical society was formed at the library and opened a small display in 1972. The historical society took ownership of the building in 1977, and after the library had moved to larger quarters in 1980, the museum occupied the entire building. The museum is named after Admiral Robert Digby, who brought Loyalists settlers to the town in 1783. The museum is free and open year-round. Its collection includes rare furniture, textiles, photographs, and maps. A marine room displays many artifacts from Digby's maritime history. A highlight of the collection is the Gilpin Collection of spectacular watercolour paintings of Sable Island, which were made by a Digby resident who visited the island in the 1850s.

== See also ==
- List of museums in Nova Scotia
