= Gerald Comeau =

Canadian politician (1946–2023)

The Honourable Gerald Comeau PC

Senator for Nova Scotia
- In office August 30, 1990 – November 30, 2013
- Appointed by: Brian Mulroney

Member of the Canadian Parliament for West Nova
- In office September 4, 1984 – November 21, 1988
- Preceded by: Coline Campbell
- Succeeded by: Coline Campbell

Personal details
- Born: February 1, 1946 Meteghan Station, Nova Scotia, Canada
- Died: December 4, 2023 (aged 77) Yarmouth, Nova Scotia, Canada
- Party: Conservative
- Spouse: Aurore

Gerald J. Comeau PC (February 1, 1946 – December 4, 2023) was a Canadian politician who served as a senator and as a member of Parliament.

== Early life ==
Born in Meteghan Station, Nova Scotia, Comeau was an accountant by training. Comeau received his B.Comm and his B.Ed from the Université de Moncton.

Comeau was a member of Nova Scotia's Acadian minority.

== Political career ==
Comeau was elected to the House of Commons of Canada as part of the Progressive Conservative landslide win in the 1984 election. The member of Parliament for South West Nova, Comeau was a government backbencher throughout his term and was defeated in the 1988 election due in part to the unpopularity of the Canada–United States Free Trade Agreement in Atlantic Canada.

In 1990, Comeau was appointed to the Senate by Governor General Ray Hnatyshyn, on the advice of Prime Minister Brian Mulroney. He sat as a Progressive Conservative until February 2004. He then became a Conservative Party senator after the merger of the Progressive Conservative and the Canadian Alliance parties. He served as deputy leader of the Government in the Senate from February 23, 2006 to May 24, 2011.

On January 19, 2013, Governor General David Johnston, on the advice of Prime Minister Stephen Harper, appointed Comeau to the Privy Council.

Comeau retired from the Senate on November 30, 2013, seven years before reaching the mandatory retirement age of 75.

== Death ==
Comeau died from cancer at a hospital in Yarmouth, Nova Scotia on December 4, 2023, at the age of 77.

== Electoral record ==
1984 Canadian federal election: West Nova
Party	Candidate	Votes	%	±%
Progressive Conservative	Gerald Comeau	20,604	50.59	+13.78
Liberal	Coline Campbell	17,044	41.85	-7.97
New Democratic	Bob Ritchie	3,076	7.55	-5.25
Total valid votes		40,724	100.00	

1988 Canadian federal election: West Nova
Party	Candidate	Votes	%	±%
Liberal	Coline Campbell	21,062	50.01	+8.16
Progressive Conservative	Gerald Comeau	17,482	41.51	-9.08
New Democratic	Peter Zavitz	2,396	5.69	-1.86
Christian Heritage	Angus M. McLean	1,172	2.78	
Total valid votes		42,112	100.00	
