= Mark Muise =

Canadian politician

Member of Parliament for West Nova
- In office 2 June 1997 – 27 November 2000
- Preceded by: Harry Verran
- Succeeded by: Robert Thibault

Personal details
- Born: 11 October 1957 (age 68) Mayflower, Nova Scotia
- Party: Progressive Conservative
- Profession: Insurance agent

Mark Muise (born 11 October 1957) is a Canadian businessman and former politician, Muise served as a Member of Parliament from 1997 to 2000. He represented the electoral district of West Nova for the Progressive Conservative Party. He is an insurance agent by career.

== Early life and education ==
Muise graduated from Université de Moncton in 1979 with a Bachelor of Business Administration.

== Political career ==
In the 1997 federal election, Muise defeated Liberal incumbent Harry Verran. Muise was defeated in the 2000 election by Liberal candidate Robert Thibault.

== Electoral record ==
2000 Canadian federal election: West Nova
Party	Candidate	Votes	%	±%	Expenditures
Liberal	Robert Thibault	12,783	36.09	+10.39	$57,653
Progressive Conservative	Mark Muise	12,080	34.11	-0.20	$34,692
Alliance	Mike Donaldson	6,581	18.58	-0.23	$32,417
New Democratic	Phil Roberts	3,976	11.23	-9.23	$14,118
Total valid votes		35,420	100.00		
Total rejected, unmarked and declined ballots		235	0.66		
Turnout		35,655	67.98	-5.95	
Eligible voters		52,453			

Results for the Canadian Alliance from 1997 are based on the results of its predecessor, the Reform Party.

1997 Canadian federal election: West Nova
Party	Candidate	Votes	%	±%	Expenditures
Progressive Conservative	Mark Muise	13,187	34.31	+11.64	$37,592
Liberal	Harry Verran	9,877	25.70	-29.19	$47,082
New Democratic	Brian Noble	7,862	20.46	+14.87	$4,426
Reform	Betty Cox	7,229	18.81	+3.66	$25,210
Natural Law	Neeraj Lakhanpal	275	0.72	-0.98	$0.00
Total valid votes		38,430	100.00		
Total rejected, unmarked and declined ballots		338	0,87		
Turnout		38,768	73.93		
Eligible voters		52,441			

== Personal life ==
Muise is married to Paulette and together they have two grown daughters, Mila and Sara.
