= Colin Fraser (Canadian politician) =

Canadian politician

Member of Parliament for West Nova
- In office October 19, 2015 – September 11, 2019
- Preceded by: Greg Kerr
- Succeeded by: Chris d'Entremont

Personal details
- Born: July 27, 1978 (age 48) Yarmouth, Nova Scotia
- Party: Liberal
- Education: Carleton University; Dalhousie University
- Profession: Lawyer

Colin Fraser (born July 27, 1978) is a Canadian politician, who was elected to represent the riding of West Nova in the House of Commons of Canada in the 2015 Canadian federal election. He did not seek re-election in the 2019 Canadian federal election.

== Early life and education ==
Fraser was born in Yarmouth to Hugh Jon and Sharon Fraser. His father died of leukemia before Colin was 6. In 1996, he graduated from Yarmouth Consolidated Memorial High School and he then graduated from Carleton University in 2000 majoring in Political Science. He studied law in London, England and then graduated from Dalhousie Law School in 2007 with a Bachelor of Laws.

== Legal career ==
He is a lawyer and partner at Yarmouth law firm Hood Fraser D’Entremont.

== Political career ==
Elected in 2015, Fraser sponsored the private member bill, Bill C-311, which added the word legal to the Holidays Acts description of Remembrance Day.

== Electoral record ==
2015 Canadian federal election: West Nova
Party	Candidate	Votes	%	±%	Expenditures
Liberal	Colin Fraser	28,775	62.99	+26.60	$87,337.64
Conservative	Arnold LeBlanc	11,916	26.09	–20.95	$41,005.69
New Democratic	Greg Foster	3,084	6.75	–6.36	$25,617.41
Green	Clark Walton	1,904	4.17	+0.71	$2,291.24
Total valid votes/expense limit		45,679	100.00		$210,111.37
Total rejected ballots		271	0.59		
Turnout		45,950	68.79		
Eligible voters		66,796			
Liberal gain from Conservative		Swing		+23.78	
Source: Elections Canada
