= Louis-Roland Comeau =

Canadian politician

President of Université Sainte-Anne
- In office 1971–1977
- Succeeded by: Omer Blinn

Member of the Canadian Parliament for South Western Nova
- In office 25 June 1968 – 30 October 1972
- Preceded by: Riding created
- Succeeded by: Charles Haliburton

Personal details
- Born: 7 January 1941 (age 85) Meteghan, Nova Scotia, Canada
- Party: Progressive Conservative
- Profession: professor

Louis-Roland Comeau, CM (born 7 January 1941) was a Progressive Conservative party member of the House of Commons of Canada. He was a professor by career.

== Biography ==
=== Education ===
Comeau graduated with a Bachelor of Education degree from Dalhousie University after obtaining an engineering and science degree from Saint Mary's University.

=== Political career ===
He was first elected at the South Western Nova riding in the 1968 general election. After serving in the 28th Canadian Parliament, Comeau left federal office and did not campaign in the 1972 election.

=== After politics ===
Since that time he served on various boards, chairing life insurance company Assomption Vie and air traffic control operator Nav Canada. He also chaired the Independent Review Panel on New Brunswick's Workplace Health, Safety and Compensation System from 2007 to 2008.

A library at Université Sainte-Anne bears his name, where he became chancellor in 1994. He also became the seventh chancellor of the University of Moncton in 2004.

Comeau became a Member of the Order of Canada in 2002.

=== Personal life ===
Comeau and his wife, Clarice Theriault, have three children.

== Electoral record ==
1968 Canadian federal election: West Nova
Party	Candidate	Votes	%
Progressive Conservative	Louis-Roland Comeau	14,543	52.33
Liberal	John Stewart	12,290	44.22
New Democratic	Rae Gilman	655	2.36
Independent PC	N. Evan Atkinson	293	1.05
Total valid votes		27,791	100.00
