= Wharf Rat Rally =

Canadian motorcycle rally

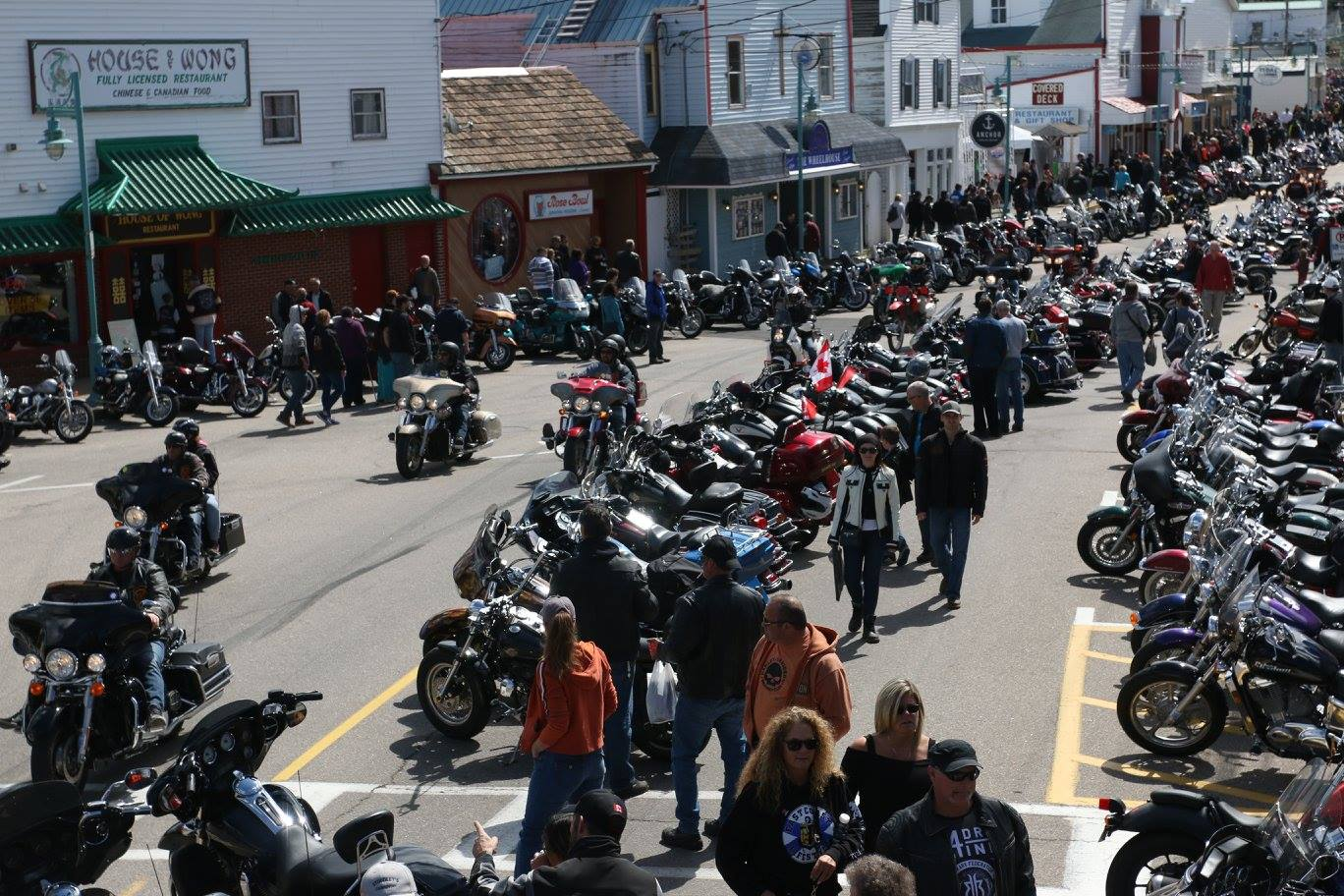
- Bikes at the Rally on Water Street, Digby, Nova Scotia
- Frequency: Annual
- Location: Digby, Nova Scotia
- Established: 2005
- Founders: Peter Robertson, Alex Joannides
- Previous event: August 28 - September 1, 2019
- Next event: 2022
- Attendance: 18,534 vehicles (2019)
- Major events: Live music, Vendors, Watersport demonstrations, Contests
- Organizer: Wharf Rat Rally Motorcycle Association
- Website: www.wharfratrally.com

The Digby Wharf Rat Rally is one of Canada's largest motorcycle rallies, attracting thousands of motorcycles, riders and other spectators to Digby, Nova Scotia. From August 31, to September 3, 2017 the Wharf Rat Rally had an overall attendance of more than 8,000 motorbikes and nearly 22,000 individual participants, including almost 17,000 out of town visitors.

The Wharf Rat Rally is an annual five day event established in 2005, beginning the Wednesday prior to Labour Day Weekend and continuing until Sunday evening. The heart of the rally is the central town of Digby with events taking advantage of both the streetscape and the water. The event features a wide variety of activities including vendors, raffles, 50/50, watersport demonstrations, guided tours, live bands, stunt riders, demonstrations, custom bikes, ride outs, and workshops.

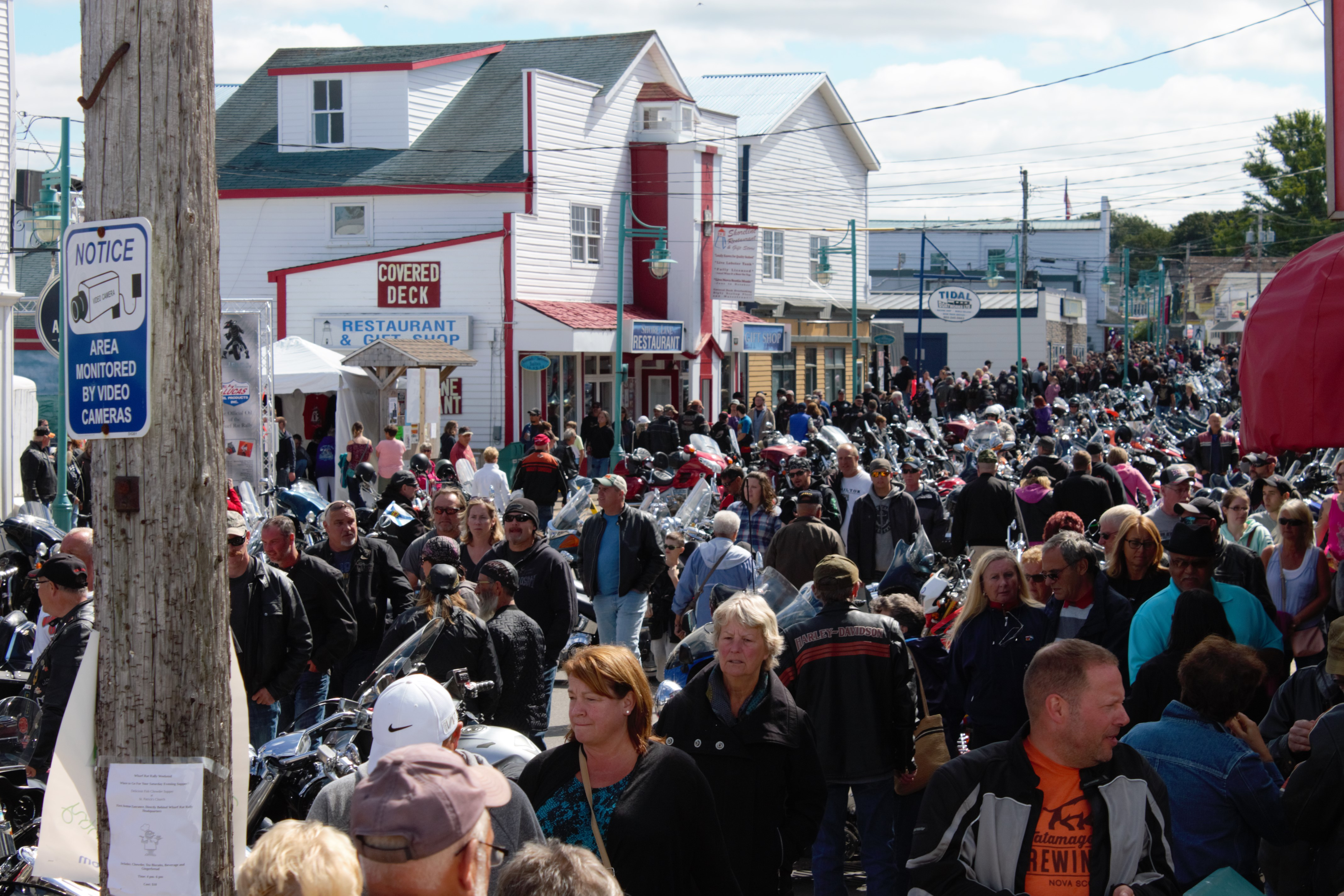
Visitors at the Rally on Water Street, Digby, Nova Scotia

Community events are strongly supported by the Rally:- providing visits to long-term care facilities; give a kid a ride event; memorial ride outs; blessing of the bikes. Funds are also raised on a variety of projects with the Philae Shriners, the Royal Canadian Legion Branch 20, the Digby Search and Rescue, the Order of the Eastern Star and the Goldwing Road Riders Association.

The Rally's mission is to plan, organize, and host the best family-friendly motorcycle rally event in Canada, appealing to bikers and non-bikers alike, contributing to the economies of Digby, surrounding communities, and the province of Nova Scotia. The Wharf Rat Rally's volunteer creed is 'Integrity, Respect and Trust'.

Funded 50% by bike registrations to park downtown; 25% by federal, provincial and town grants; 25% by sponsors, advertisers and hosts.

== Notable occurrences ==
In 2013, several of the 2014 Harley-Davidson models were introduced to the Canadian market at the event.

In 2015 the event hosted Canadian musicians Matt Minglewood and Sam Moon, as well as Sons of Anarchy actors Kim Coates and Theo Rossi for autograph signings.

== Awards ==
List of awards received by The Wharf Rat Rally
Award	Year	Presented by
Ambassador Award	Unknown	Tourism Industry Association of Nova Scotia
Event Legacy Award	Unknown	Annapolis Valley Events and Sport Tourism Association
Tourism Excellence Award	Unknown	Digby and Area Board of Trade

== Wharf Rat Rally in the Community in 2017 ==
In 2018 the Association released an economic impact report regarding their 2017 event. The information in the report is summarized below.

- Largest Wharf Rat Rally in Canada.
- Involves over 300 volunteers.
- Close to $20,000 donated to other non-profits and charities each year.
- Annual visits to 4 long-term care facilities
- Annual visits to 3 adult community living centres.
- Annual visits to the Digby Hospital.
- Run by a provincially registered not-for-profit society governed by a volunteer Board of Directors.
- $4.9 Million boost to Nova Scotia's GDP and $6.7 Million in visitor spending directly attributable to the Wharf Rat Rally, Digby.
