= Acadie—Annapolis =

Federal electoral district in Nova Scotia, Canada

Nova Scotia electoral district
- Interactive map of riding boundaries from the 2025 federal election
- Coordinates: 44°27′N 65°35′W

Federal electoral district
- Legislature: House of Commons
MP
Chris d'Entremont
Liberal
- District created: 1966
- First contested: 1968
- Last contested: 2025
- District webpage: profile, map

Demographics
- Population (2021): 83,571
- Electors (2025): 66,361
- Area (km²): 8,885
- Pop. density (per km²): 9.4
- Census division(s): Annapolis, Digby, Kings, Yarmouth
- Census subdivision(s): Kings (part), Annapolis, Yarmouth, Argyle, Clare, Digby, Yarmouth, Digby, Middleton, Annapolis Royal

Acadie—Annapolis (formerly West Nova) is a federal electoral district in Nova Scotia, Canada, that has been represented in the House of Commons of Canada since 1968.

South Western Nova and South West Nova were ridings that covered roughly the same geographic area and were represented in the House of Commons from 1968 to 1979 and 1979 to 1997, respectively.

The district is rural with a few small towns and communities located along the coast. The riding has been called a microcosm of rural Canada because it includes fishing, farming, tourism, small business and an English-French mix.

== History ==
The electoral district was created in 1966 from "Digby—Annapolis—Kings" and "Shelburne—Yarmouth—Clare" ridings. It was composed of Yarmouth County, Digby County, and the western portion of Annapolis County.

In 1978, it gained the eastern portion of Annapolis County from "Annapolis Valley".

In 1996, Seal Island was added and the name was changed from "South West Nova" to "West Nova".

In 2004, 20 percent of "Kings—Hants" was added to the district. The boundaries remained unchanged as per the 2012 federal electoral redistribution. From 1968 until 2004, the Riding was notable for never having elected a single person to a second consecutive term until Robert Thibault won in 2004.

Following the 2022 Canadian federal electoral redistribution, this riding was renamed Acadie—Annapolis. It lost some territory (Berwick area) in Kings County to Kings—Hants. These changes came into effect upon the calling of the 2025 Canadian federal election.

== Demographics ==
According to the 2021 Canadian census, 2023 representation order

Languages: 85.4% English, 14.4% French
Race: 85.5% White, 11.0% Indigenous, 1.8% Black
Religions: 59.0% Christian (25.3% Catholic, 13.7% Baptist, 4.4% Anglican, 3.4% United Church, 1.5% Methodist, 1.1% Pentecostal, 9.5% other), 39.7% none
Median income: $33,200 (2020)
Average income: $40,320 (2020)

== Geography ==
It reaches from Aylesford in Kings County (it only includes the western part of Kings County) down through Annapolis County, Digby County and Yarmouth County, ending at the Yarmouth-Shelburne border.

== Members of Parliament ==
This riding has elected the following members of Parliament:

Parliament	Years	Member	Party
South Western Nova; Riding created from Digby—Annapolis—Kings and Shelburne—Yarmouth—Clare
28th	1968–1972	Louis-Roland Comeau	Progressive Conservative
29th	1972–1974	Charles Haliburton	Progressive Conservative
30th	1974–1979	Coline Campbell	Liberal
South West Nova
31st	1979–1980	Charles Haliburton	Progressive Conservative
32nd	1980–1984	Coline Campbell	Liberal
33rd	1984–1988	Gerald Comeau	Progressive Conservative
34th	1988–1993	Coline Campbell	Liberal
35th	1993–1997	Harry Verran	Liberal
West Nova
36th	1997–2000	Mark Muise	Progressive Conservative
37th	2000–2004	Robert Thibault	Liberal
38th	2004–2006	Robert Thibault	Liberal
39th	2006–2008	Robert Thibault	Liberal
40th	2008–2011	Greg Kerr	Conservative
41st	2011–2015	Greg Kerr	Conservative
42nd	2015–2019	Colin Fraser	Liberal
43rd	2019–2021	Chris d'Entremont	Conservative
44th	2021–2025	Chris d'Entremont	Conservative
Acadie—Annapolis
45th	2025–2025	Chris d'Entremont	Conservative
45th	2025–present	Chris d'Entremont	Liberal

== Election results ==
Graph of election results in South Western Nova, South West Nova, and West Nova (minor parties that never got 2% of the vote or didn't run consistently are omitted) View source data.

=== Acadie—Annapolis ===
2025 Canadian federal election
Party	Candidate	Votes	%	±%	Expenditures
Conservative	Chris d'Entremont	23,024	47.67	−3.64	
Liberal	Ronnie LeBlanc	22,491	46.57	+15.88	
New Democratic	Ingrid Deon	1,768	3.66	−9.03	
Green	Matthew Piggott	583	1.21	N/A	
People's	James Strange	432	0.89	−4.41	
Total valid votes/expense limit		48,298	99.36	—	126,105.96
Total rejected ballots		311	0.64		
Turnout		48,609	72.72		
Eligible voters		66,847			
Conservative hold		Swing		−9.76	
Source: Elections Canada
Note: number of eligible voters does not include voting day registrations.

2021 federal election redistributed results
Party	Vote	%
Conservative	20,634	51.31
Liberal	12,342	30.69
New Democratic	5,104	12.69
People's	2,133	5.30

=== West Nova ===
Graph of election results in West Nova (minor parties that never got 2% of the vote or didn't run consistently are omitted) View source data.

==== 2021 ====
2021 Canadian federal election: West Nova
Party	Candidate	Votes	%	±%	Expenditures
Conservative	Chris d'Entremont	22,104	50.38	+11.09	$84,677.20
Liberal	Alxys Chamberlain	13,732	31.30	-5.08	$58,947.58
New Democratic	Cheryl Burbidge	5,645	12.87	+2.16	$2,097.31
People's	Scott Spidle	2,390	5.45	–	$977.39
Total valid votes/expense limit		43,871	99.36	–	$111,398.28
Total rejected ballots		284	0.64	-0.44	
Turnout		44,155	62.35	-5.10	
Registered voters		70,823			
Conservative hold		Swing		+8.08	
Source: Elections Canada

==== 2019 ====
2019 Canadian federal election: West Nova
Party	Candidate	Votes	%	±%	Expenditures
Conservative	Chris d'Entremont	18,390	39.30	+13.21	$72,015.22
Liberal	Jason Deveau	17,025	36.38	−26.61	$53,630.92
Green	Judy N. Green	5,939	12.69	+8.52	$12,854.70
New Democratic	Matthew Dubois	5,010	10.71	+3.96	$6,668.83
Veterans Coalition	Gloria Jane Cook	434	0.93	New	none listed
Total valid votes/expense limit		46,798	98.92		$105,785.41
Total rejected ballots		512	1.08	+0.49	
Turnout		47,310	67.45	−1.34	
Eligible voters		70,143			
Conservative gain from Liberal		Swing		+19.91	
Source: Elections Canada

==== 2015 ====
2015 Canadian federal election: West Nova
Party	Candidate	Votes	%	±%	Expenditures
Liberal	Colin Fraser	28,775	62.99	+26.60	$87,337.64
Conservative	Arnold LeBlanc	11,916	26.09	–20.95	$41,005.69
New Democratic	Greg Foster	3,084	6.75	–6.36	$25,617.41
Green	Clark Walton	1,904	4.17	+0.71	$2,291.24
Total valid votes/expense limit		45,679	100.00		$210,111.37
Total rejected ballots		271	0.59		
Turnout		45,950	68.79		
Eligible voters		66,796			
Liberal gain from Conservative		Swing		+23.78	
Source: Elections Canada

==== 2011 ====
2011 Canadian federal election: West Nova
Party	Candidate	Votes	%	±%	Expenditures
Conservative	Greg Kerr	20,204	47.04	+7.10	$82,563.21
Liberal	Robert Thibault	15,632	36.39	+0.24	$62,177.30
New Democratic	George Barron	5,631	13.11	-3.78	$12,244.90
Green	Ross Johnson	1,487	3.46	-1.55	none listed
Total valid votes/expense limit		42,954	100.0		$86,810.95
Total rejected, unmarked and declined ballots		356	0.82	+0.10	
Turnout		43,310	63.75	+1.27	
Eligible voters		67,938			
Conservative hold		Swing		+3.43	

==== 2008 ====
2008 Canadian federal election: West Nova
Party	Candidate	Votes	%	±%	Expenditures
Conservative	Greg Kerr	16,779	39.94	+1.83	$69,467.56
Liberal	Robert Thibault	15,185	36.15	-3.09	$57,096.02
New Democratic	George Barron	7,097	16.89	-1.95	$12,741.38
Green	Ronald Mills	2,106	5.01	+2.71	$123.04
Independent	Cindy M. Nesbitt	844	2.01	–	$10,570.22
Total valid votes/expense limit		42,011	100.0		$83,932
Total rejected, unmarked and declined ballots		304	0.72	+0.12	
Turnout		42,315	62.48	-1.20	
Eligible voters		67,722			
Conservative gain from Liberal		Swing		+2.46	

==== 2006 ====
2006 Canadian federal election: West Nova
Party	Candidate	Votes	%	±%	Expenditures
Liberal	Robert Thibault	17,734	39.24	-3.42	$53,606.19
Conservative	Greg Kerr	17,222	38.11	+5.06	$54,945.96
New Democratic	Arthur Bull	8,512	18.84	-2.29	$25,148.83
Green	Matthew Granger	1,040	2.30	-0.92	$74.10
Independent	Ken Griffiths	681	1.51	–	$2,576.48
Total valid votes/expense limit		45,190	100.0		$79,451
Total rejected, unmarked and declined ballots		274	0.60	-0.21	
Turnout		45,464	63.68	-2.26	
Eligible voters		71,393			
Liberal hold		Swing		-4.24	

==== 2004 ====
2004 Canadian federal election: West Nova
Party	Candidate	Votes	%	±%	Expenditures
Liberal	Robert Thibault	18,343	42.66	+8.06	$48,703.53
Conservative	Jon Carey	14,209	33.05	-20.44	$70,393.83
New Democratic	Arthur Bull	9,086	21.13	+9.67	$24,310.23
Green	Matthew Granger	1,385	3.22	–	none listed
Total valid votes/expense limit		42,996	100.0		$76,207
Total rejected, unmarked and declined ballots		352	0.81		
Turnout		43,348	65.94	+1.04	
Eligible voters		65,736			
Liberal notional gain from Progressive Conservative		Swing		+14.25	
Changes from 2000 are based on redistributed results. Change for the Conservative Party is based on the combined totals of the Progressive Conservative Party and the Canadian Alliance.

2000 federal election redistributed results
Party	Vote	%
Progressive Conservative	15,154	35.52
Liberal	14,760	34.60
Alliance	7,667	17.97
New Democratic	4,887	11.46
Others	193	0.45

==== 2000 ====
2000 Canadian federal election: West Nova
Party	Candidate	Votes	%	±%	Expenditures
Liberal	Robert Thibault	12,783	36.09	+10.39	$57,653
Progressive Conservative	Mark Muise	12,080	34.11	-0.20	$34,692
Alliance	Mike Donaldson	6,581	18.58	-0.23	$32,417
New Democratic	Phil Roberts	3,976	11.23	-9.23	$14,118
Total valid votes		35,420	100.00		
Total rejected, unmarked and declined ballots		235	0.66		
Turnout		35,655	67.98	-5.95	
Eligible voters		52,453			

Results for the Canadian Alliance from 1997 are based on the results of its predecessor, the Reform Party.

==== 1997 ====
1997 Canadian federal election: West Nova
Party	Candidate	Votes	%	±%	Expenditures
Progressive Conservative	Mark Muise	13,187	34.31	+11.64	$37,592
Liberal	Harry Verran	9,877	25.70	-29.19	$47,082
New Democratic	Brian Noble	7,862	20.46	+14.87	$4,426
Reform	Betty Cox	7,229	18.81	+3.66	$25,210
Natural Law	Neeraj Lakhanpal	275	0.72	-0.98	$0.00
Total valid votes		38,430	100.00		
Total rejected, unmarked and declined ballots		338	0,87		
Turnout		38,768	73.93		
Eligible voters		52,441			

=== South West Nova ===
Graph of election results in South West Nova (minor parties that never got 2% of the vote or didn't run consistently are omitted) View source data.

==== 1993 ====
1993 Canadian federal election: West Nova
Party	Candidate	Votes	%	±%
Liberal	Harry Verran	20,530	54.89	+4.88
Progressive Conservative	Yvon Joseph Thibault	8,478	22.67	-18.84
Reform	Louis Mason	5,667	15.15	
New Democratic	Peter Zavitz	2,090	5.59	-0.10
Natural Law	Gregg Murphy	636	1.70	
Total valid votes		37,401	100.00	

==== 1988 ====
1988 Canadian federal election: West Nova
Party	Candidate	Votes	%	±%
Liberal	Coline Campbell	21,062	50.01	+8.16
Progressive Conservative	Gerald Comeau	17,482	41.51	-9.08
New Democratic	Peter Zavitz	2,396	5.69	-1.86
Christian Heritage	Angus M. McLean	1,172	2.78	
Total valid votes		42,112	100.00	

==== 1984 ====
1984 Canadian federal election: West Nova
Party	Candidate	Votes	%	±%
Progressive Conservative	Gerald Comeau	20,604	50.59	+13.78
Liberal	Coline Campbell	17,044	41.85	-7.97
New Democratic	Bob Ritchie	3,076	7.55	-5.25
Total valid votes		40,724	100.00	

==== 1980 ====
1980 Canadian federal election: West Nova
Party	Candidate	Votes	%	±%
Liberal	Coline Campbell	19,151	49.82	+5.65
Progressive Conservative	Charles Haliburton	14,151	36.81	-7.66
New Democratic	John Lee	4,922	12.80	+1.44
Independent	Anne Trudell	216	0.56	
Total valid votes		38,440	100.00	
lop.parl.ca

==== 1979 ====
1979 Canadian federal election: West Nova
Party	Candidate	Votes	%	±%
Progressive Conservative	Charles Haliburton	16,512	44.47	-0.64
Liberal	Coline Campbell	16,398	44.17	-4.93
New Democratic	Ian MacPherson	4,217	11.36	+6.11
Total valid votes		37,127	100.00	

=== South Western Nova ===
Graph of election results in South Western Nova (minor parties that never got 2% of the vote or didn't run consistently are omitted) View source data.

==== 1974 ====
1974 Canadian federal election: West Nova
Party	Candidate	Votes	%	±%
Liberal	Coline Campbell	15,066	49.10	7.49
Progressive Conservative	Charles Haliburton	13,841	45.11	-5.07
New Democratic	Yvonne Coe	1,610	5.25	-1.77
Social Credit	Cecilia Zwicker	164	0.53	-0.67
Total valid votes		30,681	100.00	

==== 1972 ====
1972 Canadian federal election: West Nova
Party	Candidate	Votes	%	±%
Progressive Conservative	Charles Haliburton	15,039	50.18	-2.15
Liberal	Fulton Logan	12,471	41.61	-2.61
New Democratic	Lawrence Meuse	2,104	7.02	+4.66
Social Credit	Charles Paddock	359	1.20	
Total valid votes		29,973	100.00	

==== 1968 ====
1968 Canadian federal election: West Nova
Party	Candidate	Votes	%
Progressive Conservative	Louis-Roland Comeau	14,543	52.33
Liberal	John Stewart	12,290	44.22
New Democratic	Rae Gilman	655	2.36
Independent PC	N. Evan Atkinson	293	1.05
Total valid votes		27,791	100.00

== See also ==
- List of Canadian electoral districts
- Historical federal electoral districts of Canada

== Sources ==
- "Acadie—Annapolis (Code 12011) Census Profile". 2011 census. Government of Canada - Statistics Canada.
- Riding history for South West Nova (1976–1996) from the Library of Parliament
- Riding history for West Nova (1996–1998) from the Library of Parliament
- Riding history for West Nova (1998–2003) from the Library of Parliament
- Riding history for West Nova (2003– ) from the Library of Parliament
- results
