= Harry Verran =

Canadian politician

Member of Parliament for South West Nova
- In office 25 October 1993 – 2 June 1997
- Preceded by: Coline Campbell
- Succeeded by: Mark Muise

Personal details
- Born: 6 July 1930 Placentia, Newfoundland
- Died: 18 October 2015 (aged 85) Meadowvale, Nova Scotia
- Party: Liberal
- Profession: Businessman, photographer, sailor

Harry James Verran (6 July 1930 – 18 October 2015) was a Canadian politician and member of the House of Commons of Canada for South West Nova from 1993 to 1997. By career, he was a businessman, photographer and sailor.

== Early life ==
Verran was born in Placentia, Newfoundland to James Placidious Verran and Mary Josephine Byrne. In 1949, he joined the Royal Canadian Navy and served for twenty years. As a photographer, he served on HMCS Bonaventure and HMCS Magnificent.

== Political career ==
Verran won the South West Nova electoral district for the Liberal party in the 1993 federal election during the Liberals large majority government. He was able to win the district as a Liberal in part due to his socially conservative views, including campaigning against same-sex marriage. In the 1997 federal election, he campaigned in the West Nova riding but was defeated by Progressive Conservative candidate Mark Muise.

Verran died on 18 October 2015.

== Electoral record ==
1997 Canadian federal election: West Nova
Party	Candidate	Votes	%	±%	Expenditures
Progressive Conservative	Mark Muise	13,187	34.31	+11.64	$37,592
Liberal	Harry Verran	9,877	25.70	-29.19	$47,082
New Democratic	Brian Noble	7,862	20.46	+14.87	$4,426
Reform	Betty Cox	7,229	18.81	+3.66	$25,210
Natural Law	Neeraj Lakhanpal	275	0.72	-0.98	$0.00
Total valid votes		38,430	100.00		
Total rejected, unmarked and declined ballots		338	0,87		
Turnout		38,768	73.93		
Eligible voters		52,441			

1993 Canadian federal election: West Nova
Party	Candidate	Votes	%	±%
Liberal	Harry Verran	20,530	54.89	+4.88
Progressive Conservative	Yvon Joseph Thibault	8,478	22.67	-18.84
Reform	Louis Mason	5,667	15.15	
New Democratic	Peter Zavitz	2,090	5.59	-0.10
Natural Law	Gregg Murphy	636	1.70	
Total valid votes		37,401	100.00	
