= Neil LeBlanc =

Canadian politician

The Honourable Neil LeBlanc ECNS

Member of the Nova Scotia House of Assembly for Argyle
- In office November 6, 1984 – May 25, 1993
- Preceded by: Hugh Tinkham
- Succeeded by: Allister Surette
- In office March 24, 1998 – August 5, 2003
- Preceded by: Allister Surette
- Succeeded by: Chris d'Entremont

Minister of Finance
- In office August 16, 1999 – August 5, 2003
- Preceded by: Don Downe
- Succeeded by: Peter G. Christie

Personal details
- Born: August 8, 1956 (age 69) Wedgeport, Nova Scotia
- Party: Progressive Conservative
- Spouse: Grace LeBlanc
- Occupation: Owner of fish and lobster wholesale company

Neil J. LeBlanc (born August 8, 1956) is a former politician in Nova Scotia, Canada.

== Early life and education ==
He was born in Wedgeport, Nova Scotia to Gladys (Bourque) and Alfred LeBlanc. He graduated from Saint Mary’s University and then for the chartered accounting firm of Peat, Marwick and Mitchell (now KPMG).

== Political career ==
He entered politics in 1984, when he was elected to the Nova Scotia House of Assembly as a Progressive Conservative for the riding of Argyle. LeBlanc after his second election victory in 1988, was named Solicitor General, becoming one of Nova Scotia’s youngest Cabinet Ministers.

In the 1990s, LeBlanc also served as Minister responsible for the Nova Scotia Sport and Recreation Commission and Minister of Government Services.

He lost his seat during the Liberal sweep of 1993, and returned home to establish N. LeBlanc Enterprises Ltd., a fish and lobster wholesale company.

LeBlanc made a successful return to politics in the 1998 election, winning back the seat he lost, five years earlier. Following the election, he was named as the Progressive Conservative House Leader.

He was re-elected in the 1999 election, that saw the Progressive Conservatives under John Hamm form a majority government. He was appointed to the Executive Council of Nova Scotia as Minister of Finance, Minister of Business and Consumer Services, as well as Minister of Acadian Affairs. Along with his cabinet duties, he was also named the minister responsible for Nova Scotia Resources Ltd., Nova Scotia Gaming Corporation, Halifax/Dartmouth Bridge Commission; and President de l’Association des Parlementaire Francais.

In 2002, LeBlanc introduced Nova Scotia’s first balanced budget in 40 years.

In 2003, LeBlanc retired after 14 years as an MLA and eight and a half years as a cabinet minister, to return to Wedgeport to spend more time with his family and to briefly assume duties as Chief Administrative Officer of the Municipality of the District of Argyle.

== Leadership candidacy ==
In 2005, LeBlanc announced his candidacy for the leadership of the Progressive Conservative Party of Nova Scotia. Originally considered a front-runner, LeBlanc finished last on the first ballot, 59 votes behind the leader, Rodney MacDonald, and 12 behind second place finisher, Bill Black. Dropped from the second ballot, LeBlanc endorsed MacDonald, who defeated Black on the decisive ballot.

== After politics ==
On July 13, 2006, LeBlanc was named as Consul General to Boston replacing Stan Keyes.

Following the Progressive Conservative defeat to the New Democratic Party in the 2009 election and the subsequent resignation of Progressive Conservative leader Rodney MacDonald, LeBlanc was touted as a possible contender to replace MacDonald.
