= Chris d'Entremont =

Canadian politician

The Honourable Chris d'Entremont ECNS MP
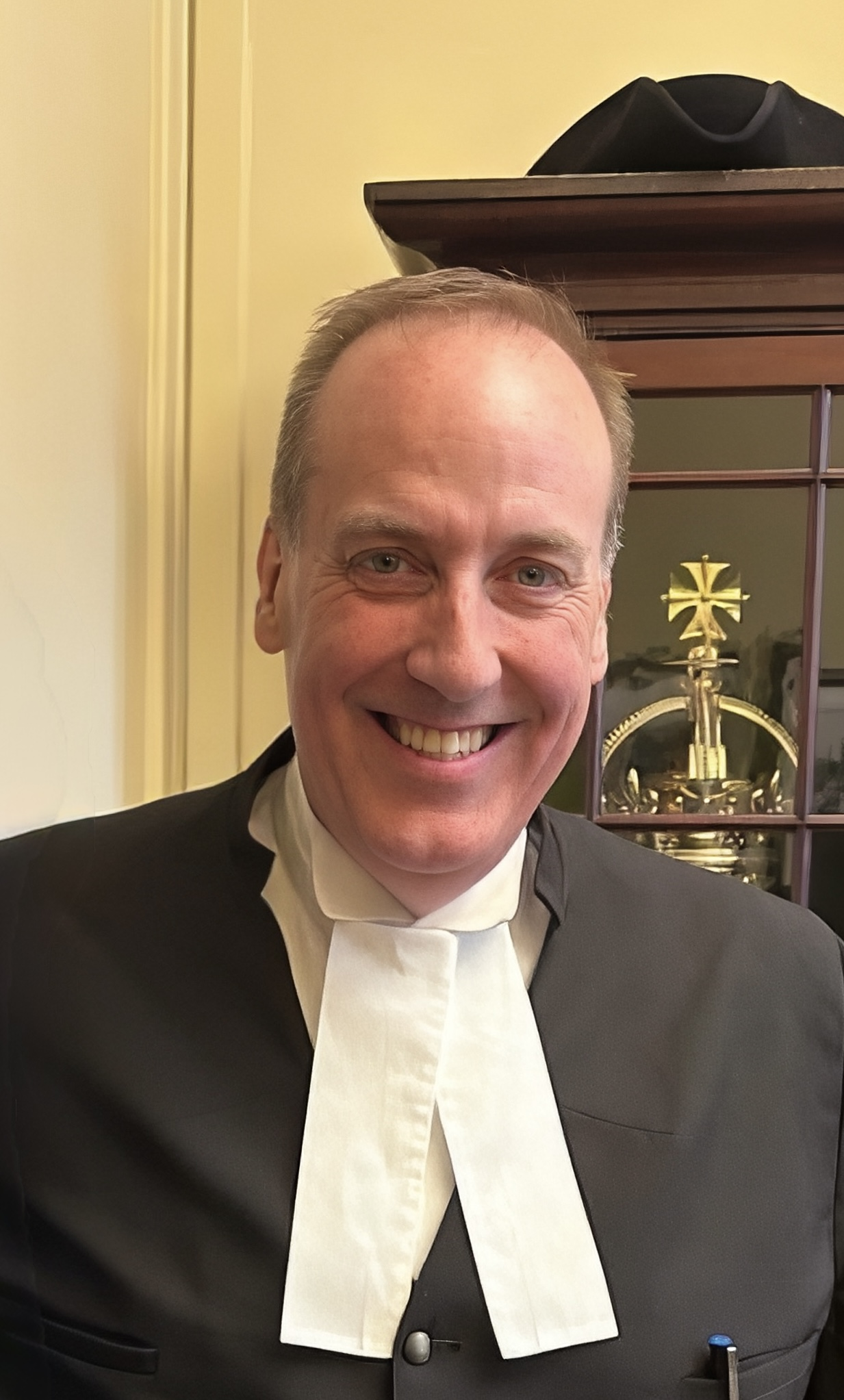
- d’Entremont in 2024

Member of Parliament for Acadie—Annapolis West Nova (2019–2025)
- Incumbent
- Assumed office 21 October 2019
- Preceded by: Colin Fraser

Deputy Speaker of the House of Commons Chair of Committees of the Whole
- In office 24 November 2021 – 28 April 2025
- Preceded by: Bruce Stanton
- Succeeded by: Tom Kmiec

Member of the Nova Scotia House of Assembly for Argyle-Barrington Argyle (2003–2013)
- In office 5 August 2003 – 31 July 2019
- Preceded by: Neil LeBlanc
- Succeeded by: Colton LeBlanc

Personal details
- Born: Christopher André d'Entremont; October 31, 1969 (age 56) Yarmouth, Nova Scotia, Canada
- Party: Liberal (since 2025)
- Other political affiliations: Conservative (2018–2025); Nova Scotia Progressive Conservative (until 2019)
- Occupation: Politician

Christopher André d'Entremont ECNS MP (born 31 October 1969) is a Canadian politician who is the member of Parliament (MP) for Acadie—Annapolis. A member of the Liberal Party, d'Entremont was first elected to represent the riding (then known as West Nova) in 2019 as a Conservative, before crossing the floor in 2025. He represented Argyle-Barrington in the Nova Scotia House of Assembly from 2003 to 2019 as a member of the Nova Scotia Progressive Conservatives and served as a provincial cabinet minister. d'Entremont served as deputy speaker and chair of Committees of the Whole from 2021 to 2025, the first Acadian member to do so.

== Early life and education ==
Born in Yarmouth, Nova Scotia, d'Entremont graduated from Loyalist College with a diploma in radio broadcasting in 1992.

== Before politics ==
Before his election in 2003, d'Entremont worked as an announcer at CJLS-FM. Later, he was employed by TriStar Industries, as an electronics salesperson and then for Camille d'Eon Boatbuilders. He was also a development officer for the South West Shore Development Authority.

== Political career ==
=== Provincial politics ===
d'Entremont was first elected MLA for Argyle in the 2003 election, and re-elected in the 2006, 2009, 2013 and 2017 elections. In August 2003, d'Entremont was appointed to the Executive Council of Nova Scotia as Minister of Agriculture and Fisheries, and Minister of Acadian Affairs. He later served as Minister of Health, Minister of Community Services, Minister responsible for the Youth Secretariat, and Chair of the Senior Citizens' Secretariat. He briefly served as the interim Minister of Finance following the death of Michael Baker in March 2009. Those duties were shifted to Jamie Muir seven days later.

In November 2018, d'Entremont announced he was seeking the Conservative nomination in West Nova for the 2019 federal election. He won the nomination in June 2019. d'Entremont resigned his provincial seat in July 2019.

=== Federal politics ===
On 21 October 2019, d'Entremont was elected as the Member of Parliament in West Nova, defeating Liberal candidate Jason Deveau (the incumbent MP, Liberal Colin Fraser, did not seek re-election). He was the only non-Liberal MP elected from Nova Scotia and representing the easternmost riding among Conservatives elected in the 2019 federal election.

In 2019, Conservative leader Andrew Scheer appointed d'Entremont to be Shadow Minister of Official Languages and a member of the Standing Committee on Official Languages. He served as Shadow Minister for Intergovernmental Affairs in Erin O'Toole's Shadow Cabinet. D'Entremont also sat as a member of the Standing Committee on Health.

On 20 September 2021, d'Entremont was re-elected as the MP for West Nova, defeating Liberal challenger Alxys Chamberlain by almost 20 percentage points. He was appointed as deputy speaker in November.

On 28 April 2025, he won re-election in the newly renamed Acadie—Annapolis riding against former provincial Liberal MLA Ronnie LeBlanc. He was the sole member of his party to win a federal riding in Nova Scotia in the 2025 election. On 4 November 2025, he left the Conservative Party and crossed the floor to join the Liberals in support of Prime Minister Mark Carney's government, citing issues with the leadership of Conservative Party leader Pierre Poilievre. This decision sparked passionate responses from constituents and other members of Parliament. d'Entremont's party crossing came shortly after the tabling of budget 2025, and with his crossing, the Liberal minority government became two seats away from forming a majority government. Shortly after the floor crossing the Royal Canadian Mounted Police launched an investigation into online threats made against d'Entremont.

At the time of the 2025 Canadian federal election, he lived in Tusket, Nova Scotia.

== Electoral record ==
=== Federal ===
2025 Canadian federal election: Acadie—Annapolis
Party	Candidate	Votes	%	±%	Expenditures
Conservative	Chris d'Entremont	23,024	47.67	−3.64	
Liberal	Ronnie LeBlanc	22,491	46.57	+15.88	
New Democratic	Ingrid Deon	1,768	3.66	−9.03	
Green	Matthew Piggott	583	1.21	N/A	
People's	James Strange	432	0.89	−4.41	
Total valid votes/expense limit		48,298	99.36	—	126,105.96
Total rejected ballots		311	0.64		
Turnout		48,609	72.72		
Eligible voters		66,847			
Conservative hold		Swing		−9.76	
Source: Elections Canada
Note: number of eligible voters does not include voting day registrations.

2021 Canadian federal election: West Nova
Party	Candidate	Votes	%	±%	Expenditures
Conservative	Chris d'Entremont	22,104	50.38	+11.09	$84,677.20
Liberal	Alxys Chamberlain	13,732	31.30	-5.08	$58,947.58
New Democratic	Cheryl Burbidge	5,645	12.87	+2.16	$2,097.31
People's	Scott Spidle	2,390	5.45	–	$977.39
Total valid votes/expense limit		43,871	99.36	–	$111,398.28
Total rejected ballots		284	0.64	-0.44	
Turnout		44,155	62.35	-5.10	
Registered voters		70,823			
Conservative hold		Swing		+8.08	
Source: Elections Canada

2019 Canadian federal election: West Nova
Party	Candidate	Votes	%	±%	Expenditures
Conservative	Chris d'Entremont	18,390	39.30	+13.21	$72,015.22
Liberal	Jason Deveau	17,025	36.38	−26.61	$53,630.92
Green	Judy N. Green	5,939	12.69	+8.52	$12,854.70
New Democratic	Matthew Dubois	5,010	10.71	+3.96	$6,668.83
Veterans Coalition	Gloria Jane Cook	434	0.93	New	none listed
Total valid votes/expense limit		46,798	98.92		$105,785.41
Total rejected ballots		512	1.08	+0.49	
Turnout		47,310	67.45	−1.34	
Eligible voters		70,143			
Conservative gain from Liberal		Swing		+19.91	
Source: Elections Canada

=== Provincial ===
2017 Nova Scotia general election
Party	Candidate	Votes	%	±%
Progressive Conservative	Chris d'Entremont	4,031	65.08	+10.39
Liberal	Louis d'Entremont	1,840	29.71	-10.67
New Democratic Party	Greg Foster	323	5.21	+0.28

2013 Nova Scotia general election
Party	Candidate	Votes	%	±%
Progressive Conservative	Chris d'Entremont	3,935	54.69	-9.45
Liberal	Kent Blades	2,905	40.38	+23.49
New Democratic Party	Kenn Baynton	355	4.93	-12.35

2009 Nova Scotia general election
Party	Candidate	Votes	%	±%
Progressive Conservative	Chris d'Entremont	2,817	64.14	-3.51
New Democratic Party	Melvin Huskins	759	17.28	+5.90
Liberal	Lionel Leblanc	742	16.89	-2.67
Green	Barb Lake	74	1.68	+0.27

2006 Nova Scotia general election
Party	Candidate	Votes	%	±%
Progressive Conservative	Chris d'Entremont	3,158	67.65	+19.70
Liberal	Christian Surette	913	19.56	-20.33
New Democratic Party	Charles Muise	531	11.38	-0.79
Green	Patty Doucet-Saunders	66	1.41	Ø

2003 Nova Scotia general election
Party	Candidate	Votes	%	±%
Progressive Conservative	Chris d'Entremont	2,345	47.95	-29.06
Liberal	Aldric Benoit d'Entremont	1,951	39.89	+24.34
New Democratic Party	Charles Muise	595	12.17	+5.66
