= Digby, Nova Scotia =

Digby
- Town
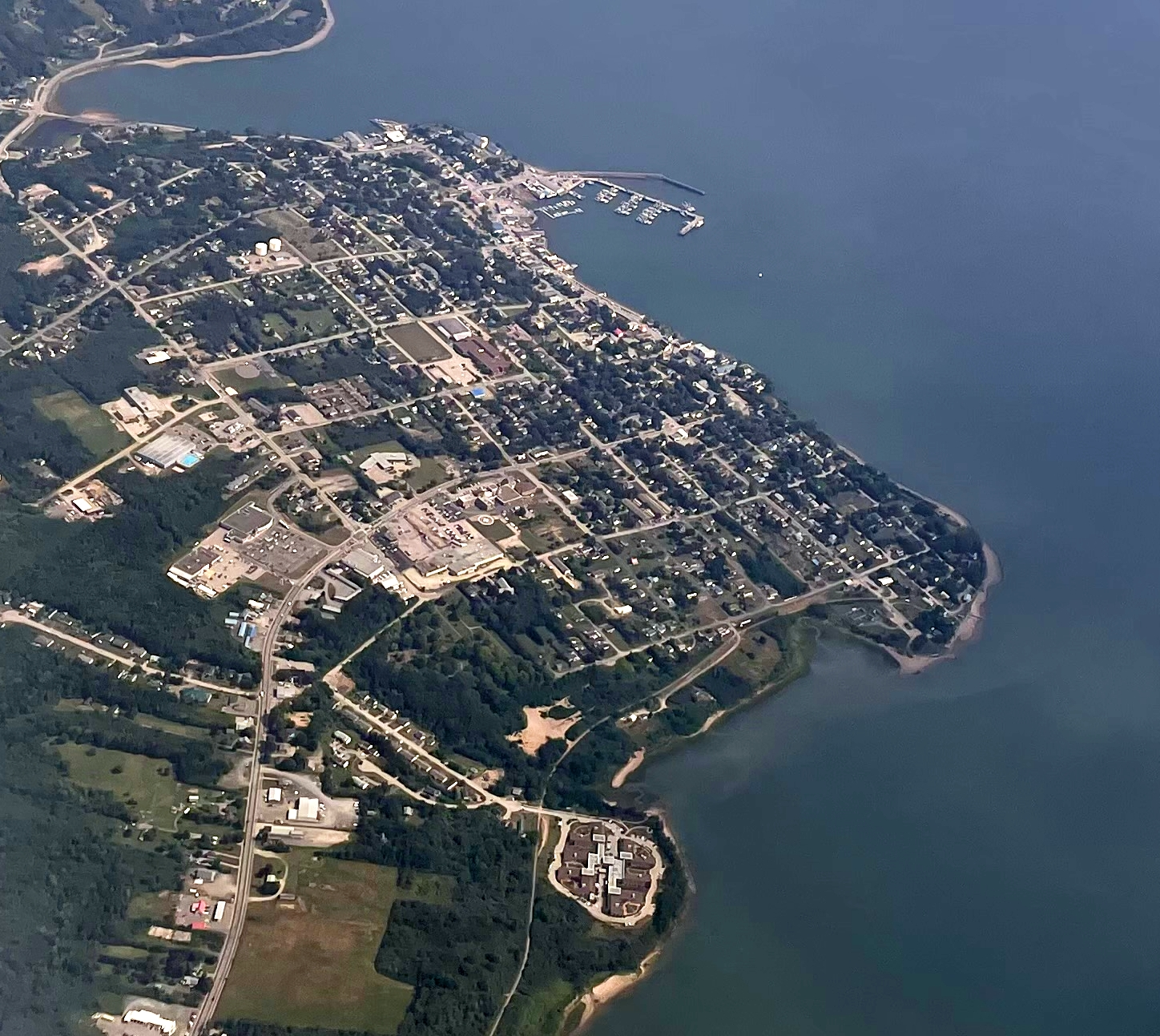
- An aerial view of Digby

- Seal
- Nickname: "The Scallop Capital of The World"
- Location of Digby, Nova Scotia
- Coordinates: 44°37′20″N 65°45′38″W
- Country: Canada
- Province: Nova Scotia
- County: Digby
- Founded: June 1783
- Incorporated: February 25, 1890
- Electoral Districts Federal: Acadie—Annapolis
- Provincial: Digby—Annapolis

Government
  - Type: Town Council
  - Mayor: Mike Bartlett
  - Governing Body: Digby Town Council
  - MLA: Jill Balser (PC)
  - MP: Chris d'Entremont (L)

Area (2021)
  - Total: 3.16 km^{2} (1.22 sq mi)
- Highest elevation: 152 m (499 ft)
- Lowest elevation: 0 m (0 ft)

Population (2021)
  - Total: 2,001
  - Density: 634/km^{2} (1,640/sq mi)
  - Change (2016-21): ▼2.9%
  - Dwellings: 1,133 (1,030 occupied)
- Demonym: Digbyite
- Time zone: UTC-4 (AST)
  - Summer (DST): UTC-3 (ADT)
- Canadian Postal code: B0V 1A0
- Area code: 902
- Telephone Exchange: 245
- Median Earnings*: 43,200
- Website: www.digby.ca
- Median household income, 2020 (all households)

Digby is a Canadian town in southwestern Nova Scotia. It is in the historical county of Digby and a separate municipality from the Municipality of the District of Digby. The town is situated on the western shore of the Annapolis Basin near the entrance to the Digby Gut, which connects the basin to the Bay of Fundy.

Named after Admiral Robert Digby, the town has a scallop fishing fleet. The MV Fundy Rose ferry service connects the town to Saint John, New Brunswick.

== History ==
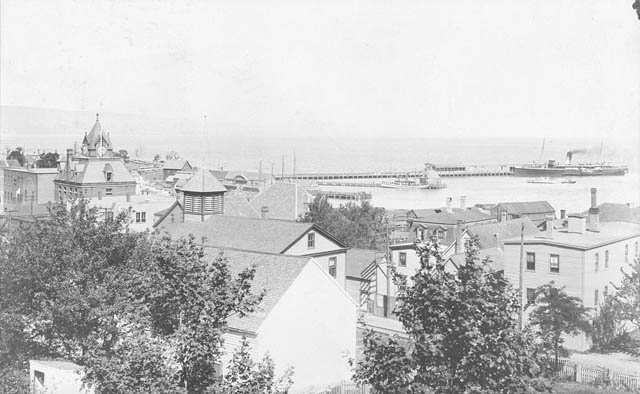
Digby in 1906.

Digby is called Oositookun, meaning ear of land, by the Mi'kmaq. A small group of New England Planters settled in the area of the town in the 1760s naming it Conway. However Digby was formally settled and surveyed as a town in June 1783 by the United Empire Loyalists under the leadership of Sir Robert Digby.

The town developed a sizable shipping fleet in the 19th century. One famous Digby vessel was the brigantine Dei Gratia, which discovered the famous mystery ship Mary Celeste in 1872. The town became an important regional transportation centre in the 1890s with the arrival of the Dominion Atlantic Railway. Trains connected with a series of steamships such as the City of Monticello and later the SS Princess Helene.

Digby's history is preserved and interpreted by the Admiral Digby Museum, located facing the harbour in the historic Woodrow/Dakin home, one of oldest houses in the town.

== Tourism ==
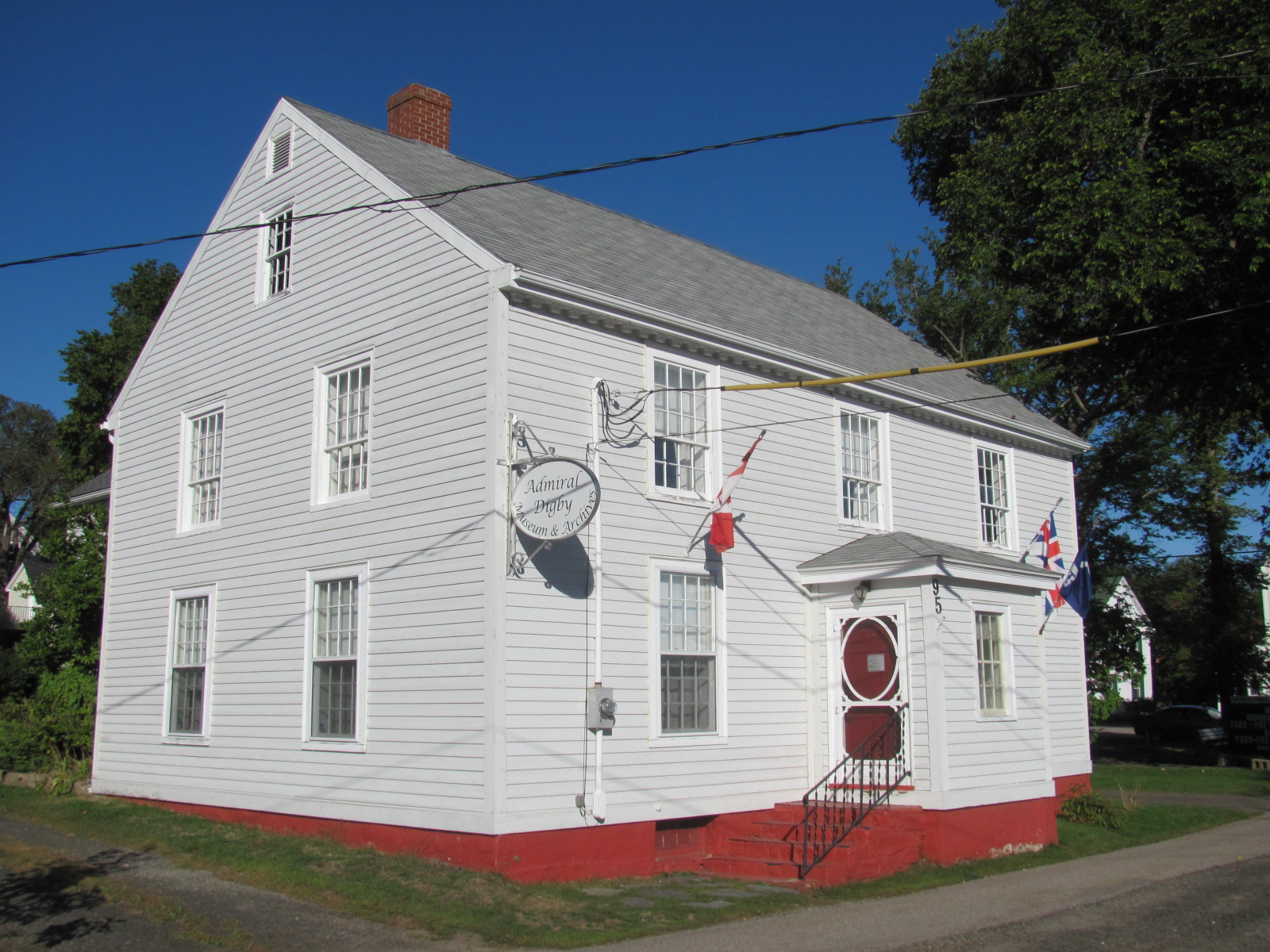
The Admiral Digby Museum.

Tourism has played an important role in Digby during the 20th century beginning with the establishment of railway and steamship links that opened the town and surrounding communities as an-easy-to-reach destination for larger urban centres in eastern North America. A landmark in this industry was the construction of the Digby Pines Resort on the town's outskirts. Built in 1905 and then purchased in 1917 by the Dominion Atlantic Railway, the resort provided a focal point to the local tourism industry with a large expansion in 1927. The Pines attracted notable visitors including early film star Theda Bara who spent her honeymoon there in 1921. Expanded several times since, it was bought by the Government of Nova Scotia after the Dominion Atlantic sold its hotels. About 20 additional motels, inns and bed and breakfast operations are based in Digby making tourism an important employer.

The annual Scallop Days Festival, held the first week of August, brings the fishing and tourism industries together to showcase the town's history and heritage to the tourists. The festival offers a variety of themed activities for all ages, including scallop shucking contests, a parade, and an exhibition of local artists.

=== Wharf Rat Rally ===
Since 2004, Digby has become the destination of the largest motorcycle rally in Atlantic Canada, the annual Wharf Rat Rally. It attracts many times the town's population; the town of 2,000 residents grows to 50,000 people, including 25,000 motorcycles. So many that schools and some roads have to close for the day due to crowds and motorcycle traffic. The Wharf Rat Rally event is held the weekend of Labour Day in August/September each year.

== Fishing ==
Fishing has been an essential economic activity since the town's settlement. Digby's schooner fishery reached its peak in the early 1900s, documented by Frederick William Wallace. Later, trawlers, especially those harvesting scallops became the mainstay.

== Government ==
The town council consists of a mayor and four councillors. The offices of Digby County are located immediately adjacent to the town. Digby is represented provincially by the riding of Digby-Annapolis and federally by the riding of West Nova. Numerous provincial and federal services for the county and western Nova Scotia such Access Nova Scotia and the Department of Community and Social Services are located in Digby.

== Amenities ==
There is a Royal Canadian Mounted Police (RCMP) station located on Victoria Street.

The Digby General Hospital, located on Warwick Street, provides medical care to the residents of Digby. This includes Emergency Care, Primary Care, Inpatient Care, Restorative Care, Ambulatory Care, Day Surgery, Renal Dialysis. Although they provide emergency care, the Emergency Room does close occasionally due to a lack of physician or nursing coverage. During closures, patients are advised to go to the nearest hospital (Yarmouth or Kentville). As of March 2024, the base cost for a visit to the Emergency Room at the hospital for a non-Canadian visitor is $897.50 Canadian; that fee excludes any doctor's fees, tests, or medicines. Similar charges apply in other hospitals and clinics.

== Geography ==
Digby is located approximately 105 km (65 mi) from Yarmouth, and about 230 km (140 mi) from Downtown Halifax.

== Demographics ==
Historical population
Year	Pop.	±%
1901	1,150	—
1911	1,247	+8.4%
1921	1,230	−1.4%
1931	1,412	+14.8%
1941	1,657	+17.4%
1951	2,047	+23.5%
1956	2,145	+4.8%
1961	2,308	+7.6%
1981	2,558	+10.8%
1986	2,525	−1.3%
1991	2,311	−8.5%
1996	2,199	−4.8%
2001	2,111	−4.0%
2006	2,092	−0.9%
2011	2,152	+2.9%
2016	2,060	−4.3%
2021	2,001	−2.9%

In the 2021 Census of Population conducted by Statistics Canada, Digby had a population of 2,001 living in 1,030 of its 1,133 total private dwellings, a change of −2.9% from its 2016 population of 2,060. With a land area of 3.16 km^{2} (1.22 sq mi), it had a population density of 633.2/km^{2} (1,640.1/sq mi) in 2021.

== See also ==
- List of municipalities in Nova Scotia
