= List of museums in Nova Scotia =

This list of museums in Nova Scotia, Canada contains museums which are defined for this context as institutions (including nonprofit organizations, government entities, and private businesses) that collect and care for objects of cultural, artistic, scientific, or historical interest and make their collections or related exhibits available for public viewing. Also included are non-profit art galleries and university art galleries. Museums that exist only in cyberspace (i.e., virtual museums) are not included.

On February 24, 2026, citing low attendance and changing visitor expectations, the provincial government made the decision to close 12 sites: Cossit House, Lawrence House, McCulloch House, Perkins House, Prescott House, Ross-Thomson House, Shand House, Barrington Woolen Mill, Sutherland Steam Mill, Wile Carding Mill, Fisherman’s Life Museum and North Hills Museum.

Name	Town/City	County	Region	Type	Summary
Acadia University Art Gallery	Wolfville	Kings	Annapolis Valley	Art	website, located in the Beveridge Arts Centre
Acadian House Museum	West Chezzetcook	Halifax Regional Municipality	Eastern Shore	History	Local history, period room displays
Acadian Museum	Chéticamp	Inverness	Cape Breton Island	History	Local history and Acadian culture
Admiral Digby Museum	Digby	Digby	Southern Nova Scotia	History	Historic house with 19th-century-period rooms, local maritime and cultural history displays, clothing and children's items
Africville Museum	Halifax	Halifax Regional Municipality	Metro Halifax	History	website, Museum about the Africville community that was situated on the northern shore of Halifax Harbour until the 1960s
Age of Sail Heritage Centre	Port Greville	Cumberland	Fundy Shore	Maritime	www.ageofsailmuseum.ca Area's shipbuilding and lumbering heritage
Alderney Landing	Dartmouth	Halifax Regional Municipality	Metro Halifax	Art	Includes an art gallery
Alexander Graham Bell National Historic Site	Baddeck	Victoria	Cape Breton Island	Biographical	Life and works of inventor Alexander Graham Bell
Amos Seaman School Museum	Minudie	Cumberland	Fundy Shore	History	Local history exhibits in a former one room schoolhouse
An Drochaid Museum	Mabou	Inverness	Cape Breton Island	History	Local history and Gaelic culture, also known as the Bridge Museum
Anna Leonowens Gallery	Halifax	Halifax Regional Municipality	Metro Halifax	Art	website, part of the Nova Scotia College of Art and Design University, three galleries with exhibitions of contemporary studio and media art, craft and design
Annapolis Valley Macdonald Museum	Middleton	Annapolis	Annapolis Valley	Multiple	website, local history, Nova Scotia Museum's clock and pocket watch collection, art gallery, 1940s general store and early 20th-century schoolroom displays, operated by the Annapolis Valley Historical Society
Anne Murray Centre	Springhill	Cumberland	Fundy Shore	Biographical	Life of singer Anne Murray
Antigonish Heritage Museum	Antigonish	Antigonish	Northumberland Shore	History	website, local history
Apple Capital Museum	Berwick	Kings	Annapolis Valley	History	Local history and area apple industry
Archelaus Smith Museum	Centreville	Shelburne	Southern Nova Scotia	History	Local history and culture of Cape Sable Island, life of Archelaus Smith
Argyle Township Court House & Gaol	Argyle	Yarmouth	Southwestern Nova Scotia	Prison	website, restored 19th-century courthouse and jail
Art Gallery of Nova Scotia	Halifax	Halifax Regional Municipality	Metro Halifax	Art	Includes house and folk art by Maud Lewis
Art Gallery of Nova Scotia	Yarmouth	Yarmouth	Southwestern Nova Scotia	Art	Western branch
Atlantic Canada Aviation Museum	Enfield	Halifax Regional Municipality	Metro Halifax	Aviation	Atlantic Canada's aviation heritage
Avon Heritage Museum	Avondale	Hants	Fundy Shore	Multiple	website, local maritime history, New England Planters, local house histories, family histories and Avon River ecology; operated by the Avon River Heritage Society
Baird's Tradesmen Museum	Aspen	Guysborough	Eastern Shore	History	Antique tools from different trades
Balmoral Grist Mill Museum	Balmoral Mills	Colchester	Northumberland Shore	Mill	Water-powered grist mill, part of the Nova Scotia Museum
Bangor Sawmill Museum	Bangor	Digby	Southern Nova Scotia	Technology	Restored 19th-century water-powered turbine lumber sawmill. Destroyed by fire in 2024.
Barney's River Station School Museum	Barney's River Station	Pictou	Northumberland Shore	Education	website, typical one room school
Bass River Heritage Museum	Bass River	Colchester	Fundy Shore	History	website, local history, period room displays
Bear River Heritage Museum	Bear River	Annapolis	Annapolis Valley	History	website, local history, operated by the Bear River Historical Society
Black Cultural Centre for Nova Scotia	Cherry Brook	Halifax Regional Municipality	Metro Halifax	Ethnic	Black Nova Scotian history and culture
Black Loyalist Heritage Centre	Shelburne	Shelburne	Southern Nova Scotia	Ethnic	website, local history of the Black Loyalists
Blair House Museum	Kentville	Kings	Annapolis Valley	History	Area agriculture industry and local history
Blue Beach Fossil Museum	Hantsport	Hants	Fundy Shore	Natural history	website, fossil tetrapods, fish, invertebrates and plants
Canadian Museum of Immigration at Pier 21	Halifax	Halifax Regional Municipality	Metro Halifax	History	Canadian immigration experience, located at a historic immigration entry point
Canso Islands National Historic Site	Canso	Guysborough	Eastern Shore	History	website, information, visitor center exhibits about local history and history of Grassy Island Fort
Canning Heritage Centre	Canning	Kings	Annapolis Valley	History	website, local history, memorabilia and artifacts of country singer Wilf Carter, operated by the Fieldwood Heritage Society
Cape Breton Fossil Centre	Sydney Mines	Cape Breton	Cape Breton Island	Natural history	website, plant fossils from the Sydney coal field
Cape Breton Centre for Heritage and Science	Sydney	Cape Breton	Cape Breton Island	History	website, operated by the Old Sydney Society, local history
Cape Breton Highlanders Museum	Sydney	Cape Breton	Cape Breton Island	Military	website, history of the 2nd Battalion, Nova Scotia Highlanders
Cape Breton Miners Museum	Glace Bay	Cape Breton	Cape Breton Island	Mining	website, coal mining, mining village and underground tour of the Ocean Deeps Colliery
Cape Breton University Art Gallery	Sydney	Cape Breton	Cape Breton Island	Art	website, located in the Student, Culture and Heritage Centre
Cape Forchu Lighthouse	Cape Forchu	Yarmouth	Southwestern Nova Scotia	Maritime	Museum in the lighthouse keeper's quarters
Cape George Heritage School House	Cape George	Antigonish	Cape George	History	Historic school house displaying artifacts from life in a fishing community.
Carmichael Stewart House Museum	New Glasgow	Pictou	Northumberland Shore	History	Historic house with local history and antiques displays
Celtic Music Interpretive Centre	Judique	Inverness	Cape Breton Island	Music	website
Chapel Hill Museum	Shag Harbour	Shelburne	Southern Nova Scotia	History	Local history, located in a historic church building
Charles Macdonald Concrete House Museum	Centreville	Kings	Annapolis Valley	Art	Art and home of Nova Scotia artist Charles Macdonald
Chestico Museum	Port Hood	Inverness	Cape Breton Island	History	website, local history
Churchill House	Hantsport	Hants	Fundy Shore	Historic house	19th-century Victorian period house
Colchester Historeum	Truro	Colchester	Fundy Shore	History	website, local history, operated by the Colchester Historical Society
Cole Harbour Heritage Farm	Cole Harbour	Halifax Regional Municipality	Metro Halifax	Agriculture	website, historic working farm museum, farmhouse with household artifacts from three centuries, farm machinery
Cornwallis Military Museum	Clementsport	Annapolis	Annapolis Valley	Military	website, history of the CFB Cornwallis
Cossit House	Sydney	Cape Breton	Cape Breton Island	Historic house	website, part of the Nova Scotia Museum, 18th-century period house with costumed guides, operated by the Old Sydney Society
Creamery Square Heritage Centre	Tatamagouche	Colchester	Northumberland Shore	Multiple	website, includes Giantess Anna Swan Museum, Sunrise Trail Museum with local history and culture exhibits, Brule fossils exhibit of conifers and footprints of amphibians and reptiles older than the dinosaurs, and a creamery exhibit
Crombie House	New Glasgow	Pictou	Northumberland Shore	Art	website, display of 19th- and 20th-century Canadian art, paintings by Cornelius Krieghoff, the Group of Seven (artists) and their contemporaries
Cumberland County Museum	Amherst	Cumberland	Northumberland Shore	Multiple	website, industrial and social history of Cumberland County, art exhibits
Dalhousie Arts Centre	Halifax	Halifax Regional Municipality	Metro Halifax	Art	Part of Dalhousie University, includes a contemporary art gallery
Dartmouth Heritage Museum	Dartmouth	Halifax Regional Municipality	Metro Halifax	Historic house	website, operates the late 18th-century Quaker House with whaling ties, and the Victorian period Evergreen House
Debert Military Museum	Debert	Colchester	Fundy Shore	Military	Military artifacts and history of CFS Debert
deGarthe Gallery	Peggys Cove	Halifax Regional Municipality	Eastern Shore	Art	Works by and home of painter and sculptor William E. deGarthe
DesBrisay Museum	Bridgewater	Lunenburg	Southern Nova Scotia	History	Local history
Discovery Centre	Halifax	Halifax Regional Municipality	Metro Halifax	Science	
Dory Shop Museum	Shelburne	Shelburne	Southern Nova Scotia	Maritime	website, part of the Nova Scotia Museum, dory shop
East Hants Historical Society Museum	Selma	Hants	Fundy Shore	History	website, local history, also known as the Lower Selma Museum
Firefighters' Museum of Nova Scotia	Yarmouth	Yarmouth	Southwestern Nova Scotia	Firefighting	website, part of the Nova Scotia Museum, vintage firefighting equipment, artifacts, memorabilia
Fishermen's Life Museum	Jeddore Oyster Pond	Halifax Regional Municipality	Eastern Shore	Historic house	website, part of the Nova Scotia Museum, early 20th-century period fishermen's house
Fisheries Museum of the Atlantic	Lunenburg	Lunenburg	Southern Nova Scotia	Maritime	website, part of the Nova Scotia Museum
Fort Anne National Historic Site	Annapolis Royal	Annapolis	Annapolis Valley	Military	Fort ruins and museum of over 400 years of military history
Fort Edward National Historic Site	Windsor	Hants	Fundy Shore	Military	18th-century blockhouse with exhibits
Fort Petrie Military Museum	New Victoria	Cape Breton	Cape Breton Island	Military	
Fort Point Lighthouse	Liverpool	Queens	Southern Nova Scotia	Maritime	website, lighthouse, keeper's house, costumed interpreters, maritime history
Fort Point Museum	LaHave	Lunenburg	Southern Nova Scotia	History	website, local history
Fortress of Louisbourg	Louisbourg	Cape Breton	Cape Breton Island	Living	Reconstructed 18th-century French fortified town
Fultz House	Lower Sackville	Halifax Regional Municipality	Metro Halifax	History	Local history
Fundy Geological Museum	Parrsboro	Cumberland	Fundy Shore	Natural history	Geology, rocks, minerals, fossils, part of the Nova Scotia Museum
Fundy Tidal Interpretive Centre	South Maitland	Hants	Fundy Shore	Multiple	website, natural history of the Bay of Fundy tides, local history and maritime heritage
George and Mary Lynch Heritage Museum	Berwick	Kings	Annapolis Valley	Transportation	Carriages, sleighs and equipment
Giant MacAskill Museum	Englishtown	Victoria	Cape Breton Island	Biographical	Life history of Angus MacAskill and the local Scottish heritage
Gilberts Cove Lighthouse	Gilberts Cove	Digby	Southern Nova Scotia	Maritime	website, lighthouse museum operated by the Gilberts Cove and District Historical Society
Glace Bay Heritage Museum	Glace Bay	Cape Breton	Cape Breton Island	History	Local history
Goldboro Interpretive Centre	Goldboro	Guysborough	Eastern Shore	History	Local history and mining
Grand-Pré National Historic Site	Wolfville	Kings	Annapolis Valley	History	History and culture of the Acadians and the story of the Acadian deportation
Great Hall of Clans Museum	Englishtown	Victoria	Cape Breton Island	Ethnic	website, part of The Gaelic College, social and military history of the Scottish Highlanders who settled in Nova Scotia
Greenwood Military Aviation Museum	Greenwood	Kings	Annapolis Valley	Aviation	website, military aviation in Atlantic Canada
Gut of Canso Museum	Port Hastings	Inverness	Cape Breton Island	History	website, local history, formerly the Port Hastings Museum
Halifax Citadel National Historic Site	Halifax	Halifax Regional Municipality	Metro Halifax	Military	19th-century fort with living history demonstrations
Haliburton House Museum	Windsor	Hants	Fundy Shore	Biographical	Part of the Nova Scotia Museum, home of author Thomas Chandler Haliburton
Halifax and South Western Railway Museum	Lunenburg	Lunenburg	Southern Nova Scotia	Railway	website, 1940s period stationmaster's office, model railroad layout, artifacts
Hank Snow Home Town Museum	Liverpool	Queens	Southern Nova Scotia	Music	website, musician Hank Snow, includes Nova Scotia Country Music Hall of Fame, railroad exhibit room
HMCS Sackville	Halifax	Halifax Regional Municipality	Metro Halifax	Maritime	1940s WW II-era Flower-class corvette museum ship, open in summer
Hector Heritage Quay	Pictou	Pictou	Northumberland Shore	Maritime	website, includes replica 18th-century ship Hector, interpretive center of Scottish settlers, a working blacksmith shop, rigger's shop, carpentry shop, resident artist's studio
Highland Village Museum/An Clachan Gàidhealach	Iona	Victoria	Cape Breton Island	Living	Part of the Nova Scotia Museum, early 19th-century pioneer Scottish Gaelic village
Hildaniel Brown House	New Ross	Lunenburg	Southern Nova Scotia	Historic house	19th-century period house
Inverness Miner's Museum	Inverness	Inverness	Cape Breton Island	Mining	Coal mining and area pioneer history, located in a railway station, operated by the Ned MacDonald Historical Society
James House Museum	Bridgetown	Annapolis	Annapolis Valley	History	website, local history, military and art exhibits
Joggins Fossil Centre	Joggins	Cumberland	Fundy Shore	Natural history	Fossils from the Joggins Fossil Cliffs, area coal mining
Jost House	Sydney	Cape Breton	Cape Breton Island	Historic house	website, 18th-century house with rooms from different periods, operated by the Old Sydney Society
Killam Brothers' Shipping Office	Yarmouth	Yarmouth	Southwestern Nova Scotia	Maritime	Operated by the Yarmouth County Museum & Archives, restored 19th-century period shipping office
Kings County Museum	Kentville	Kings	Annapolis Valley	History	Local history
Khyber Centre for the Arts	Halifax	Halifax Regional Municipality	Metro Halifax	Art	Contemporary art centre
Knaut-Rhuland House Museum	Lunenburg	Lunenburg	Southern Nova Scotia	Historic house	Operated by the Lunenburg Heritage Society, early 19th-century period house
Lady Vanessa Fisheries Exhibit	Digby	Digby	Southern Nova Scotia	Maritime	website, 98' fishing vessel museum ship
LaHave Islands Marine Museum	LaHave	Lunenburg	Southern Nova Scotia	Maritime	website, history of the inshore fisheries and life on LaHave Islands
Lawrence House Museum	Maitland	Hants	Fundy Shore	History	website, part of the Nova Scotia Museum, mid-19th-century Victorian period mansion of a shipbuilder
Le Village Historique Acadien de la Nouvelle-Écosse	Pubnico	Yarmouth	Southwestern Nova Scotia	Open air	website, part of the Nova Scotia Museum, early 20th-century Acadian village
LeNoir Forge Museum	Arichat	Richmond	Cape Breton Island	History	website, local history
Les Trois Pignons	Chéticamp	Inverness	Cape Breton Island	Multiple	website, Acadian cultural centre including Museum of the Hooked Rug and Home Life, local history and culture
Little School Museum	Lockeport	Shelburne	Southern Nova Scotia	Education	website, 19th-century one-room schoolhouse
Little White School House Museum	Truro	Colchester	Fundy Shore	Education	website, located in a one-room school, history of education in Nova Scotia from the mid-19th century to the early 1970s
Loch Broom Log Church	Loch Broom	Pictou	Northumberland Shore	Religious	information, photos, replica of the first church built in Pictou County in the 1780s
Lordly House Museum	Chester	Lunenburg	Southern Nova Scotia	Historic house	website
Louisbourg Marine Museum	Louisbourg	Cape Breton	Cape Breton Island	Maritime	website, marine life, shipwreck artifacts, fishing
Lunenburg Art Gallery	Lunenburg	Lunenburg	Southern Nova Scotia	Art	website
Lyceum Museum	Sydney	Cape Breton	Cape Breton Island	History	website, local history, operated by the Old Sydney Society
MacAskill House Museum	St. Peter's	Richmond	Cape Breton Island	Historic house	website, 20th-century period home of marine photographer Wallace MacAskill
MacDonald House Museum	East Lake Ainslie	Inverness	Cape Breton Island	Historic house	1850s period house, barn with agriculture equipment, one room school, operated by the Lake Ainslie Historical Society
MacPhee House Community Museum	Sheet Harbour	Halifax Regional Municipality	Eastern Shore	History	Domestic and institutional life on the Eastern Shore of Nova Scotia from about 1850 to 1950
Mahone Bay Museum	Mahone Bay	Lunenburg	Southern Nova Scotia	History	website, local history
Main-a-Dieu Fishermen's Museum	New Victoria	Cape Breton	Cape Breton Island	Maritime	information
Malagash Area Heritage Museum	Malagash	Cumberland	Northumberland Shore	History	information, site of the first rock salt mine in Canada, salt industry, fishing, farming, local history
Marconi National Historic Site	Glace Bay	Cape Breton	Cape Breton Island	Technology	Site of Guglielmo Marconi's first transatlantic wireless station
Margaree Salmon Museum	Northeast Margaree	Inverness	Cape Breton Island	Sports	website, trout and salmon fishing, life of the salmon
Maritime Command Museum	Halifax	Halifax Regional Municipality	Metro Halifax	Military	History of the Canadian Forces Maritime Command
Maritime Museum of the Atlantic	Halifax	Halifax Regional Municipality	Metro Halifax	Maritime	Includes small craft and the CSS Acadia, a 180-foot steam-powered hydrographic survey ship launched in 1913, part of the Nova Scotia Museum
Mary E. Black Gallery	Halifax	Halifax Regional Municipality	Metro Halifax	Art	website, contemporary crafts, operated by the Nova Scotia Centre for Craft and Design
Mastodon Ridge	Stewiacke	Colchester	Fundy Shore	Natural history	website, roadside attraction that includes a craft store, toy store, mini golf, and an interpretive centre which displays area mastodon bones and a Bay of Fundy exhibit
McCulloch Heritage Centre	Pictou	Pictou	Northumberland Shore	History	website, local history
McCulloch House Museum	Pictou	Pictou	Northumberland Shore	Ethnic	Part of the Nova Scotia Museum, story of Dr. Thomas McCulloch and his roles in education and politics in Pictou in the early 19th century
Memory Lane Heritage Village	Lake Charlotte	Halifax Regional Municipality	Eastern Shore	Living	website, 1940s period village
Memory Lane Railway Museum	Middleton	Annapolis	Annapolis Valley	Railway	website, memorabilia and artifacts from the Dominion Atlantic Railway
Millbrook Cultural and Heritage Centre	Truro	Colchester	Fundy Shore	First Nations	website, Mi'kmaq heritage and culture, formerly known as the Glooscap Heritage Centre
Milton Blacksmith Shop Museum	Milton	Queens	Southern Nova Scotia	Technology	website, blacksmith shop with tools and equipment
Moose River Gold Mines Museum	Moose River Gold Mines	Halifax Regional Municipality	Metro Halifax	Mining	information under attractions, park and gold mining museum
Mount Hanley Schoolhouse Museum	Mount Hanley	Annapolis	Annapolis Valley	Education	One room schoolhouse
MSVU Gallery	Halifax	Halifax Regional Municipality	Metro Halifax	Art	website, part of Mount Saint Vincent University, contemporary art with a focus on the representation of women as cultural subjects and producers
Muir-Cox Shipbuilding Interpretive Centre	Shelburne	Shelburne	Southern Nova Scotia	Maritime	website, area shipbuilding industry
Mulgrave Heritage Centre	Mulgrave	Guysborough	Eastern Shore	History	information, local history
Musée des Acadiens des Pubnicos	West Pubnico	Yarmouth	Southwestern Nova Scotia	Multiple	website, Acadian history and culture, located in an 1864 historic house, collection of cameras
Musée La Pirogue	Chéticamp	Inverness	Cape Breton Island	Maritime	website, fishing industry
Musée Église Sainte-Marie Museum	Church Point	Digby	Southern Nova Scotia	Religious	Early 20th-century wooden church, largest wooden church in North America
Musquodoboit Railway Museum	Musquodoboit Harbour	Halifax Regional Municipality	Eastern Shore	Railway	information
Nicolas Denys Museum	St. Peter's	Richmond	Cape Breton Island	Biographical	website, New France leader Nicolas Denys
North Highlands Community Museum	Cape North	Victoria	Cape Breton Island	History	website, local history and rural life
North Hills Museum	Granville Ferry	Annapolis	Annapolis Valley	Historic house	website, website, part of the Nova Scotia Museum, operated by the Annapolis Heritage Society, 1764 farmhouse with collection of 18th-century paintings, ceramics, glassware and furniture
North Queens Heritage House Museum	Caledonia	Annapolis	Annapolis Valley	History	information under Attractions, local history, period room displays
North Sydney Historical Museum	North Sydney	Cape Breton	Cape Breton Island	History	website, local history
Northumberland Fisheries Museum	Pictou	Pictou	Northumberland Shore	Maritime	website, area fishing industry and sea heritage; 3 sites in town, including a Canadian former National Railway Station, a lobster hatchery, and a replica lighthouse
Nova Scotia Highlanders Regimental Museum	Amherst	Cumberland	Northumberland Shore	Military	website, history of The Nova Scotia Highlanders
Nova Scotia Lighthouse Interpretive Centre	Port Bickerton	Guysborough	Eastern Shore	Maritime	information, information, located at the Port Bickerton Lighthouse, restored 1930s keeper's house and lighthouse, exhibits on lighthouses in Nova Scotia
Nova Scotia Museum of Industry	Stellarton	Pictou	Northumberland Shore	Industry	Part of the Nova Scotia Museum, includes mines, factories, railroads, home-based industries, computers, railroads and more
Nova Scotia Museum of Natural History	Halifax	Halifax Regional Municipality	Metro Halifax	Natural history	website, part of the Nova Scotia Museum
Nova Scotia Sports Hall of Fame	Halifax	Halifax Regional Municipality	Metro Halifax	Sports	Outstanding athletes, teams and sport builders in Nova Scotia
O'Dell House Museum	Annapolis Royal	Annapolis	Annapolis Valley	Historic house	website, operated by the Annapolis Heritage Society, Victorian period stagecoach inn and tavern
Old Guysborough Court House Museum	Guysborough	Guysborough	Eastern Shore	History	website, information, local history
Old Meeting House Museum	Barrington	Shelburne	Southern Nova Scotia	History	website, part of the Nova Scotia Museum, 18th-century meeting house and non-conformist house of worship, managed by the Cape Sable Historical Society
Old Temperance Hall Museum	Smith's Cove	Digby	Southern Nova Scotia	History	information, local history
Orangedale Historical Society Museum	Orangedale	Inverness	Cape Breton Island	History	website, local history
Orangedale Railway Museum	Orangedale	Inverness	Cape Breton Island	Railway	1886 railroad station with artifacts, model railroad and equipment
Ottawa House by the Sea Museum	Parrsboro	Cumberland	Central	History	website, local history
Out of the Fog Lighthouse Museum	Half Island Cove	Guysborough	Eastern Shore	Maritime	information, information, way of life on a lightstation
Parkdale-Maplewood Museum	Maplewood	Lunenburg	Southern Nova Scotia	History	website, local history, rural life from 1840 to present
Parrsboro Rock & Mineral Shop & Museum	Parrsboro	Cumberland	Central	Natural history	website, fossils, rocks, minerals
Pelton-Fuller House	Yarmouth	Yarmouth	Southwestern Nova Scotia	Historic house	website, operated by the Yarmouth County Historical Society, late Victorian period summer home of Alfred Fuller, the original "Fuller Brush Man"
Perkins House Museum	Liverpool	Queens	Southern Nova Scotia	Historic house	Part of the Nova Scotia Museum, 18th-century period house, history of early Nova Scotia pre-Loyalist culture and colonial lifestyle
Pictou County Military Heritage Museum	New Glasgow	Pictou	Northumberland Shore	Military	information, area's military past
Pictou County Sports Heritage Hall of Fame	New Glasgow	Pictou	Northumberland Shore	Sports	information
Point Tupper Heritage Association Museum	Point Tupper	Richmond	Cape Breton Island	History	information, local history
Port Bickerton Lighthouse	Port Bickerton	Guysborough	Eastern Shore	History	website, local history and area maritime history
Port Loggia Gallery	Halifax	Halifax Regional Municipality	Metro Halifax	Art	website, part of the Nova Scotia College of Art and Design University's Port Campus
Port Royal Farm and Country Museum	Granville Ferry	Annapolis	Annapolis Valley	Agriculture	information, farm implements and tools, farm household utensils, rural household items
Port-Royal National Historic Site	Granville Ferry	Annapolis	Annapolis Valley	Open air	Recreated early 17th-century French colony with costumed interpreters
Prescott House Museum	Starr's Point	Kings	Annapolis Valley	Historic house	Part of the Nova Scotia Museum, mid-19th-century manor home of horticulturalist Charles Ramage Prescott
Queens County Museum	Liverpool	Queens	Southern Nova Scotia	History	information, local history
Randall House Museum	Wolfville	Kings	Annapolis Valley	Historic house	19th-century period house, operated by the Wolfville Historical Society
River Hebert Miners Memorial Museum	River Hebert	Cumberland	Central	Mining	information, coal mining
Riverview Ethnographic Museum	Bear River	Annapolis	Annapolis Valley	Textiles	information, folk costumes and artifacts from over 90 countries
Ross Creek Centre for the Arts	Canning	Kings	Annapolis Valley	Art	website, art centre with gallery
Ross Farm Museum	New Ross	Lunenburg	Southern Nova Scotia	Agriculture	19th-century working farm
Ross-Thomson House & Store Museum	Shelburne	Shelburne	Southern Nova Scotia	Historic house	website, part of the Nova Scotia Museum, 18th-century period store and house
Rossignol Cultural Centre	Liverpool	Queens	Southern Nova Scotia	Multiple	website, complex includes the Apothecary Museum; Museums of Hunting, Fishing, Guidesports & Mi’kmaq History; Wildlife Museum; Folk Art Museum; open air Cultural Village; Laing Art Gallery; Wildlife Art Gallery; Outhouse Museum
Royal Canadian Legion Military Museum	Dartmouth	Halifax Regional Municipality	Metro Halifax	Military	information
Saint Mary's University Art Gallery	Halifax	Halifax Regional Municipality	Metro Halifax	Art	website, part of Saint Mary's University (Halifax), contemporary art
Samuel Wood Museum	Lower Woods Harbour	Shelburne	Southern Nova Scotia	History	information, local history
Scott Manor House	Bedford	Halifax Regional Municipality	Metro Halifax	Historic house	18th-century house with local history artifacts
Seal Island Lighthouse Museum	Barrington	Shelburne	Southern Nova Scotia	Maritime	website, operated by the Cape Sable Historical Society, 1/2 size replica of original lighthouse, exhibits of artifacts and memorabilia from lighthouses in the area
Shand House Museum	Windsor	Hants	Fundy Shore	Historic house	Part of the Nova Scotia Museum, late 19th-century Victorian period house
Shearwater Aviation Museum	Shearwater	Halifax Regional Municipality	Eastern Shore	Aviation	Canadian maritime military aviation
Shelburne County Museum	Shelburne	Shelburne	Southern Nova Scotia	History	website, local history
Sherbrooke Village	Sherbrooke	Guysborough	Eastern Shore	Living	website, depicts a typical Nova Scotian village from 1860 to pre-WW1, part of the Nova Scotia Museum
Sherman Hines Museum of Photography	Liverpool	Queens	Southern Nova Scotia	Photography	website, images, cameras and artifacts from key figures in Nova Scotian photography
Sinclair Inn Museum	Annapolis Royal	Annapolis	Annapolis Valley	Historic house	website, operated by the Annapolis Heritage Society, 18th-century inn
Sport Tuna Fishing Museum and Interpretive Centre	Wedgeport	Yarmouth	Southwestern Nova Scotia	Maritime	website, equipment, memorabilia and photos of sport tuna angling
Springhill Miners' Museum	Springhill	Cumberland	Central	Mining	information, area coal mining
SS Atlantic Heritage Park	Terence Bay	Halifax Regional Municipality	Eastern Shore	Art	website, interpretive center with recovered artifacts and monument at site of 1873 sinking of the transatlantic ocean liner SS Atlantic
St. Francis Xavier University Art Gallery	Antigonish	Antigonish	Northumberland Shore	Art	information, part of St. Francis Xavier University
St. Mary's River Association Education and Interpretive Centre	Sherbrooke	Guysborough	Eastern Shore	Natural history	website, salmon angling, life cycle of salmon, local wildlife, river ecology
St. Patrick's Church Museum	Sydney	Cape Breton	Cape Breton Island	History	website, local history exhibits in an 1828 church, operated by the Old Sydney Society
Stewiacke Valley Museum	Upper Stewiacke	Colchester	Fundy Shore	History	website, website, local history
Sutherland Steam Mill Museum	Denmark	Colchester	Northumberland Shore	Technology	Restored steam woodworking mill from the 1890s, part of the Nova Scotia Museum
Sydney & Louisburg Railway Museum	Louisbourg	Cape Breton	Cape Breton Island	Railway	website, coal-hauling times of the Sydney & Louisburg Railway and its marine connections
Sydney Mines Heritage Museum	Sydney Mines	Cape Breton	Cape Breton Island	History	website, local history, located in a former railway station
Thomas McCulloch Museum	Halifax	Halifax Regional Municipality	Metro Halifax	Natural history	website, part of Dalhousie University, preserved bird specimens, ceramic mushrooms, corals, shells, insects, butterflies
Tupperville School Museum	Bridgetown	Annapolis	Annapolis Valley	Education	information, one room schoolhouse
Uniacke Estate Museum Park	Mount Uniacke	Hants	Fundy Shore	Historic house	Part of the Nova Scotia Museum, early 19th-century period Georgian estate with fine antiques
U.N.I.A. Cultural Museum	Glace Bay	Cape Breton	Cape Breton Island	Ethnic	website, history and contributions of African Nova Scotians
Wagmatcook Culture and Heritage Centre	Wagmatcook	Victoria	Cape Breton Island	First Nations	website, history and culture of the Mi’kmaq People
Wallace and Area Museum	Wallace	Cumberland	Northumberland Shore	History	website, information, local history
Shubenacadie Tinsmith Museum	Shubenacadie	Hants	Fundy Shore	History	Includes 1890s tin shop, a hardware store from the 1920s, an artisans room, local handcrafts, period living rooms and clothing, farm relics, military tribute
Waverley Heritage Museum	Waverley	Cumberland	Metro Halifax	History	website, local history exhibits in a former church
West Hants Historical Society Museum	Windsor	Hants	Fundy Shore	History	website, local and county history
Western Counties Military Museum	Barrington	Shelburne	Southern Nova Scotia	Military	website, operated by the Cape Sable Historical Society
Weymouth Historical Society	Weymouth	Digby	Southern Nova Scotia	History	website, local history
Whale Interpretive Centre	Pleasant Bay	Inverness	Cape Breton Island	Natural history	information, natural history of whales
Whitman House Museum	Canso	Guysborough	Eastern Shore	History	information, information, local history
Whitney Pier Historical Museum	Sydney	Cape Breton	Cape Breton Island	History	website, local history, located in a former synagogue
Wile Carding Mill	Bridgewater	Lunenburg	Southern Nova Scotia	Textile	Water-powered wool carding mill, part of the Nova Scotia Museum
Windsor Hockey Heritage Centre	Windsor	Hants	Fundy Shore	Sports	information, information, history of ice hockey
W. L. Sweeney Fisheries Museum	Yarmouth	Yarmouth	Southwestern Nova Scotia	Maritime	website, includes simulation of a traditional fishing wharf with fishing, processing and ship repair sheds, wharf decks and a coastal freighter, marine art, maritime gear and equipment
Yarmouth County Museum & Archives	Yarmouth	Yarmouth	Southwestern Nova Scotia	History	Local history

== See also ==
- Nature centres in Nova Scotia

== Defunct museums ==
- Bras d'Or Lakes & Watershed Interpretive Centre, Baddeck, closed in 2014
- Wild Blueberry & Maple Centre, Oxford (closed 2009)
