= Balmoral =

Balmoral may refer to:

== Places ==
=== Australia ===
- Balmoral, New South Wales, a locality of Sydney
- Balmoral, New South Wales (Lake Macquarie)
- Balmoral, New South Wales (Southern Highlands)
- Balmoral, Queensland
- Balmoral Ridge, Queensland
- Balmoral, Victoria

=== Belgium ===
- Balmoral, a hamlet near the town of Spa, Belgium

=== Canada ===
- Balmoral, British Columbia
- Balmoral, New Brunswick
- Balmoral Parish, New Brunswick
- Balmoral Mills, Nova Scotia
- Balmoral, Ontario, a community in Haldimand County
- Balmoral Grist Mill Museum, Balmoral Mills, Nova Scotia
- Balmoral, Manitoba

=== New Zealand ===
- Balmoral, New Zealand, a suburb of Auckland

=== Northern Ireland ===
- Balmoral (District Electoral Area), an area in south Belfast
- Balmoral railway station, Belfast
- Balmoral Golf Club, Belfast
- The Balmoral Show, an agricultural show that takes place annually near Belfast
- Balmoral Park, Lisburn, the new location of the Balmoral Show

=== Scotland ===
- Balmoral, a suburb of Galashiels
- Balmoral Castle, a residence of King Charles III in Aberdeenshire, Scotland
- Balmoral Hotel in Edinburgh

=== South Africa ===
- Balmoral, Mpumalanga, a village and colliery near Witbank

=== United States ===
- Balmoral, Louisiana
- Balmoral, Maryland
- Balmoral, Tennessee
- Balmoral, Wisconsin
- Balmoral Park, Illinois, horse racing track in Crete, Illinois
- Lakewood Balmoral Historic District, Chicago, Illinois

== Clothing ==
- Balmoral bonnet, an unbrimmed cap common in Highland dress
- Balmoral (shoe), a type of men's dress shoe
- Balmoral tartan pattern worn by the British Royal Family

== Education ==
- Balmoral Hall School, Winnipeg, Canada
- Balmoral High School (Belfast, Northern Ireland)
- Balmoral Jr Secondary School, North Vancouver, British Columbia, Canada
- Balmoral School, Auckland, New Zealand
- Balmoral State High School, Queensland, Australia

== Food ==
- Balmoral Chicken

== Ships ==
- MV Balmoral (1949), a passenger ship used for pleasure cruises in the UK
- MV Balmoral (2008), a cruise ship owned and operated by Fred. Olsen Cruise Lines

== Theater ==
- Balmoral (play), a 1987 play by Michael Frayn

== See also ==
- Balmoral Reef Plate, small tectonic plate in the Pacific Ocean north of Fiji
- Battle of Coral–Balmoral, a series of actions in May and June 1968 during the Vietnam War
