= List of historic places in Hants County, Nova Scotia =

Hants County is a historical county and census division of Nova Scotia, Canada. This list compiles historic places recognized by the Canadian Register of Historic Places within the county.

== List of historic places ==
Name	Address	Coordinates	Government recognition (CRHP №)	Wikidata ID	Image
All Saints Anglican Church	652 New Ross Road; Leminster NS	44°49′15″N 64°17′06″W	Leminster municipality (11898)	Q137169211	Upload Photo
Christ Church	543 King Street; Windsor NS	44°59′25″N 64°07′52″W	Windsor municipality (12032)	Q137169225	Upload Photo
Christ Church Anglican Church of Canada	455 Northfield Road; Maitland NS	44°25′49″N 64°28′47″W	Maitland municipality (5750)	Q137169281	Upload Photo
Clockmaker's Inn	1399 King Street; Windsor NS	44°58′47″N 64°07′42″W	Nova Scotia (2908)	Q137169193	Upload Photo
Convocation Hall	17 Kings-Edgehill Lane; Windsor NS	44°58′57″N 64°08′09″W	Nova Scotia (4094)	Q107128631	More images
Dimock House	744 Highway 236; Scotch Village NS	45°02′47″N 64°00′44″W	Scotch Village municipality (11880)	Q137918062	Upload Photo
Fort Edward National Historic Site of Canada	Water Street; Windsor NS	44°59′43″N 64°08′05″W	Federal (7419, (2994)	Q867671	More images
Haliburton House	420 Clifton Avenue; Windsor NS	44°59′20″N 64°08′33″W	Nova Scotia (1275)	Q5642044	More images
Hantsport Railway Station	15 Station Road; Hantsport NS	45°04′07″N 64°10′35″W	Federal (4554), Nova Scotia (7816)	Q3096610	More images
James Miller House	14 Back Road; Shubenacadie East NS	45°06′24″N 63°23′25″W	Nova Scotia (15205)	Q136484935	More images
Kempt Shore Presbyterian Church	5659 Highway 215; Kempt Shore NS	45°07′39″N 64°11′39″W	Kempt Shore municipality (11815)	Q136481591	More images
King's College National Historic Site of Canada	1 College Street; Windsor NS	44°59′03″N 64°07′51″W	Federal (16276)	Q6410830	More images
Lawrence House	8660 Highway Number 215; Maitland NS	45°19′20″N 63°30′09″W	Nova Scotia (1274)	Q107128514	More images
Lawson House	653 King Street; Windsor NS	44°59′21″N 64°07′49″W	Windsor municipality (11858)	Q137169292	Upload Photo
Old Parish Burying Ground	1291 King Street; Windsor NS	44°58′51″N 64°07′45″W	Windsor municipality (11860)	Q30610824	More images
Richmond Hill Farm	664 College Road; Windsor NS	44°58′41″N 64°09′08″W	Nova Scotia (6956)	Q137169329	Upload Photo
Saint John the Evangelist Roman Catholic Church	339 King Street; Windsor NS	44°59′36″N 64°07′58″W	Nova Scotia (7269)	Q137169353	More images
Sangster Inn	444 Sangster Bridge Road; Falmouth NS	44°57′28″N 64°12′01″W	Nova Scotia (7015)	Q137169467	Upload Photo
Smith-Duckenfield House	8098 Hwy No. 215; Selma NS	45°19′13″N 63°32′03″W	Nova Scotia (5754)	Q136485176	Upload Photo
Springhurst	8557 No. 215 Highway; Maitland NS	45°19′30″N 63°30′27″W	Nova Scotia (7320)	Q136499737	Upload Photo
Thornton	646 King Street; Windsor NS	44°59′21″N 64°07′46″W	Windsor municipality (11877)	Q137169472	Upload Photo
Uniacke Estate Archaeological Site	Highway No. 1 Mount Uniacke NS	44°54′05″N 63°50′36″W	Nova Scotia (7302)	Q20006948	More images
Uniacke House	Highway No. 1 Mount Uniacke NS	44°54′06″N 63°50′42″W	Nova Scotia (3076)	Q20006948	More images

== See also ==
- List of historic places in Nova Scotia
- List of National Historic Sites of Canada in Nova Scotia
- Heritage Property Act (Nova Scotia)
