= The Balmoral =

The Balmoral may mean:

- The Balmoral Hotel (formerly the North British Hotel), in Edinburgh, Scotland
- MV Balmoral, a passenger ship which cruises the south coast of England

See also

- Balmoral (disambiguation)
