= Nova Scotia Museum =

Coordinates: 44.64558°N 63.58493°W

- Location: Nova Scotia, Canada
- Type: decentralised museum
- Visitors: 549,500 (2015) (Note: The following is the total attendance figure from all 28 Nova Scotia Museum locations.)
- Website: museum.novascotia.ca

Nova Scotia Museum (NSM) is the corporate name for the provincial museum system in Nova Scotia, Canada. The most decentralized museum in Canada, it forms a key part of the province's tourism infrastructure. At its peak, the Nova Scotia Museum system included 28 sites, but 40% of the sites were permanently closed in 2026 by Nova Scotia's Premier Tim Houston. The NSM delivers programs, exhibits and products which provide both local residents and tourists in Nova Scotian communities an opportunity to experience and learn about Nova Scotia's social and natural history. More than 600,000 people visit the facilities each year.

== History ==
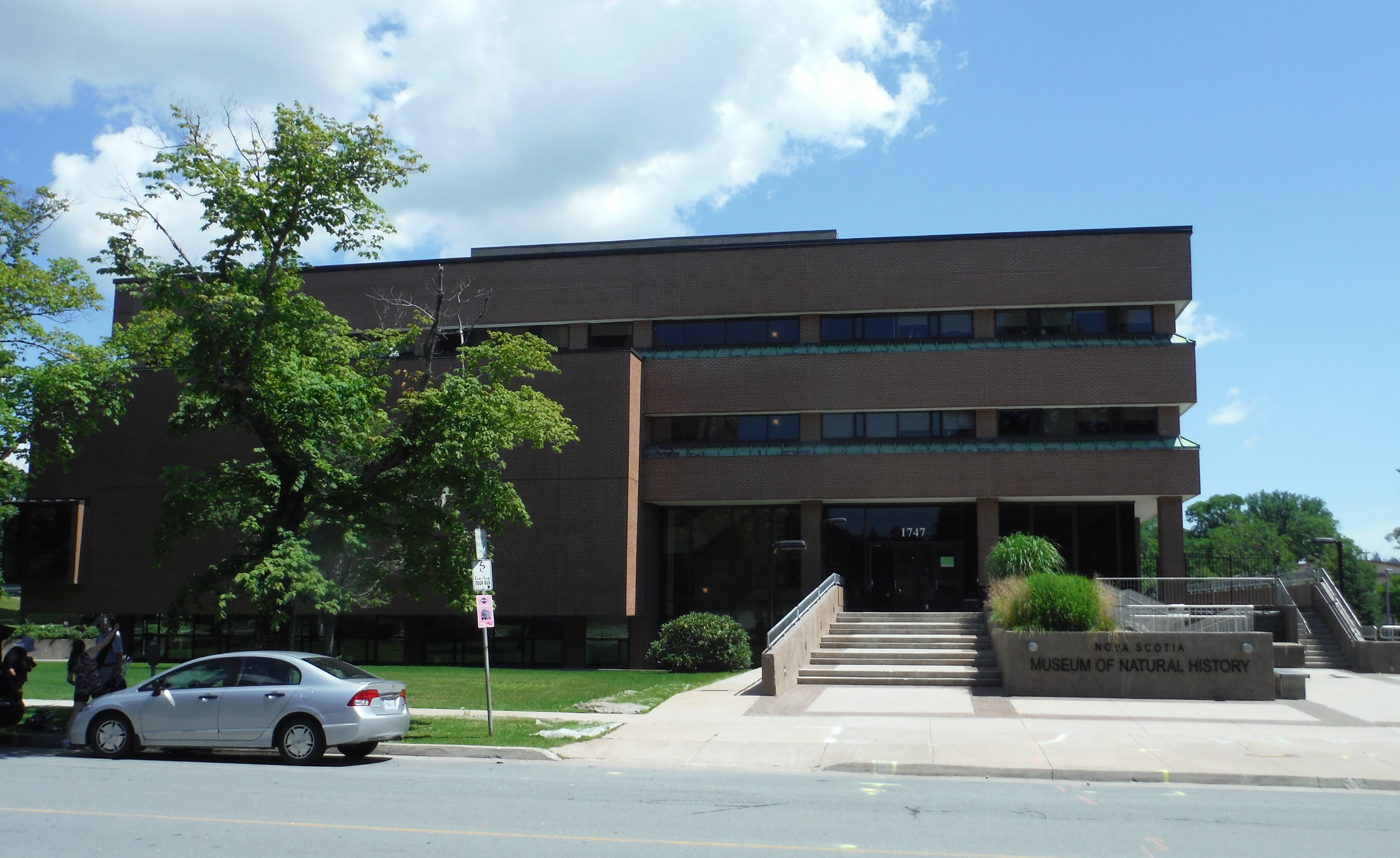
Nova Scotia Museum headquarters and Natural History Museum, Halifax

The Nova Scotia Museum was created by the Nova Scotia Museum Act, a provincial legislation.

The Nova Scotia Museum began with the collection of the Halifax Mechanics' Institute, founded in December 1831. The museum was formally established in 1868. The Rev. Dr. David Honeyman was the first curator. He was followed by Harry Piers, who as curator from 1899 to 1940 oversaw a steady expansion of the museum's collection.

The name Nova Scotia Museum emerged in 1960s when a new museum act combined both human and natural history in one institution. The museum soon expanded from a Halifax-based operation to open branch museums across the provinces, beginning with assuming responsibility for the historic houses Haliburton House Museum in Windsor, Uniacke House in Mount Uniacke and the Perkins House Museum in Liverpool. During this time, Marie Elwood was Chief Curator of History at the Nova Scotia Museum from 1973 to 1992. The Nova Scotia Museum sites at first focused on preserving rare historic homes and mills but grew to include sites that explored more general themes such as the fisheries, geology, Celtic and Acadian life. This made the Nova Scotia Museum unique in Canada as not one central museum, based in the capital, but a family of museums designed to include local knowledge and ownership of the museum's provincial mandate of exploring human and natural history.

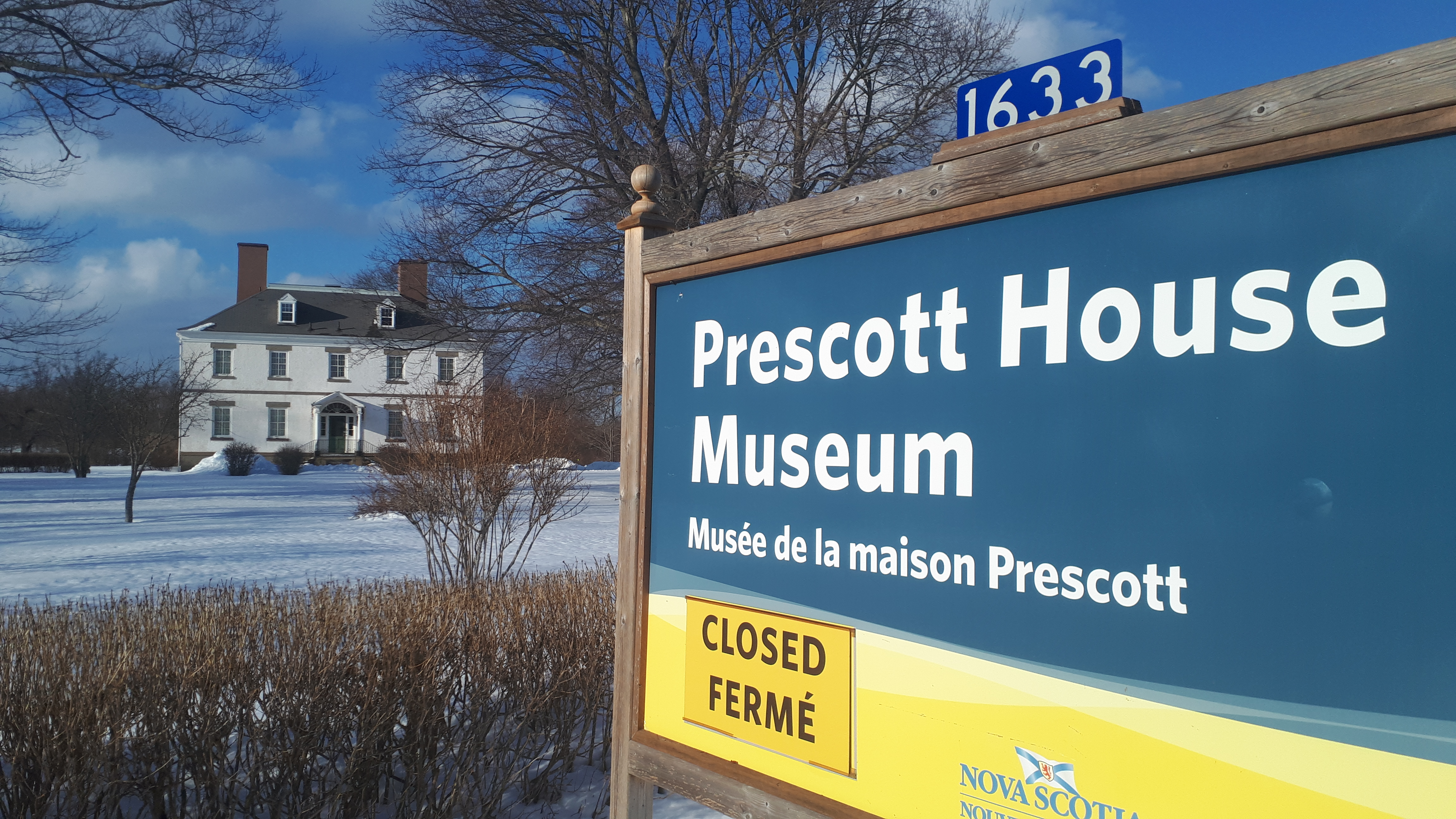
Prescott House Museum one of the 12 Nova Scotia Museum sites closed in 2009.

At its peak, the Nova Scotia Museum consisted of 28 sites, managing more than 200 historic buildings, living history sites, vessels and about one million artifacts and specimens, either directly or through a system of co-operative agreements with societies and local boards. However in February 2026, the Nova Scotia Museum faced an unprecedented round of cuts by Tim Houston's Conservative Party which permanently closed 12 of the museum system's 28 sites. Dave Ritcey, the Minister of Communities, Culture, Tourism and Heritage responsible for NSM, told reporters that Nova Scotia has too many small rural museums and the cuts were needed to focus on resources that make the most difference. The cuts to rural museum touched off protests across the province.

== Activities ==
As well as managing and maintaining historical collections, the museum has sponsored the publication of many historical books, pamphlets and other documents.

The museum staff and volunteers undertake a variety of restoration projects, create cultural and natural history displays, and participate in historical reenactments.

The organization also issues Heritage Research Permits, allowing scientists to collect and study fossils and other archaeological artifacts.

== Museums ==
- Hours of these locations will be effected by federal, municipal, and provincial holidays. Please check the Nova Scotia Museum website for specific information.

=== Cape Breton Island ===
Museum	Address	Place	Season	Schedule	Hours
Cossit House	225 George Street	Sydney		Permanent Closure announced February 2026	
Baile nan Gàidheal (Highland Village)	4119 Highway 223	Iona	15 June - 15 October	Weekly	10:00 - 16:30

=== Eastern Shore ===
Museum	Address	Place	Season	Schedule	Hours
Fisherman's Life Museum	10309 Highway 7	Oyster Pond		Permanent Closure announced February 2026	N/A
Sherbrooke Village	42 Main Street	Sherbrooke	16 June - tentative	Thursday - Monday (closed Tuesday-and-Wednesday)	9:30 - 17:00

=== Fundy Shore & Annapolis Valley ===
Museum	Address	Place	Season	Schedule	Hours
Fundy Geological Museum	162 Two Islands Road	Parrsboro	Year-round	Wednesday - Monday (closed Tuesday)	10:00 -17:00
Clifton Museum Park	424 Clifton Avenue	Windsor	1 June - 5 October	Wednesday - Sunday (closed Monday-and-Tuesday)	10:00 - 16:00
Lawrence House Museum	8660 Highway 215	Maitland		Permanent Closure announced February 2026	
North Hills Museum	5065 Granville Road	Granville Ferry		Permanent Closure announced February 2026	
Prescott House Museum	1633 Starr's Point Road	Starr's Point		Permanent Closure announced February 2026	
Shand House Museum	389 Avon Street	Windsor		Permanent Closure announced February 2026	

=== Halifax Metro ===
Museum	Address	Place	Season	Schedule	Hours
Maritime Museum of the Atlantic	1675 Lower Water Street	Halifax	Year-round (however, there are two seasons)	1 May - 31 October: Weekly; 1 November - 30 April: Tuesday - Sunday (closed Monday)	1 May - 31 October: Wednesday - Monday (9:30 - 17:30); Tuesdays (9:30 - 20:00); 1 November - 30 April: Tuesday (9:30 - 20:00); Wednesday - Saturday (9:30 - 17:00); Sunday (13:00 - 17:00)
Museum of Natural History	1747 Summer Street	Halifax	Year-round	Weekly	9:30 - 16:30
Uniacke Estate Museum Park	758 Highway 1	Mount Uniacke	16 June - 1 October	Tuesday - Sunday (closed Monday)	10:00 - 16:00

=== Northumberland Shore ===
Museum	Address	Place	Season	Schedule	Hours
Balmoral Grist Mill Museum	660 Matheson Brook Road	Tatamagouche	Year-round (except 17 July, 7 August, 14 August, 4 September, and 11 September)	Wednesday - Sunday (closed Monday-and-Tuesday)	9:30 - 16:30
Museum of Industry	147 North Food Street	Stellarton	Year-round	Weekly	9:30 - 16:30
McCulloch House Museum	100 Haliburton Road	Pictou	Permanent Closure announced February 2026		
Sutherland Steam Mill Museum	660 Matheson Brook Road	Tatamagouche	Permanent Closure announced February 2026		

=== South Shore ===
Museum	Address	Place	Season	Schedule	Hours
Barrington Woolen Mill	2368 Highway 3	Barrington		Permanent Closure announced February 2026	
Black Loyalist Heritage Centre	119 Birchtown Road	Shelburne	Year-round	Weekly	10:00 - 17:00
Dory Shop Museum	11 Dock Street	Shelburne	1 June - 15 October	Tuesday - Saturday (closed Sunday-and-Monday)	10:00 - 12:00, 13:00 - 16:00 (closed between 12:00 - 13:00)
Fisheries Museum of the Atlantic	68 Bluenose Drive	Lunenburg	Year-round	Weekly	9:30 - 17:00
Old Meeting House	2408 Highway 3	Barrington	1 June - tentative	Monday - Saturday (closed Sunday)	10:00 - 16:30
Perkins House Museum	105 Main Street	Liverpool		Permanent Closure announced February 2026	
Ross Farm Museum	4568 Highway 12	New Ross	Year-round	Tuesday - Sunday (closed Monday)	9:30 - 16:30
Ross-Thomson House & Store Museum	9 Charlotte Lane	Shelburne		Permanent Closure announced February 2026	
Wile Carding Mill	242 Victoria Road	Bridgewater		Permanent Closure announced February 2026	

=== Yarmouth & Acadian Shores ===
Museum	Address	Place	Season	Schedule	Hours
The Acadian Village of Nova Scotia	91 Old Church Road	Lower West Pubnico	30 May - 23 September (three seasons)	30 May - 3 July: Monday - Friday (closed Saturday-and-Sunday); 4 July - 27 August: Monday - Saturday (closed Sunday); 28 August - 23 September: Monday - Friday (closed Saturday-and-Sunday)	9:00 - 17:00
Firefighters' Museum of Nova Scotia	451 Main Street	Yarmouth	Year-round	Weekly	Monday - Saturday (9:00 - 17:00) Sunday (10:00 - 17:00)

== See also ==
- List of museums in Nova Scotia
