= ACAM =

ACAM may refer to:

- Atlantic Canada Aviation Museum
- American Classic Arcade Museum
