= Old Parish Burying Ground (Windsor, Nova Scotia) =

Historic site in Canada

Coordinates: 44°58′52″N 64°07′45″W

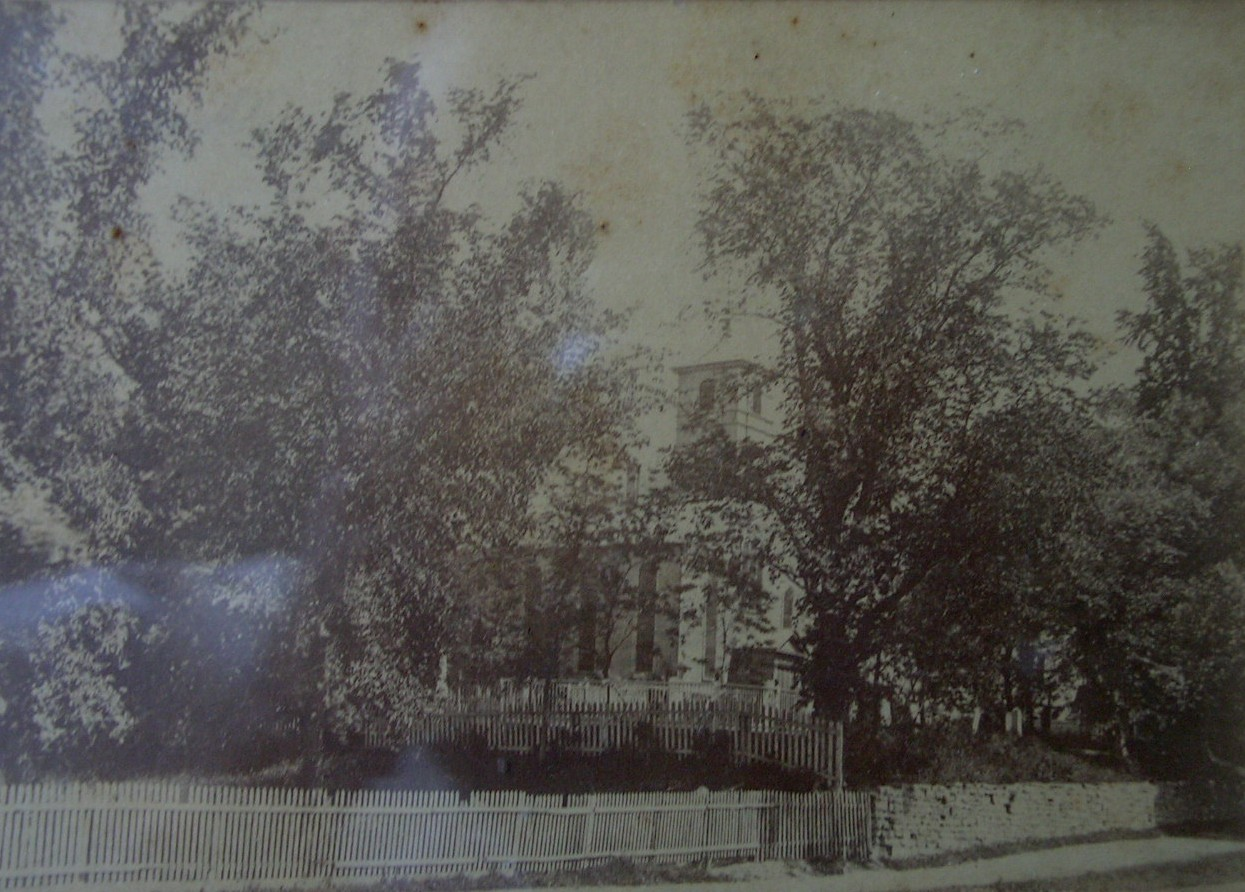
Christ Church on Old Parish Burying Ground before 1889

The Old Parish Burying Ground is the oldest protestant cemetery in Windsor, Nova Scotia and one of the oldest in Canada. The graveyard was located adjacent to the first protestant church in Windsor (1788). The oldest marker of Rachel Kelley is dated 1771, twelve years after the New England Planters began to settle the area.

In 1776, the Honourable Michael Francklin gave about two acres of land for erecting a Church, and for a “Burying Ground”. The Burying Ground was the site of the first two churches in Windsor. The first, which according to Hind was sixty feet square, was built in 1771. Rev. Joseph Bennett, the rector of this chapel appointed in 1775, was buried in the Old Parish Burying Ground in 1795. After the second church was built, this first building was moved opposite the entrance gates to King’s College and Hind reports that formed part of a house.

A second church was built in the Burying Ground between 1788 and 1790. The Church and Burying Ground were consecrated by the Right Reverend John Inglis on November 5, 1826.

On the night of 1 July 1892, Bishop Inglis's old church, the oldest in Windsor, burned to the ground. The fire began in the tower, and arson was suspected. A reward of $100 was offered. The memorial window in the chancel had been removed to the new church when it was built, but the mural tablets to Rev. William Cochran and Rev. William Colsel King were lost. So was the well toned bell that bore the inscription: " Me fecit Pieter Seest Amstelodami Anno 1771."

According to the survey at the West Hants Historical Society, the oldest surviving gravestone marks the death of Mrs. Rachel Kelly on January 27, 1771. In 1887, the cemetery was closed to burials. Members of some prominent Windsor and Nova Scotian families are buried in the Old Parish Burying Ground including: Isaac DesChamps, the fourth Chief Justice of Nova Scotia (1785-1788), Winckworth Tonge, grandson of one of the original land grantees, and Susanna Francklin, wife of Lieutenant Governor Michael Francklin who donated the land for the Burying Ground, as well as early presidents and professors of King’s College including William Cochran, the first President of the College.

Beyond the genealogical information which may be found in a cemetery, the gravestones tell their own story about attitudes towards death, the business of death and the symbols used by stone carvers to commemorate death. Many of the gravestones are decorated with hands in various positions, urns, cherubs, and other symbols common to gravestone of this period.

== Repairs ==
2019 - Restoration nearly complete on staircase leading into Windsor’s oldest Protestant cemetery.

2023 - Stone retaining wall around 18th century Windsor, N.S., cemetery getting repaired in 2023.

== Notable interments ==
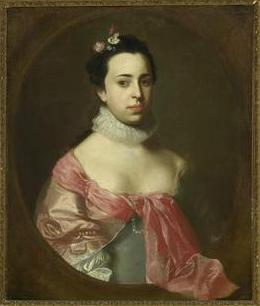
Susannah (Boutineau) Franklin (1762) by John Singleton Copley (wife of Hon. Michael Francklin; grandchild of Peter Faneuil), Uniacke Estate Museum Park

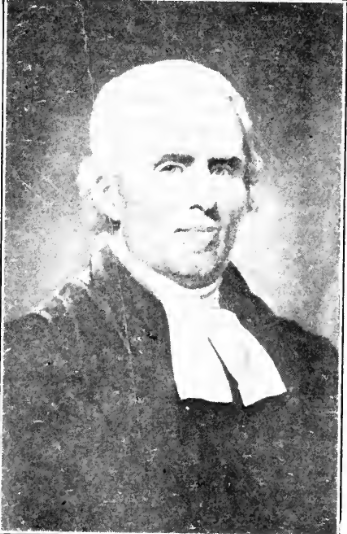
Rev William Cochran, Windsor, Nova Scotia
- Issac Deschamps, participated in the Bay of Fundy Campaign (1755)
- Rev. William Ellis (clergy person)
- Winckworth Tonge, grandson of Winckworth Tonge
- Rev. William Croscomb
- William Hersey Otis Haliburton
- Hon Nathaniel Ray Thomas (d.1791), unmarked grave
- Benjamin DeWolf (politician)
- Lucy Chandler Haliburton
- Lewis Morris Wilkins

== See also ==
- Little Dutch (Deutsch) Church
- Garrison Cemetery (Annapolis Royal, Nova Scotia)
- Royal Navy Burying Ground (Halifax, Nova Scotia)
- Old Burying Ground (Halifax, Nova Scotia)
- Hillcrest Cemetery (Lunenburg, Nova Scotia)
