= Barrington Woolen Mill =

Museum in Nova Scotia, Canada

Coordinates: 43°34.073′N 65°34.685′W

Barrington Woolen Mill Museum
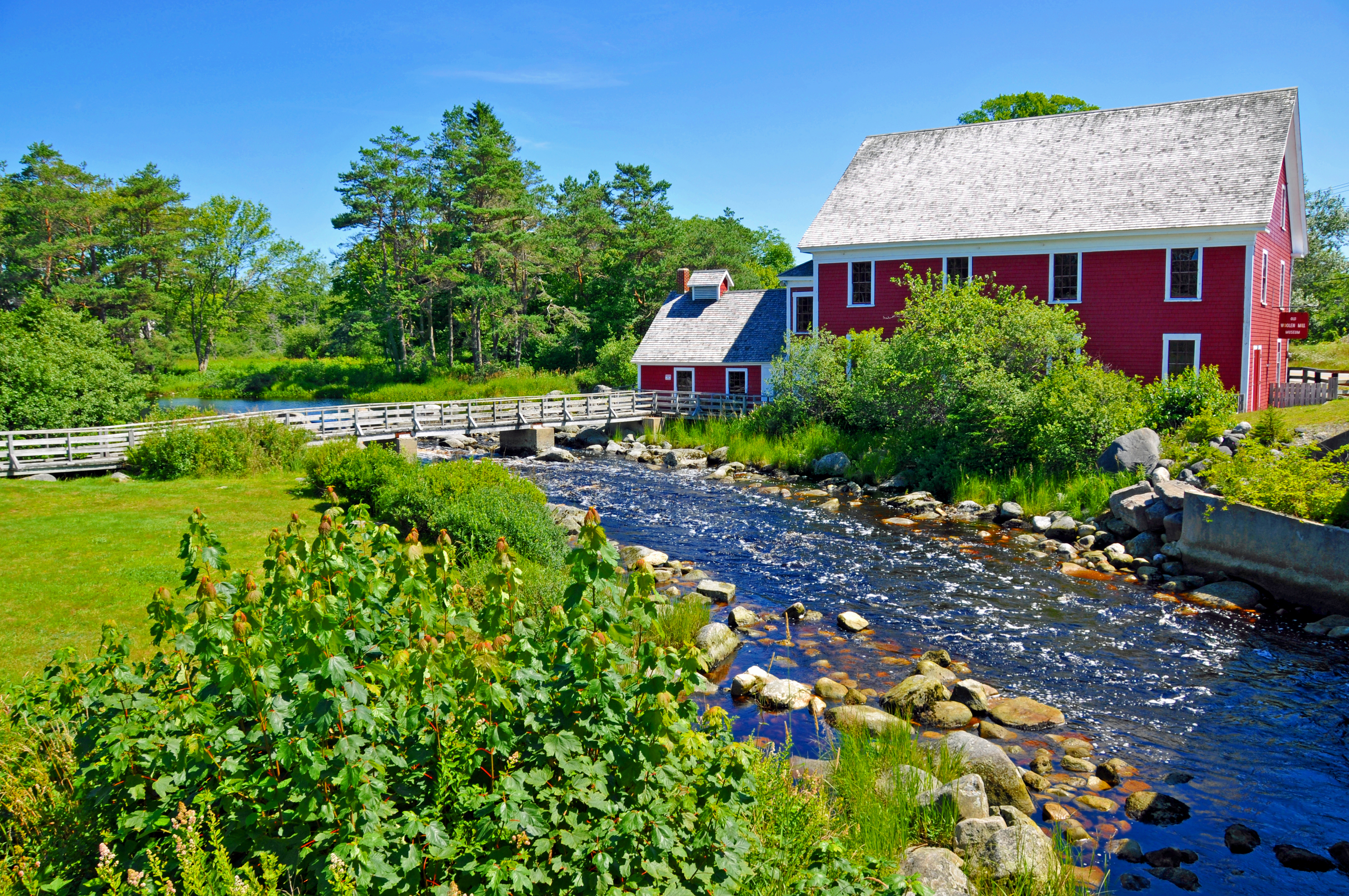
- Established: 1968
- Location: Barrington, Nova Scotia, Canada
- Type: Textile manufacturing museum
- Website: woolenmill.novascotia.ca

The Barrington Woolen Mill Museum, located in Barrington, Nova Scotia, is a part of the Nova Scotia Museum.

The museum is a preserved 19th century turbine mill. It was built in 1882, and ceased wool production in 1962. It became part of the Nova Scotia Museum system in 1967, as an example of one of the last small mills of the 1800s. The mill is listed on the Canadian Register of Historic Places (CRHP).

== See also ==
- List of museums in Nova Scotia
