= Michael Francklin =

Canadian politician

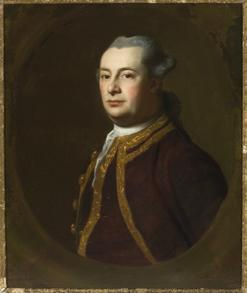
Michael Francklin By John Singleton Copley, Uniacke Estate Museum Park

Michael Francklin or Franklin (6 December 1733 – 8 November 1782) served as Nova Scotia's Lieutenant Governor from 1766 to 1772. He is buried in the crypt of St. Paul's Church (Halifax).

== Early life and immigration ==
Born in Poole, England, Francklin immigrated to Halifax, Nova Scotia in 1752. He worked as a trader and merchant, initially in association with Joshua Maugher.

== Capture ==
During Father Le Loutre's War, Michael Francklin was captured by a Mi'kmaw raiding party in 1754 and held captive for three months in which he learned the Mi'kmaw language and developed an appreciation for native culture.

== Political career ==
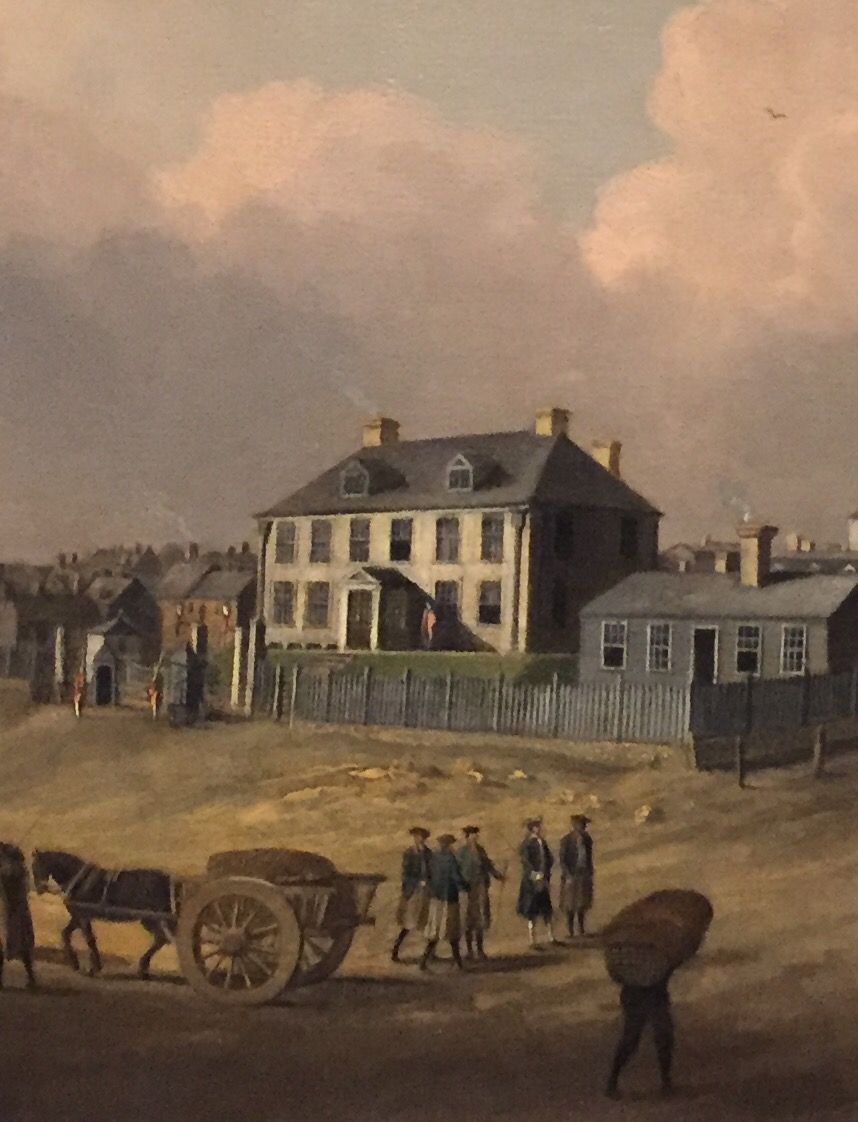
Governor Franklin's residence (built 1749). (Located on the site of Province House, which still is furnished with his Nova Scotia Council table)

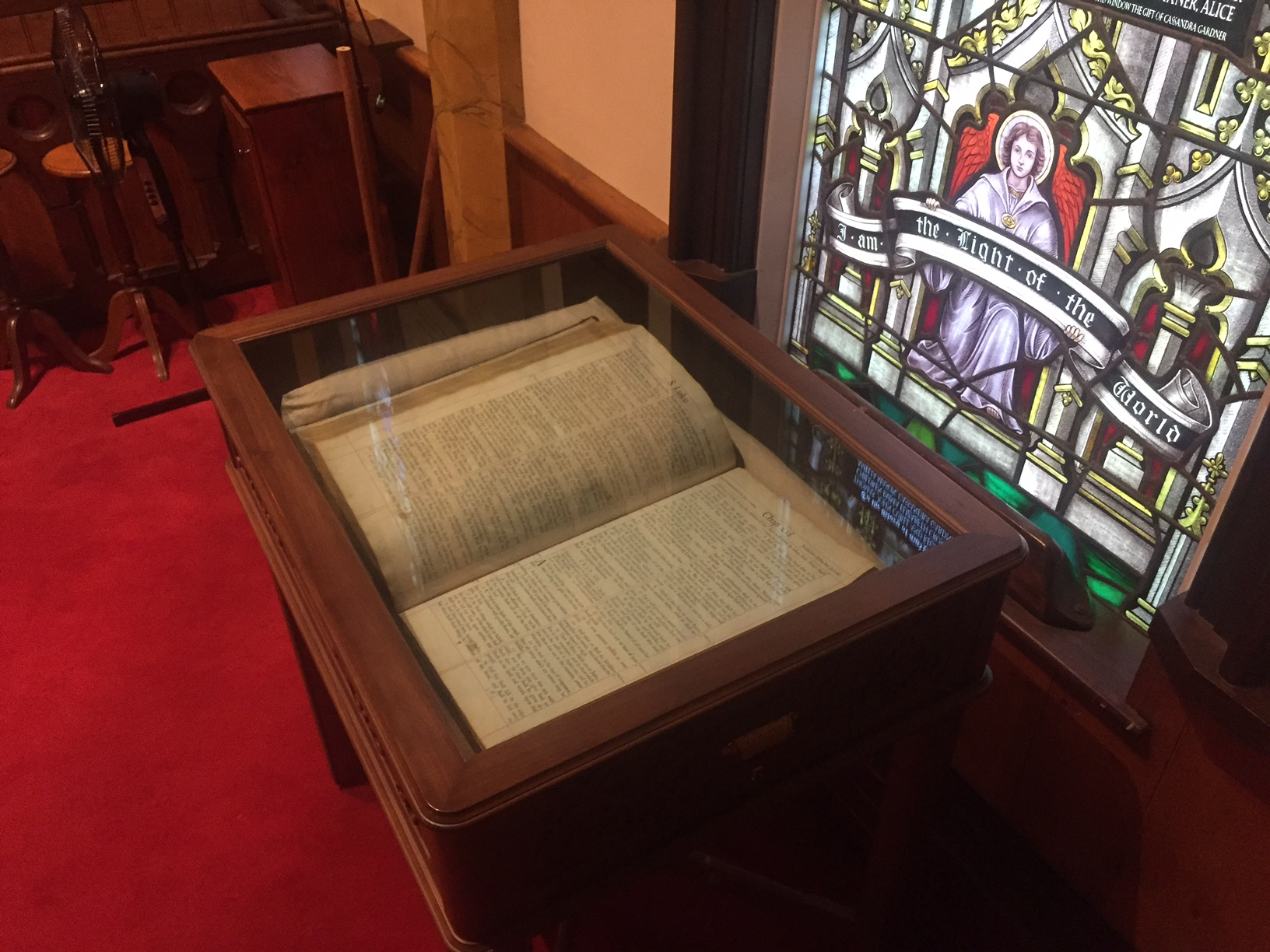
Michael Francklin's Bible, St. John's Anglican Church (Lunenburg), Nova Scotia (1765)

Francklin represented Lunenburg County from 1759 to 1760 and Halifax County from 1761 to 1762 in the Nova Scotia House of Assembly.

In May of 1762, he was named to the Nova Scotia Council.

In the early 1770s, he was responsible for bringing about the Yorkshire Emigration. He also played an important role in assisting the return of Acadians after the Expulsion of the Acadians by guaranteeing Catholic worship, land grants and a promise that there would be no second expulsion.

He established the Shubenacadie reserve in 1779.

== Family ==
On February 7, 1762, Francklin married Susannah Boutineau (b. 1740). Susannah died at Windsor, Nova Scotia, April 19, 1816 in her 76th year and is buried at the Old Parish Burying Grounds. She was the daughter of Joseph and Susannah (Faneuil) Boutineau, and granddaughter of Benjamin Faneuil.

Susannah and Michael had the following children:

1. James Boutineau, born July 31, 1763, d. 1841. Clerk to the House of Assembly for 42 years (1785-1828). Married Sarah Dering viv 1821. (She may have been the first wife of Nathaniel Ray Sr. (1731 - 1787). Only daughter was Elizabeth Gould Francklin who married Robert Fitzgerald Uniake.
2. Elizabeth Mauger Gould (1st m. to Dr. John Gould), born September 3, 1764. died 1817. Second wife of Rev. William Colsell King.
3. Susannah, born August 23, 1765. m (1) . Benjamin Davis of Pennsylvania, m (2) William Hersey Otis Haliburton.
4. Ann, born August 31, 1767.
5. Joshua Mauger, born September 1, 1769
6. Michael Nickleson, born August 20, 1773. Went to India, but subsequently entered business with relatives in London and died there in 1830.
7. John Robinson, born July 6, 1774. (w.c., Fri., 11 Mar. 1808 753. = 4 Jan. at Weymouth, Dorset: John Robinson FRANCKLIN, Esq., HEICS "Northumberland", s/o late Lt.-Gov. Francklin of Nova Scotia/' Meliora Elizabeth, eldest d/o Hon. John Butler BUTLER. NS Newspapers 1769 - 1812 p 46)
8. George Sackville Germain, born January 15, 1777. Studied law at Quebec. Died 8th Oct 1799 at Windsor while on a visit to friends.
9. Mary Phillipps, born October 7, 1779.
10. Sarah Nickleson, born December 21, 1780. Married Rev. Willoughby on 17 February 1801 at Halifax County

== Death ==
On November 8, 1782, while arranging with several Indian chiefs about winter supplies of blankets and clothing in his office on Granville St., north of the Army and Navy Depot; he suddenly died at the age of 62. He was given a grand public funeral which took place the next day and was buried in St. Paul's in a vault at the left of the altar. Over 200 Indians followed his coffin to the church, chanting the death song of the Mi'kmaq.

== Legacy ==
The Francklins long made their chief home at Windsor and were active supporters of the Anglican Church in that town. Lieutenant-Governor Francklin gave land for the parish church (Christ Church) and churchyard at Windsor, and Mrs. Francklin gave on April 28, 1801 an acre of land opposite of the church for a parsonage, and in 1815 a complete set of service books, including a handsomely-bound folio Bible, for use in public worship.

- namesake of Francklyn Street, Halifax, Nova Scotia
- namesake of Fort Franklin, Tatamagouche, Nova Scotia (1768)
- namesake of Mi'kmaq reserve Franklin Manor 22, Nova Scotia
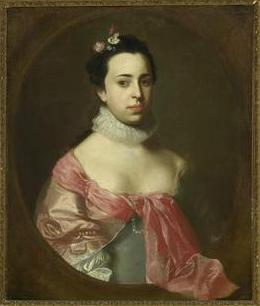
Susannah (Boutineau) Francklin (1762) by John Singleton Copley (wife of Michael Franklin; grandchild of Peter Faneuil), Uniacke Estate Museum Park

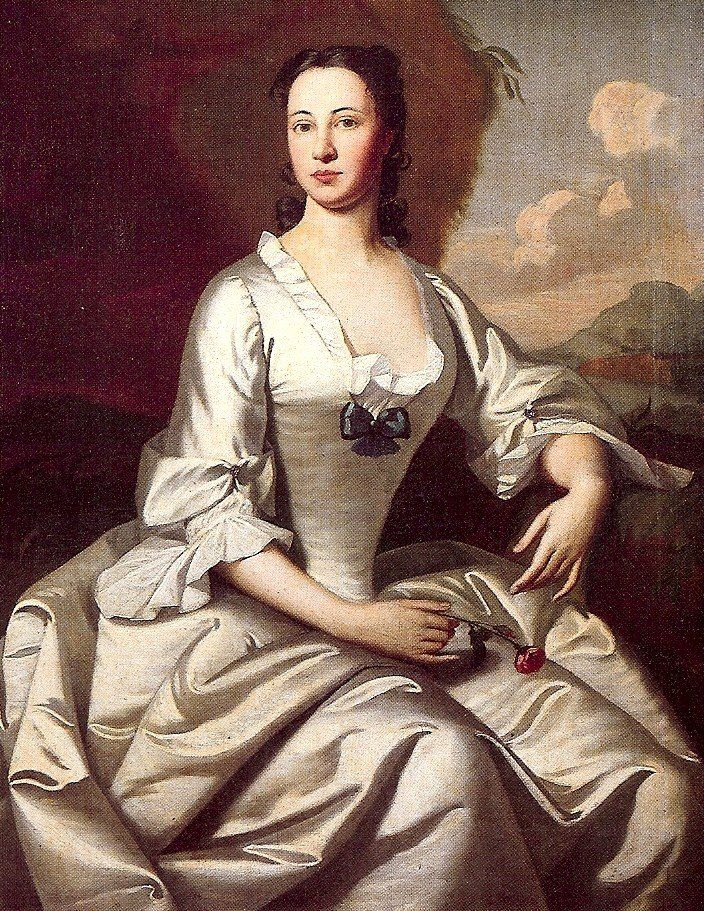
Susannah Boutineau by Robert Feke (1748), (mother-in-law of Michael Francklin), Uniacke Estate Museum Park

== See also ==
- Captivity Narratives - Nova Scotia

Government offices
Preceded by Benjamin Green	Lieutenant Governor of Nova Scotia; 1766-1776; Served under: Lord William Campbell and Francis Legge	Succeeded by Mariot Arbuthnot
