= Queens County Museum =

Museum in Liverpool, Nova Scotia

- Established: 1980
- Location: Liverpool, Nova Scotia, Canada
- Coordinates: 44.0397°N 64.7119°W
- Type: Heritage museum
- Accreditation: Canadian Museums Association
- Key holdings: Simeon Perkins diaries, scale-replica of the Liverpool Packet, Mi'kmaq artifacts
- Collections: Mi'kmaq, natural history, Privateer, military, shipbuilding
- Website: queenscountymuseum.com

The Queens County Museum is a heritage museum in Liverpool, Nova Scotia.

== History ==
The Queens County Museum was established in 1980. The building was constructed to resemble a colonial warehouse, as it is located next to the Perkins House Museum, which is a preserved colonial home built in 1766.

The museum is home to the Simeon Perkins diaries, which detail Perkins' life in Liverpool from 1766 to his death in 1812.

A book containing a Babe Ruth autograph was donated to the Queen County Museum in 2015. In 1933, 11-year-old Granville Nickerson approached Ruth, who was visiting Liverpool, and asked him to sign his copy of The Mill on the Floss by George Eliot.

In 2016, the museum received a grant of CA$2,000 from the Region of Queens Municipality, the first grant received from the municipality in 35 years.

In 2017, the Queens County Museum agreed to begin operating the historic Liverpool Courthouse, which had sat vacant since 2015. After the Queens County Museum took ownership of the courthouse, it became the Queens Museum of Justice & Exhibit Centre.

The Queens County Museum began operating the Fort Point Lighthouse in Liverpool as a seasonal attraction in 2021.

In early 2026, the Government of Nova Scotia shutdown 12 museums including the Perkins House Museum which had been cooperatively operated with the Queens County Museum. However, a new arrangement was reached between the museum and the provincial government. The museum will receive annual operating support through the Community Museum Assistance Program, while the historical society and museum board will take on greater responsibility in its operation.

== Thomas Raddall Research Centre ==
The Queens County Museum houses the Thomas Raddall Research Centre, which contains a library of local history materials. Publicly accessible archival holdings include genealogical, shipping, probate, and census records; a Mi'kmaq and Black Nova Scotian history collection, and every issue of the Queens County Advance published since 1929.

== See also ==
- List of museums in Nova Scotia
