= Glace Bay Heritage Museum =

Coordinates: 46.1974°N 59.9580°W

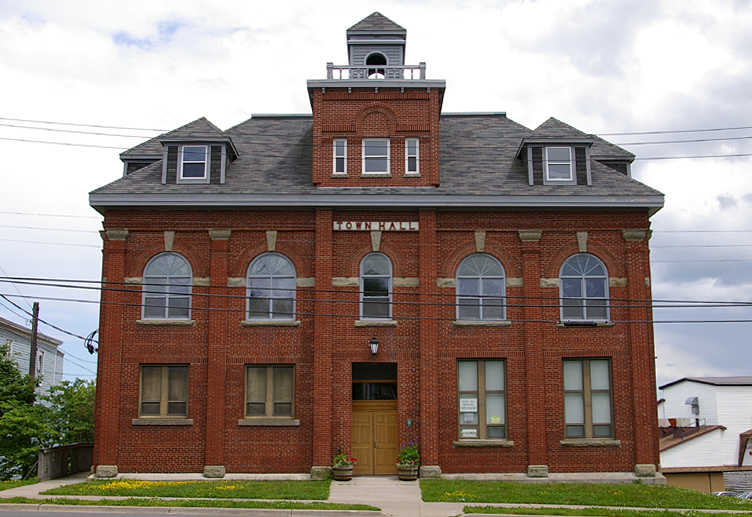
- Established: 2003
- Location: 14 McKeen Street, Glace Bay, Nova Scotia, Canada
- Type: Community Heritage Museum
- Curator: Elke Ibrahim
- Website: Glace Bay Heritage Museum

The Glace Bay Heritage Museum, or the Old Town Hall, is located in Glace Bay, Nova Scotia. The building, constructed in 1901, served as the town hall, billing centre, court, council chamber, fire station, police office, and jailhouse, before roughly 1989, when it was vacated and fell into disrepair as Glace Bay had joined the Cape Breton Regional Municipality. Starting in 1998, former teacher and sportsman Howard MacKinnon (1928–2019) and RCAF veteran and ex-Deputy Mayor Inglis MacAulay (1923–2017) formed the non-profit Glace Bay Heritage Museum Society in a bid to preserve the building as a cultural landmark; at the time, demolition of the site was being planned. Initial preparations were finished five years later in 2003, with most of the functions of the building now overseen by German-Canadian curator Elke Ibrahim. The second floor, including a sports and entertainment exhibit, was finalized in 2010.

The town's memorial to its deceased coal miners is located on the museum grounds.

Some items contained in the museum are:

- Central School 1988 time capsule (opened in 2021)
- Ex-Olympian Joey Mullins' original running shoes
- Extensive mining photographs and artifacts
- Collections of yearbooks and yearly almanacs
- Fishing artifacts

== Affiliations ==
The museum is affiliated with the CMA, CHIN, and Virtual Museum of Canada.

== See also ==
- List of museums in Nova Scotia
