= Apple Capital Museum =

Coordinates: 45°02′29.82″N 64°44′05.55″W

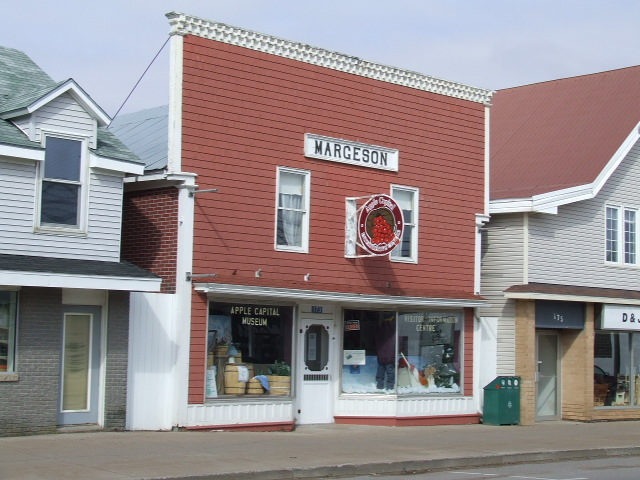
- Established: 1998
- Location: Commercial Street, Berwick, Nova Scotia Canada
- Type: municipal history museum
- Website: www.acmuseum.ednet.ns.ca/contents.htm

The Apple Capital Museum is a museum located in Berwick, Nova Scotia exploring the history of the Town of Berwick and near-by Kings County communities. The museum is housed in a restored 19th century store, originally the Harry Lyons harness shop. In the 1940s, it was purchased by Howard Margeson who operated a men's clothing store, taxi business and bicycle shop. It was donated to the Museum in 1998 by the Margeson family. The Museum was founded in 1998 and shares the building with the tourist bureau for the Town of Berwick. The apple industry is a major focus and the Museum includes a large working railway model of the town's centre during the height of Nova Scotia's apple industry in the 1930s with the extensive tracks and sidings of the Dominion Atlantic Railway. The museum began an annual vintage car rally in July 2012 which has grown to attract vintage cars and drivers and volunteers in period costume from across Nova Scotia. The Museum is run by the Apple Capital Museum Society and is open seasonally.

== See also ==
- List of museums in Nova Scotia
