= Sutherland Steam Mill Museum =

Coordinates: 45°42′35.5″N 63°09′36.5″W

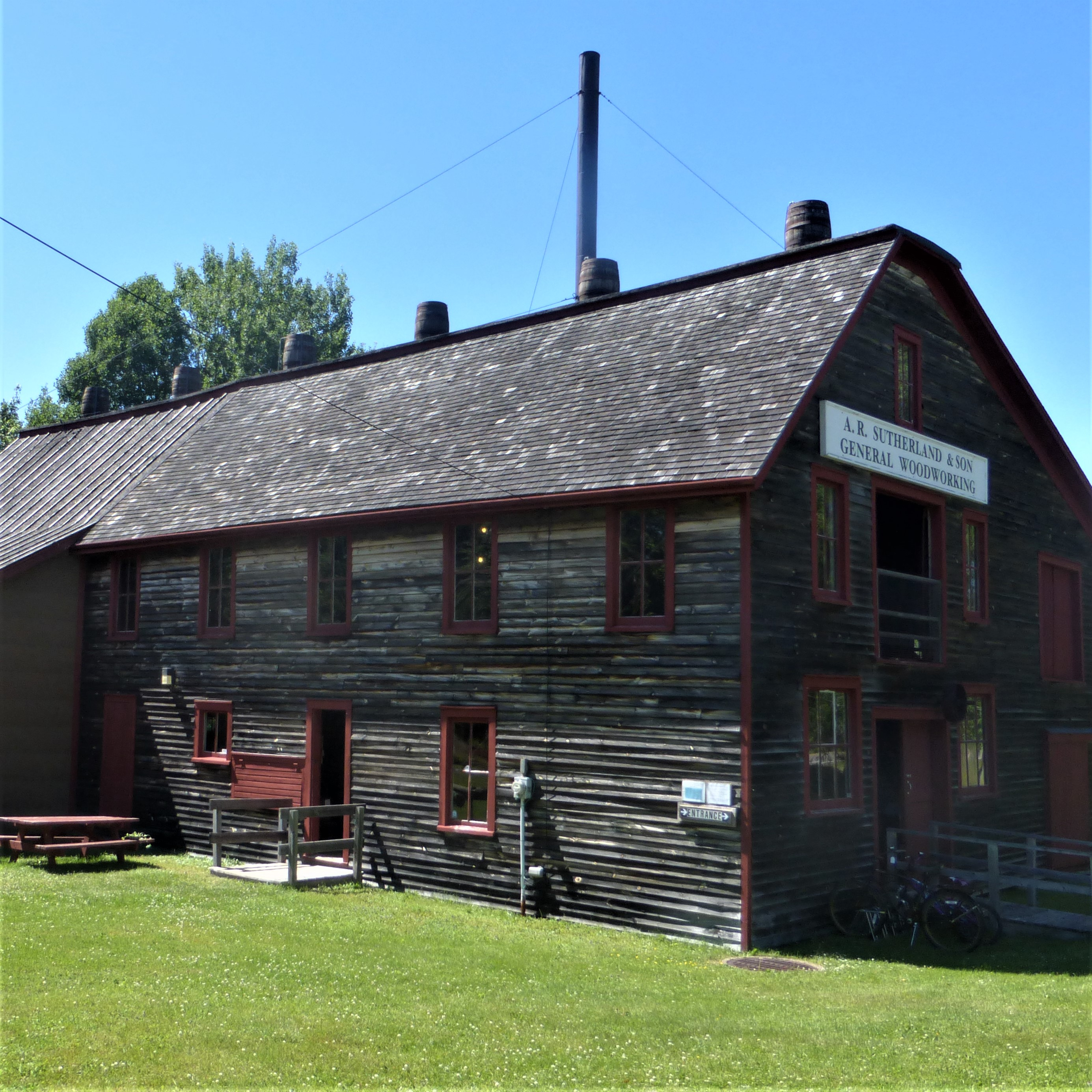
- Established: 1970
- Dissolved: 2026
- Location: Denmark, Nova Scotia, Canada
- Type: Mill museum

The Sutherland Steam Mill Museum is a restored steam woodworking mill from the 1890s located in Denmark, Nova Scotia. The mill operated until 1958. Today it is part of the Nova Scotia Museum system. In 2009 the mill was recognised by the Heritage Property Act (Nova Scotia) and listed on the Canadian Register of Historic Places.

The museum represents the transition from water powered mills, such as that preserved at the nearby Balmoral Grist Mill Museum, to the more powerful and efficient steam-driven mill. The mill was located in the centre of a vast woodland area and was situated next to a railroad, the "Short Line" of the Intercolonial Railway. Thus it had excellent access to both raw materials and to markets though shipping terminals at Pictou and Wallace. At its peak, the mill employed more than a dozen workers, and it produced sawn lumber, sleds and carriages, sashes and doors and other architectural products such as gingerbread trim.

The founder of the mill, Alexander Sutherland, apprenticed as a carriage maker at the McKenzie Carriage Factory at West River. Around 1891 he purchased this land at Denmark and began milling lumber and making carriages with a portable steam mill. When that mill was destroyed by fire in 1894 it was replaced by the current building. He was joined by his brother Thomas, a house builder, until 1910 and began producing sashes, doors and gingerbread. Alexander was joined by his son Wilfred in 1930. Alexander retired in 1940 and Wilfred in 1958.

The mill became a museum in 1970 and it was adopted into the Nova Scotia Museum Complex in 1975. In 2026, the government of Nova Scotia announced that the Sutherland Steam Mill Museum would be permanently closed.
