= Denmark, Nova Scotia =

Community in Nova Scotia, Canada

Coordinates: 45°42′24″N 63°9′37″W

Denmark in Nova Scotia

Denmark is an unincorporated community in the Canadian province of Nova Scotia, located in Colchester County. The community is named after Denmark in Northern Europe, presumably because an early settler immigrated to the area from there.

The area was a part of a land grant given to the Anglican church and may have been settled around 1820. A railway station was opened in Denmark following the completion of the Oxford-Pictou section of the Short Line Railway on July 14th, 1890. Passenger service on the railway ended on November 20th, 1960. A post office was established in Denmark sometime before 1914.

The Sutherland Steam Mill Museum is located in Denmark.
