= Atlantic Canada Aviation Museum =

- Location within Nova Scotia
- Established: 1977
- Location: Halifax, Nova Scotia
- Coordinates: 44.8772°N 63.5333°W
- Type: Aviation museum
- Website: acamuseum.ca

The Atlantic Canada Aviation Museum is an aerospace museum located in Halifax, Nova Scotia, Canada near the Halifax Stanfield International Airport.

== History ==
The museum was established in 1977 by a group of volunteers. It opened to the public in 1985 and was granted "Local Museum" status by the Government of Nova Scotia in 1989. A 14,000 square foot hangar was built in 1995. In 1997, the museum recovered a TBM Avenger that crashed while performing aerial spraying in 1975.

== Exhibits ==
The museum features a number of exhibits that include CP-107 and Link trainers, a model of Halifax Civic Airport, and an original V-1 flying bomb. A flight simulator based on a Boeing 737NG was installed in July 2023.

== Aircraft on display ==
- AEA Silver Dart – replica
- American Champion Citabria
- Avro Canada CF-100 Canuck
- Bell 47J-2 Ranger
- Bell 206
- Canadair CF-5A Freedom Fighter
- Canadair CF-104 Starfighter
- Canadair CT-133 Silver Star
- Canadair Sabre Mk.5
- Cessna L-19 Bird Dog
- Consolidated PBY-5A Catalina/Canso – under restoration
- de Havilland Canada CP-121 Tracker
- Ercoupe 415-C
- General Motors TBM Avenger
- Lincoln Sport Biplane
- Lockheed Jetstar
- McDonnell CF-101 Voodoo
- Piper PA-38 Tomahawk
- Pitts S-1C Special
- RotorWay Exec
- Scamp 1
- Scheibe L-Spatz 55

== See also ==
- List of aerospace museums
- List of museums in Nova Scotia
- Organization of Military Museums of Canada
- Military history of Canada
