= Balmoral, Maryland =

Unincorporated community in Maryland, United States

- Unincorporated community
- Location within Maryland
- Coordinates: 39°25′15″N 77°18′02″W
- Country: United States
- State: Maryland
- County: Frederick
- Elevation: 440 ft (130 m)
- Time zone: UTC−5 (Eastern (EST))
  - Summer (DST): UTC−4 (EDT)
- Area codes: 301 & 240
- GNIS feature ID: 1711978

Balmoral is an unincorporated community in Frederick County, Maryland, United States.
