= Clifton Museum Park =

Historic house in Nova Scotia, Canada

Coordinates: 44.988796°N 64.14166°W

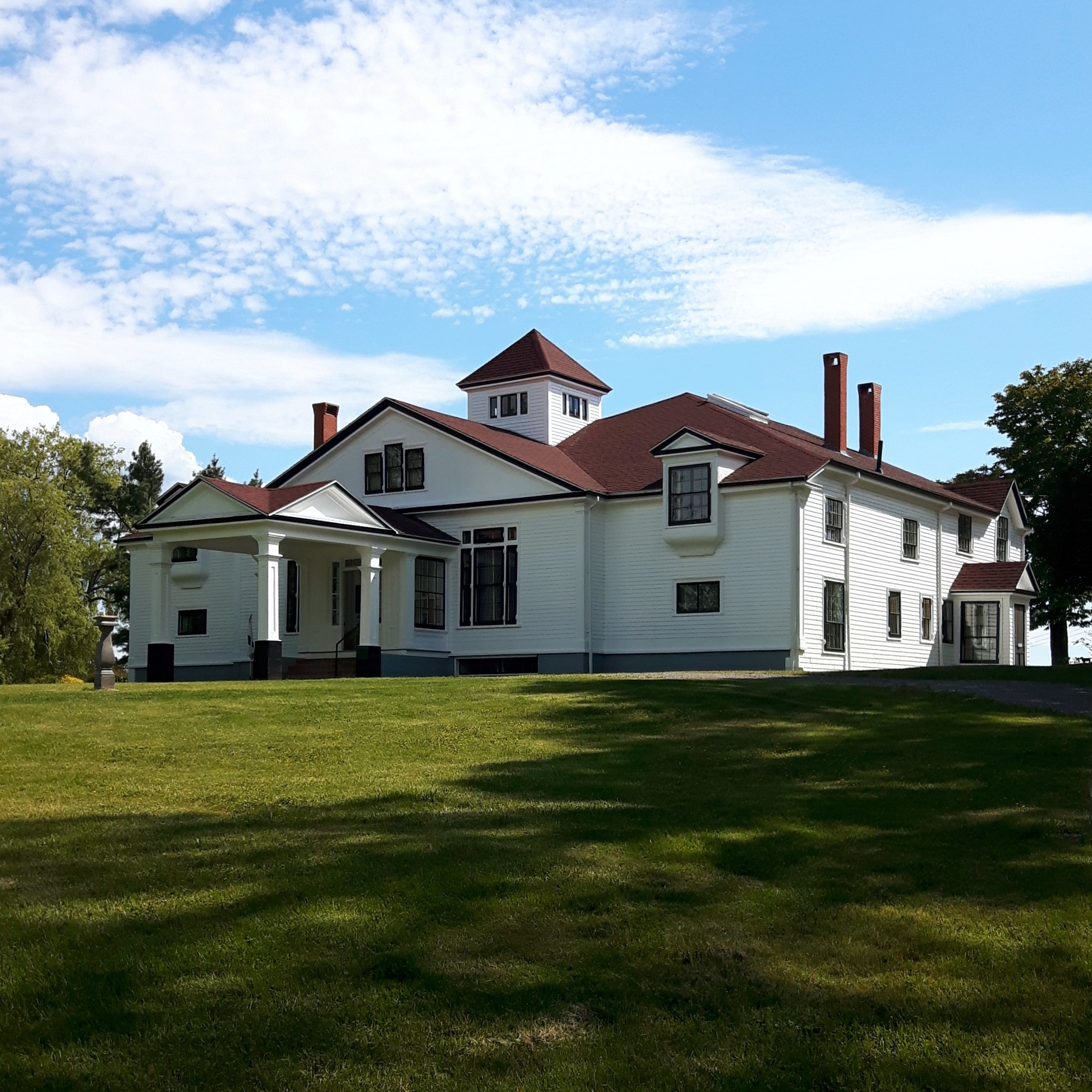
- Location: Windsor, Nova Scotia
- Type: Literary heritage building
- Website: Clifton Museum Park

Clifton Museum Park, formerly the Haliburton House Museum, is part of the Nova Scotia Museum system and is located in Windsor, Nova Scotia. It was built in the 1830s for Thomas Chandler Haliburton, a Windsor native who was one of Canada's first famous authors. His "Sam Slick" stories won him acclaim around the English-speaking world of the 1840s, and though Haliburton's famous character was fictitious, the home has also been referred to as the "Sam Slick House" informally for many years. The house was added to during Haliburton's time, but 16 successive owners also made major changes to the house until the 1920s. In 1939, the province acquired the home and in 1940 opened the site as the Haliburton Memorial Museum.

Though Haliburton auctioned off the property and the contents of the home when he left for England in 1856, the museum does have some furniture and artifacts that belonged to him, including his writing desk. Most of these items were procured by donation to the Nova Scotia Museum to coincide with the 1940 opening. The rest of the museum is furnished in period pieces from the museum's collection.

The museum is open to the public from June 1 - early October every year. The 34-acre park is open year-round.

== See also ==
- List of historic places in Hants County, Nova Scotia
