= Fort Point Lighthouse (Nova Scotia) =

Lighthouse in Nova Scotia, Canada

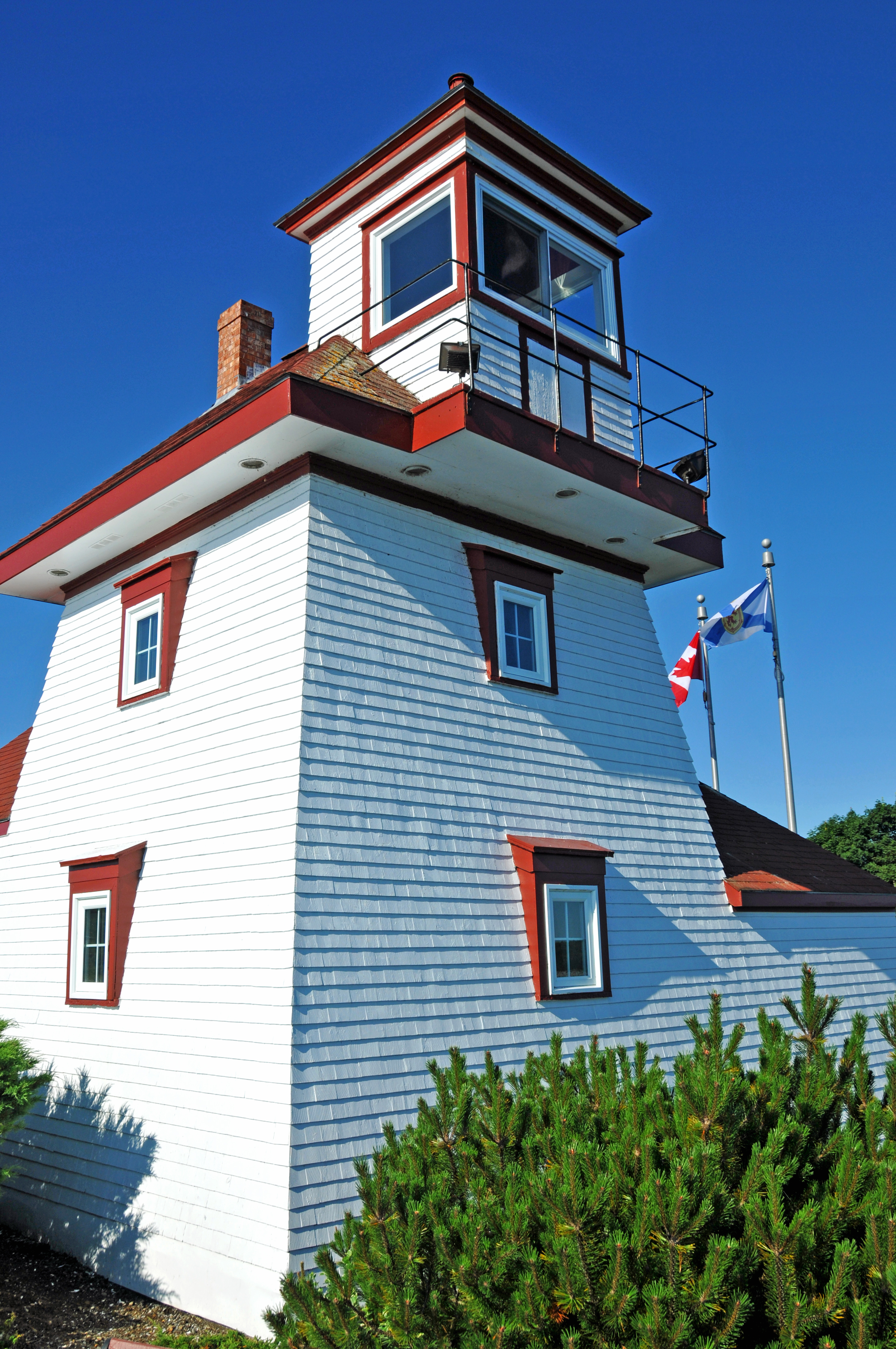
- Fort Point Lighthouse in 2011
- Location: Liverpool; Nova Scotia; Canada
- Coordinates: 44°02′39″N 64°42′28″W

Tower
- Constructed: 1855
- Construction: Wooden tower and lantern
- Height: 9 metres (30 ft)
- Shape: Square tower with balcony and lantern atop a 2-storey keeper’s house
- Markings: White tower, red trim and lantern roof
- Operator: Region of Queens Municipality
- Heritage: Provincially Registered Property
- Fog signal: Foghorn

Light
- First lit: 1856
- Deactivated: 1989

Fort Point Lighthouse is a lighthouse located on the Mersey River outside the town of Liverpool in the Canadian province of Nova Scotia. Constructed in 1855, the lighthouse sits amongst the remnants of a colonial battery.

The site of the lighthouse played an integral role in the historical defense of Liverpool. During the eighteenth century Fort Point had a signal station and during the American Revolutionary War a palisade was erected and fitted with cannons to defend the harbour from privateers.

The lighthouse is the modern-day site of the Fort Point Lighthouse Interpretive Centre & Park which is operated by the Queens County Museum on behalf of the Region of Queens Municipality.

== See also ==
- List of lighthouses in Canada
