= Shubenacadie Tinsmith Museum =

Museum in Nova Scotia, Canada

- Museum logo

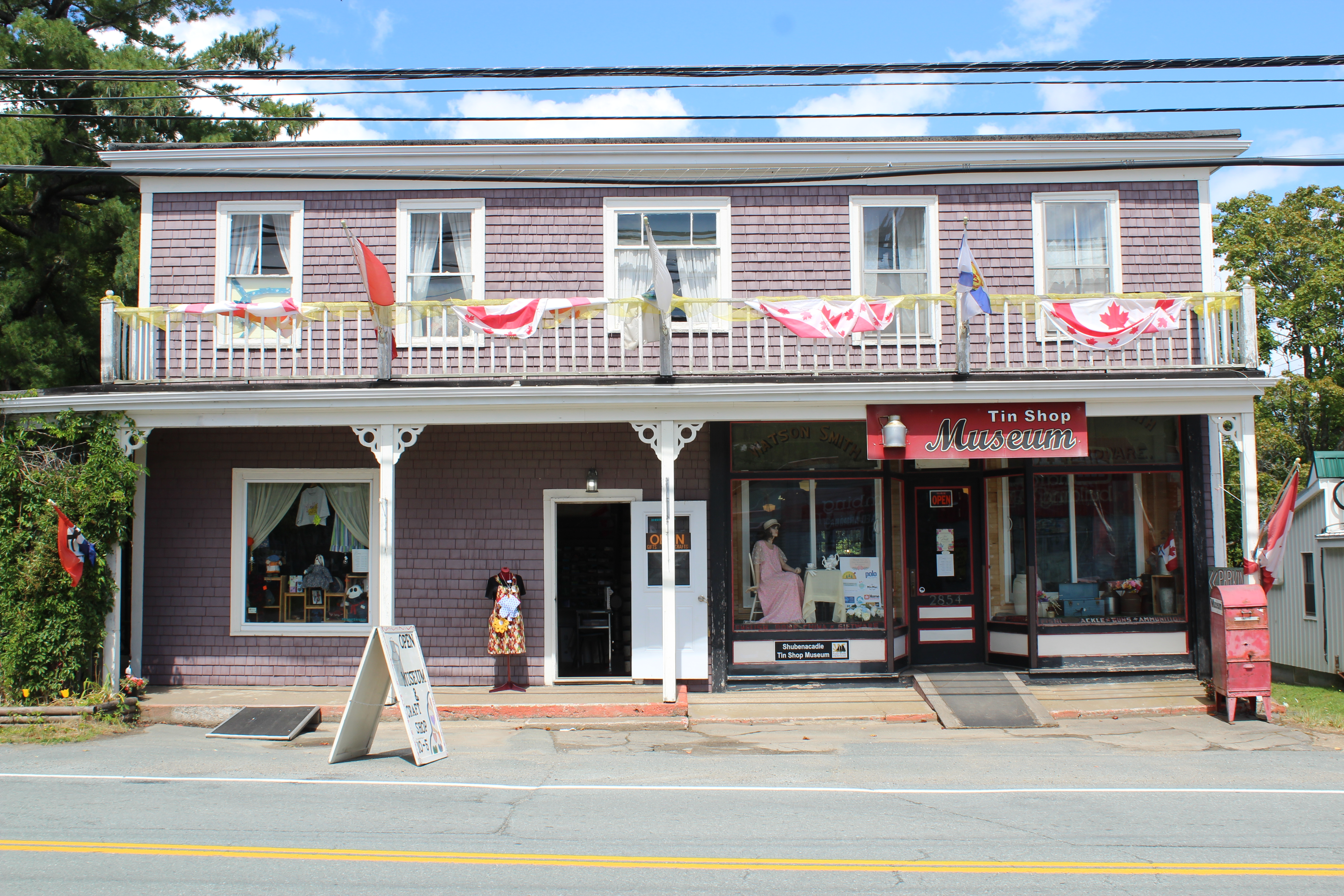
- The museum in August 2025
- Location: Shubenacadie, Nova Scotia, Canada
- Coordinates: 45.08881°N 63.40474°W
- Founder: Harry Smith
- Website: tinsmithmuseum.ca

The Shubenacadie Tinsmith Museum is a museum in the Canadian province of Nova Scotia, located in the community of Shubenacadie. Established by Watson Smith c. 1895 as Watson Smith & Sons Retail Hardware & Tin Shop, the shop produced over 60,000 milk cans before the cans became obsolete around the 1950s. The building opened to the public as a museum in 2003, after being donated to the Municipality of East Hants.

== History ==
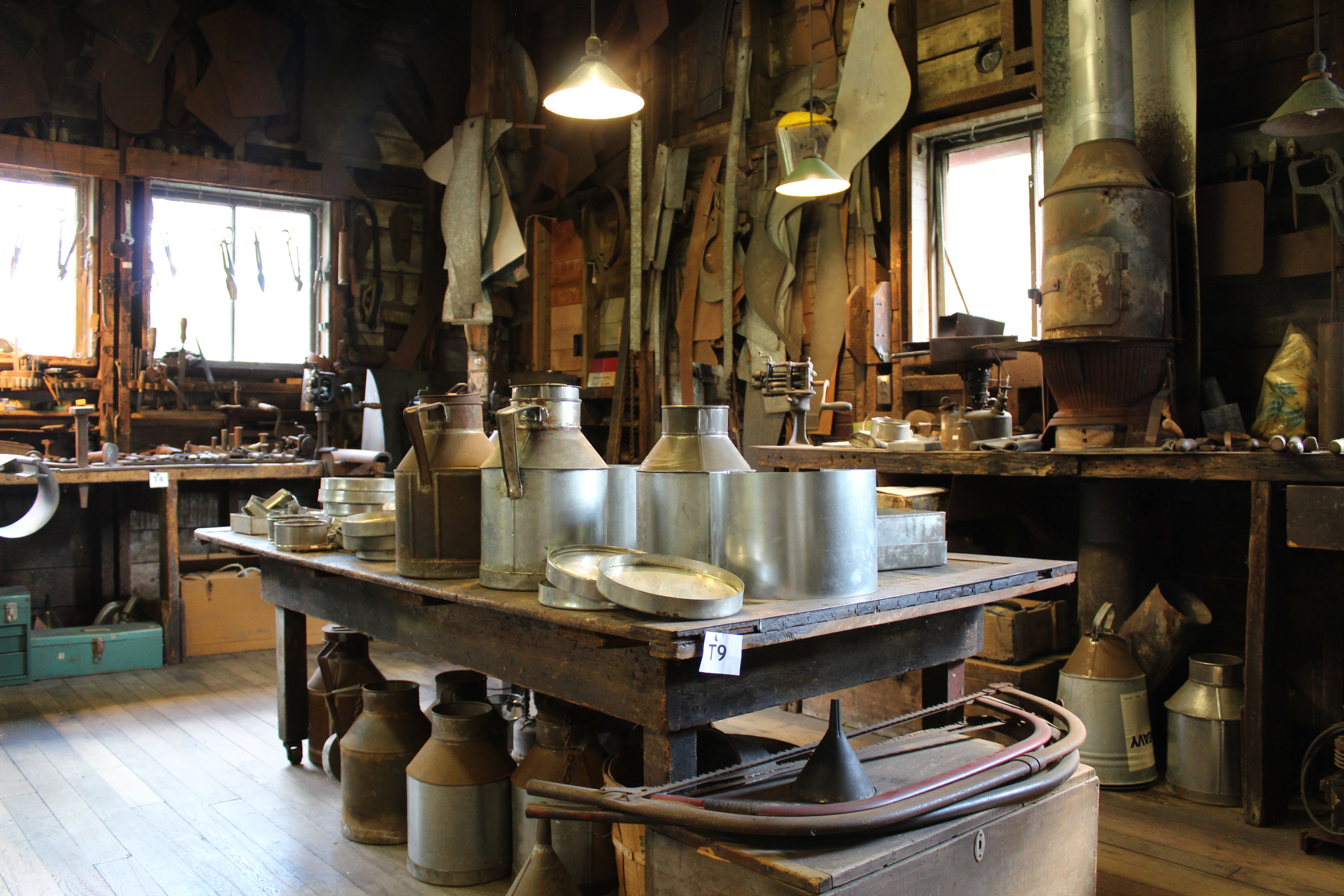
The tin shop is located in the rear of the museum

Watson Smith & Sons Retail Hardware & Tin Shop was established c. 1895 (Note: Some sources say the building was constructed in 1896 or 1894.) by Watson Smith on Main Street (Note: Later Nova Scotia Trunk 2.) in Shubenacadie, Nova Scotia. Smith held a patent for steel-bottom milk cans, and established the shop to supply the local dairy farmers. The front of the building contained the hardware store, with the rear of the building holding the tin shop. Watson's hardware store offered a variety of goods including hardware, china, guns and ammunition, fishing supplies, and custom-made tinware produced in the shop. The building also served as the residence for Smith and his wife, Jeanette. It was extended twice: in 1902 and 1922. After the Halifax Explosion in 1917 destroyed the train depot in Halifax where milk cans were delivered, the tin shop stepped in to fulfill the needs of the city, with seven people producing 75 milk cans per day. The tin shop produced roughly 3,000 milk cans in 1930.

Watson Smith's son, Harry Smith, was born in an upstairs room of the residence in 1903, and took over the tin shop when his father died in 1953. By then, they had produced over 60,000 milk cans, but stainless steel tanker trucks capable of transporting milk in bulk rendered milk cans obsolete. As a result of declining demand for milk cans, the tin shop began to falter. The hardware store, run by Watson's other son Cullen, also struggled due to competition from a new Home Hardware store across the street.

Harry Smith and the tin shop were featured on the television series On the Road Again with Wayne Rostad in February 1989. After the episode aired, Smith received a significant amount of letters and phone calls from across Canada, with many wanting him to make them a milk can as a collector's item. He made several milk cans in 1989, with some going to Manitoba, Alberta, and the U.S. state of Oregon.

Harry Smith began opening the tin shop to visitors on Sundays in the 1980s. In the late 1990s, he donated the property to the Municipality of East Hants to be operated as a museum. In 2001, at the age of 98, he donated $60,000 (Note: (equivalent to $100,736 in 2025)) to construct 200 metres (660 ft) of sidewalks in the village core of Shubenacadie. He died in 2002, and the museum opened to the public in 2003.
