= Balmoral, Tennessee =

- Unincorporated community
- Location within Tennessee Location within the United States
- Coordinates: 35°06′26″N 85°20′48″W
- Country: United States
- State: Tennessee
- County: Hamilton
- Elevation: 1,260 ft (380 m)
- Time zone: UTC-5 (Eastern (EST))
  - Summer (DST): UTC-4 (EDT)
- Area code: 423
- GNIS feature ID: 1276249

Balmoral is an unincorporated community in Hamilton County, Tennessee, United States.
