= Shand House Museum =

Historic house in Nova Scotia, Canada

Coordinates: 44.991816°N 64.142625°W

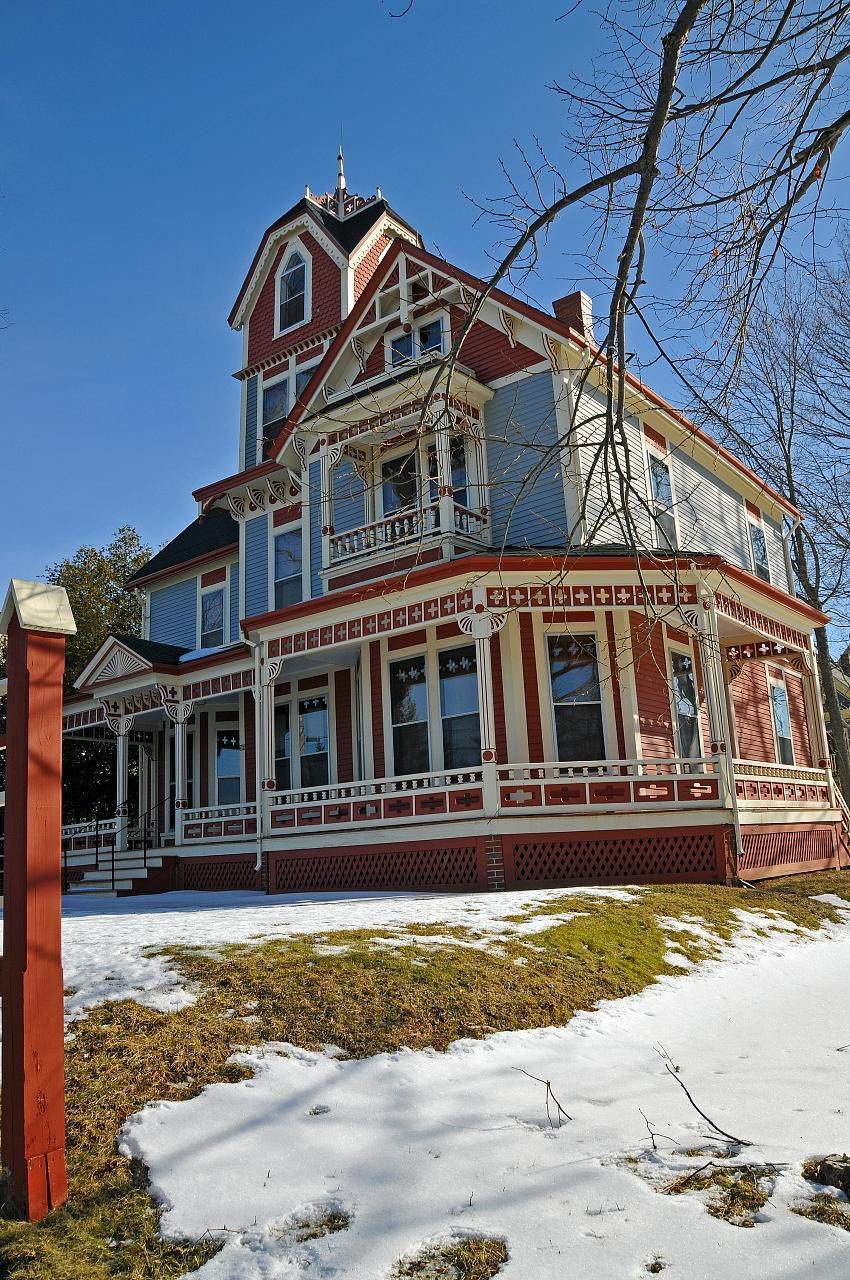
- Shand House Museum
- Established: 1948
- Location: 389 Avon Street; Windsor, Nova Scotia, Canada
- Type: Heritage Building
- Website: shandhouse.novascotia.ca

The Shand House Museum is part of the Nova Scotia Museum. Located in Windsor, Nova Scotia, it was built in 1890-91 for Clifford and Henrie Shand. It is a Queen Anne Revival style late-Victorian Era home, and most of its elaborate machine-made trim features are still intact. It contains most of the original family's belongings, including furniture, dishes, artwork, toys, photos and books which date to the turn of the century. Many pieces of the home's furniture were made at the nearby Windsor Furniture Factory, which was in operation in the late 19th and early 20th century Windsor. Unusually for its time, the home was constructed with an indoor plumbing, central heating, and was wired for electric lighting within a year of its completion.

Clifford Shand was a local businessman and early bicycle enthusiast (part of the bicycle craze of the 1890s). His father, Andrew P. Shand, was part-owner in the Windsor Furniture Factory, and craftsmen from the factory made not only much of the furniture, but most of the elaborate trim that still decorates the inside of the house. Throughout the home there are many photos and trophies attesting to Clifford's bicycling exploits, as well as many paintings done by his wife, Henrie.

Only four people ever lived in the home: Clifford and Henrie, and their two children, Errol B. Shand and Gwendolyn V. Shand. The house was donated to the Nova Scotia Museum by their daughter Gwendolyn, who lived in the house (though not continuously) until her death in 1982. The home was opened as a Museum in 1985.

While the family were noted local figures, the house is primarily maintained not as a memorial to the Shand family, but as a very well preserved example of the architectural, economic, and social history of 1890s Nova Scotia.

The museum was open by appointment in 2019.
