= Leminster, Nova Scotia =

Community in Nova Scotia, Canada

Coordinates: 44°49′18.43″N 64°17′34.88″W

Leminster in Nova Scotia

Leminster is a community in the Canadian province of Nova Scotia, located in West Hants Regional Municipality.
