= Kempt Shore, Nova Scotia =

Community in Nova Scotia, Canada

Kempt Shore
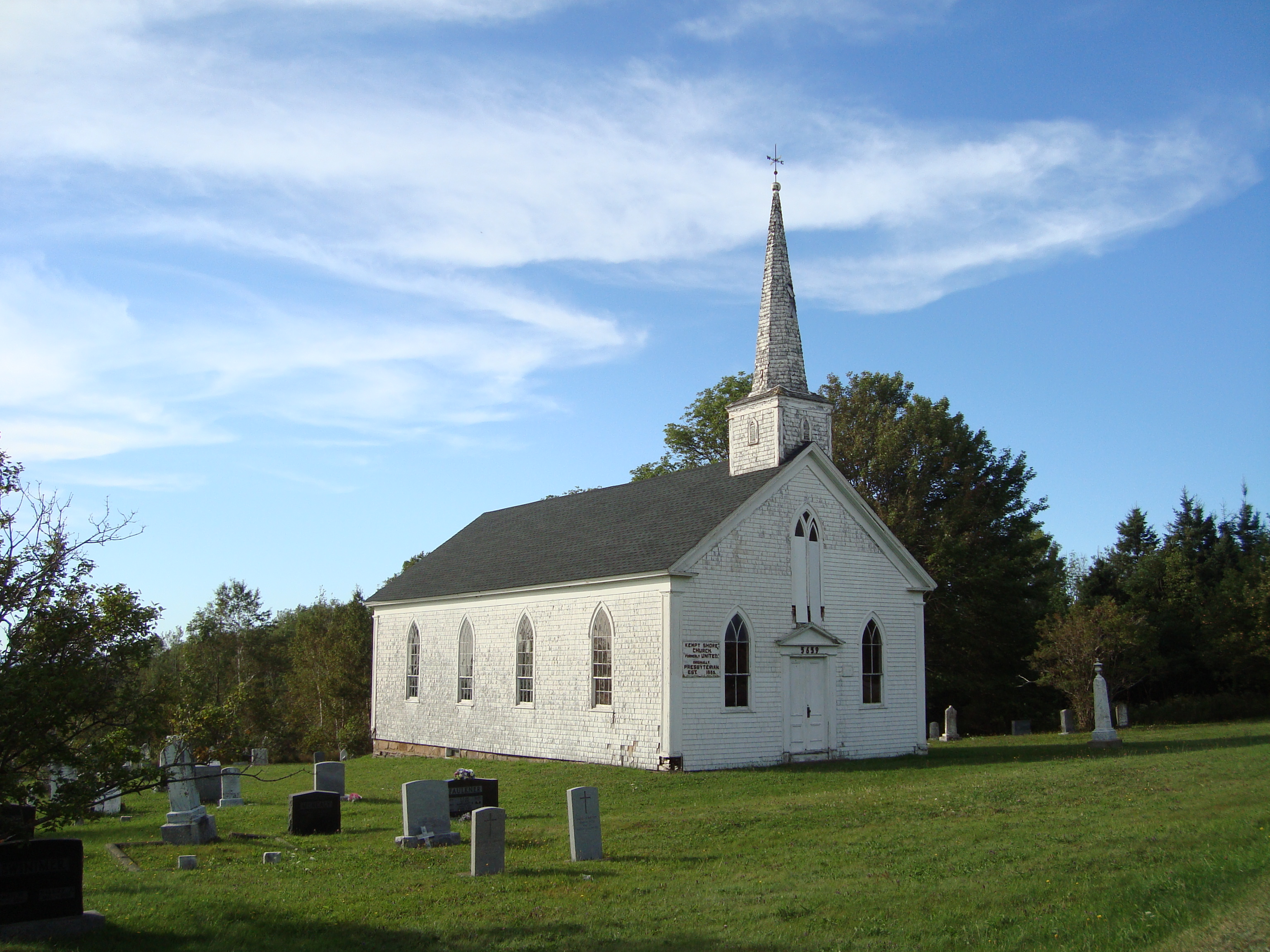
- Church in Kempt Shore

- Location within Nova Scotia
- Coordinates: 45°08′04″N 64°11′29″W
- Country: Canada
- Province: Nova Scotia
- Municipality: West Hants
- Named for: James Kempt
- Time zone: UTC-4 (AST)
  - Summer (DST): UTC-3 (ADT)
- Postal code: B0N 2A0
- Area code: 902
- GNBC Code: CASUH

Kempt Shore is an unincorporated community in the Canadian province of Nova Scotia, located in West Hants Regional Municipality in Hants County. The community is situated at the mouth of the Avon River, overlooking the Minas Basin. The namesake of Kempt Shore is James Kempt, who served as Lieutenant Governor of Nova Scotia from 1820 – 1828.

There were a small number of Acadian families living in the area prior to the Expulsion in 1755. British settlers arrived to take over the lands in the early 19th Century.

Kempt Shore has hosted the Acoustic Maritime Music Festival.
