= Balmoral Grist Mill Museum =

Coordinates: 45°38′36.5″N 63°11′36.1″W

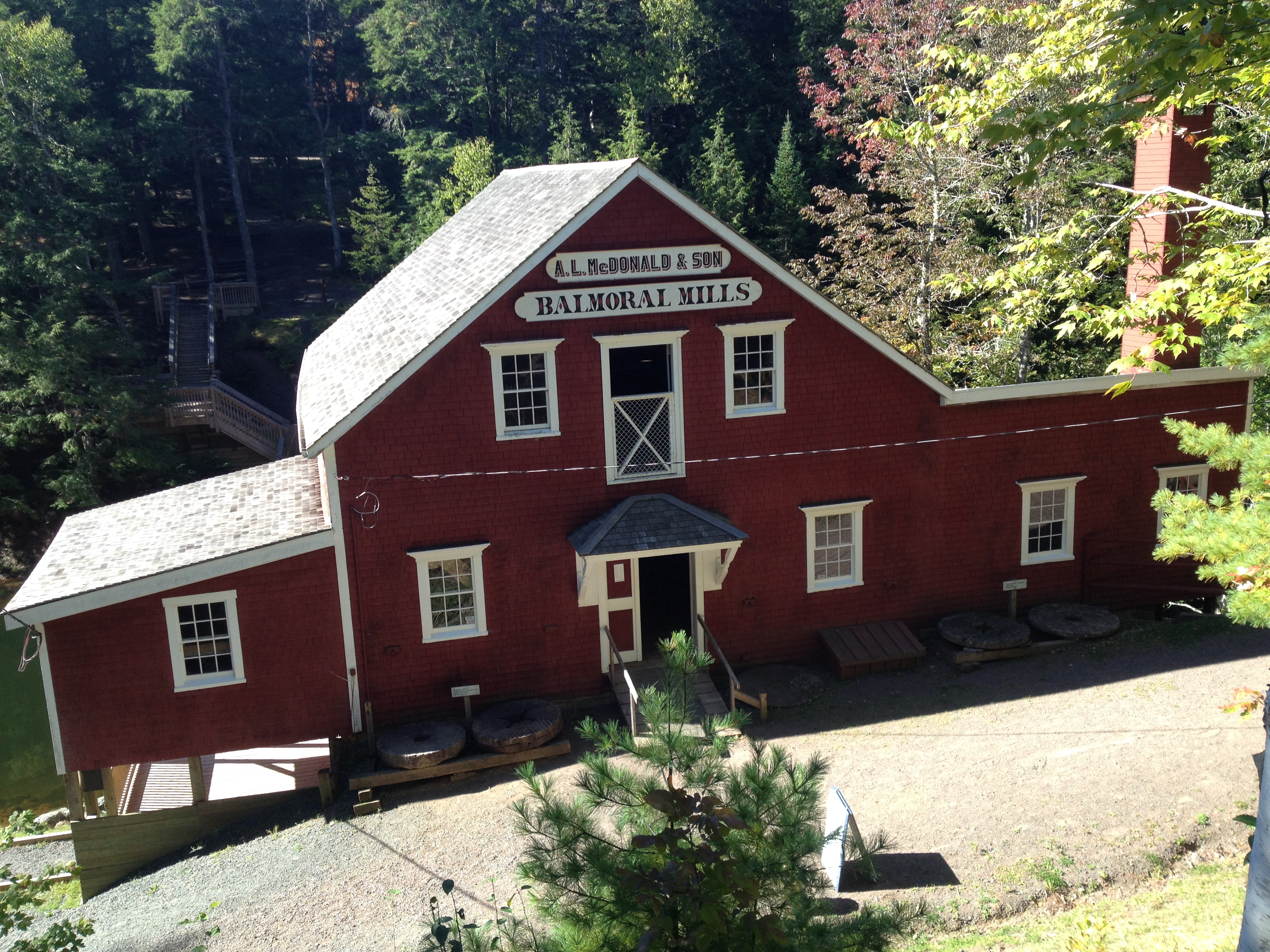
- Established: 1874
- Location: Balmoral Mills, Nova Scotia
- Type: history museum
- Website: balmoralgristmill.novascotia.ca

The Balmoral Grist Mill Museum is a restored 1874 water-powered grist mill located in Balmoral Mills, Nova Scotia. The site includes a 1 kilometre (0.62 mi) walking trail along the ravine of Balmoral Brook. The mill is part of the Nova Scotia Museum system. It could be used to grind wheat, oats, and buckwheat into flour and meal.

== History ==
The mill was built in 1874 by Alexander McKay, the son of Scottish immigrants. He purchased the land for the mill for $12. He utilized a new technology for the time, the water turbine, to drive four grindstones. When Alexander died in 1886, the mill passed to his son, Hugh.

Hugh sold the mill 20 years later to Alexander McLean MacDonald. MacDonald passed the mill to his son Archie in 1940. In the 1950s, the mill, facing competition from larger modern mills, shut down.

In 1964, the Sunrise Trail Museum in Tatamagouche began the process of restoring the mill, hiring the former owner, Archie MacDonald to run the mill. Due to financial constraints, the mill was sold to the Nova Scotia government in 1966. The government restored the mill and added an electric motor to drive the mill stones in place of the turbine that once provided power.

== See also ==
- List of museums in Nova Scotia
