= Uniacke Estate Museum Park =

Coordinates: 44.90224°N 63.84084°W

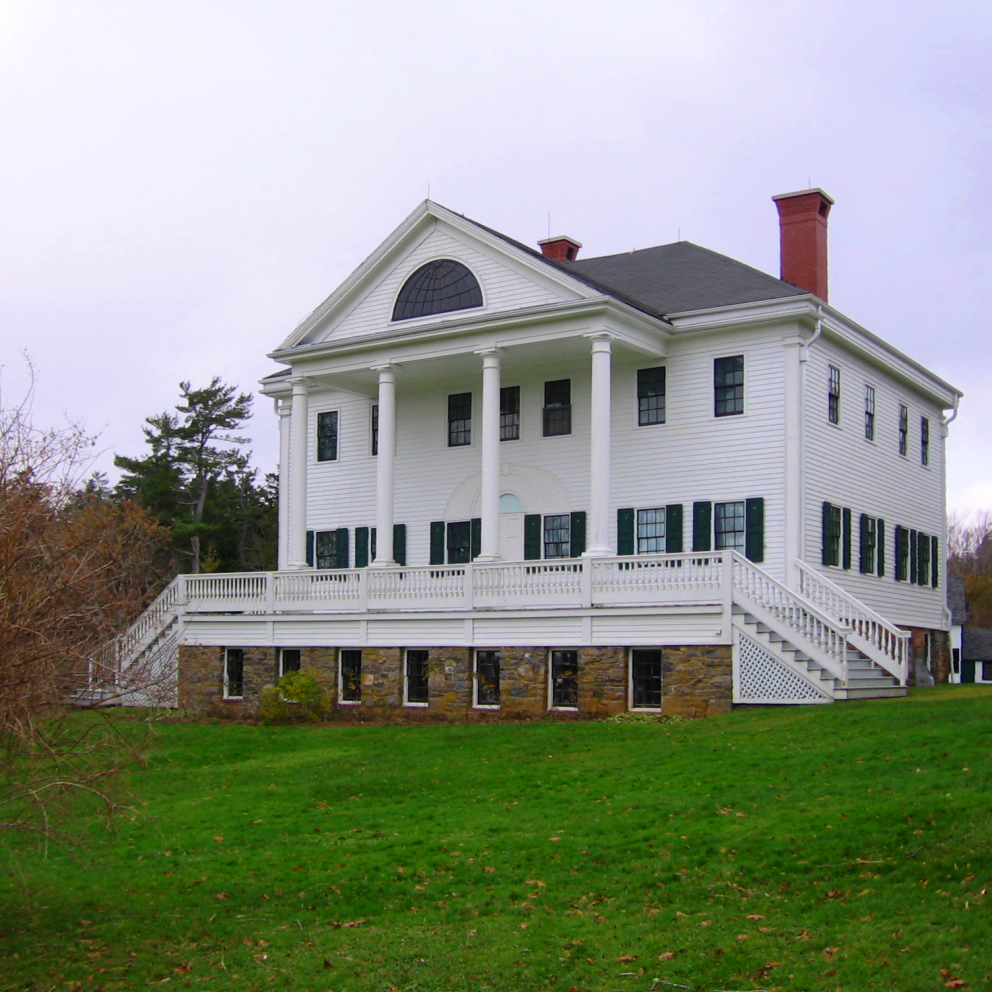
- Location: Mount Uniacke, Nova Scotia
- Type: Heritage house museum
- Website: uniacke.novascotia.ca

Uniacke Estate Museum Park is the historic home and preserved estate of Richard John Uniacke at Mount Uniacke (c.1813). The Uniacke Estate is part of the Nova Scotia Museum system.

== History ==
The estate was built as a country residence for Richard John Uniacke, Nova Scotia's Attorney-General during the War of 1812. Located along the "Post Road", the original road between Halifax and Windsor, the site was, according to Uniacke's family, selected in 1776 while Uniacke was being taken to Halifax in chains to face a treason trial for siding with the rebels in the Battle of Fort Cumberland. Uniacke glimpsed the lake and hillside setting and vowed that he would build his home here. Uniacke was released under a leniency policy, and when his career prospered, he acquired the land for his estate. Construction of the house began in 1813 and was completed in 1818. Uniacke had a town house in Halifax, but spent most of his time living and entertaining at the estate until his death at the house in 1830. The house remained in the Uniacke family with few changes until it was purchased by the Nova Scotia government in 1949. It first opened to the public as a museum on June 2, 1952. Today the house is open seasonally as part of the Nova Scotia Museum with a carefully restored interior and a tea room. The estate is open year-round with an extensive network of trails that interpret the historic landscape of the park, including a preserved 2.5 km section of the old Halifax to Windsor road from the stage coach era, now part of a hiking trail.

The interior of the house includes portraits which belonged in the Uniacke family by the leading American artists of the era:

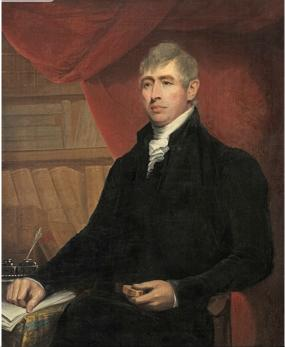
Richard John Uniacke by Robert Field

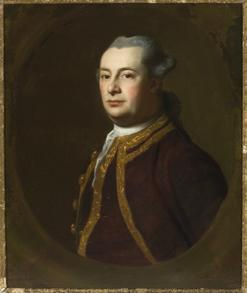
Lieutenant Governor of Nova Scotia Michael Francklin by John Singleton Copley (1762)

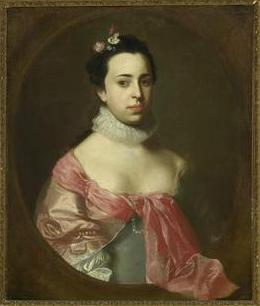
Susannah (Boutineau) Franklin (1762) by John Singleton Copley (wife of Michael Franklin; grandchild of Peter Faneuil)

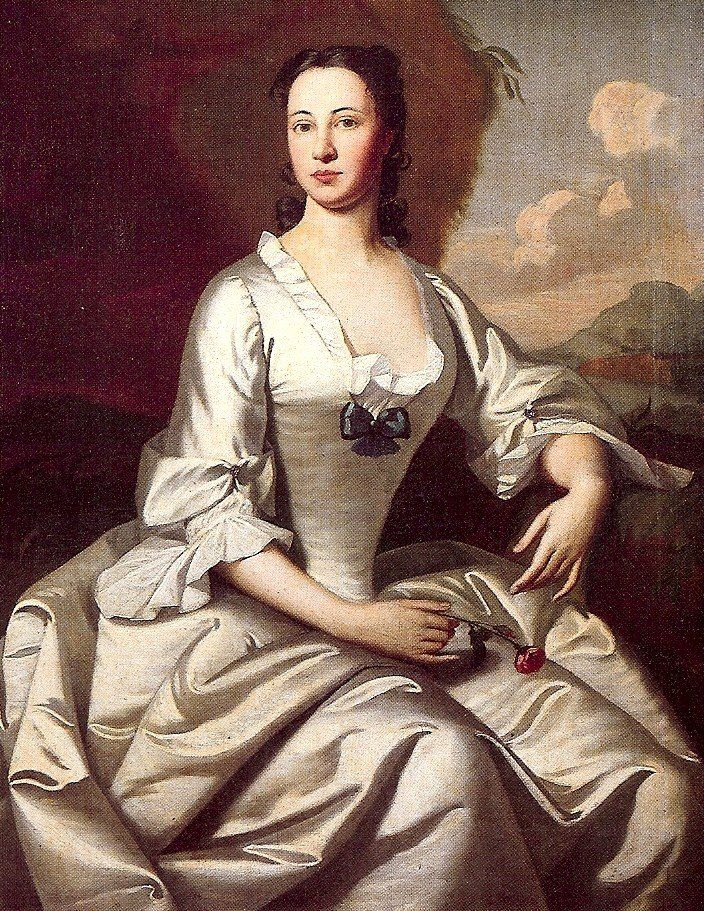
Susannah Boutineau by Robert Feke (1748), (mother-in-law of Michael Franklin)

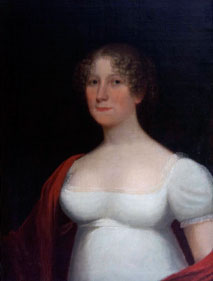
Alicia Uniacke (daughter of Richard John Uniacke) by Robert Field (painter)

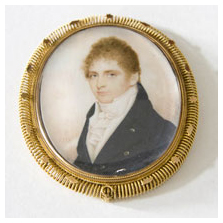
Richard John Uniacke, Jr. (son of Richard John Uniacke) by Robert Field (painter)
- The portraits of the Francklins accompanied the newlywed couple to Nova Scotia in 1762 and remained in the province until 1927. Michael's portrait was purchased for the Nova Scotia Museum collection in 1982. The two portraits were reunited at Uniacke House after the acquisition of Susanna's portrait in 2004.
- James Boutineau by Robert Feke (1748), (father-in-law of Michael Franklin)

== See also ==
- List of historic places in Hants County, Nova Scotia
- List of oldest buildings in Canada
