= Balmoral Mills =

Community in Nova Scotia, Canada

Coordinates: 45°38′49.81″N 63°11′47.22″W

Balmoral Mills in Nova Scotia

Balmoral Mills (Muillean Bhaile Mhoireil) is an unincorporated community in the Canadian province of Nova Scotia, located in Colchester County. It is home to the Balmoral Grist Mill Museum as well as its own provincial park.
