= Mount Uniacke, Nova Scotia =

Community in Nova Scotia, Canada

Mount Uniacke
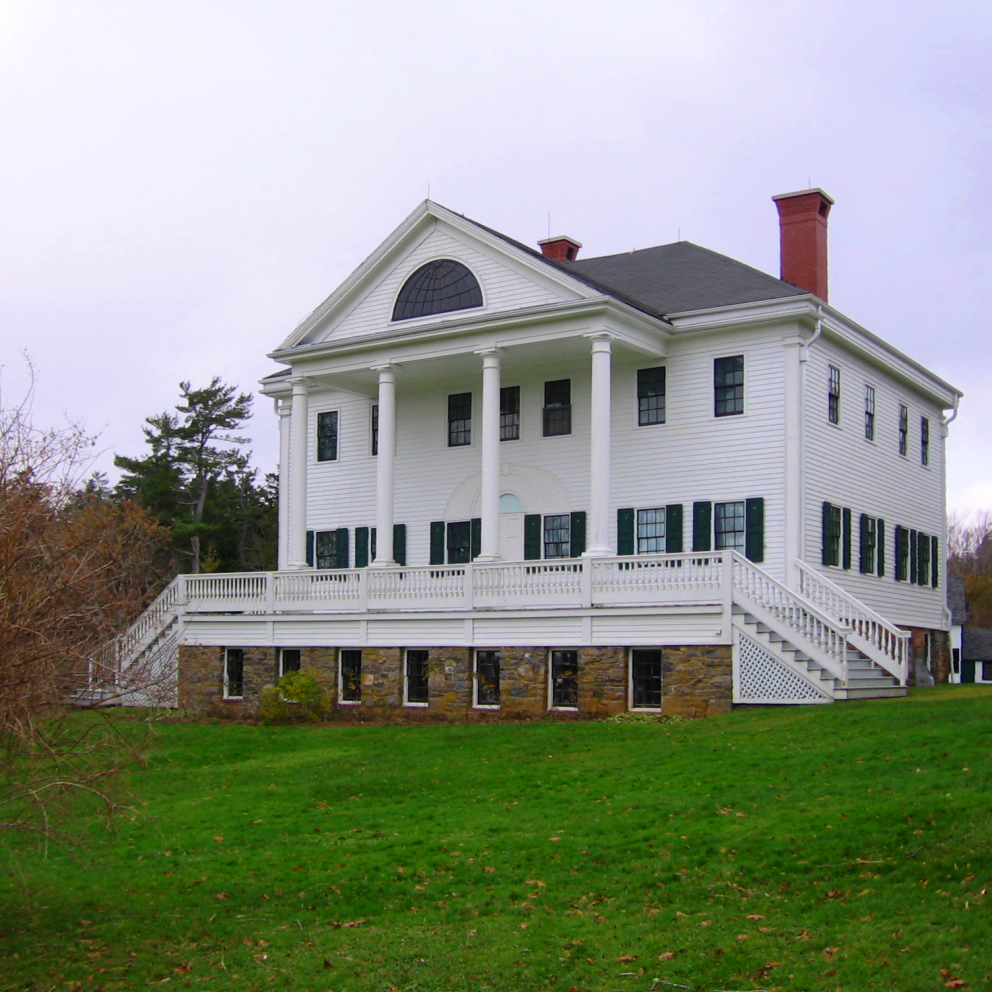
- Uniacke House, part of the Uniacke Estate Museum Park.

- Location in Nova Scotia
- Coordinates: 44°53′31″N 63°49′35″W
- Country: Canada
- Province: Nova Scotia
- Municipality: Hants County

Population (2011)
  - Total: 3,501
- Time zone: UTC-4 (AST)
  - Summer (DST): UTC-3 (ADT)
- Area code: 902

Mount Uniacke is an unincorporated community in the Canadian province of Nova Scotia, located in East Hants Municipality in Hants County. It lies about 40 km to the north of Halifax.

== History ==
Mount Uniacke is home to the Uniacke Estate Museum Park, the one time summer residence of Richard John Uniacke, former Attorney General of Nova Scotia in the 19th century.

Mount Uniacke was a popular area for the train riders of the time. Originally, an inn was placed in Mount Uniacke; however, the inn burned down in the 1970s. Another large hotel, the Parker Hotel, was located in Mount Uniacke. After the Parker Hotel was removed, a house was built. The house was abandoned and was eventually torn down. A mine was discovered on 18 June 1865 by Mr. Uniacke. The mine was in production from 1867 to 1941.

== Climate ==
Mount Uniacke has a humid continental climate (Dfb). Summers tend to be warmer and winters tend to be colder because of the community's location away from the coast. The climate is very wet year round, with almost half of all days receiving some form of precipitation.

Climate data for Mount Uniacke (1981–2010)
Month	Jan	Feb	Mar	Apr	May	Jun	Jul	Aug	Sep	Oct	Nov	Dec	Year
Record high °C (°F)	15.6 (60.1)	18.0 (64.4)	26.5 (79.7)	25.6 (78.1)	33.0 (91.4)	33.3 (91.9)	34.0 (93.2)	35.0 (95.0)	31.7 (89.1)	27.8 (82.0)	21.7 (71.1)	16.7 (62.1)	35.0 (95.0)
Mean daily maximum °C (°F)	−1.5 (29.3)	−0.6 (30.9)	3.0 (37.4)	8.8 (47.8)	15.5 (59.9)	20.5 (68.9)	23.9 (75.0)	23.3 (73.9)	18.9 (66.0)	12.8 (55.0)	6.8 (44.2)	1.3 (34.3)	11.1 (52.0)
Daily mean °C (°F)	−6.5 (20.3)	−5.6 (21.9)	−1.7 (28.9)	4.1 (39.4)	9.7 (49.5)	14.7 (58.5)	18.2 (64.8)	17.7 (63.9)	13.7 (56.7)	8.1 (46.6)	2.9 (37.2)	−3.0 (26.6)	6.0 (42.8)
Mean daily minimum °C (°F)	−11.5 (11.3)	−10.6 (12.9)	−6.5 (20.3)	−0.7 (30.7)	3.9 (39.0)	8.8 (47.8)	12.5 (54.5)	12.1 (53.8)	8.4 (47.1)	3.3 (37.9)	−0.9 (30.4)	−7.3 (18.9)	1.0 (33.8)
Record low °C (°F)	−35.0 (−31.0)	−37.2 (−35.0)	−27.8 (−18.0)	−25.0 (−13.0)	−8.9 (16.0)	−4.4 (24.1)	0.6 (33.1)	−1.1 (30.0)	−6.7 (19.9)	−11.1 (12.0)	−18.3 (−0.9)	−27.2 (−17.0)	−37.2 (−35.0)
Average precipitation mm (inches)	169.7 (6.68)	124.0 (4.88)	141.4 (5.57)	117.6 (4.63)	116.4 (4.58)	98.3 (3.87)	98.2 (3.87)	89.6 (3.53)	119.8 (4.72)	128.0 (5.04)	160.4 (6.31)	151.7 (5.97)	1,515.1 (59.65)
Average rainfall mm (inches)	97.8 (3.85)	70.8 (2.79)	93.6 (3.69)	99.1 (3.90)	113.5 (4.47)	98.3 (3.87)	98.2 (3.87)	89.6 (3.53)	119.8 (4.72)	127.7 (5.03)	138.8 (5.46)	96.8 (3.81)	1,244.1 (48.98)
Average snowfall cm (inches)	71.9 (28.3)	53.1 (20.9)	47.8 (18.8)	18.6 (7.3)	2.9 (1.1)	0.0 (0.0)	0.0 (0.0)	0.0 (0.0)	0.0 (0.0)	0.3 (0.1)	21.6 (8.5)	55.0 (21.7)	271.1 (106.7)
Average precipitation days (≥ 0.2 mm)	17.0	12.9	13.5	14.8	16.0	14.3	13.0	12.5	13.8	14.5	17.3	16.6	175.9
Average rainy days (≥ 0.2 mm)	8.0	6.1	8.6	13.0	15.9	14.3	13.0	12.5	13.8	14.4	15.1	9.2	143.6
Average snowy days (≥ 0.2 cm)	11.7	9.1	7.2	3.8	0.53	0.0	0.0	0.0	0.0	0.15	3.6	9.7	45.7
Source: Environment Canada

== Notable people ==
- Buck 65, Canadian hip hop artist
