= List of oldest buildings in Canada =

This is a list of the oldest surviving buildings and structures of significance in each province and territory of Canada.

== Alberta ==
First Nations peoples in Alberta were generally nomadic and did not create permanent structures, however they did often occupy the same site annually for many generations, and created permanent markers in the form of tipi rings and medicine wheels. The first Europeans to build in Alberta were the fur traders of the North West Company who constructed the first trading posts in Alberta at Fort Chipewyan and Fort Vermilion in 1788. Few buildings from the fur trade era remain.

There is said to be 25 buildings built prior to 1882 still surviving in Alberta. Most buildings considered "historic" in Alberta are from the post-railway era (e.g. after 1885 in Calgary, after 1891 in Edmonton).

The following is a list of oldest buildings and structures in Alberta constructed prior to 1900.

Building or complex	Built	Location	Architect
Father Lacombe Chapel	1861	St. Albert	Fr. Albert Lacombe
Clerk's Quarters	1865	Fort Victoria	George Flett
Rocky Mountain House Chimneys	1868	Rocky Mountain House	Hudson's Bay Company
Hunt House	1876	Calgary	Hudson's Bay Company
C.O. Card House	1887	Cardston	
Lougheed House	1891	Calgary	James & Isabella Lougheed
Ralph Connor Church	1891	Canmore	
John Walter house	1875	Edmonton	
Lac La Biche Convent	1894	Lac La Biche	Oblates of Mary Immaculate
Roland Michener House	1894	Lacombe	
Union Bank	1899	Fort Macleod	David Grier

== British Columbia ==
The following is a list of oldest buildings and structures in British Columbia constructed prior to 1900.

Building	Built	City	Architect
Fort Langley storehouse	1840s	Fort Langley	
Fort Kamloops log cabin	1840s	Kamloops	
St. Ann's schoolhouse	1844	Victoria	
Tod House	1851	Oak Bay	
Helmcken House	1852	Victoria	
Craigflower Manor	1853–1856	View Royal	Hudson's Bay Company
The Bastion	1853-55	Nanaimo	Hudson's Bay Company
Craigflower Schoolhouse	1855	Saanich, British Columbia	
Bannockburn Farm	1857	Saanichton	
St. John the Divine Church	1859	Maple Ridge	
Father Pandosy Mission	1859	Kelowna	
Victoria Hotel	1859	Victoria, British Columbia	
Dodd House	1859	Saanich	
1314 Wharf Street	1860	Victoria	
536 Yates Street,	1860	Victoria	
Fisgard Lighthouse	1860	Victoria	
Race Rocks Lighthouse	1860	Great Race Rock	
Christ Anglican Church	1861	Hope, British Columbia	
Woodlands House (original section)	1861	Victoria, British Columbia	
Trutch House	1861	Victoria, British Columbia	
Point Ellice House	1861	Victoria, British Columbia	
1129 Wharf Street	1862	Victoria, British Columbia	
Odd Fellows Hall	1862	Victoria, British Columbia	
Wentworth House	1862	Victoria, British Columbia	
Emily Carr House	1863	Victoria, British Columbia	
Congregation Emanu-El	1863	Victoria, British Columbia	
Reid Block	1863	Victoria, British Columbia	
St. John the Divine Church	1863	Yale, British Columbia	
Old St. Andrews Presbyterian Church	1863	New Westminster, British Columbia	
Irving House	1865	New Westminster, British Columbia	OldestBuilding in New Westminster
Hastings Mill Store	1865	Vancouver, British Columbia	Oldest building in Vancouver
Ross Bay Villa	1865	Victoria, British Columbia	
557-559 Johnson Street	1875	Victoria, British Columbia	
Old Victoria Customs House	1875	Victoria, British Columbia	
Church of Our Lord	1876	Victoria, British Columbia	
Masonic Temple	1878	Victoria, British Columbia	
St. Joseph's Hospital	1878	Victoria, British Columbia	
Grand Pacific Hotel	1879	Victoria, British Columbia	

== Manitoba ==
The following is a list of buildings and structures in Manitoba constructed prior to 1900.

Building	Built	City	Architect	Image
Prince of Wales Fort	1731-41	near Churchill	Royal Engineers	
Inkster's General Store	1831	Winnipeg, Manitoba		
Lower Fort Garry	1831 to 1848	near Selkirk, Manitoba	Hudson's Bay Company	
Big House, (Lower Fort Garry)	1832	near Selkirk, Manitoba Hudson's Bay Company		
Fur Loft (Lower Fort Garry)	1832	near Selkirk, Manitoba Hudson's Bay Company		
William Fraser House	1835	near Selkirk, Manitoba		
The Archway Warehouse	1840–1841	Norway House		
St Andrews on the Red	1845–1849	RM of St Andrews		
Grey Nuns' Convent (Le Musée de Saint-Boniface Museum)	1845–1851	St. Boniface (Winnipeg)		
Seven Oaks House Museum	1851	Winnipeg	John Inkster	
Ross House Museum	1852	Winnipeg		
Old St. James Anglican Church	1853	Winnipeg, Manitoba		
St. Peter Dynevor Anglican Church	1853	R. M. St. Clements		
Upper Fort Garry Gate	1853	Winnipeg		
Kildonan Presbyterian Church	1854	Winnipeg, Manitoba		
St. Andrews Rectory	1854	RM of St Andrews		
Brown House	1856	Winnipeg, Manitoba		
Delorme house	1857	Winnipeg, Manitoba		
Miss Davis’ School / Twin Oaks	1858	R.M. of St. Andrews		
St. Peter's Dynevor Anglican Church Rectory	1860	R.M. of St. Andrews		
St. Clement's Anglican Church	1861	RM of St. Andrews		
Firth House / Hay House	1861	R.M. of St. Andrews		
Barber House	1862	Winnipeg		
Bunn House	1862	Selkirk		
Cox House	1862	St. Andrew's, Manitoba		
St. Anne's Anglican Church	1862–1864	RM of Portage la Prairie		
Archbishop of St. Boniface residence	1864	Winnipeg		
Kildonan School	1865	Winnipeg		
Captain William Kennedy House	1866	St. Andrews, Manitoba		
Christ Anglican Church	1868–1870	Fort Alexander, Powerview, Manitoba,		
Colcleugh House	1872	Selkirk, Manitoba		
Inkster House	1874	Winnipeg		
Little Britain United Church	1874 (est. 1852)	R.M. of St. Andrews		
La Chapelle de Notre Dame Du Bons Secours	1875	Winnipeg		
St. Luke's Anglican Church	1876	Emerson, Manitoba		
St. Paul’s Anglican Church	1876 - 1880 (est. 1825)	Middlechurch, RM of West St. Paul		
All Saints Victoria Anglican Church	1877	R.M. of Rockwood		
Chartier House	1877	Morris	Flavien Chartier	
Episcopal Methodist Church / All Saints Anglican Church	1878	Dominion City Emerson, Manitoba		
Kittson House	1878	Winnipeg		
Nellie McClung House	1878	Pembina, Manitoba		
Reimer House	1878-1879	Hochfelt, Manitoba		
Carney House / Kelvinside	1880	Emerson, Manitoba		
Old Colony Mennonite Church	1880	Rosetown, Manitoba		
Riel House	1880–1881	St. Vital, Winnipeg		
Fairbanks House	1881	Emerson, Manitoba		
Johnson House	1881	Brandon, Manitoba		
Vaughan Street Gaol	1881	Winnipeg		
Winnipeg Hotel	1881	Winnipeg		
Church of the Ascension	1882	Stonewall, Manitoba		
T.W Taylor Building	1882	Winnipeg		
Hochman Building	1882	Winnipeg		
House of Comoy	1882	Winnipeg		
Monk House	1882	Winnipeg		
Sures Building	1882	Winnipeg		
Bernier house	1882	Winnipeg		
W.M. Ashdown House	1882	Winnipeg		
Telegram Building	1882	Winnipeg		
Bathgate Block	1882–1883	Winnipeg		
Fortune Block	1882–1883	Winnipeg		
Lyon Block/Bate Building	1883	Winnipeg		
Bryce House	1883	Emerson, Manitoba		
Daly House	1883	Brandon		
McDougall House	1883	St. Norbert, Winnipeg, Manitoba		
Deloraine Presbyterian Church	1883	Deloraine, Manitoba		
Smart Bag Company Building	1884–1913	Winnipeg		
Government House	1883	Winnipeg		
Brandon Court House	1884	Brandon		
Holy Trinity Anglican Church	1884	Winnipeg	Charles Wheeler	
Neepawa County Courthouse	1884	Neepawa	C. Osborn Wikenden	
St. Mary's Roman Catholic Cathedral	1887, updated 1896	Winnipeg, Manitoba		
Villa Louise	1888	Brandon		
Fraser Block	1890	Brandon		
Holy Trinity Anglican Church	1890	Killarney, Manitoba		
Knox United Church	1891	Belmont, Manitoba		
St. Lupicin Roman Catholic Church	1891	Rural Municipality of Lorne		
Lorne Terrace	1892	Brandon		
St. Mary St. Alban Anglican Church	1892	Pembina		
Utility Building	1892	Winnipeg		
Paterson-Matheson House	1893, with 1904 addition	Brandon		
Peck Building	1893	Winnipeg		
Stovel Block	1893	Winnipeg, Manitoba		
St. Pauls United Church	1893	Boissevain, Manitoba		
Margaret Laurence House	1894	Neepawa, Manitoba		
Penrose House	1894	Winnipeg		
Saint-Léon Roman Catholic Church	1894	Saint-Léon		
DALNAVERT NATIONAL HISTORIC SITE	1895	Winnipeg, Manitoba		
Ashdown Warehouse	1895–1911	Winnipeg		
Masonic Temple	1895	Winnipeg, Manitoba		
Saint Adolphe Roman Catholic Church	1896	Saint Adolphe, Manitoba		
Public Building	1895–1898	Portage la Prairie		
Wesley Hall	1895	Winnipeg		
H. P. Tergesen General Store	1898	Gimli		
Vendôme Hotel	1898	Winnipeg	Henry Sandham Griffith	
Old St. Michael's Ukrainian Orthodox Church	1898–1899	RM Stuartburn(Oldest surviving Ukrainian church in Canada)		
Isbister School	1899	Winnipeg		
Donald H Bain building	1899	Winnipeg		
McClary Building	1899–1912	Winnipeg		

== New Brunswick ==
Before 1784, New Brunswick was part of the colony of Nova Scotia and the majority of the population was aboriginal. The native populations of the land that is now New Brunswick were a nomadic people and thus there are few remains of their settlements. However, in 1784 New Brunswick became its own colony due to an increasingly non-aboriginal population. The area was mostly forest until United Empire Loyalists started to arrive, and European-style buildings were not constructed for the most part until after their arrival. Many Acadian homes and settlements were destroyed by the British during the expulsion of the Acadians known as the Great Expulsion from 1755 to 1763. Acadians were a people of French descent who lived in New Brunswick, Prince Edward Island and Nova Scotia for over a century before the British took over the lands that were New France. After the expulsion there was a short wave of settlement by a peoples known as the New England Planters. They were a small group without a lot of remaining architecture.

The following is a list of oldest buildings and structures in New Brunswick constructed prior to 1890.

Building	Floors	Built	City	Architect	Notes
Treitz Haus	2 1/2	1769	Moncton		The eastern section of the building was completed in 1769 with the second addition completed in the 1820s.
John Dunn House	3	1784	St. Andrews	John Dunn	Significant in that it was possibly the first house built in Saint Andrews taller than two floors. A United Empire Loyalist, Dunn brought most of the materials to build the house with him from New York in 1784.
Gladstone Smith House	2	1785	St. Andrews		
Odell House, Fredericton	3	1785	Fredericton		The oldest building in Fredericton, O'Dell House was built by Jonathan O'Dell. Much of the 18th century interior of the house remains intact, including the jail cells in the basement which were used as a prison for deserters.
Smyth House	1 1/2	1787	Fredericton		This house is an excellent example of loyalist construction in late 18th-century New Brunswick. It was built out of necessity and with the available material: wood.
Trinity Church and Rectory		1789	Kingston Creek, New Brunswick		
Reverend Samuel Andrews House	1 1/2	1790			
Boultenhouse	2	1790	Sackville, New Brunswick		
Sanderson House	2	1796	Fredericton, New Brunswick		
The Whale Store or the Bradford Hotel	2	1800	St. Andrews		
Allen House	2	1800	Fredericton		
Farraline House	2	1809	Fredericton		
Steeves House Museum	2	1812	Hillsborough		
St. Andrews Blockhouse		1813	St. Andrews		One of three that once guarded St. Andrews. However, it never saw battle.
St. Cecile Church		1813	Sainte-Cécile, New Brunswick		
Keillor House	2	1813	Dorchester, New Brunswick		It is an example of a Palladian-inspired dwelling with its use of two lateral wings beside a main central block. It is also one of the rare stone residential buildings in the Maritime region to use this type of design.
Carleton Martello Tower	2	1815	Saint John		
Loyalist House	2 1/2	1810–1817	Saint John	David Daniel Merrit	
Sheriff House	2 1/2	1820		St. Andrews	
Bell Inn	2 1/2	1820		Dorchester, New Brunswick	
Free Meeting House	1	1821	Moncton		Constructed as a meeting place for all denominations as a place of worship until churches could be built for their respective use.
Greenock Presbyterian Church		1821–1824	St. Andrews, New Brunswick		
Chestnut Hall	2	1824	St. Andrews, New Brunswick		
Williston House	2	1824	Miramichi	Andrew Currie	The oldest building in the Miramichi area.
St. John's Anglican (Stone) Church		1825	Saint John		
Government House, Fredericton		1826–1828	Fredericton	James Woolford	Built after the former Lieutenant-Governors mansion burned to the ground in 1825.
Sir Howard Douglas Hall, University of New Brunswick		1826-27	Fredericton	James Woolford	Also known as "the Old Arts Building", it is the oldest building still officially in use by a university in Canada. It was designed by the same architect as Government House. The third floor was added to accommodate more staff and students in 1876–77.
Fredericton Garrison Barracks		1827	Fredericton		
Saint John County Court House	3	1829	Saint John		John Cunningham Inside the courthouse is a free-standing spiral stairway, one of the largest in the country.
Bonar Law House	3	1820s	Five Rivers, New Brunswick		
Chandler House	2	1831	Dorchester, New Brunswick		Built in the Classical Revival Style
Miramichi Marine Hospital	1	1831	Miramichi, New Brunswick		
Old Carleton Court House	3	1833	Woodstock, New Brunswick		
St. Luke's Anglican Church		1833	Quispamsis, New Brunswick		
Sainte-Anne-du-Bocage Church		1836	Caraquet, New Brunswick		
Charles Connell House	2 1/2	1839	Woodstock		
Charlotte County Court House	1	1839–1840	St. Andrews, New Brunswick		
York County Jail	2	1842	Fredericton		
St. Anne's Chapel (Fredericton)		1847	Fredericton		
Christ Church Cathedral		1853	Fredericton	Frank Wills	
Fredericton City Hall	4	1875-76	Fredericton	McKean & Fairweather	
Bank of New Brunswick (building)	2	1879	Saint John	Henry F. Starbuck	This building is intended to represent not only itself but the dozens of other buildings destroyed overnight by The Great Fire of Saint John, New Brunswick in 1877. Built on Prince William Street, the Bank of New Brunswick building is encompassed by blocks of other buildings constructed by several other architects between 1877 and 1881 in the area known today as the Trinity Royal Heritage Conservation Area.
New Brunswick Legislature	4	1882	Fredericton	J.C. Dumaresq	Constructed with stone after the first, built of wood, was destroyed by fire in 1880. Also of note on the Parliament Square site is the Old Education Building constructed in 1816 of stone with two more floors added in 1869. The Departmental building was completed in 1888.
Marysville Cotton Mill	4	1883-85	Fredericton	Greene and Company Mill Architects and Engineers	The imposing, four-storey, red-brick cotton mill building features a flat-roofed central tower, and numerous multi-pane mullion windows. It was Canada's second largest cotton mill at the time. The mill opened in the spring of 1885, with full production being reached in November 1889. It now sits rehabilitated to serve as government offices.

== Newfoundland and Labrador ==
The following is a list of oldest buildings and structures in Newfoundland and Labrador constructed prior to 1860.

Building	Built	City	Architect
Anderson House	1805	St. John's	James Anderson
William Alexander House	1811–1814	Bonavista, Newfoundland	
Hopedale Mission Provision House	1817	Hopedale, Newfoundland and Labrador	
Commissariat House	1818–1820	St. John's	
Mallard Cottage	1820	St. John's, Newfoundland	
Samuel Abbot House	1823	Bonavista, Newfoundlans	
Brigus Stone Barn	1825	Brigus, Newfoundland	
St. Michael's Convent	1826	St. John's	
Harbour Grace Courthouse	1830	Harbour Grace, Newfoundland	
Hawthorn Cottage	1830	Brigus, Newfoundland	
Victoria Manor	1830	Harbour Grace, Newfoundland	
Government House	1831	St. John's	
Church of the Most Holy Trinity (Trinity)	1831	Trinity, Newfoundland	
Hebron Moravian Mission	1830s	Hebron	
Harris Cottage	1833	St. John's	
Retreat Cottage	1834	St. John's	
Alexander House	1835	Bonavista	
Cape Spear Lighthouse	1835	St. John's	
The Stone House	1835	St. John's	
St. Paul's Anglican Church	1835	Harbour Grace, Newfoundland	
St. Thomas' Anglican Church	1835–1836	St. John's	
Ridley Office	1838	Harbour Grace, Newfoundland	
Campbell House,	1840	Trinity, Newfoundland and Labrador	
Gover House	1840	Trinity, Newfoundland and Labrador	
Slade House	1840	Trinity, Newfoundland and Labrador	
Christ Church	1842	St. John's	
St. Joseph's Roman Catholic Church	1842	Bonavista, Newfoundland	
Cape Bonavista Lighthouse	1843	Bonavista, Newfoundland	
Cluett House	1844	Belleoram	
St. Peter's Anglican Church	1844	Twillingate, Newfoundland	
Murray Premises	1846	St. John's	
Cathedral of St. John the Baptist	1847	St. John's	George Gilbert Scott
Thompson Building	1847	St. John's	
Yellow Belly Corner	c. 1847	St. John's	
Newman Building	1848	St. John's	
Hopedale Mission House	1848–1853	Hopedale, Newfoundland and Labrador	
Bank of British North America Building	1849	St. John's	William Howe Greene
O'Dwyer Block	1849	St. John's	
Colonial Building	1850	St. John's	James Purcell
Church of St. James the Apostle	1852	Battle Harbour	William Grey
Basilica of St. John the Baptist	1841–1855	St. John's	Ole Joergen Schmidt
Bishop's Library, St. Bonaventure College	1854	St. John's	
Point Amour lighthouse	1854–1857	Point Amour	Charles François Xavier Baby
Presentation Convent Cathedral Square	1853	St. John's	Ole Joergen Schmidt, James Purcell
Old St. Bonaventure's College	1857–1858	St. John's	

== Northwest Territories ==
Building	Built	City	Architect	Notes	Image
Church of Our Lady of Good Hope	1885	Tulita			
The Wildcat Cafe	1937	Yellowknife			

== Nova Scotia ==
The following is a list of oldest buildings and structures in Nova Scotia constructed prior to 1830.

Building	Historic Structure Year	Current Structure Year	City	Architect	Notes	Image
Fort Anne	1629	1708	Annapolis Royal		Possibly the oldest extant building / site in Canada. The permanent garrison left in 1854 and it became Canada's first National Historic Site in 1917.	
de Gannes-Cosby House	1693	1708	Annapolis Royal		Possibly the oldest, privately owned, wooden house in Canada. Some additions to house up to the 20th century.	
Adams-Ritchie House	1686	1712	Annapolis Royal		Possibly the oldest, unaltered privately owned, wooden building in Canada. All additions and alterations were removed to reveal the original building. This was the site of the official residence of the Governors of Acadia / Nova Scotia since at least 1686.	
Williams House (Annapolis Royal)	1715	1715	Annapolis Royal		Possibly the oldest, unaltered and fully original, privately owned, wooden building in Canada. Was moved from its original location in the 19th century.	
Fort Edward Blockhouse	1750	1750	Windsor		Possibly the oldest unaltered and fully original wooden building in Canada on its original location.	
St. Paul's Church	1750	1750	Halifax		The core of the church dates from 1750, with significant additions made in 1812, 1868 and 1872.	
The Little Dutch Church	1756	1756	Halifax		The structure dates to the early 1750s. The building was moved to its present location, consecrated, and saw the addition of a steeple in 1756. It remains the second-oldest surviving building in Halifax after St. Paul's Church.	
Sinclair Inn	1710	1781	Annapolis Royal		The main structure known as the Sinclair Inn dates to 1781. The building incorporates within its structure two earlier French period buildings – the Soullard (1710) and Skene (1712) houses. The dates have been verified by dendrochronology.	
Sambro Island Light	1758	1758	Halifax		Oldest surviving lighthouse in North America. Expansion undertaken in 1906.	
St. John's Anglican Church	1763	1763	Lunenburg		Although severely damaged by fire in 2001, reconstruction took place re-using as many original materials as possible. Where this was not possible, it was reconstructed with new materials to the original design.	
Morris House	1764	1764	Halifax		Although largely intact, it was relocated in 2013.	
Goodwin House	1765	1765	Habitant			
North Hills Museum (Amberman House)	1702	1765	Granville Ferry		The existing building is believed to mainly date from 1765, but possibly includes elements from earlier buildings (ie 1702). The lot has been occupied since at least the 1730s.	
Old Barrington Meeting House	1765	1765	Barrington Head		Wood-frame building erected by settlers from New England; one of the oldest surviving buildings in English-speaking Canada, and a good example of a New England–style colonial meeting house	
Simeon Perkins House,	1767	1767	Liverpool, Nova Scotia			
Jeremiah Calkin House	1768	1768	Grand Pre		Although largely intact, it was relocated in 2008.	
Bailey House	1708	1770	Annapolis Royal		Often cited as 1770, architectural and documentary evidence point to a construction date nearer 1820. A building has been on or around this site since before 1688, but it has not been verified if it was this building or another.	
Ottawa House	1770	1770	Parrsboro, Nova Scotia		Includes a late 19th century addition.	
Scott Manor House	1770	1770	Halifax (Bedford)			
Bonnett House	1708	1773	Annapolis Royal		The current building dates from 1773 although a building stood on this site since at least 1708. A building has been on or around this site since before 1688, but it has not been verified if it was this building or another.	
Kent Lodge	1775	1775	Wolfville			
Solomon House	1775	1775	Lunenburg			
Planters Barracks	1778	1778	Starrs Point		Enlarged in 1796.	
Stewart House	1779	1779	Grand Pre		Heritage Property Program indicates year of construction as 1800.	
Thomas Courtney house	1784	1784	Shelburne, Nova Scotia		Has been enlarged at later date.	
Quaker Whaler House	1785	1785	Dartmouth			
Ross-Thomson House & Store	1785	1785	Shelburne, Nova Scotia			
Jost House	1786	1786	Sydney, Nova Scotia			
Randall House	1786	1786	Wolfville			
Cossit House	1787	1787	Sydney, Nova Scotia			
Bailly House	1790	1790	Lunenburg, Nova Scotia			
Christ Church Anglican Church(originally St. Paul),	1790	1790	Karsdale, Nova Scotia			
St. Mary's Anglican Church (Auburn, Nova Scotia)	1790	1790	Auburn			
Lennox Tavern	1791	1791	Lunenburg, Nova Scotia			
Old Holy Trinity Anglican Church	1791	1791	Middleton			
St. George's Anglican Church	1791	1791	Sydney			
Borden House	1791	1791	Grand Pre		Boyhood home of Sir Robert Borden, Prime Minister of Canada, 1911–1920	
Centenary United Church (Originally Methodist)	1792	1792	Upper Granville, Nova Scotia			
Knaut-Rhuland House	1793	1793	Lunenburg			
Prince's Lodge (Music Room)	1794	1794	Halifax			
Saint Edward's Anglican Church	1795	1795	Clementsport			
Mills Homestead	1795	1795	Granville Ferry		Robert Mills emigrated from Yorkshire, England and built the house in 1795 or 1796. Although extensively altered, the core of the house is still original. The building has a view of Fort Anne, Annapolis Royal across the Annapolis Basin.	
Prince of Wales Tower	1797	1797	Halifax		Oldest Martello Tower in North America	
Samuel Greenwood House	1797	1797	Dartmouth			
Fort Anne Officers' Quarters	1798	1798	Annapolis Royal			
St. George's (Round) Church	1800	1800	Halifax			
DeWolfe House	1801	1801	Wolfville, Nova Scotia			
Halifax Town Clock	1803	1803	Halifax			
St. John's Anglican Church	1804-1812	Port William, Nova Scotia				
Argyle Township Court House and Jail	1805	1805	Tusket		Canada's Oldest Standing Wooden Court House	
Government House	1805	1805	Halifax			
Acacia Grove/Prescott House	1809	1809	Port Williams			
Covenanter Church	1811	1811	Grand Pre			
Uniacke House	1815	1815	Mount Uniacke			
Christ Church (Anglican)	1817	1817	Dartmouth			
Black-Binney House National Historic Site of Canada	1819	1819	Halifax			
Admiralty House	1819	1819	Halifax			
Province House	1819	1819	Halifax			
William Black Memorial United Church	1821	1821	Halifax			
Saint Luke's Anglican Church (Annapolis Royal)	1789	1822	Annapolis Royal			
St. Andrews Presbyterian Church	1828	1828	Lunenburg, Nova Scotia			
St. Patrick's Roman Catholic Church (museum)	1828	1828	Sydney, Nova Scotia			
St. Mary's Basilica	1829	1829	Halifax			

== Nunavut ==
The following is a list of oldest buildings and structures in Nunavut constructed prior to 1960.

Building	Built	City	Architect	Notes	Image
Fort Conger	1881	Ellesmere Island			

== Ontario ==
The following is a list of oldest buildings and structures in Ontario constructed prior to 1830, excluding the cities of Markham, Toronto, and the Region of Waterloo.

Building	Built	City	Architect	Image
Peter Secord House	1782	Niagara-on-the-Lake (St. Davids)		
Peter Secord Grist Mill	1782–1783	Niagara-on-the-Lake (St. Davids)		
Mohawk Chapel	1785	Brantford		
Hawley House	1785	Bath		
Secord ~ Paxton House	1785–1790	Niagara-on-the-Lake (St. Davids)		
Joseph Clement House	1786	Niagara on the Lake (St. Davids)		
Daniel Reynolds House	1786 or 1792	Wellington		
Nelles-Fitch House	1791 (rear portion is from 1787)	Grimsby		
Lake Lodge	1792	Niagara-on-the-Lake		
Queen's Rangers' Cabin	1792	Hamilton (Flamborough)		
Sir John Johnson House	1792 (oldest part)	Williamstown, Ontario		
Old Hay Bay Church	1792	Adolphustown		
Fairfield House	1793	Amherstview		
De Puisaye House	1794	Niagara-on-the-Lake		
Scadding Cabin	1794	Toronto		
Fairfield-Gutzeit House	1796	Bath		
Brown Homestead	1796 / 1802	St. Catharines		
Gordon Hunter-Dick House	1796	Niagara-on-the-Lake, Virgil		
Park House Museum	1796	Amherstburg		
Whirlpool House	1796	Niagara Falls		
Powder Magazine (Fort George)	1796	Niagara-on-the-Lake		
Battlefield House	1796	Hamilton (Stoney Creek)		
Backhouse Mill	1798	Norfolk County		
Nelles Manor	1798	Grimsby		
Gordon House	1798	Amherstburg		
Duff Baby House	1798	Windsor		
Buchner House	1799	Niagara Falls		
Elias Smith House	1799	Port Hope		
Johns Common School	1799	St. Johns (Thorold), Ontario		
Homewood	1799–1800	Augusta		
Field House	1800 or 1799	Niagara-on-the-Lake		
Halfway House	1800	Niagara-on-the-Lake		
McFarland House	1800	Niagara-on-the-Lake		
Nelles Merchant Shop	1800	Grimsby		
Niagara School of Horticulture (core house)	1800	Niagara Falls, Ontario		
Old Stone Shop	1800	Grimsby		
Westfield Trading Post	1801	Hamilton (Flamborough)		
Fort George	1802	Niagara-on-the-Lake		
Old St. Andrews Roman Catholic Church (now used as parish hall)	1802	St. Andrews		
Cline House	1803	Grimsby		
Laura Secord House	1803	Niagara-on-the-Lake (Queenston)		
Richard Hatt Building	1804	Hamilton (Dundas)		
Bethune-Thompson House	1805 (incorporates cabin from 1784)	Williamstown		
Chittenden House	1805	Amherstburg, Ontario		
Clement House	1805	Niagara-on-the-Lake (St. Davids)		
Collard House	1805	Niagara Falls, Ontario		
Danner House	1805	Niagara Falls		
Freel House	1805	Niagara-on-the-Lake		
McGregor-Cowan House	1805	Windsor		
Mitchell Cottage	1805	Niagara Falls, Ontario		
Glenora (Peter Van Alstine) Mill	1806	Glenora, Ontario		
Tisdale House	1806	Hamilton (Ancaster)		
Fort Erie (completed)	1808	Fort Erie		
Hamilton-Kormos House	1808	Niagara-on-the-Lake (Queenston)		
Rochleau House	1808	Kingston		
West wing of Young-McLean House	1808	Ameliasburgh Prince Edward County		
Ball's Grist Mill	1809	Jordan		
Dalziel Barn	1809	Vaughan		
Powell-Wisch House	1809/1818	Niagara on the Lake,		
St. Mark's Anglican Church	1809 (founded 1791)	Niagara-on-the-Lake		
White Chapel	1809	Picton		
Upper House	1809	Thorold (Allanburg)		
Bamberger House	1810	Hamilton (Flamborough)	Samuel Bamberger	
Church House	1810	Niagara Falls		
Corman House	1810	Hamilton (Stoney Creek)		
Maison de l'île	1810	Hawkesbury, Ontario		
Morden House	1810	Hamilton (Dundas)		
Prescott Barracks	1810	Prescott, Ontario		
Springdale	1810	Hamilton (Flamborough)	Hector McKay	
Delta Mill	1810	Delta		
Westbrook House	1810	Hamilton (Flamborough)	Haggai Westbrook	
Cherry Hill House	1811 (Stone wing) / 1822	Mississauga		
Conrad Huffman House	1811	Amherstview, Ontario		
John Bogart House	1811	Newmarket		
St. Paul's Anglican Church (Originally Baptist)	1811	Delta		
Stonewatch	ca 1811	Amherstview, Ontario		
Young-McLean House	1811	Ameliasburgh Prince Edward County		
232 King Street, East	1812	Kingston		
Barker House	1812	Picton, Ontario		
Dressmaker's Cottage	1812	Grimsby, Ontario		
McCrae House	1812–1813	Raleigh (Chatham-Kent)		
St. Andrew's United Church (originally Presbyterian)	1812 (founded 1787)	Williamstown		
François Baby House	1812	Windsor		
Hahn Lawson House	1812	Fort Erie		
Lynde House	1812	Whitby		
Pierre Belleperche House	1812	Windsor		
Walker House	1812	Toronto (North York)		
Ermatinger Old Stone House	1812–1814	Sault Ste. Marie		
"The Barracks"	1812–1814	Cobourg		
Asa Werden House	1813	Prince Edward County, Ontario		
Commandant residence Royal Military College of Canada	1813	Kingston, Ontario		
John Scott House	1813	Prince Edward County, Ontario		
John Snider House	1813	Colchester		
Fort Mississauga	1814	Niagara-on-the-Lake		
Log Chapel	1814	Hamilton (Flamborough)		
Butler House	1815	Niagara-on-the-Lake		
Jacob Fry House	1815	Jordan		
Kerr-Wooll House (Demeath)	1815, on foundations from 1790	Niagara-on-the-Lake		
Old Post Inn	1815	Ajax		
Thames River Lighthouse	1815	Lakeshore, Essex County, Ontario		
The Olde Angel Inn	1815 (Circa 1789)	Niagara-on-the-Lake		
William Woodruff House	1815	Niagara-on-the-Lake (St. Davids)		
Woodruff-Rigby House	1815	Niagara-on-the-Lake (St. Davids)		
Amos Biggar House	1816	Trafalgar Township		
Inverarden	1816	Cornwall		
Belleview	1816	Amherstburg		
Niagara Masonic Hall	1816	Niagara-on-the-Lake		
Vanderlip House	1816	Niagara-on-the-Lake		
Ham House	1816	Bath		
Harmony Hall	1816–1819	Hamilton (Ancaster)		
Wilson-Kent House	1816	Niagara-on-the-Lake		
Glasgow/Smyth Building	1817	Prescott, Ontario		
Heintzman House	1817 (central part)	Thornhill, Ontario		
Lockhart-Moogk House (Storington)	1817	Niagara on the Lake		
Macdonell-Williamson House	1817	East Hawkesbury		
Old Bank House	1817	Niagara-on-the-Lake		
Rogers House	1817 (on foundation from 1792)	Niagara-on-the-Lake		
Butlers Barracks	1817	Niagara-on-the-Lake		
Annette Twining House	1818	Niagara-on-the-Lake		
Nash-Jackson House	1818	Hamilton (Stoney Creek)		
William Kirby House	1818	Niagara-on-the-Lake		
Christ Church	1819	Amherstburg, Ontario		
Clergue Blockhouse (stone part)	1819	Sault Ste Marie		
Barnum House	1819	Grafton		
Ebenezer Doan House	1819	East Gwillimbury		
Avondbloem	1820	Williamsburg, Ontario		
Brick Barracks, Fort Malden	1820	Amherstburg		
Commercial Building	1820	Grafton, Ontario		
D'Aubigny Inn	1820	Hamilton (Flamborough)		
Joseph A. Keeler House	1820	Colborne		
McDougal-Harrison House	1820	Niagara on the Lake, Ontario		
Niagara Apothecary	1820	Niagara-on-the-Lake		
Prince George Hotel	1820	Kingston, Ontario		
Stone frigate	1820	Kingston, Ontario		
Alexander-Robinson House	1820	Niagara Falls, Ontario		
Duldraeggan Hall	1821	L'Orignal, Ontario		
Former Poulin-Clément Store	1821	L'Orignal, Ontario		
Furry Tavern	1821	Lowbanks		
Montreal House	1821	Mississauga (Streetsville)		
Grover House	1822	Grafton, Ontario		
Mackenzie Printery	1822	Niagara-on-the-Lake (Queenston)		
St. Mark's Anglican Church	1822	Port Hope		
St. Thomas Church	1822	St. Thomas		
Anderson House	1823	Niagara-on-the-Lake		
American House	1824	Waterdown, Ontario		
John Moore House	1824	Sparta, Ontario		
Inge-Va	1824	Perth		
Locust Hall	1824	Niagara-on-the-Lake (St. Davids)		
St. James Anglican Church	1824–1826	Maitland, Ontario		
John Thomson Jr House	1825	Niagara Falls, Ontario		
L'Orignal Court House and Jail	1825	L'Orignal		
Customs House	1825	Niagara-on-the-Lake		
Robert Shuter House	1825	Thornhill, Ontario		
St. Andrew's Anglican Church	1825 (founded in 1794)	Grimsby, Ontario		
St. John the Evangelist Anglican Church	1825	Niagara Falls, Ontario		
St. Mary Magdalene Anglican Church	1825	Picton, Ontario		
Timothy Street House	1825	Mississauga (Streetsville)		
Walbridge House	1825	Newcastle		
St. George Anglican Cathedral	1825–1828 (founded in 1792)	Kingston		
Allan Macpherson House	1826	Napanee		
Griffin House	1827	Hamilton (Ancaster)	John Lawrason	
Poplars (Spencer House)	1827	Cobourg		
St Peter's Anglican Church	1827	Tyrconnell		
Sparta's Adobe Blacksmith Shop	1827	Sparta, Ontario		
South Landing Inn	1827	Niagara-on-the-Lake Queenston		
Stone House currently the Bytown Museum	1827	Ottawa	Thomas McKay	
Middlesex County Court House	1827–1829	London		
157-161 Queen Street	1827	Kingston		
Blacksmith's house	1828	Hamilton (Flamborough)		
Billings Estate	1828	Ottawa, Ontario		
Jacob Ball House	1828	St. Catharines, Ontario		
Moore-Bishop-Stokes House	1828	Niagara on the Lake		
Robinson-Adamson House	1828	Mississauga		
St. James Anglican Church	1828 (founded 1822)	Beckwith (Franktown)		
Samuel Crane House (St. Mark's Convent)	1828	Prescott, Ontario		
Chesley's Inn	1829	Cornwall, Ontario		
False Ducks Lighthouse	1829	Prince Edward County		
McArthur Estate	1829	Niagara-on-the-Lake		
Stiver House	1829	Unionville, Ontario		

== Prince Edward Island ==
The following is a list of oldest buildings and structures in Prince Edward Island constructed prior to 1860.

Building	Built	City	Architect	Notes	Image
The Doucet House	1768	Rustico		Moved to its current location in 1999.	
12-14 Dorchester Street	1779–1805	Charlottetown, Prince Edward Island			
Wellington House	1811	Charlottetown, Prince Edward Island			
55-57 Dorchester Street	1812	Charlottetown, Prince Edward Island			
St. John's Presbyterian Church	1824	Belfast, Prince Edward Island			
Carmichael-MacKieson House	1824	Charlottetown, Prince Edward Island			
187-189 Dorchester Street	1833	Charlottetown, Prince Edward Island			
Government House	1834	Charlottetown, Prince Edward Island			
215-217 Richmond Street	1836	Charlottetown, Prince Edward Island			
Lyle House	1836	Birch Hill, Prince Edward Island			
St. Augustine's Catholic Church	1838	Queens County, Prince Edward Island			
Fairholm National Historic Site	1839	Charlottetown, Prince Edward Island			
Old St. James Anglican Church	1841	Port Hill, Prince Edward Island			
Holy Trinity Anglican Church	1842	Georgetown, Prince Edward Island			
Perkins House	1843	Charlottetown, Prince Edward Island			
70 Sydney Street / 63 Pownal Street	1844	Charlottetown, Prince Edward Island			
Point Prim Lighttower	1845	Belfast, Prince Edward Island			
Pavilion Hotel	1846	Charlottetown, Prince Edward Island			
Province House	1847	Charlottetown, Prince Edward Island			
Clifton United Church	1849	Stratford, Queens County, Prince Edward Island			
Panmure Head Lighthouse	1853	Kings County, Prince Edward Island			
Gordon Memorial United Church	1857	Alberton, Prince Edward Island			

== Quebec ==
The first Europeans to arrive in Quebec were settlers from France. They founded Quebec City in 1608 and erected there the first foundations such as the Habitation made of wood and set up by Samuel de Champlain. Despite the founding of other significant settlements in New France in the 17th century, notably Trois-Rivières in 1634 and Montreal in 1642, there are only a few 17th-century buildings that still survive outside the Capitale-Nationale region. Therefore, the oldest buildings still standing in Quebec are found heavily in and around Quebec City. All such buildings date from the French regime and are protected as historical monuments under the law enforced by the Ministry of Culture and Communication of Quebec.

The following is a list of old buildings and structures in Quebec constructed prior to 1750.

Building	Historic Structure Year	Current Structure Year	City	Architect	Notes	Image
Maison Puiseaux	1638	Early 1700s	Quebec City			
Maison de madame de La Peltrie	1644	1836	Quebec City			
Basilique-cathédrale de Notre-Dame-de-Québec	1647	1923	Quebec City	Gaspard-Joseph Chaussegros de Léry, Jean Baillairgé	Previous buildings destroyed by fire in 1759 and 1922.	
Maison Delisle	1648	1764	Deschambault-Grondines		Original house destroyed by fire in 1759.	
Maison du Duc-de-Kent	1648	Early 1700s	Quebec City		The basement and ground floor walls are original, the rest of the building was built in the 1700s.	
7363 avenue Royale	1668	1668	Château-Richer		Possibly the oldest private house in Canada. Some additions after original construction.	
Manoir Boucher de Niverville	1668	1668	Trois-Rivières		Later 1700s addition.	
Maison LeBer-LeMoyne	1669	1669	Montreal (Lachine)	Jacques Le Ber	Possibly the oldest, fully intact and unaltered, building in Canada. Later additions removed to reveal original building.	
Maison Marcoux	Between 1670 and 1700	Between 1670 and 1700	Quebec City		Enlarged around 1810	
Chapelle Notre-Dame-des-Anges	1671	1671	Notre-Dame-des-Anges			
Maison-Laberge	1674	1674	L'Ange-Gardien		Enlarged in 1692 and 1791.	
Moulin à vent de Grondines	1674		Deschambault-Grondines			
Maison François-Jacquet-dit-Langevin	1675		Quebec City			
Séminaire de Québec	1675		Quebec City	François de Laval		
Manoir de Charleville	1677		Boischatel			
Maison Gourdeau	1677		St. Jean, ile d'Orleans			
Maison Morisset	1678		Sainte Famille, Ile d'Orleans			
Maison Amiot	1679		Quebec City			
Sacristie de l'Hôpital-Général-de-Québec	1679		Notre-Dame-des-Anges	Jean-Baptiste de Saint-Vallier		
Bâtiment des Récollets de l'Hôpital-Général-de-Québec	1680		Notre-Dame-des-Anges	Jean-Baptiste de Saint-Vallier		
1789, chemin Royal	1680		Ile d'Orleans			
Gagnon House	1680		Sainte-Famille, ile d'Orleans			
Maison Rageot	1682		Quebec City			
Maison Chavigny-Gosselin	1683		Quebec City			
Maison Louis-Fornel	1683		Quebec City			
Maison Louis-Jolliet	1683		Quebec City			
Maison Frérot	1683		Quebec City			
Maison Maheu-Couillard	1683		Quebec City			
Maison Hazeur	1684		Quebec City			
Maison des Jésuites	1684		Quebec City			
Maison Delage	1684		Quebec City			
Tours du fort des Messieurs de Saint-Sulpice	1684		Montreal			
Vieux-Séminaire de Saint-Sulpice	1684		Montreal	Society of Saint-Sulpice		
Windmill of Isle St-Bernard	1686		Châteauguay			
Notre-Dame-des-Victoires, Quebec City	1687		Quebec City			
Maison Jean-Demers	1689		Quebec City			
Maison Lambert-Dumont	1689		Quebec			
Maison Michel-Dubuc	1690		Longueuil			
Vincelotte Windmill	1691		Cap-Saint-Ignace			
2360–2362, chemin Royal	1691		ile d'Orleans			
La Petite Ferme, House	1692		La Petite-Ferme, Quebec			
Fort de la Montagne	1694		[Montreal, Quebec]			
Moulin (Mill) du Petit-Pré	1695		Château-Richer			
Maison Saint-Gabriel	1698		Montreal			
Presbytère de Notre-Dame-de-la-Visitation	1698		Quebec City			
Couvent des Ursulines	1699		Trois-Rivières			
Maison Descaris	1700		Montreal			
Maison Range-dit-Laviolette	1700		Baie-D'Urfé			
Maison des Jésuites-de-Sillery	1702–1733		Sillery, Quebec City			
Château Ramezay	1705		Montreal			
Domaine de Maizerets	1705		Quebec City			
Maison Péan	1705		Quebec City			
Pointe-du-Moulin	1708		Notre-Dame-de-l'Ile-Perrot			
Pointe-Claire Windmill	1709		Montreal			
Maison Étienne-Nivard-de Saint-Dizier	1710		Montreal			
Dauphine Redoubt	1712		Quebec City			
Maison de la Veuve-Groleau	1715		Deschambault-Grondines			
Church of St-Pierre	1717–1719		Île d'Orléans			
Pointe-aux-Trembles Windmill	1719		Montreal			
Maison Molleur-Dit-Lallemand	1720		Beaumont, Quebec			
Maison Vézina	1720		Boischatel			
Sanctuaire de Notre-Dame-du-Cap	1720		Trois-Rivières			
Watermill of Saint-Laurent	1720		Ile d'Orleans			
Maison Etienne-Marchand	1722		Quebec			
Maison Therrien	1722		Laval, Quebec			
Maison Patenaude-Bienheureuse	1723		Longueuil			
Church of the Purification of the Blessed Virgin Mary	1725		Repentigny			
Maison Guillaume-Leduc	1725		Quebec			
Église Saint-Étienne-de-Beaumont	1726–1733		Beaumont, Quebec			
Maison Larchevêque-Lelièvre	1727		Quebec			
Maison Drouin	1729		St. Famille, [Ile d'Orleans]			
Maison Michel-Cureux	1729		Quebec City			
Maison Christin dit Saint-Amour	1732		Rivière-des-Prairies–Pointe-aux-Trembles			
Saint-François Church	1734		St-Jean, Ile d'Orleans			
Manoir Mauvide-Genest	1734		Ile d'Orleans			
Saint-Jean Church	1737		St-Jean, Ile d'Orleans			
Hurtubise House	1739		Montreal (Westmount)			
Maison Lamontagne	1744		Rimouski			
Sainte-Famille Church	1747		Ste-Famille, Ile d'Orleans			
Chapelle de Tadoussac	1747–1750		Tadoussac, Quebec			

== Saskatchewan ==
The following is a list of oldest buildings and structures in Saskatchewan constructed prior to 1900.

Building	Built	City	Architect	Image
Holy Trinity Anglican Church	1854	Stanley Mission	The Rev. Robert Hunt	
Mission of St. Antoine de Padoue	1884	Batoche	Oblates of Mary Immaculate; Ludger Gareau	
Marr Residence	1885	Saskatoon		
All Saints Anglican Church	1887	Katepwa Beach		
Almighty Voice Jailhouse	1880	Duck Lake		
Powder Magazine	1890	Cumberland House		
Territorial Administration Building	1891	Regina	Thomas Fuller	
Jean Caron Sr. Farm Home	1895	Batoche	Jean Caron Sr.	
All Saints Anglican Church	1896	Duck Lake		
Hudson's Bay Company Store	1897	Fort Qu'Appelle		
Motherwell Homestead	1897	Abernethy	William Richard Motherwell	

== Yukon ==
The following is a list of oldest buildings and structures in Yukon constructed prior to 1900.

Building	Built	City	Architect	Image
Fort Selkirk Schoolhouse	1892	Fort Selkirk		
Coward Cabin	1898	Fort Selkirk		
Lowe's Mortuary	1898	Dawson City		
North West Mounted Police Jail	1898	Dawson City		
St. Francis Xavier Roman Catholic Church	1898	Fort Selkirk		
Yukon Hotel	1898	Dawson City	J.E. Binet	
Yukon Sawmill Company Office	1898	Dawson City		
Robert Service Cabin	1898–1899	Dawson City		
P. Denhardt Cabin	1899 (before)	Dawson City	Paul Dennhardt	
Third Avenue Hotel, Building 14	1899	Dawson City		
Dawson City Telegraph Office	1899	Dawson City		
Mme. Tremblay's Store (16)	1899	Dawson City		
NWMP Married Quarters	1899	Dawson City		
Pioneer Hotel 2	1899	Whitehorse	John Smart, Edward Dixon	

== See also ==
- Architecture of Canada
- List of heritage buildings in Vancouver
- List of oldest buildings and structures in Halifax, Nova Scotia
- List of oldest buildings and structures in Toronto
- Gothic Revival architecture in Canada
