= Brown Homestead =

Heritage site in St. Catharines

Coordinates: 43°06′32″N 79°17′11″W

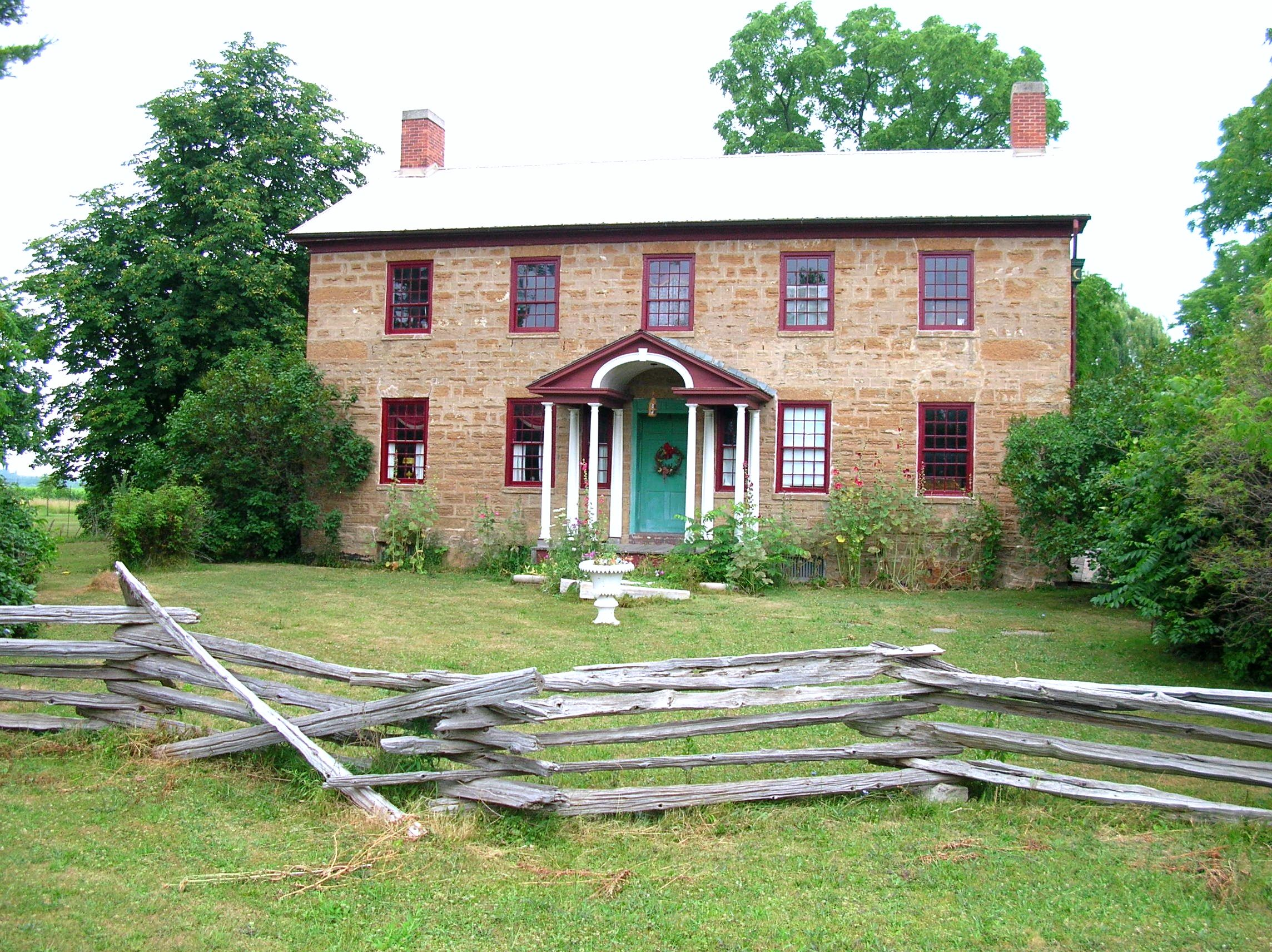
A photograph of the Brown-Jouppien House

The Brown Homestead is a designated heritage property located on 1317 Pelham Road, St. Catharines, Ontario. The dwelling is an example of Loyalist Georgian architecture. It is the oldest residence remaining in the city, as it was first constructed in 1796. The Brown Homestead was expanded through an addition completed in 1802. At the time of construction, the Mohawk Trail (as we know now as Pelham Road) was a stagecoach route for early settlers. The Brown Homestead also sits on the outskirts of Short Hills Provincial Park.

== History ==
In 1784, land was purchased in the Niagara Peninsula from the Mississaugas by the British government with the intent of Loyalist resettlement after the American Revolution. Land patents were then issued to individuals who built permanent dwellings on the land that was issued to them; this was the case with John Brown and his family. Brown had served the British crown and was a private in Captain Lewis Genevay's Company of the Butler's Rangers. Brown's property in upstate New York was confiscated by the state and he was eventually granted 900 acres of land in the townships of Thorold, Pelham and Louth.

After John Brown's death in 1804, the house was inherited by eldest son, Adam Brown, and his 1206 acre property was divided among his children. Following Adam's death, in 1855, the house was inherited by his son, Jacob Brown, who sold it to Joseph Chellew in 1858. In 1892, Chellew sold it to his son, Joseph Chellew Jr, who, in 1902, sold it to Lafontaine Powers. In turn, the property was bought by Jon Jouppien in 1979 from Lafontaine's son, Charlie Powers. Jouppien, a noted heritage consultant, made preliminary renovations to the house itself. In 2015, it was purchased by the John Brown Heritage Foundation, a charity incorporated by Brown family descendants to preserve the historic site. In 2021, the foundation changed its official name to The Brown Homestead.

== Recent use ==
The house sites on a 7.5 acre property and is currently undergoing an adaptive restoration in order to be used as a community or educational-related venue. The property began hosting a community garden named after victory gardens in 2022. The resulting produce was donated to local food banks.

== See also ==
- DeCew House
- Short Hills Provincial Park
- St. Catharines Armoury
- List of oldest buildings in Canada
