= North Hills Museum =

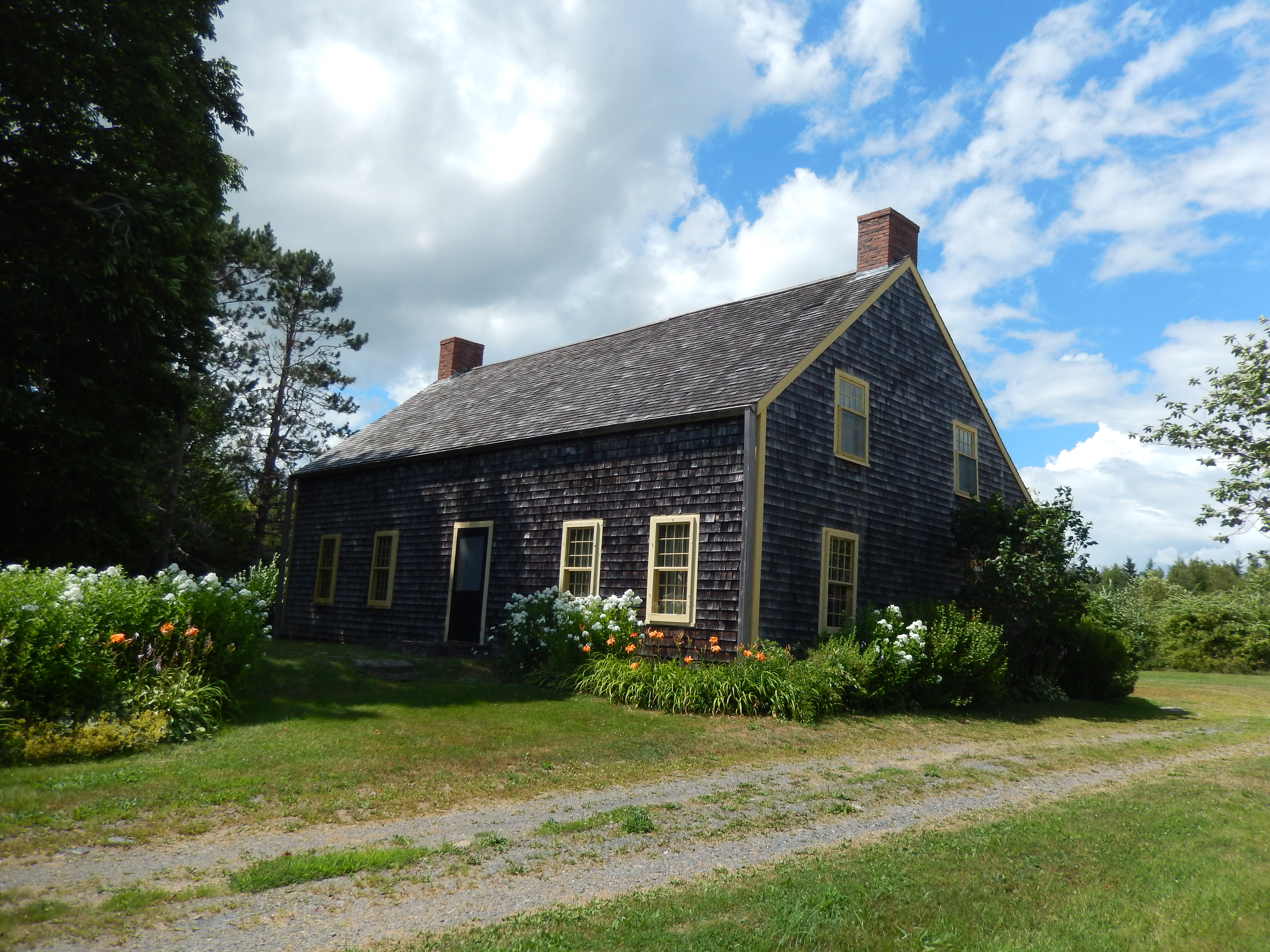

- Location within Nova Scotia
- Alternative names: Amberman House

General information
- Location: 5065 Granville Rd, Granville Ferry, Canada
- Coordinates: 44.74330°N 65.53729°W
- Year built: 1764

Design and construction
- Designations

Nova Scotia Heritage Property Act

Website
- https://northhills.novascotia.ca

North Hills Museum is a house-museum located in Granville Ferry, Nova Scotia, Canada. It is a neoclassical house built around 1764 and is one of the oldest wood framed buildings in Canada. It was bought in 1784 by the Ambermans, a Loyalist family from New York State, who owned the house for six generations. In 1964, it was purchased by Robert Patterson, an antique collector who restored the house to an 18th century appearance. Upon his death in 1974, he willed the house to the Province of Nova Scotia.

The house is owned by the Nova Scotia Museum and administered by the Annapolis Heritage Society.

== History ==
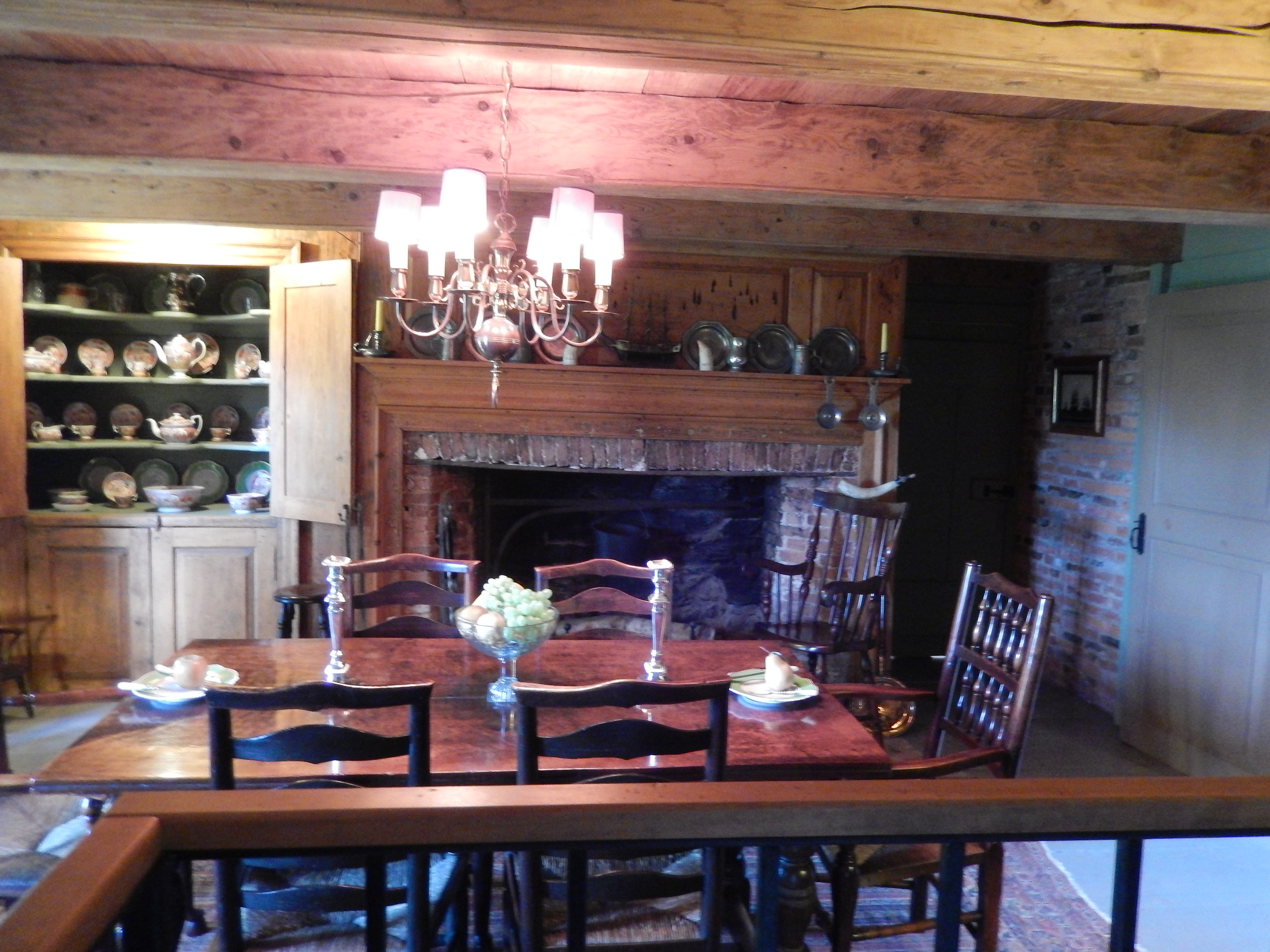
North Hills dining room

The early history of the house is uncertain, but it is believed to be built around 1764, using elements from an older building. The date "1702" is carved on one of the beams and one of the walls is made of cob, a technique generally associated with earlier Acadian houses in the region.

In 1784, the house was bought by Paul Amberman, a New York loyalist who was part of the exodus at the end of the American Revolution. The Amberman family owned the house for six generations before selling it in 1964 to Robert Patterson, an antique collector.

Following the purchase, Patterson restored the house to give it an 18th century appearance. He also renovated it to highlight his collection of Sheraton, Hepplewhite and Chippendale style furniture, English and Chinese ceramics, Sheffield dishes and English glass. Upon his death, he donated his house and collection to the Province of Nova Scotia as a museum.

== Architecture ==
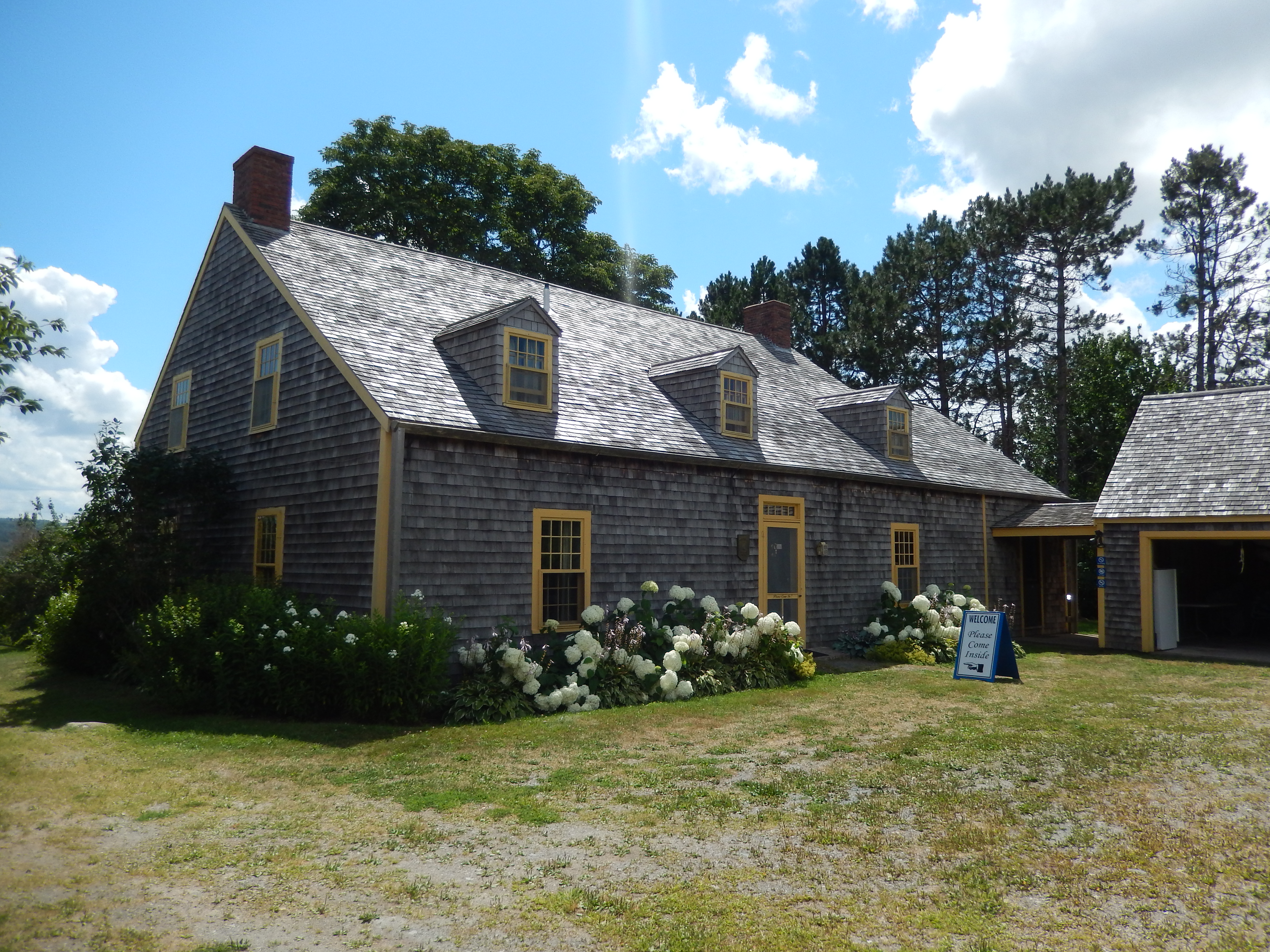
Back of North Hills

North Hills is a one-and-a-half-storey neoclassical house, which is characterised by the symmetry of its openings and a central door, as well as the two chimneys at the ends. The entire building has no eaves. The exterior walls of the house and the roof are covered with wood shingles. The interior is undecorated with exposed beams. In the dining room, the original pine woodwork and fireplace is preserved.

The house has undergone several changes over the years. An annex, including a summer kitchen, was added to the west and a one and a half floor expansion was added to the east. Paterson added a Georgian-style fireplace and a wooden corner inspired by that of the Bailey House in Annapolis Royal.

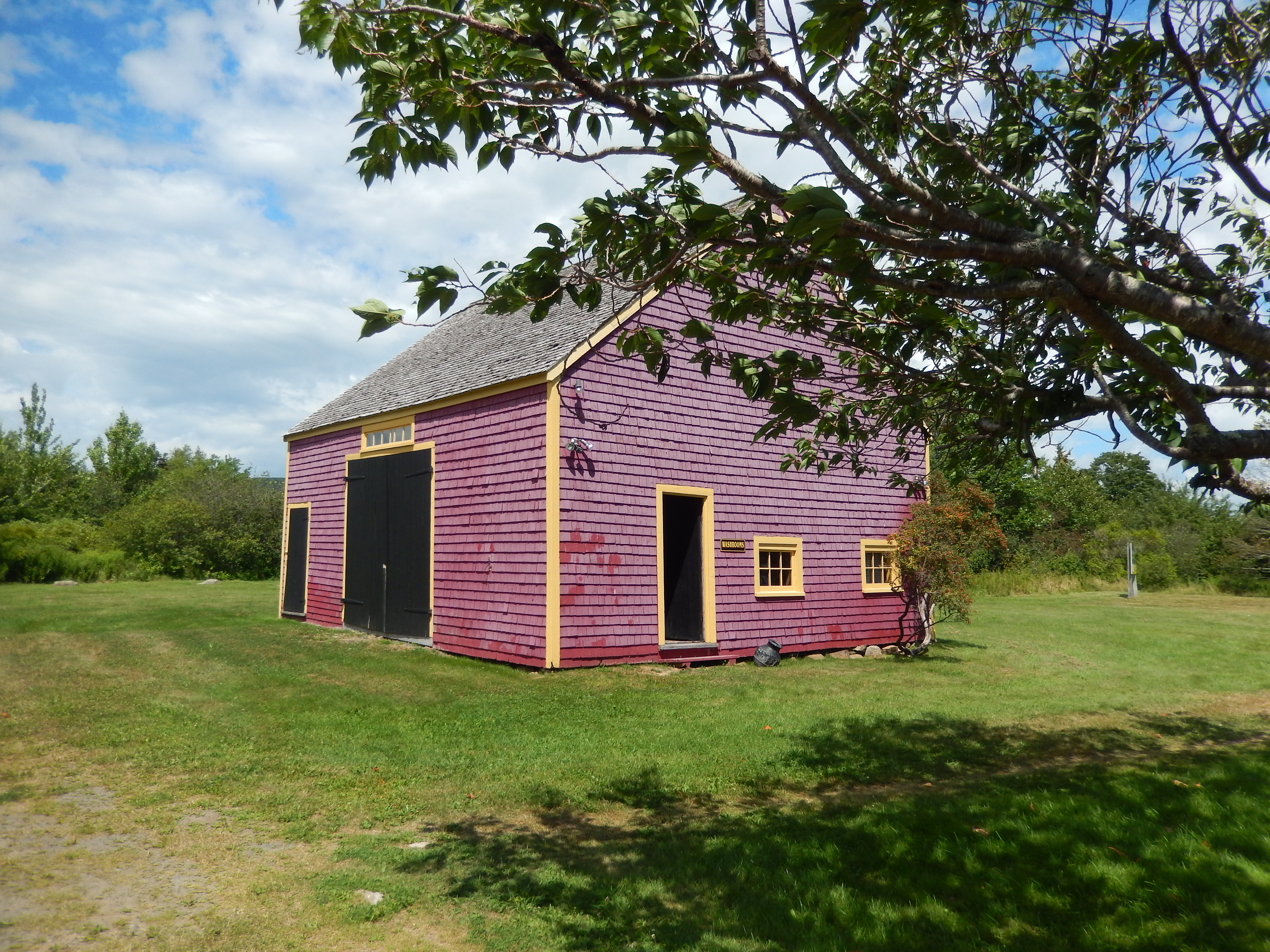
Barn at the back of the house

The site also includes a small barn and dry toilets. The outbuildings are covered in the same manner as the wooden shingle house. A garage, which is a later addition, is attached to the house by a covered passage.

== Tourism ==
North Hills Museum is jointly managed by the Nova Scotia Museum and the Annapolis Heritage Society. The house presents the collection of furniture, ceramics, glasses, silverware and paintings collected by Robert Patterson during his lifetime. The furniture in particular has the three wood species characteristic of English furniture, namely oak, walnut and mahogany.

The museum is open seasonally. Admission is by donation

== See also ==
- List of oldest buildings in Canada
- Annapolis Royal (Town)
