= Grape and Wine Festival =

Annual festival in St. Catharines, Ontario, Canada

The Grape and Wine Festival at Montebello Park

The Grape and Wine Festival is an annual event that takes place in St. Catharines, Ontario, Canada, each September, with various activities. The festival starts and concludes with parades.

== Festival ==
The festival started in 1952. It started as a small event and became larger over time. Traditionally the festival held different events each weekend at Montebello Park, such as the "Mayor's Grape Stomp" during the first week of September. Other activities take place as well, such as live music and wine tasting. There is an area for children called Grapeland.

In 2024, all events were condensed into a single weekend. That year's festival was held in Downtown St. Catharines instead of Montebello Park, with operating costs being considered too expensive when 70% of visitor traffic occurs during the concluding parade. A brunch event also took place in Niagara-on-the-Lake. A "grape king", intended as a representative for the local wine industry, is chosen each year. A prince and princess are also chosen and must be younger than seven years old. The Grape and Wine Festival is the largest event for wine in Canada.

The Grape and Wine Festival also holds a separate icewine event in January.

== Parades ==
=== Pied Piper ===
The festival begins with the Pied Piper Parade. It is less formal than the concluding Grande Parade and the participants involved are mostly children. The 2022 version of the event also included puppies. The event has varying costume themes. The 2023 version of the event raised money for the Ronald McDonald House.

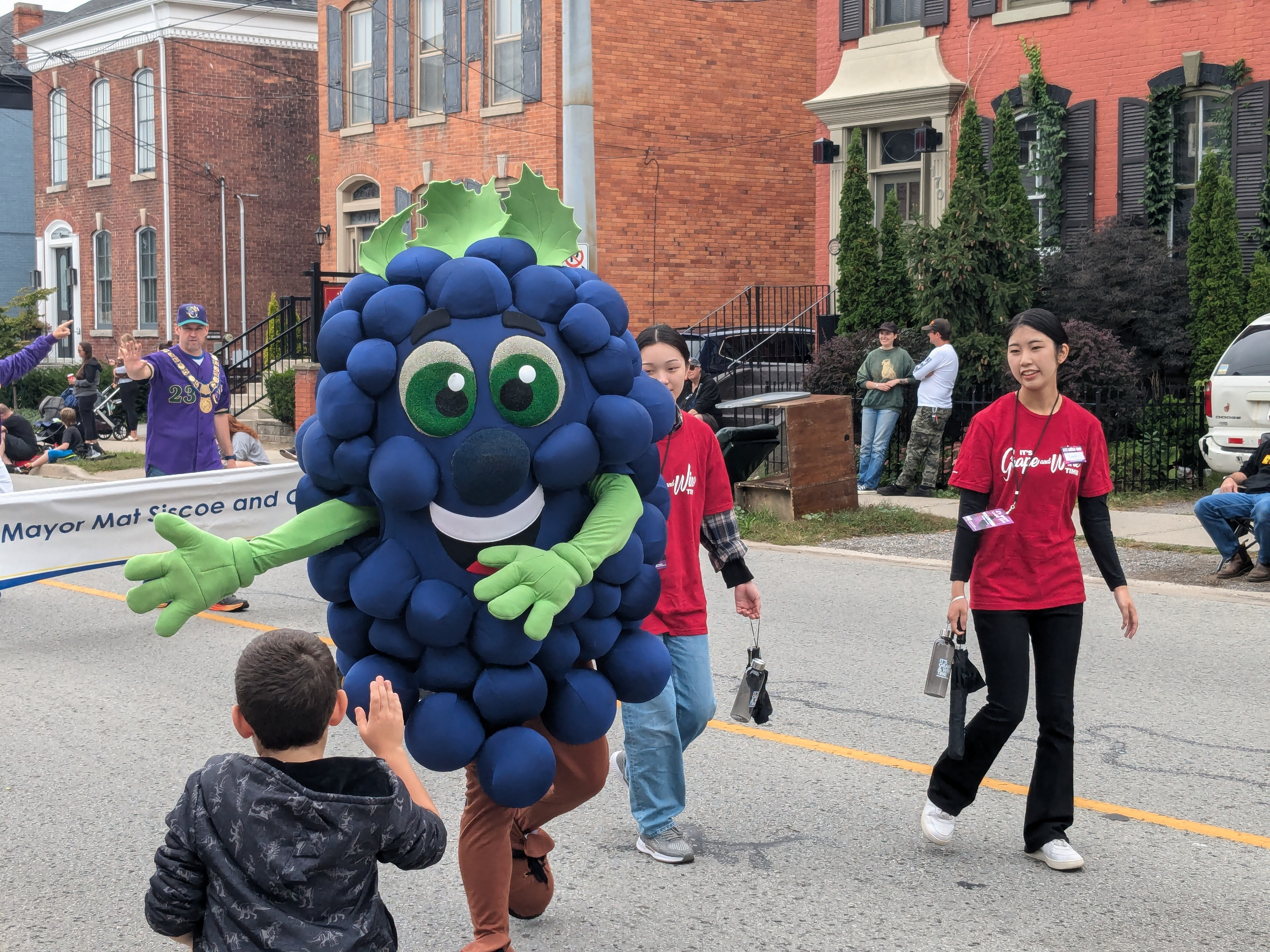
2024 edition of the Grande parade

=== Grande Parade ===
The parade was part of the festival since its beginning in 1952. About 50 to 65 groups perform in the Grande parade and this procession takes approximately an hour to get through its route. This event concludes the Grape and Wine Festival. Volunteers collect food donations at the parade. Historically, the parade had a Welland Labour Council union float. A Caribbean-themed float was introduced in 1992. The Lincoln and Welland Regiment Association Band performs in the parade each year. In 2023, the Canadian military formed a new policy prohibiting volunteer bands, so the band was renamed.

== See also ==
- List of festivals in Ontario
