= Downtown St. Catharines =

Coordinates: 43°09′30″N 79°14′50″W

- Neighbourhood
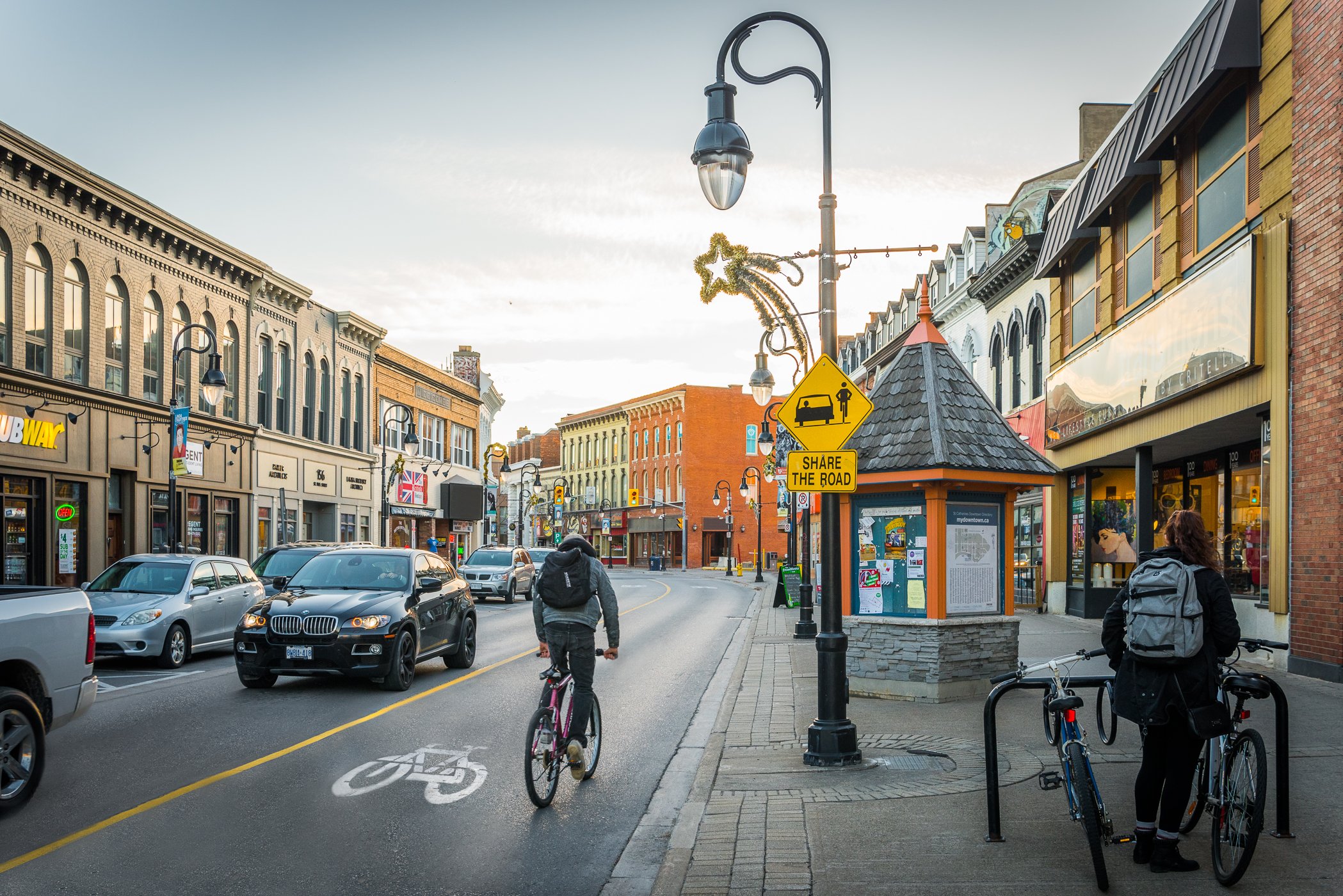
- Downtown core
- Interactive map of Downtown St. Catharines
- Country: Canada
- Province: Ontario
- City: St. Catharines

Downtown St. Catharines is the central business district of St. Catharines, Ontario, Canada. It is defined by the city as the area between Highway 406 on the west and south, Geneva Street on the east until it reaches St. Paul Street then Welland Avenue north until it meets Niagara Street.

It is an historical area of the city as well as a significant cultural and entertainment destination. The Niagara Grape and Wine Festival parade is held in downtown St. Catharines. Various retail and commercial businesses are found throughout the downtown core, as well as government, financial and law offices. Since 2015, the neighbourhood has been home to the Marilyn I. Walker School of Fine and Performing Arts, a campus of Brock University.

== History ==
Intersecting trails used by Indigenous peoples, at the confluence of Dick's Creek and 12 Mile Creek, laid the foundation of the downtown streets as they appear today.

Before it was called St. Catharines, the settlement near Twelve Mile Creek was known by various names, including Shipman's Corners and The Twelve. The name St. Catharines was first recorded in 1796, as St. Catherines, and became a common name for the settlement by 1809, but it would often be spelled with -er- or with an apostrophe before the -s. The name and the spelling were standardized as St. Catharines when the town incorporated in 1845. Before St. Catharines became incorporated, it was simply a community within Grantham Township, although its authority over the area was limited. Construction of the first and second Welland Canals was a major influence in the area becoming a prosperous hub for commerce and industry in the Niagara Region.

Downtown St. Catharines has many heritage sites, such as:

- St. Catharines Armoury – A recognized Federal Heritage building, listed #1991 on the Register of the Government of Canada Heritage Buildings.
- British Methodist Episcopal Church, Salem Chapel - A national historic site, played an important role during the abolitionist era and frequented by Harriet Tubman, the famed conductor of the Underground Railroad.
- City Hall – Built on the site of the previous City Hall, this building was officially opened in August 1937 at the corner of Church and James Streets. Designed by local architect Robert Macbeth, the structure was originally built to accommodate all city departments, including a police station and jail in the basement. In 1963, the building was extensively renovated; however, most of the significant elements found inside, such as the main entryway, its marble floors, ornate ceiling and wide sweeping staircase, were left intact.
- Farmers' Market – One of the oldest farmers' markets in Ontario, dating back to the early 1860s. It continues to operate every Tuesday, Thursday and Saturday, as it has for more than a century.
- The Grand Opera House (1877–1998) – With seating for 1,200, the facility opened to much fanfare as a centre for musical production on Ontario Street. Over the years it housed an orchestra and featured numerous concerts and vaudeville shows. After a fire ravaged the building's facade and most of its interior, there was some public interest in restoring what was left of the auditorium, but the city and some professionals concluded that renovations would be much too costly and the site was levelled. The site is used today as a parking lot.
- The Canada Hair Cloth Company Ltd (1882–2007) – An industrial factory for over a century, the building closed in 2007 and is now home to Brock University's Marilyn I. Walker School of Fine and Performing Arts.
- The Russell Hotel – a noted hotel and tavern built in 1843 by Samuel Stinson at the corner of St. Paul and James streets. The building was destroyed by fire and the site currently sits empty.
- Mansion House – Thought to have been constructed in the early 19th century by William Hamilton Merritt, it is the oldest tavern in St. Catharines and the oldest continually licensed bar in Canada.
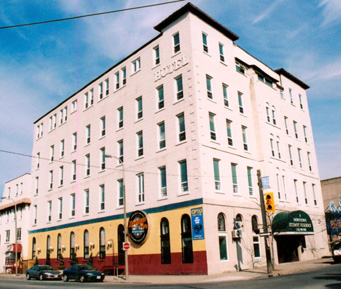
  The former Welland House
- Montebello Park – Designed by Frederick Law Olmsted in 1887, who went on to create New York City's Central Park. A commemorative rose garden with over 1,300 bushes in 25 varieties is the city's largest rose collection and features an ornamental fountain. The focal point of the park is a band shell and pavilion built in 1888. The park is designated under the Ontario Heritage Act.
- Old Courthouse – Built in 1848–49, the Old Courthouse was the centre of political, cultural and social life in St. Catharines. Designed by renowned architect Kivas Tully, it was hailed as a great architectural achievement. The existing building soon became too small and an addition was added in 1863–65. Today, the building is home to Carousel Players, an independent theatre group, and recently underwent an extensive restoration.
- Welland House Hotel – One of the last symbols of the city's extensive health spa history. Most recently, the building was home to a student residence and CFBU, Brock University's campus radio station before it was destroyed by fire in July, 2021.

The St. Catharines Economic and Tourism Services department, with support from the Ontario Ministry of Tourism, launched the Heritage Corridor Project in 2004. The goal of the project is to draw tourists off the Niagara Wine Route into St. Catharines' downtown and other historically significant areas.

== Revitalization ==
Numerous efforts have been made to improve the downtown; the restructuring of manufacturing resulted in a loss of jobs and retail businesses. In the early 21st century, city, university, and private developers undertook several initiatives related to urban design to revive downtown, clustering activities to attract people to the area as a destination from day through evening events. In 2006, city council approved converting one-way arteries through the city centre to allow for two-way traffic, to make it easier for people to make their way around the city to explore it. In terms of urban planning and use, two-way traffic improves circulation within the area. The city wanted to improve downtown as a destination, rather than a place to pass through. The council also want to have downtown St. Catharines on the Wine Route, a driving tour of Niagara wineries and an Ontario Wine Council initiative to boost the number of visitors to the region's many wineries. The Wine Route was modified to officially redirect winery goers through the downtown starting in 2012. On June 16, 2006, the Province of Ontario released a Growth Plan under the Places to Grow Act, 2005, out of which was born the Growth Plan for the Greater Golden Horseshoe in 2017. In the plan, Downtown St. Catharines is identified as one of 22 Urban Growth Centres for the province, given a growth target of 150 residents and jobs combined per hectare by 2031.

The first phase of two-way traffic was completed in 2009, with St. Paul and King streets being converted. The cost of the conversion was $3.5 million and was shared with Niagara Region. In 2012, most observers concluded that the change had achieved its goals; it garnered national media attention. Since the act, municipal and regional governments have invested heavily in infrastructure projects in the downtown core. A detailed inspection and analysis of the Burgoyne Bridge in 2010 revealed the need for a new span over Twelve Mile Creek. Construction on the new signature bridge, which features a steel truss-arch, began in 2014 with an estimated budget of $91.35 million, and was completed in 2016. The grand opening of the city's new spectator arena, the Meridian Centre, took place on October 21, 2014. The 5,300-seat arena was built by the municipality to house the Niagara IceDogs ice hockey team of the Ontario Hockey League.

In 2009, $54 million in joint federal, provincial and municipal funding was announced for the construction of a performing arts centre in the city's core, officially opened in September 2015 as the FirstOntario Performing Arts Centre. Complementing the centre, which features concert, dance and film venues, is Brock University's Marilyn I. Walker School of Fine and Performing Arts. The university renovated the former Canada Hair Cloth Building to use for the school. This former industrial building is behind St. Paul Street and next to the municipal performing arts centre. In late 2011, city council approved moving forward with the construction of a new spectator facility to replace the crumbling Garden City Arena Complex, built in 1938. Council voted to build a U-shaped facility, which will be home to the Niagara IceDogs, an Ontario Hockey League team, and be able to host other events, such as concerts. It would have room for 4,500 to 5,300 spectators. The goal is to keep the cost of the facility at or below $50 million and to build it on a swath of land known locally as the lower-level parking lot, behind St. Paul Street and abutting Highway 406. Council's commitment to build the facility resulted in IceDogs' owner Bill Burke promising to sign a 20-year lease with the city after he threatened to move his team if the city chose not to build a new arena.

The city has made other infrastructure improvements to the downtown. In January 2012, a new edition of the Carlisle Street Parking Garage opened. It was built to Leadership in Energy and Environmental Design standards and was certified for its environmentally friendly features, including a green roof, preferred carpool and hybrid vehicle parking, greywater collection, permeable interlocking brick pavement, and several bike racks for users. A mixed-use development, the structure was planned for retail space at street level on Carlisle Street, in order to promote activity and business on the street. The project cost $27.9 million, with funding split three ways between the federal, provincial and municipal governments. Starting in 2019, certain streets located in downtown St. Catharines have been closed during weekends to vehicle traffic. These pedestrian zones have expanded over time. $214,500 was allocated in the cities budget in 2021 for these road closures. In 2023, this initiative was discontinued.

== Gallery ==
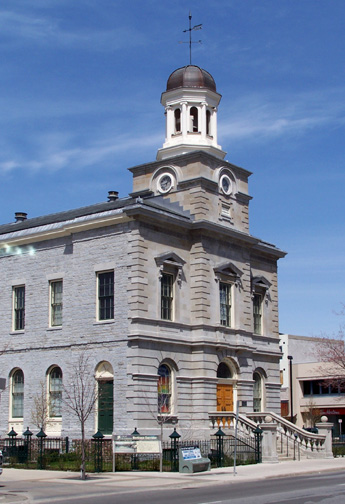
The Old Courthouse, at the corner of James and King streets

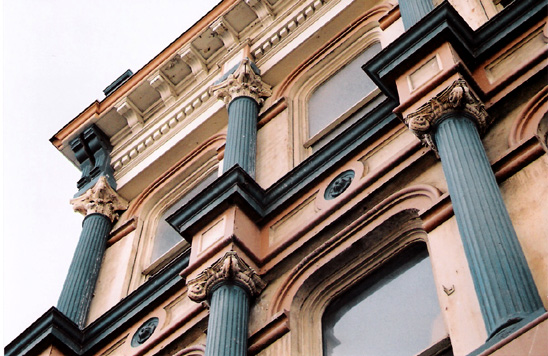
Architecture on Ontario St.

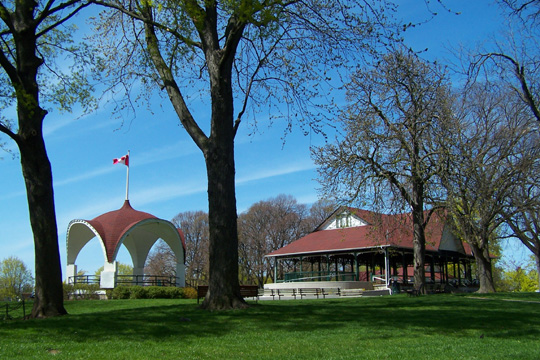
Montebello Park

== See also ==
- Burgoyne Bridge
