= The Village at Black Creek =

Open-air museum in Toronto, Ontario, Canada

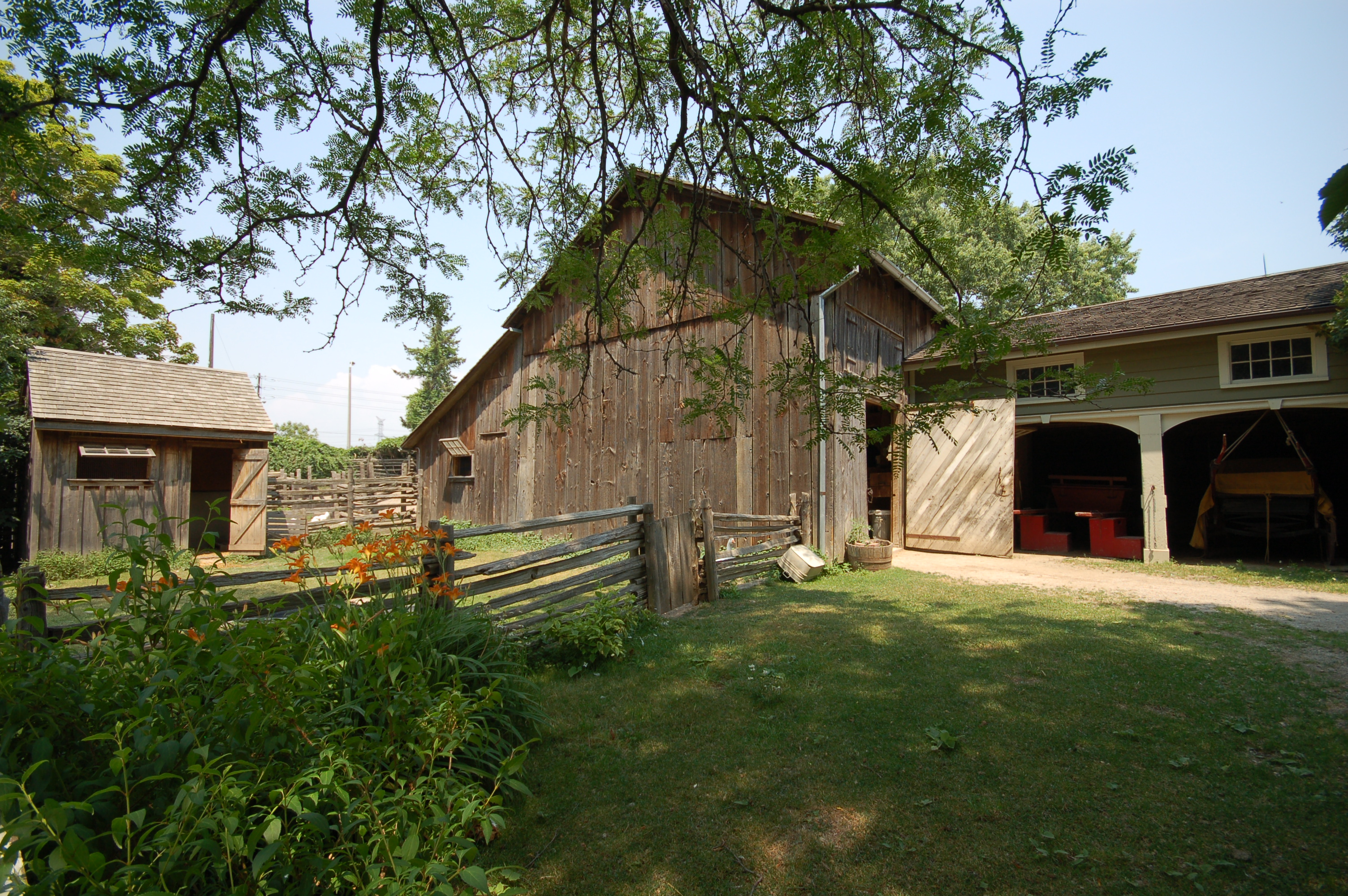

- Location of the museum in Toronto
- Established: 1960
- Location: Toronto, Ontario, Canada
- Coordinates: 43°46′26″N 79°31′02″W
- Type: Historic site
- Owner: Toronto and Region Conservation Authority
- Public transit access: Pioneer Village
- Website: www.blackcreek.ca

The Village at Black Creek, previously Black Creek Pioneer Village, and before that Dalziel Pioneer Park, is an open-air heritage museum in Toronto, Ontario, Canada. The village is located in the North York district of Toronto, just west of York University and southeast of the Jane and Steeles intersection. It overlooks Black Creek, a tributary of the Humber River. The village is a recreation of life in 19th-century Ontario and gives an idea how rural Ontario might have looked in the early-to-mid-19th century. The village is a regular destination for field trips by schoolchildren from the Greater Toronto Area. It was opened in 1960 and is operated by the Toronto and Region Conservation Authority.

Napier Simpson, a restoration architect in Ontario devoted his professional life to raising public awareness of the importance of heritage conservation including the Black Creek Pioneer Village project.

== Collection ==
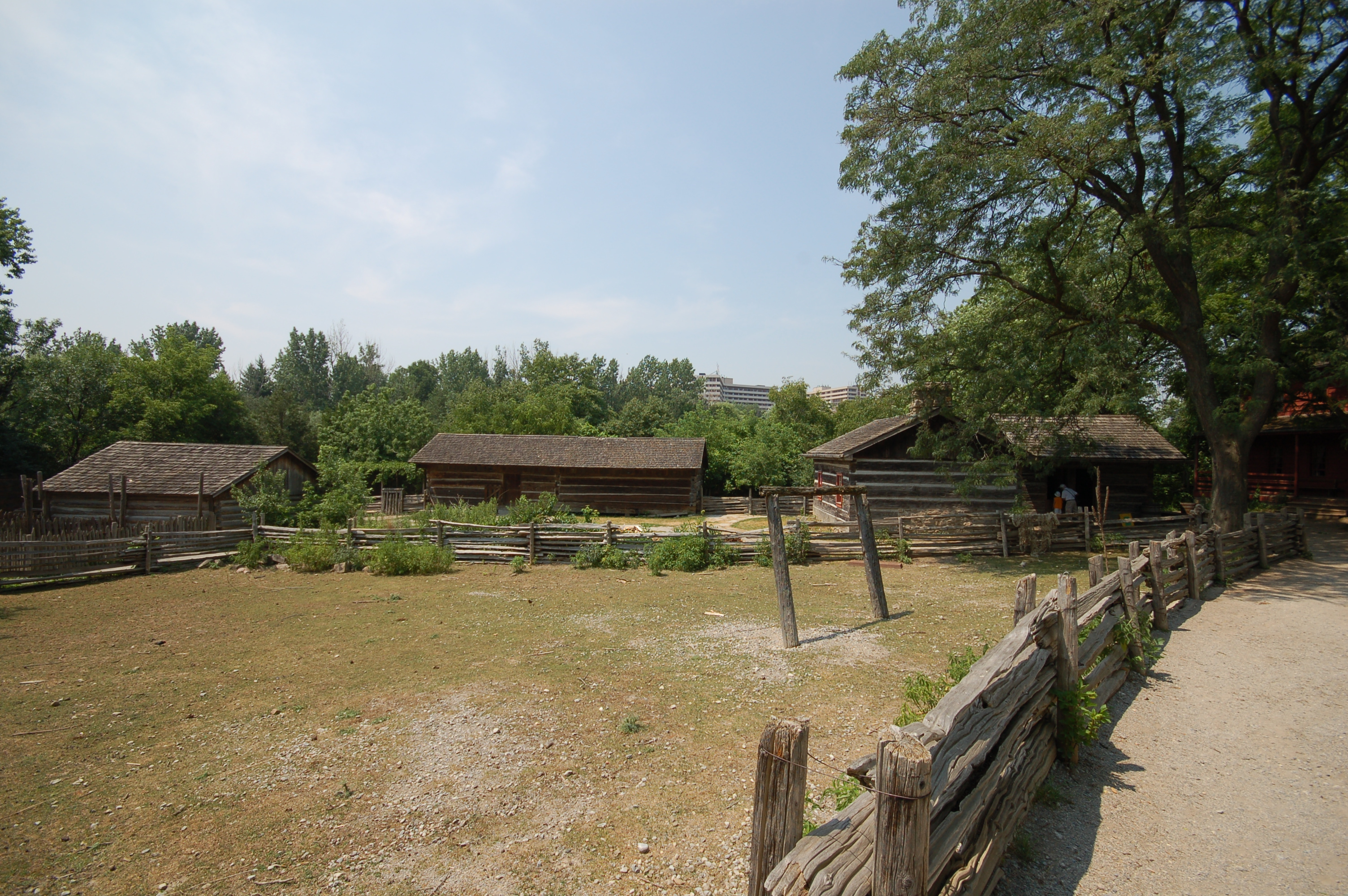
The village consists of over forty 19th century buildings.

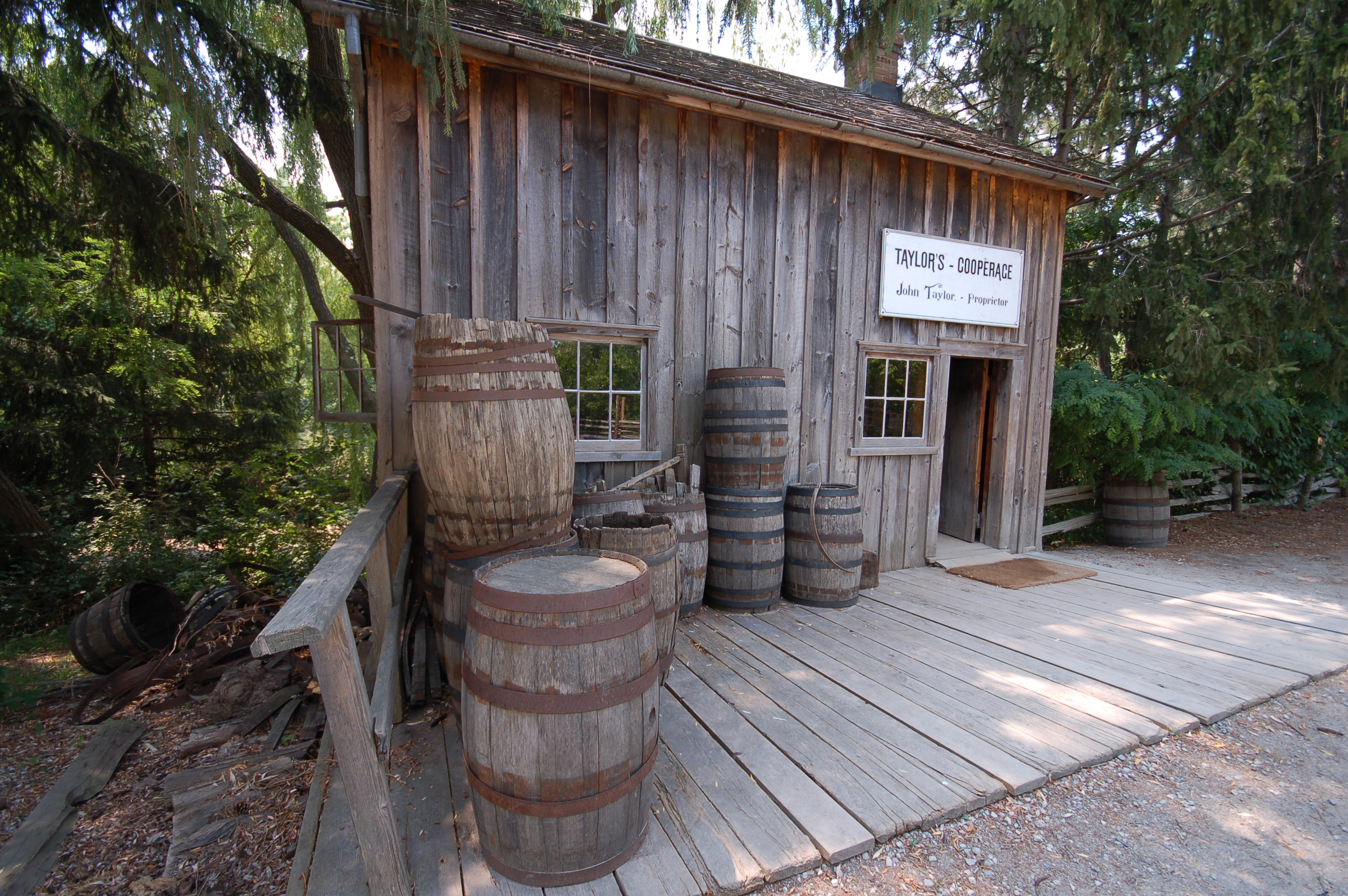
Taylor's Cooperage; this one-and-a-half-storey timber frame structure with board and batten.

The pioneer village consists of over forty 19th century buildings, decorated in the style of the 1860s with period furnishings. It is operated by historical interpreters and craftspeople housed in the restored buildings. The site also features historical re-enactments and visiting artisans, along with an annual Mennonite fair. Buildings include the Dalziel Barn, period houses, the original Stong family farm buildings, a water-powered grist mill, a general store, a blacksmith's shop along with over ten other trades buildings, a hotel, a church, and a one-room schoolhouse. A core of buildings built by the Stong family are on their original sites, while others have been moved in from across Southern Ontario.

The majority of the buildings were moved from their original sites (notably the large Halfway House and Mennonite Meeting House), and some re-built on their current locations. The board and batten blacksmith shop was originally built in the 1850s in Nobleton. The gunsmith shop was built in Bolton, and the Taylor Cooperage building was built in the 1850s in Paris. The weaver shop is within what was originally a Temperance Hall built in Kettleby in 1850 by the Sons of Temperance. The Roblin Mill has been relocated from Ameliasburgh.

== Affiliations ==
The museum is affiliated with the Canadian Museums Association, the Canadian Heritage Information Network, and the Virtual Museum of Canada.

== Future ==
Ontario premier Doug Ford said on August 23, 2019, that the Ontario government has no plans to close the village, despite the government's instructions to conservation authorities in Ontario to wind down activities unrelated to protecting watersheds and drinking water or preventing floods.

In September 2023, Black Creek Pioneer Village announced that it would be renamed the Village at Black Creek by the first quarter of 2024. The decision was made by the Toronto and Region Conservation Authority (TRCA) Board of Directors. The facility will also be expanding its museum and visitor centre.

== See also ==
- List of museums in Toronto
- List of oldest buildings and structures in Toronto
- Upper Canada Village
