= Burgoyne Bridge =

Bridge in St. Catharines, Ontario, Canada

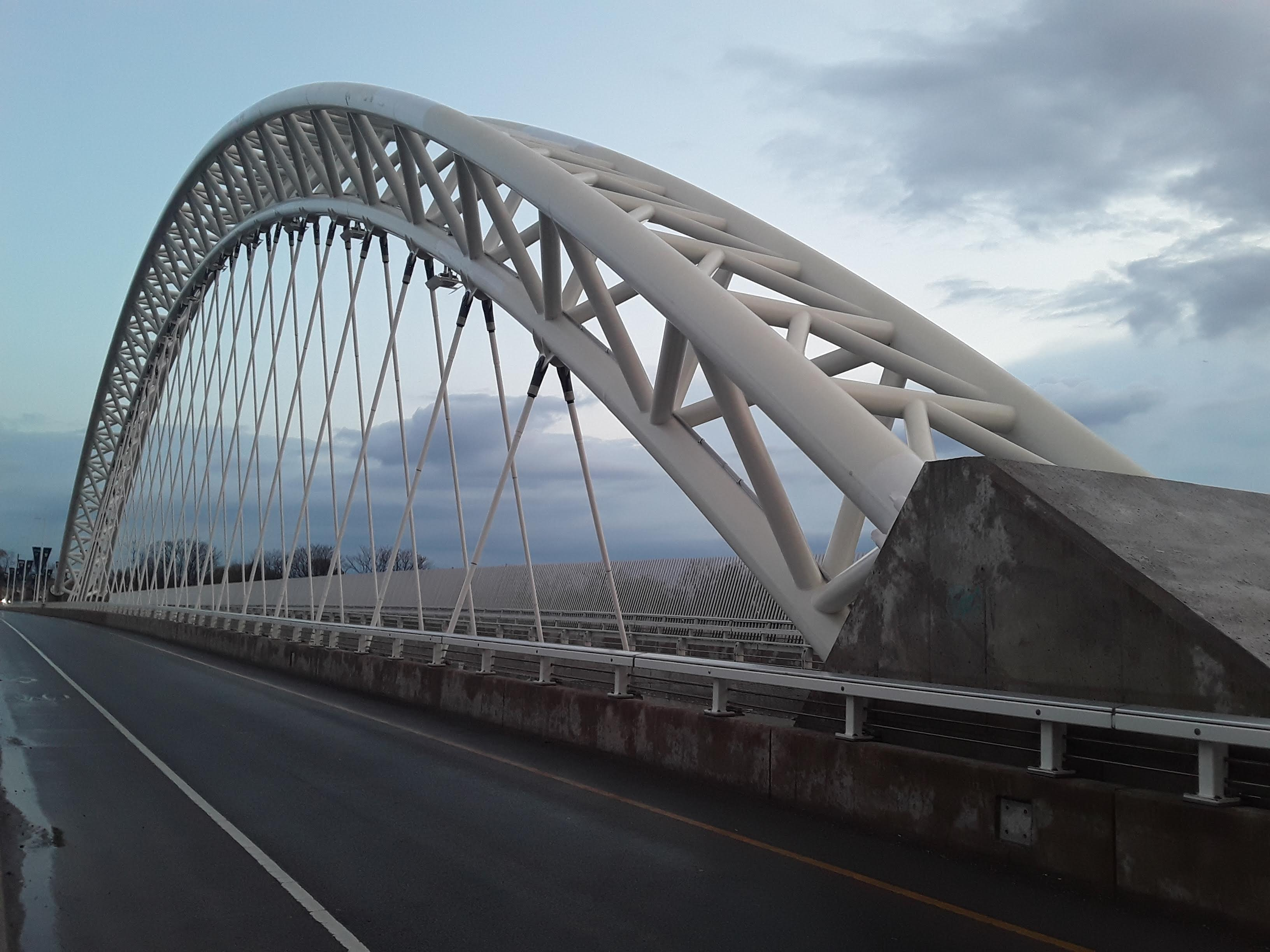
- Coordinates: 43.152468°N 79.246964°W
- Crosses: Twelve Mile Creek (Ontario)

Characteristics
- Total length: 333m

History
- Opened: 2016

The Burgoyne Bridge is a high level bridge in St. Catharines, Ontario, Canada. The original bridge was built in 1915 to provide a more direct route to travellers alongside a pre-existing lower level bridge.

In 2010, construction of a new Burgoyne Bridge was recommended by the Niagara Region. However, the project was not completed until 2016 due to the estimated cost. The new bridge is 333 meters long and features a 125-metre main span supported by a steel arch.

== Original bridge ==
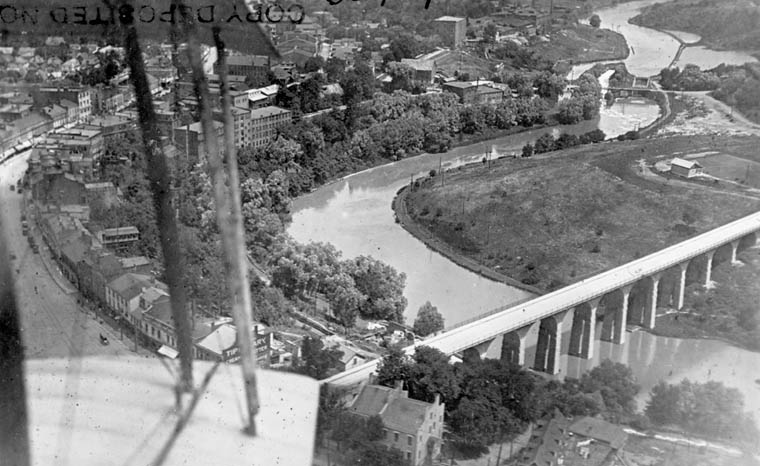
Aerial view of downtown St. Catharines in 1919 which depicts the original Burgoyne Bridge

A lower level swing bridge already existed near downtown St. Catharines, but a more direct route to St. Paul Street was desired, as travelling around Twelve Mile Creek created significant delays for travellers. This higher level bridge was designed by Sprague and Reppert and constructed by the Canadian Bridge Company. It opened in 1915 as the High Level Bridge but was renamed the Burgoyne Bridge a year later to reflect William B. Burgoyne's influence in its creation. He had advocated for a higher level bridge in the area, but would have preferred it to extend King Street across the canal.

Multiple buildings were demolished in order to accommodate the Burgoyne Bridge. Most of these were commercial buildings, with the exception of a residence of William Hamilton Merritt's. The construction of the bridge increased the real estate value of the surrounding area. It costed $115,000, which was $18,000 under the projected expenses. The bridge was completed in an 11-month timeframe. Burgoyne Bridge was able to avoid the descent into a valley left by the old Welland Canal.

Both bridges coexisted until 1942, when the swing bridge was removed so that the river channel could be widened to increase the hydroelectricity capacity at Decew Falls. A new wooden bridge was built to replace it and was used to accommodate traffic until Highway 406 was built.

== Current bridge ==
=== Suicide location ===
Guard rails installed on the bridge as a physical barrier to prevent suicide attempts

The new Burgoyne Bridge had a 4-metre (13 ft) gap between the two bridges on the road, which was considered to be dangerous to people who were suicidal. In April 2019, the bridge averaged someone committing suicide once a month, which resulted in Burgoyne Bridge having the second-highest suicide rate in North America. After a 19 year old died, more than 40 notes containing hopeful phrases were written by volunteers and placed on the bridge. Different measures were discussed to assist people in distress and to make the bridge safer. Some interim options studied by the public health department were the possibility of the installation of a distress phone or a mental health sanctuary as a small facility on site. In 2019, a project to install stainless steel netting as a suicide prevention measure was approved by the St. Catharines City Council. Installation of the stainless steel netting underneath the bridge and guardrails on the side of it was completed by July 2020. The project was originally intended to be completed in the spring of that year, but was delayed due to the COVID-19 pandemic in Ontario. There was also a delay in the arrival of the necessary materials. The project was allocated 4 million dollars.

=== Legal disputes ===
In 2016, an anonymous tip made allegations of fiduciary impropriety. A value-of-money audit was requested by the Niagara Region council after the estimated cost of the reconstruction went from $54 million to $91 million. A $500,000 audit was conducted by Deloitte Canada, the results of which were not released to the public. In March 2017, an investigation was launched by the Ontario Provincial Police into the budget of the bridge replacement project. The investigation took 21 months and concluded that there was no evidence of criminal wrongdoing.

In 2019, Pomerleau Inc. filed a lawsuit against the Niagara Region for $10 million, alleging that additional expenses were not paid for by the municipality when constructing the bridge and that there were 15 changes for which they were not compensated. Pomerleau Inc. also alleged that these changes lead to delays in their construction of the bridge.

== See also ==
- List of bridges in Canada
- Suicide bridge
