= The Olde Angel Inn =

Coordinates: 43.25496°N 79.07278°W

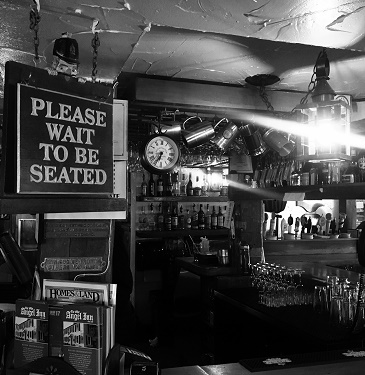
- Interactive map of The Olde Angel Inn

Restaurant information
- Food type: British cuisine
- Location: 224 Regent Street, Niagara-On-The-Lake, Ontario, Canada
- Website: oldeangelinn.com

The Olde Angel Inn is a historic pub on Regent Street in the heart of Niagara-on-the-Lake, Ontario. The Inn is said to be haunted by Captain Colin Swayze, the resident ghost.

== History ==
The Olde Angel Inn is one of the oldest pubs in Ontario (built in 1789 as The Harmonious Coach House). It has been reported as one of the oldest buildings in Canada. Although the Inn was rebuilt after the War of 1812, the exposed hand-hewn beams and thick plank floors laid in 1815 can still be seen. Historical figures such as John Graves Simcoe, the first Lieutenant-Governor; Alexander Mackenzie, the explorer; Prince Edward, the father of the future Queen Victoria; and Thomas Moore, the Irish National Poet were guests at The Olde Angel Inn.

== Location ==
The Olde Angel Inn is located on Regent Street in Niagara-on-the-Lake, Ontario. It is located five blocks away from the historic site of Fort George and less than 25 kilometres from Niagara Falls.

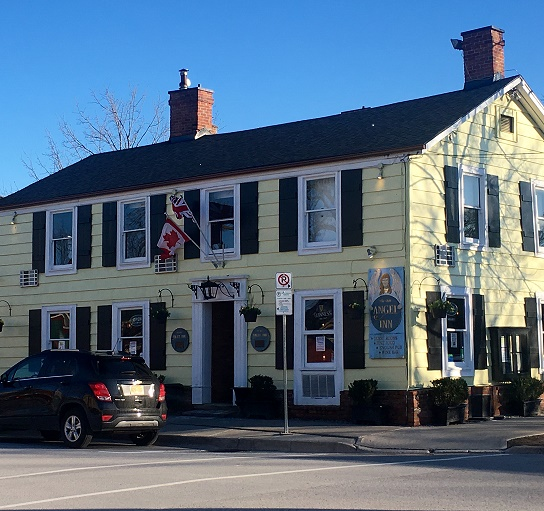
The Olde Angel Inn

== Alleged haunting ==
The Olde Angel Inn is said to have a resident ghost by the name of Captain Colin Swayze. Legend says that he decided to return to the pub one more time to see his true love during the war. Swayze hid in an empty barrel in the basement cellar where he was eventually killed by Americans when they came into the pub.

In a book written by Jeff Belanger, folklore says that if the British flag flies over the Inn, Captain Swayze's ghost will remain harmless. Staff from the pub share stories with Belanger, reporting objects being moved over 10 feet, doors opening without assistance and whistling being heard when no one can be found.
