= St. Catharines Armoury =

Heritage building in St. Catharines, Ontario, Canada

Coordinates: 43.163°N 79.251°W

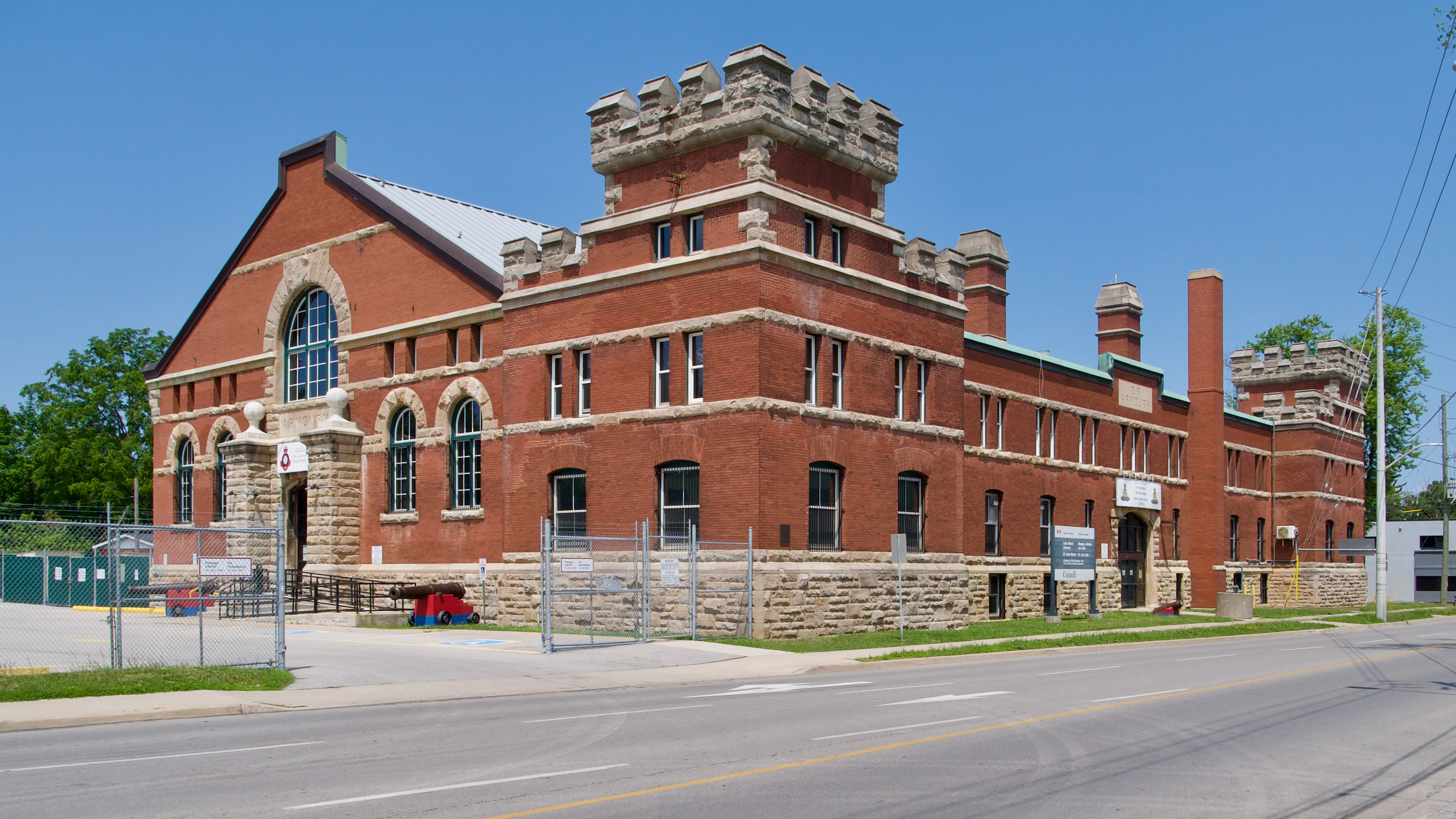
View of the St. Catharines Armoury from Lake Street

The St. Catharines Armoury is a Recognized Federal Heritage Building in St. Catharines, Ontario, Canada. The building is currently used by the Canadian Armed Forces as a drill hall. The armoury trains the Lincoln and Welland Regiment and serves the 10th Battery of the 56th Field Artillery Regiment, RCA.

== History ==
The armoury was built in 1905 to replace a previous drill-shed that was destroyed by an 1898 tornado. Before being paved over for use as a parking lot, grass outside the building was used for military drills. The interior of the building has been used for local gatherings and events, such as a 1907 exhibition by the St. Catharines Horticultural Society.

=== Band ===
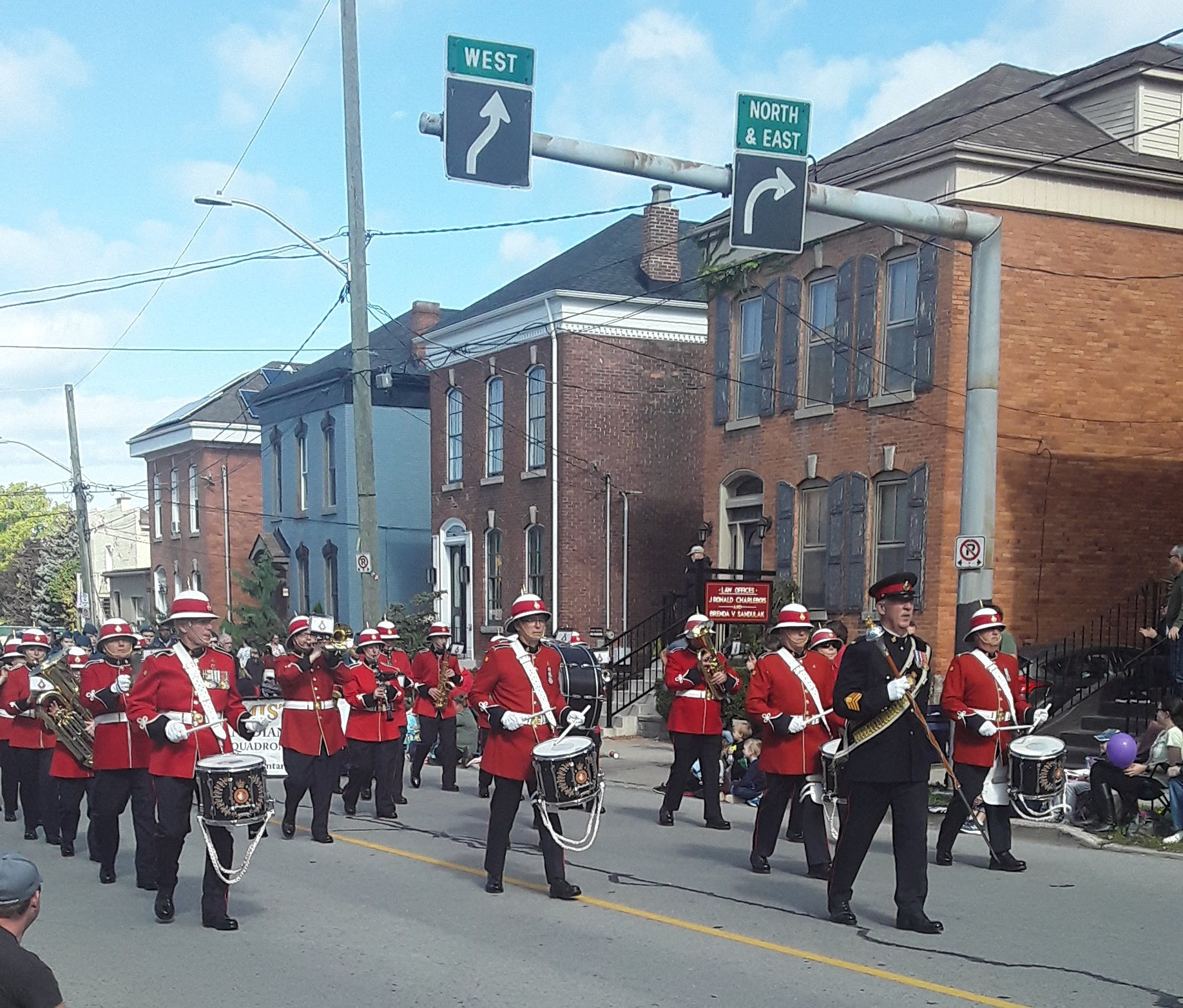
The band performing in the 2022 Grape and Wine Festival parade

The Lincoln and Welland Regiment Association Band used the armoury as a rehearsal venue for more than a century. They performed in local events and festivals. In December 2023, the military concluded that civilian bands could no longer be associated with the army, due to concerns about being confused with official military bands. In 2024, the band associated with the armoury was ordered to leave. The band renamed itself to remove its association with the regiment. The band is composed of civilian volunteer musicians and does not receive government funding. Numerous volunteers were former members of the regiment.

== See also ==
- Downtown St. Catharines
- Lists of Canadian tornadoes and tornado outbreaks
- List of armouries in Canada
- Military history of Canada
