= Dalziel Barn =

Coordinates: 43.777402°N 79.524238°W

The Dalziel Barn is an architecturally distinctive log barn built in 1809 and situated in Vaughan just north of Toronto's Black Creek Pioneer Village. Among its features, the barn had a large gable roof with a double slope on one side. Two gable roofed cupolas sat on the ridge. Although the windows and cupolas are often thought of as extraneous decorative features, they served to ventilate and provide natural lighting to the barn interior. The upper floor cantilevers out, creating an overshoot.

Wheat, hay, and feed were stored in the upper floor and transported down to the bottom where cattle were housed. The overshoot meant that grazing cattle could shelter beneath during inclement weather. This particular arrangement of "barn and stable" was the most economical mode of accommodating produce and livestock of a farm. Since mixed farming and large scale cattle raising began in the 1860s, the Dalziel farmers were ahead of their time.

== See also ==
- List of oldest buildings and structures in Toronto
