= Maison Morisset =

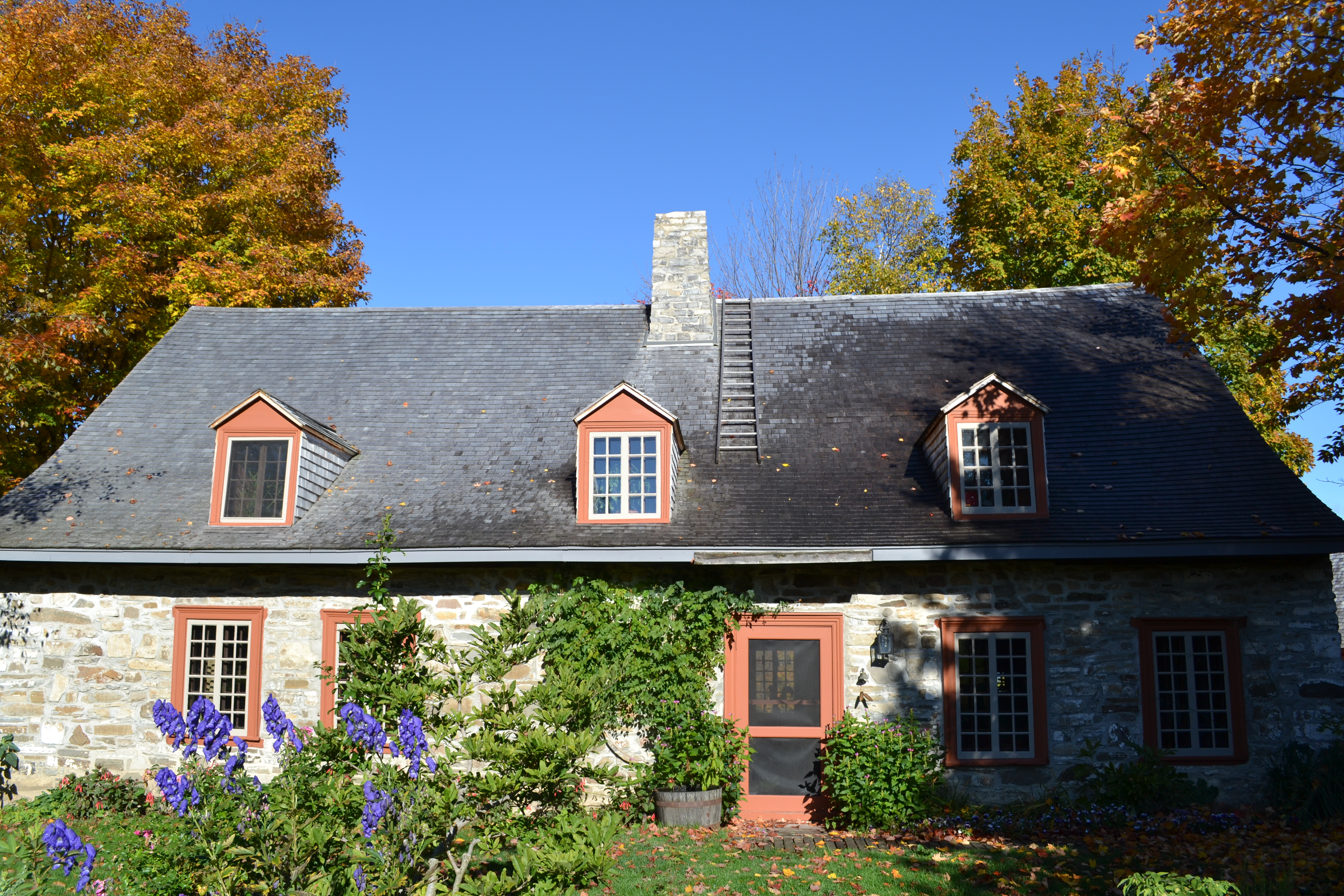
- Draw of the maison Morisset
- Interactive map of the Maison Morisset area
- Alternative names: La Brimbale; Maison Baucher-Dit-Morency; Maison Beauché-Dit-Morency; Maison Beaucher-Dit-Morency; Maison Morency-Demers

General information
- Location: Sainte-Famille (Île d'Orléans), 4417, Chemin Royal, Sainte-Famille, Québec, G0A, Canada
- Coordinates: 46.994722°N 70.925635°W
- Construction started: 1678

The Maison Morisset (also known by its nickname "La Brimbale") is a farmhouse built in 1678 during the seigneurial system of New France. Located in the municipality of Sainte-Famille on Île d'Orléans, the Maison Morisset was classified as a historic site and building by the Ministry of Culture and Communications of Quebec on June 7, 1962. It is reputed to be the oldest stone house in the province of Quebec.

In addition to its historical and architectural interest, the house has appeared in a large number of books and works of art, including several television appearances. It is on the cover of La Fille Laide by Yves Thériault. In 2024, on the American PBS program Finding Your Roots, it was revealed to be the ancestral family home of Canadian singer Alanis Morissette.

== Gallery ==
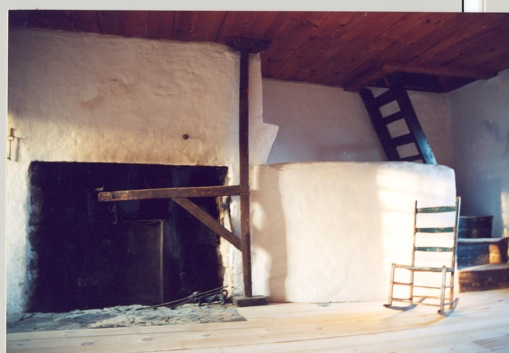

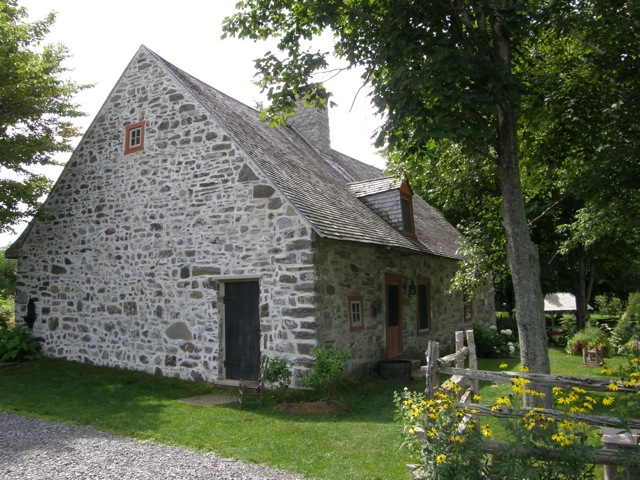

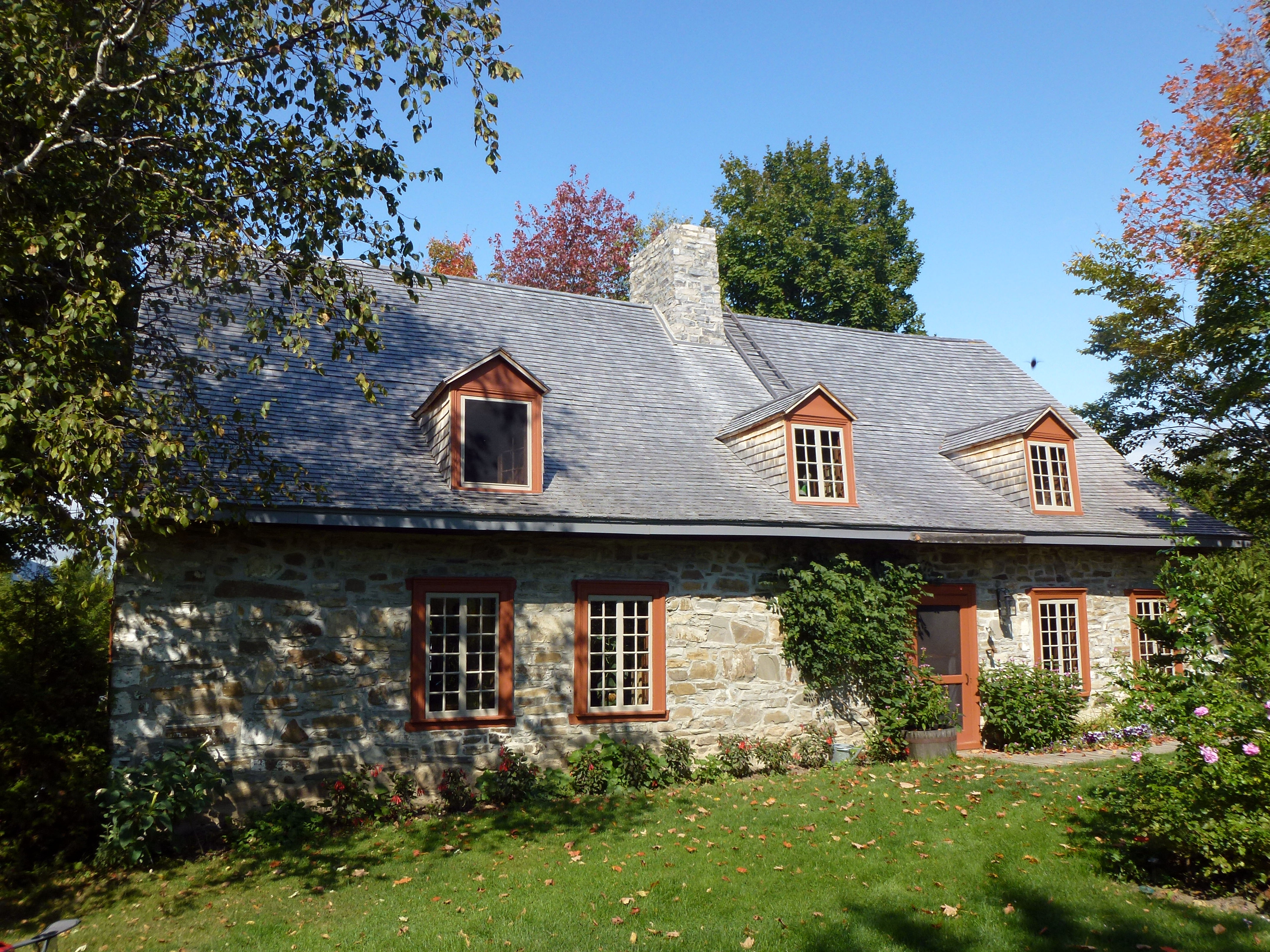
