= Bailey House (Annapolis Royal) =

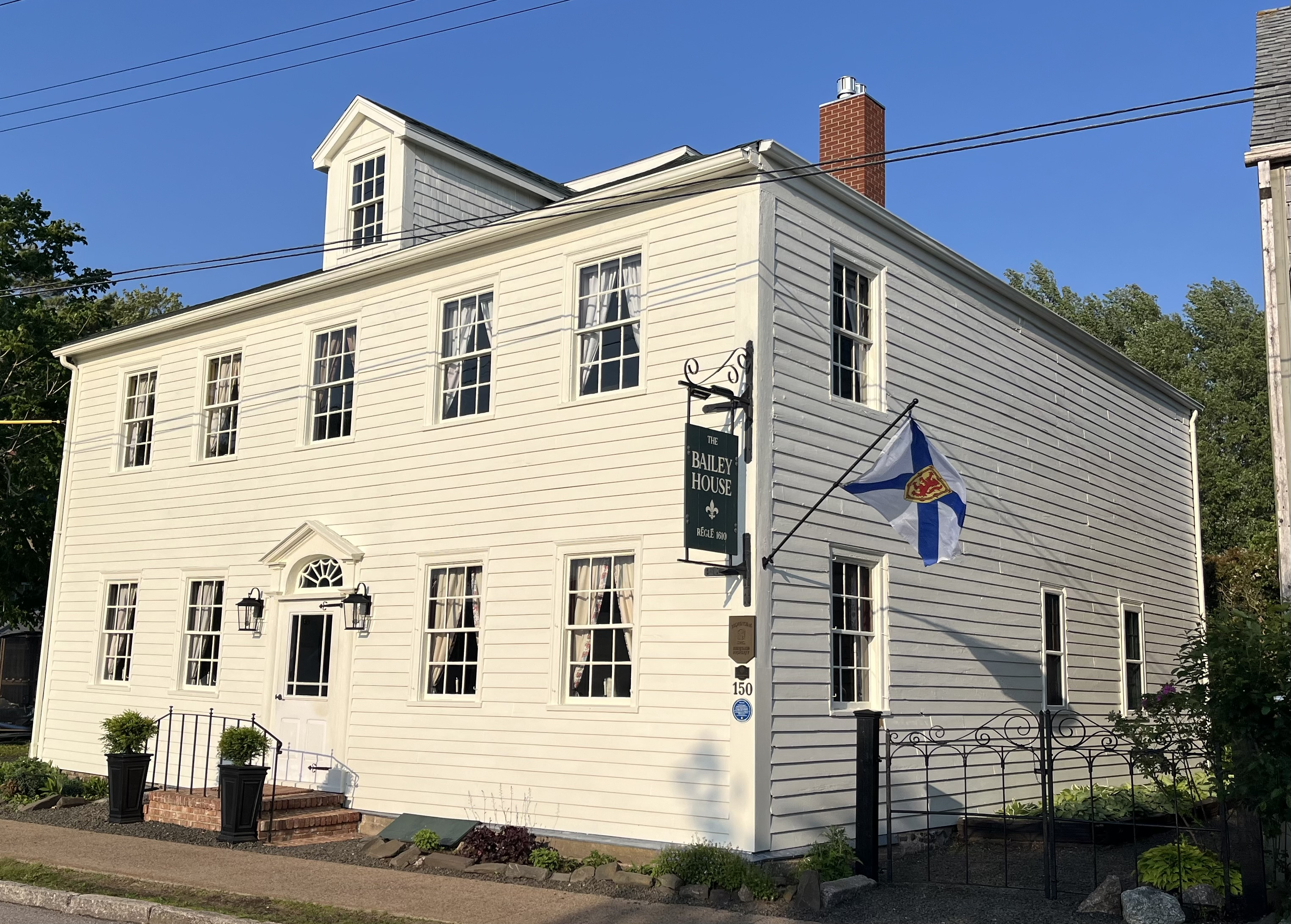

- Location within Nova Scotia

General information
- Architectural style: Georgian ( Federal / Regency )
- Location: 150 Saint George Street, Annapolis Royal, Canada
- Coordinates: 44.74675°N 65.51844°W
- Year built: 1815 - 1820

Design and construction
- Designations

Nova Scotia Heritage Property Act

Website
- https://baileyhouse.ca

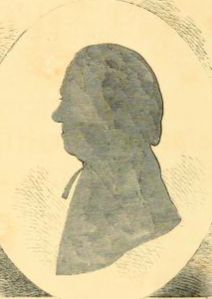
Rev. Jacob Bailey (Father-in-law of "Marm" Bailey)

The Bailey House in Annapolis Royal, Nova Scotia, Canada is a historic house likely built between 1815 and 1820, making it one of the oldest wood frame houses in Canada. It has been operating as a lodging, with interruptions, since at least 1837. The building is a Georgian style and is largely unaltered since its original construction. The house is part of the Annapolis Royal Historic District.

== History ==
There are several origin stories of the Bailey House and its property. The earliest known records are from 1686, when the current property was part of a larger estate of the Seigneur of Port Royal, Alexandre Le Borgne de Belleisle and his family. However, there are no known original records regarding the establishment of the original larger estate or the current house's construction.

Records show that Loyalist settler Joseph Totten obtained the property from John Easson in 1783, although the Bailey House appears not to have been built by this time. There are no known records of when Easson obtained the property, although it appears to be all or part of the same property previously owned by Marie-Madeline Winniett, widow of Captain Edward How. Captain How purchased the property from Anne Douglass, third wife and widow of Samuel Douglass in 1743. Douglass had acquired the property from Jean-Francois Flan in 1733 and Flan purchased the property from Francois du Pont Duvivier in 1707. No known earlier title records exist before this date, most likely due to the destruction of the Seigneurial greffe in 1707.

In 1816, the current property was subdivided from the estate of Joseph Totten and sold to James Robertson, a justice of the peace, merchant and investor. The subdivision aligns with the federal / regency architecture of the building suggesting the transaction coincides with the building of the house. The house closely follows the style of New England architect Asher Benjamin.

By 1837, Elizabeth "Marm" Bailey was living at the house. Elizabeth was the daughter-in-law of the prominent author and Loyalist, Reverend Jacob Bailey. She operated the Bailey House as an "aristocratic boarding house". It was during this time that she served her renowned "Moose Muffle Soup", a fusion of Mi'kmaq and European cuisine. After her death, her daughters continued to operate the boarding house until 1910.

After 1910, the house was rented as a tenement and became dilapidated until restored by then owner, Suzanne Halliburton. Ruth Eisenhauer, a local historian, acquired the house in 1962 and lived there until her death in 1997. At that time, the house and contents were offered to the Nova Scotia Museum. The museum declined the offer and the house later opened as a bed and breakfast.

== Notable Guests ==
According to local tradition, Prince Edward, the father of Queen Victoria and namesake of Prince Edward Island, attended a ball at the Bailey House in 1794 although later research indicates it was not the current building, but an earlier one, that was the venue of the ball.

Thomas Chandler Haliburton, a Nova Scotia politician and first international best-selling author from what is now Canada, was a regular guest at the Bailey House.

Also, according to local tradition, John Campbell, the Marquis of Lorne and Governor General of Canada, visited the Bailey House during an 1880 visit to Nova Scotia

== See also ==
- List of oldest buildings in Canada
- Historic District of Annapolis Royal
- Annapolis Royal (Town)
- Loyalist House
- Prescott House
- Uniacke Estate
