= Montebello Park =

Park in St. Catharines, Ontario, Canada

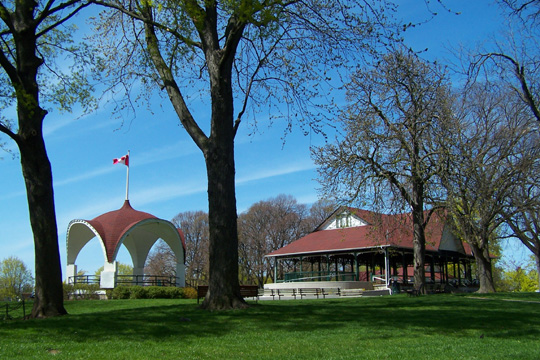
- The band shell and pavilion at Montebello Park
- Interactive map of Montebello Park
- Location: 64 Ontario Street, St. Catharines, Ontario, Canada
- Coordinates: 43.15837°N 79.25139°W
- Designer: Frederick Law Olmsted

Montebello Park is a public park in downtown St. Catharines, Ontario, Canada, designed by Frederick Law Olmsted. It features a commemorative rose garden and an ornamental fountain. The focal point of the park is a historic band shell and pavilion used for festivals. The park and its pavilion are designated under the Ontario Heritage Act.

== Early history ==
The City of St. Catharines purchased the site in 1887 for the city's first public park. The city commissioned Frederick Law Olmsted, who had created New York City's Central Park, to design the park. A pavilion was constructed on the foundation of the original Merritt estate in 1888. A covered circular bandstand modelled after the one built for the Pan-American Exposition in Buffalo, New York, was constructed in the park by Edwin Nicholson. Dances were held upon the pavilion every Saturday night until the 1940s.

In 1948, a case was heard in the Supreme Court of Canada, after the death of a child in Montebello Park after a structure collapsed on her during Victory over Japan Day celebrations. Two other children were injured. The judges decided that park management were negligent in their actions.

== Renovations ==
In 2016, the rose garden was renovated. During these renovations, only the rose garden was closed, with other areas open to the public. In 2018, the pavilion was renovated to repair and replace flooring and railings. The pavilion was not able to be rented or used during the renovation. In 2022, a new playground was built to replace the one previously built in 1998, with improved safety and accessibility features.
