= Williams House (Annapolis Royal) =

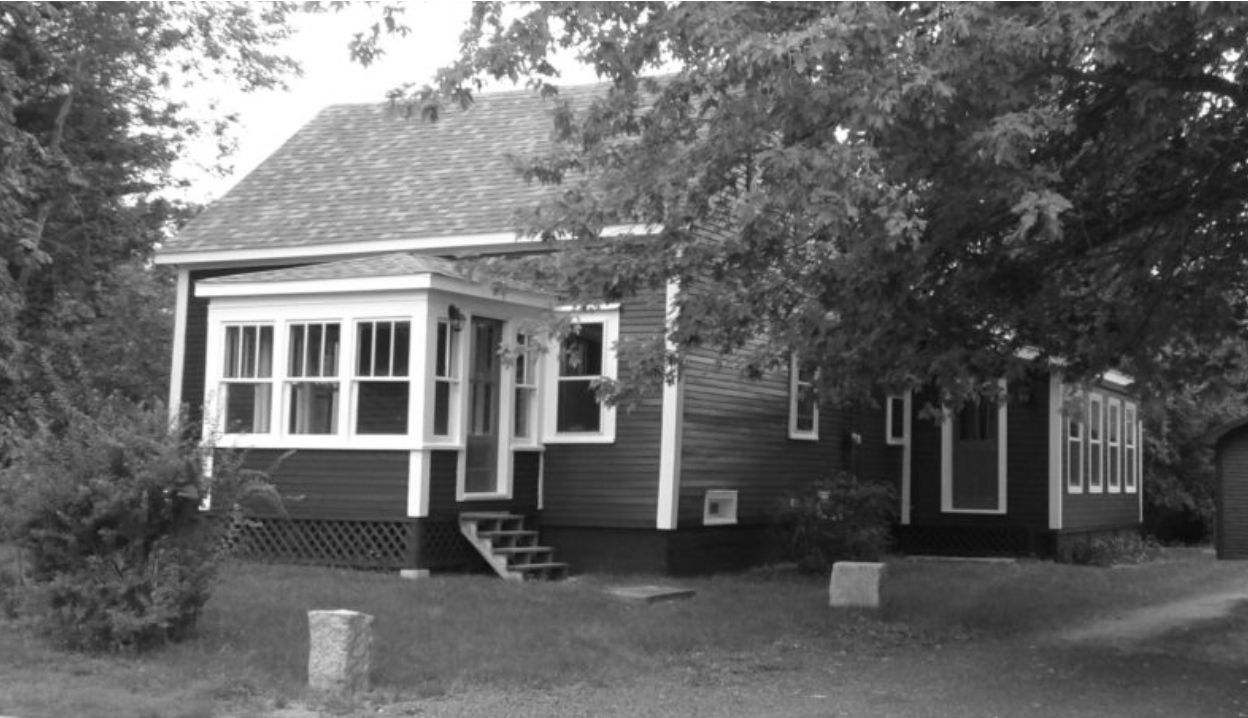
- Ell portion of Williams House

- Location within Nova Scotia

General information
- Architectural style: Georgian
- Location: 167 Saint Anthony Street & 62 Chapel Street, Annapolis Royal, Canada
- Coordinates: 44.7458°N 65.5164°W 44.7471°N 65.5158°W
- Years built: 1715 & 1729

Design and construction
- Designations

Nova Scotia Heritage Property Act

The Williams House is a historic house located in Annapolis Royal, Nova Scotia, Canada. Constructed in 1715, the building was located at 248 Saint George Street (where the Royal Bank is now located) until 1875 when the main portion of the house was moved to 167 Saint Anthony Street. The ell of the house, dating from c. 1730, was moved to 62 Chapel Street. Although the location has moved, it remains one of the oldest wood-framed houses in Canada. The building is part of the Historic District of Annapolis Royal.

== History ==
In the early 18th century, the building was the home of Thomas Williams senior and Thomas Williams junior, who served with the British garrison at Annapolis Royal.

In 1800, the house was the birthplace of Sir Fenwick Williams, a decorated military leader from the Crimean War, British Commander-in-Chief, North America and first native-born Lieutenant Governor of Nova Scotia. At his birth, he was rumoured to be the natural son of Prince Edward, Duke of Kent and Strathearn and Julie de Saint-Laurent, a fact he never disputed.

By 1846, the house was home to Joseph Norman, who served under the Duke of Wellington. His wife, Gregoria Ramona Antonia Reiez, who by her own account, was a mistress of the Duke of Wellington.

In 1874, the building was moved to enable the construction of the Union Bank of Halifax building, now the Royal Bank of Canada. The main part of the Williams house is now located at 167 St Anthony Street and the ell is at 62 Chapel Street.

Both parts of the Williams House are now private residences.

== See also ==
- Annapolis Royal (Town)
- Historic District of Annapolis Royal
