= Sinclair Inn =

Museum, former inn, and historic site in Annapolis Royal, Canada

Sinclair Inn / Farmer's Hotel National Historic Site of Canada
- Lieu historique national du Canada de l'Auberge-Sinclair / Hôtel-Farmer's (French)
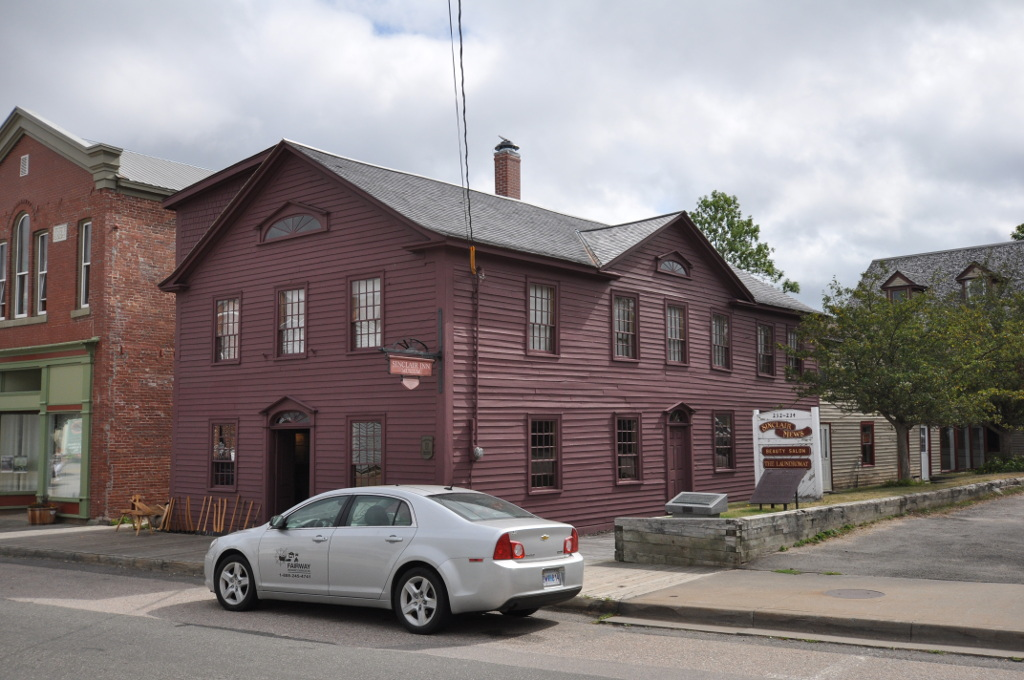

- Location within Nova Scotia
- Former names: Farmer's Hotel, Temperance House, Anderson's Hotel & Annapolis Royal Hotel

General information
- Architectural style: Acadian & Georgian
- Location: 230 Saint George Street, Historic District of Annapolis Royal, Annapolis Royal city, Nova Scotia province., Canada
- Coordinates: 44.74467°N 65.51926°W
- Year built: 1708 1711 1781

Design and construction
- Designations

National Historic Site of Canada
- Official name: Sinclair Inn / Farmer's Hotel National Historic Site of Canada
- Designated: 1983-06-13

Nova Scotia Heritage Property Act

Website
- https://annapolisheritagesociety.com/sinclair-inn-museum/

The Sinclair Inn is an inn located in Annapolis Royal, Nova Scotia (Canada). Resulting from the amalgamation of two early eighteenth-century houses, it is one of the only two surviving Acadian buildings in the Annapolis Royal region to have survived from before the Great Upheaval (1750-1780), with the other being the De Gannes-Cosby House. It was also the site of the first Masonic lodge in Canada in 1738. It was used as an inn between 1780 and 1950. It was then converted into a museum. The building was designated a National Historic Site of Canada in 1983. It was also listed as a municipal heritage property in 1982 and as a provincial heritage property in 1992.

== Location ==
The Sinclair Inn is located at 230 St. George Street in downtown Annapolis Royal, Nova Scotia, Canada. It is within the Annapolis Royal Historic District, designated a National Historic Site of Canada.

== History ==
The Sinclair Inn was created by combining two pre-existing houses. The first was built between 1708 and 1710 for Jean-Baptiste Soullard, a gunsmith and silversmith at the Port-Royal garrison in Acadia. The second, the rear two-thirds, was built in 1711 for Dr. William Skene, a surgeon in the British garrison at Fort Anne (the fort was transferred to Great Britain following the signing of the Treaty of Utrecht in 1713). The walls of Skeene House are made of wattle and daub.

In 1738, Skene House hosted the first meeting of a Masonic lodge in Canada, founded by Erasmus James Philipps, a member of the Nova Scotia Council.

In 1781, the German-born innkeeper Frederick Sinclair (born Zeiglar) combined the two houses to form an inn, adding a door to the front and a dormer window to the gable wall, which added a Georgian style to the building. Sinclair also decided to build a second story on Skene House, giving the inn its current shape. Before the conversion of the Soullard and Skene houses, Sinclair had run his inn in the Adams-Ritchie house. On February 24, 1787, he bought a slave named Jane for 21 British pounds from Richard Betts of New York. Just before 1800, Frederick Sinclair announced his desire to return to Hanover and put his properties in Annapolis and Granville up for sale. He fell ill and died at the end of 1799. His widow, Mary, continued to run the inn. On his death in 1814, his daughter Hannah inherited the inn. It then passed into the hands of Thomas Edison, a carpenter, before being sold in 1818 to Antonio Gavaza.

Antonio Gavaza, an Italian immigrant, arrived in Annapolis Royal in the early 19th century. He bought the inn for 350 pounds. And in 1825, he bought an adjacent lot to the south, where he built a general store with lodging for himself on the second floor. The inn continued to operate, but it is unclear whether Gavaza operated directly or by lease. In 1858, Thomas A. Gavaza, Antonio's son, sold the inn to Simon Bishop for 550 pounds. Simon Bishop soon sold the inn to Charles Starratt, who sold it back to Bishop. Unable to pay the mortgage, Bishop declared bankruptcy, and the inn was sold at auction to Haligonian merchants Alexander McLeod, Thomas Bayne, and John W. Sinclair for 130 pounds. They sold the inn to Robert Wyllie of Granville in 1863, who then sold it to William Anderson from Annapolis Royal in 1865. Anderson operated the inn under the name Temperance House. On his death, the inn passed into the hands of his son Eben, who changed the name to Anderson's Hotel. Unable to pay the mortgage, he sold the inn at auction for C$1,610 to Aubrey S. Hunt and J. Johnstone Hunt in 1896. A few months later it was sold to Hugh Gillis, a lawyer, for C$1,860. On January 12, 1987, the inn was sold to David Riordan for $2,175.

The Riordans were a family of innkeepers involved in lodging in Annapolis Royal. In addition to the Sinclair Inn, they operated the Dominion Hotel, the Queen Hotel, and Clifton House. David owned both the Queen Hotel and the Sinclair Inn. In 1910, David sold the Inn to William 'Bill' Edwards and moved to British Columbia to run a hotel and then go into ranching. Bill Edwards was an eccentric character who owned a pet monkey, which the Annapolis Spectator newspaper had fun describing. He was also known for his love of horses. He sold the inn in 1922 and died the following year.

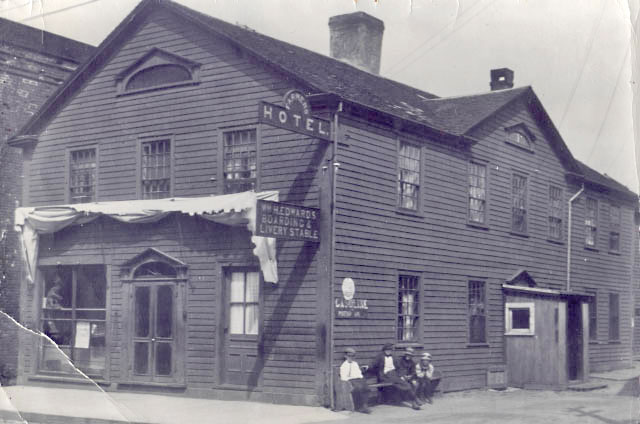
Sinclair Inn (1930)

There is little information about the history of the inn, which was owned by James and Lalia Wallace from Middleton, Nova Scotia. They operated the inn under the name Annapolis Royal Hotel. In 1938, they sold the business to Stewart and Jean Mills of Granville. Stewart Mills, a successful businessman, obtained the Ford automobile dealership for Annapolis County in 1931. In addition to the inn, he bought land for a filling station, which he leased from Irving Oil in the late 1930s. He also owned a taxi service and a bus service linking Victoria Beach and Digby to Annapolis Royal. Although he sold alcohol at his service station, he was a sober man and the Sinclair Inn did not have a liquor license. Stewart died of pneumonia in Annapolis Royal in 1956. His widow put the inn up for sale, ending the lodging business in the building almost 150 years after it opened.

In 1981, in recognition of the building's historic value, the National Trust for Canada purchased the inn and restored the deteriorating structure. The Inn was then transferred to the Annapolis Heritage Society to house a museum. In the late 1990s, the Society began work on the building, including repairing the siding and shingles on the roof.

On January 20, 1982, the Town of Annapolis Royal listed the Inn as a municipal heritage property. The Sinclair Inn was designated a National Historic Site of Canada on June 13, 1983, by the Historic Sites and Monuments Board of Canada. The Province of Nova Scotia designated the Inn as a Provincial Heritage Property on June 14, 1991.

== Architecture ==
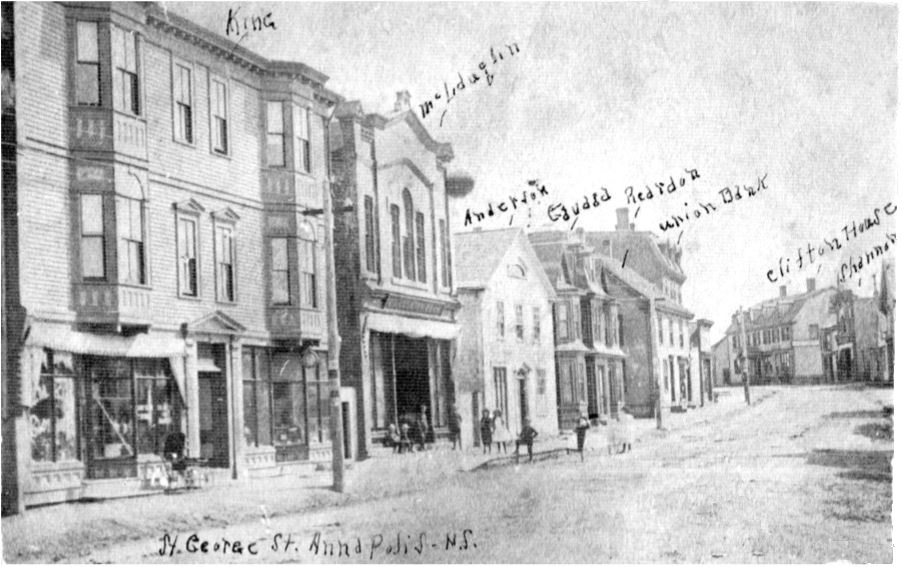
The Sinclair Inn is labelled “Anderson” (Late 19th century)

Built between 1708 and 1710, the Sinclair Inn is one of the two only surviving Acadian structures in the Annapolis Royal region from before the Great Upheaval.

The foundation of part of the Skene house is located on a crawl space with mortared fieldstone walls. The section of the Soullard house rests on a wooden base laid directly on the ground. The floor is made up of wide, axe-cut beams. The framework of the hotel is half-timbered with discharges. The whole structure is held together by mortise and tenon joints consolidated with wooden pins. The walls of the Soullard house have no infill. The walls of the Skene house are filled with wattle and daub. On the outside, the half-timbering was covered with wooden planks up to 53 cm wide. The structure was covered with a wood cladding. By incorporating two buildings, the inn blends Acadian architecture techniques with English vernacular styles.

The sash windows have 8 panes in the lower section and 12 in the upper section, which is characteristic of Georgian architecture. The transoms and gable windows have an ellipsoidal shape, a style that is quite common in the late Georgian period. The shape of the transoms has become the logo of the Annapolis Heritage Society.

On the interior walls of the cob section, a thin layer of clay or mud was added to give the smoothest possible finish. This finishing is often covered with wallpaper or paint. From the early eighteenth century onwards, plaster was laid on laths as a more effective method of reducing the amount of cold air entering the building. The ceiling was covered with wooden laths painted white.

== Painted room ==
During the 1960s, a water leak from the roof revealed that one of the roof rooms had walls covered with mural paintings, underneath the wallpaper. Subsequent investigations revealed that all the walls in the room were covered in paint. The artist and date of creation are unknown, but it is possible that this is the room that was used by the Masonic lodge. A visitor to the inn in 1848 referred to the fact that the walls of his room were painted. It could be that wallpaper covered the paintings from the late nineteenth century onwards. In the summer of 2016, the Annapolis Heritage Society hired an expert to remove the wallpaper, revealing the full extent of the paintings.

== Tourism ==
The Sinclair Inn Museum is open from June to October. The museum focuses on the building's architectural history and the various construction techniques used over the years. Visitors can also see the Painted Room, which was restored in 2016 and features paintings on the walls.

== Appendix ==
=== Related articles ===
- List of oldest buildings in Canada
- Historic District of Annapolis Royal
- Annapolis Royal (Town)
- De Gannes-Cosby House

=== External links ===
- Sinclair Inn Listing in the Canadian Register of Historic Places (Parks Canada)
- Sinclair Inn Listing as a National Historic Site (Parks Canada)
- Sinclair Inn Listing at the Heritage Trust of Nova Scotia
- Annapolis Heritage Society
