= Bonnett House =

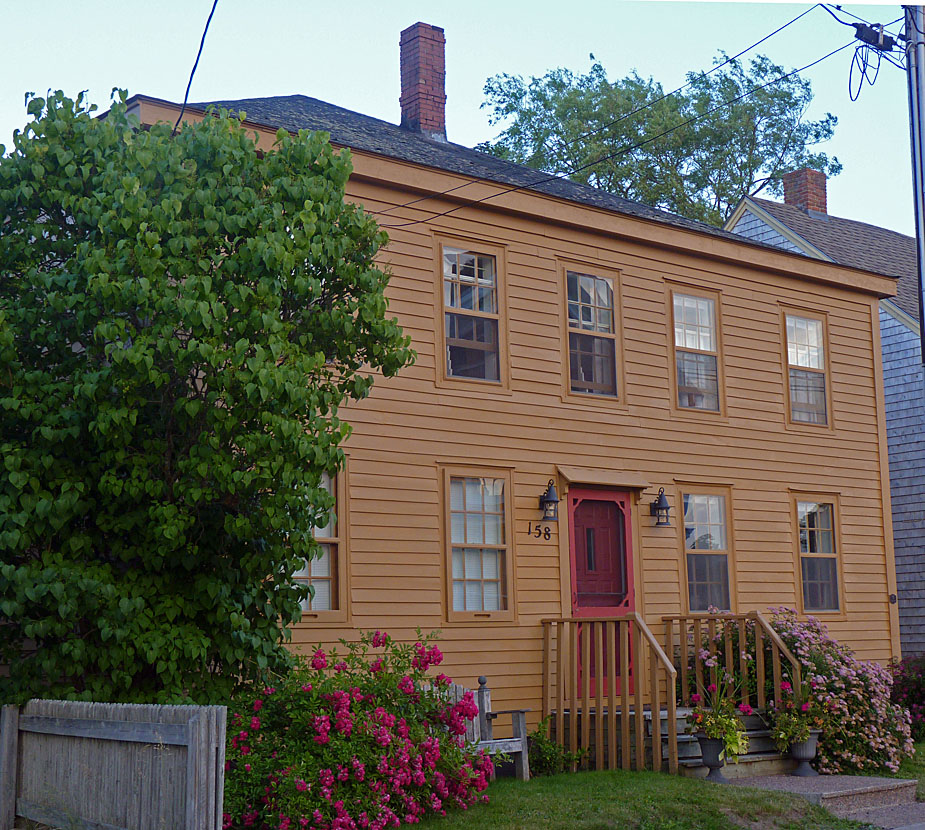

- Location within Nova Scotia

General information
- Architectural style: Georgian
- Location: 158 Saint George Street, Annapolis Royal, Canada
- Coordinates: 44.74653°N 65.51851°W
- Year built: 1773

Design and construction
- Designations

Nova Scotia Heritage Property Act

Website
- https://bonnetthouseartgallery.ca

The Bonnett House in Annapolis Royal, Nova Scotia, Canada is a historic house built around 1773, making it one of the oldest wood-frame houses in Canada. The building is a Georgian style and is largely unaltered since its original construction. The house is part of the Annapolis Royal Historic District.

== History ==
The parcel of land on which the Bonnett House resides can be traced back to 1699, with the first known owner being Jean Chrysostome Loppinot, attorney-general of Acadia. At least two other dwellings were constructed on the land between 1699 and 1773, these structures being destroyed by fire in 1708 and, again, in 1710.

By 1773, Pardon Sanders an artificer at Fort Anne, built the current house. The exact date has been confirmed through dendrochronology.

In 1783, Sanders disposed of the property to Frederic Davoue, a Loyalist from New York, who quickly sold the house to merchant David Bonnett. Ownership was then transferred to his son Isaac Bonnett and later to another son, Peter Bonnett, High Sheriff of Annapolis Royal.

In 1853, ownership was transferred to Charles Starratt.

From 1930 until 1990, it was owned of the Burrell and related Brothers families.

Today the house is used as an art gallery.

== See also ==
- Annapolis Royal (Town)
- Historic District of Annapolis Royal
