= Annapolis County Court House =

Annapolis County Court House National Historic Site of Canada
- Lieu historique national du Canada du Palais-de-Justice-du-Comté-d'Annapolis (French)
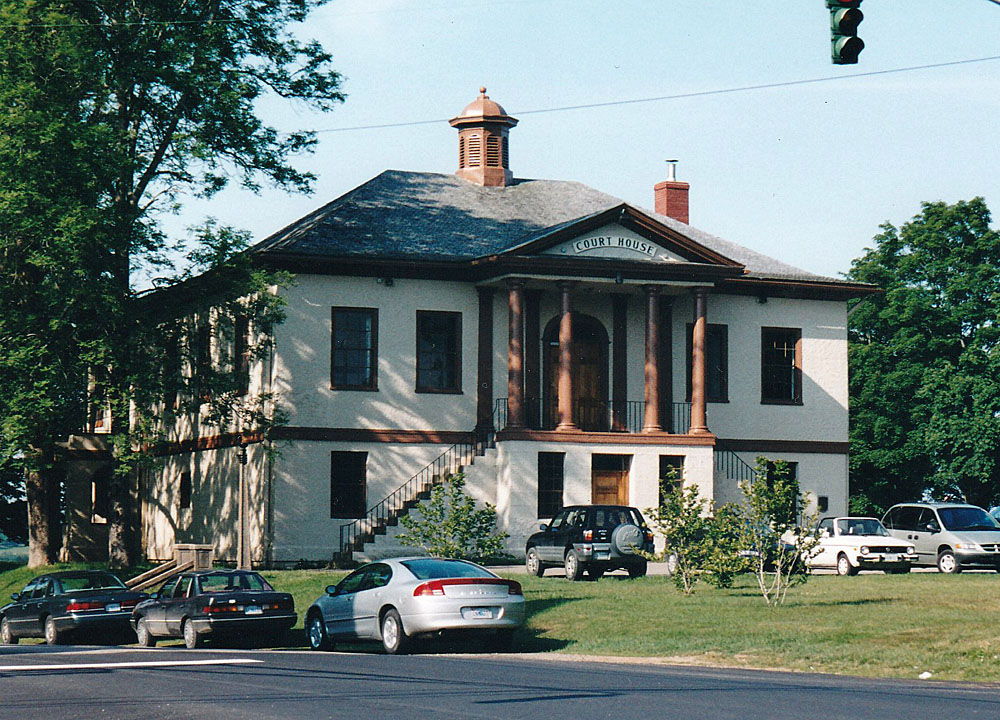

- Location within Nova Scotia

General information
- Architectural style: Palladian
- Location: 377 Saint George Street, Annapolis Royal, Canada
- Coordinates: 44.74173°N 65.51623°W
- Year built: 1837

Design and construction
- Designations

National Historic Site of Canada
- Official name: Annapolis County Court House National Historic Site of Canada
- Designated: 1991-11-22

Nova Scotia Heritage Property Act

Website
- https://www.courts.ns.ca/locations/digby

The Annapolis County Courthouse is a courthouse located in Annapolis Royal, Nova Scotia, Canada. It was built in 1837 by Francis LeCain and was enlarged in 1923. The building is designated a National Historic Site of Canada. It is part of the Historic District of Annapolis Royal and is one of the oldest courthouses in Canada still in use.

== History ==
The Annapolis County Courthouse was built in 1837 by contractor Francis LeCain, who designed it in conjunction with the county grand jury, a common practice in Nova Scotia in the first half of the 19th century. It replaces a wooden courthouse and prison built in 1793 and destroyed by fire in 1836. It was built according to the Palladian style, typical of the courthouses of the British Empire at the time.

It was enlarged in 1923 according to the plans of architect Leslie R. Fairn. It was during this addition that the octagonal dome at the top and the stucco coating of the first floor were added.

== Architecture ==
The Annapolis County Courthouse is a rectangular building with a symmetrical five-opening facade and a central door. It has a rump roof with an octagonal dome at the top and an imposing portico with columns. The ground floor is covered with rustic stone and the second floor and annex are covered with stucco.

As with many courthouses of this form in Canada, the ground floor serves as a prison, while the second floor serves as a courtroom.

== See also ==
- List of oldest buildings in Canada
- Historic District of Annapolis Royal
- Annapolis Royal (Town)
