= De Gannes-Cosby House =

de Gannes-Cosby House National Historic Site of Canada
- Lieu historique national de la Maison-de-Gannes-Cosby (French)
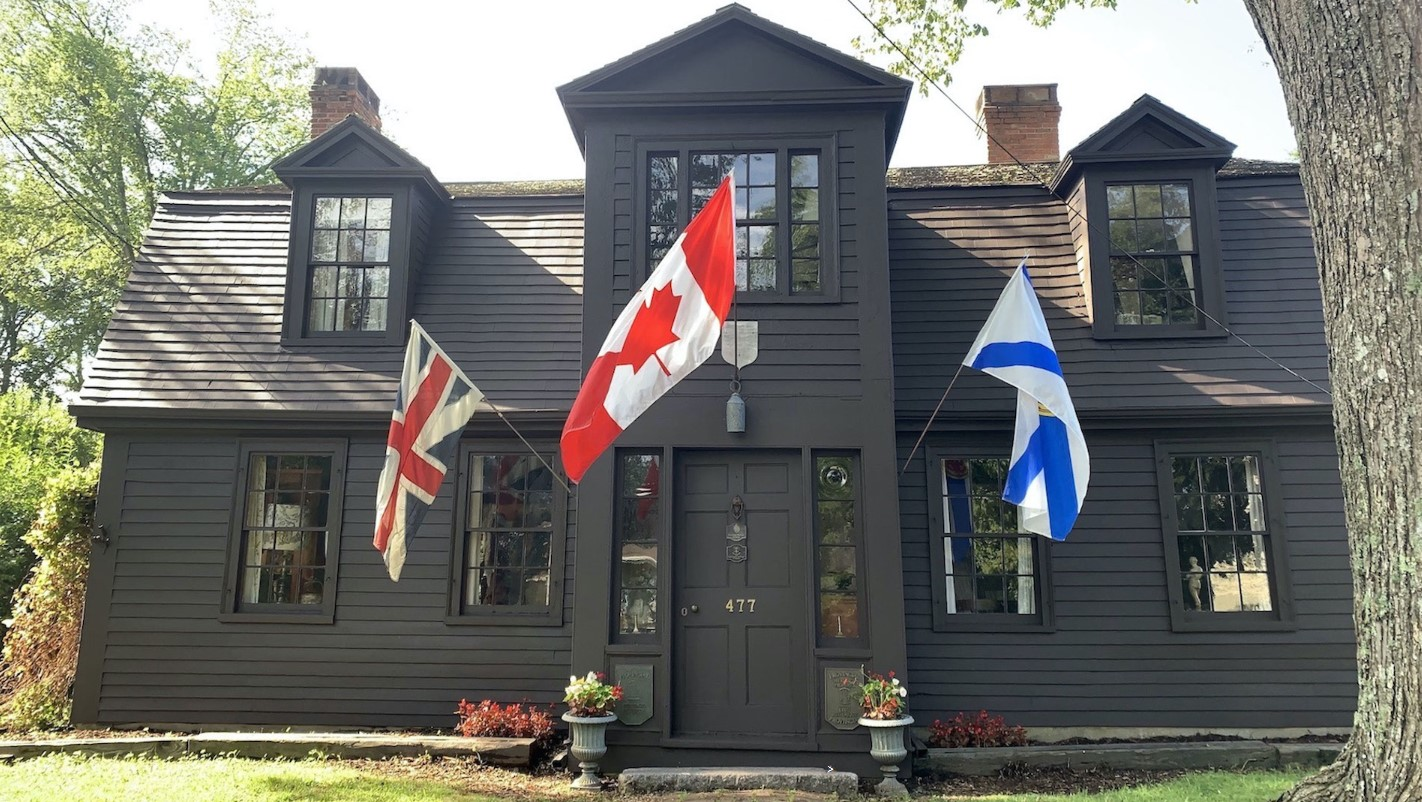

- Location within Nova Scotia

General information
- Architectural style: Acadian
- Location: 477 Saint George Street, Annapolis Royal, Canada
- Coordinates: 44.74125°N 65.51236°W
- Year built: 1708

Design and construction
- Designations

National Historic Site of Canada
- Official name: de Gannes-Cosby House National Historic Site of Canada
- Designated: 2019-06-05

Nova Scotia Heritage Property Act

Website
- https://parks.canada.ca/culture/designation/lieu-site/de-gannes-cosby

The de Gannes-Cosby House in the Annapolis Royal Historic District is the oldest wood framed building in Canada. It is also the world's oldest existing building in the Acadian style. It was built in 1708 by Major Louis-Joseph de Gannes de Falaise, a French nobleman and officer stationed at the French colony of Port Royal in what is today the province of Nova Scotia. The house is built on the foundations of an earlier house destroyed during the 1707 Siege of Port Royal. The core house was a simple wattle and daub construction, but has since been covered in wooden shingles and enlarged in the 19th and 20th centuries. It has been designated as a National Historic Site and is part of the Annapolis Royal Historic District.

== History ==
In 1708, Louis de Gannes de Falaise and his wife, Marguerite Leneuf de La Vallière, built the house. Marguerite was the daughter of Michel Leneuf de la Vallière de Beaubassin, the Governor of Acadia from 1678 to 1684. After the Siege of Port Royal (1710), de Gannes forfeited the house to the British and returned to his native France.

In 1727, Major Alexander Cosby was appointed Lieutenant-Governor of the Town and Fort of Annapolis Royal and the property went with the position. Cosby was the brother-in-law of Nova Scotia Governor Richard Philipps. Admiral Phillips Cosby, son of Alexander, grew up at the house. Philipps Cosby was the captain of various British ships during the American Revolutionary War, Siege of Louisbourg and the Battle of the Plains of Abraham.

From 1788 to 1809, the heirs of the Cosby family rented the house through Loyalist lawyer Thomas Henry Barclay, who had been given power of attorney.

From 1809, the house was in the possession of the Reverend Cyrus Perkins, rector of St Luke's Church in Annapolis Royal.

In 1816, the property was bought by Dr. George Henkell, who was the garrison surgeon in Annapolis Royal since 1796. The house stayed within the family for the next few decades.

In 1877, it was sold to master mariner Benjamin Nickerson.

In 1921, the house was purchased by Arthur W. Banks and remained with the family until 1983.

In 1983, the current family obtained the property, who have been major advocates of its place in Acadian, Nova Scotian and Canadian history.

Though designated a National historic Site in 2019, the private home was not officially plaqued until 2023 because of COVID-19. A dedication ceremony occurred on 19 August 2023.

== See also ==
- List of oldest buildings in Canada
- Historic District of Annapolis Royal
- Annapolis Royal (Town)
- Sinclair Inn
