= O'Dell House Museum =

- Location within Nova Scotia

General information
- Architectural style: Victorian and Greek Revival
- Location: 136 Saint George Street, Annapolis Royal, Canada
- Coordinates: 44.74713°N 65.51833°W
- Year built: 1869

Design and construction
- Designations

Nova Scotia Heritage Property Act

Website
- https://annapolisheritagesociety.com/odell-house-museum/

The O'Dell House Museum is a house-museum located in Annapolis Royal, Nova Scotia, Canada which presents a collection of artefacts important to the history of Annapolis Royal. The museum also houses the Annapolis Heritage Society's Genealogy Centre and its Archive and Collections Centre. The original building was constructed in 1869 by Nova Scotia Pony Express rider, Corey O’Dell. A Victorian house in Greek Revival style, it is part of the Historic District of Annapolis Royal.

== History ==
Corey O’Dell, who was an innkeeper and rider for the Nova Scotia Pony Express, built the house in 1869. The building passed to his son, Griffin, and remained in the family until the 1950s. The family used it as a residence, hotel and retail shop. In 1969, it was converted to the current museum. Previous to the opening of the O'Dell House Museum, the local collection of artefacts and archives were stored at the Officer's Quarters at Fort Anne.

== Tourism ==
The O'Dell House Museum is managed by the Annapolis Heritage Society. The house presents a collection of mainly 19th-century items related to the history of Annapolis Royal and the surrounding area. The Annapolis Heritage Society's Genealogy Centre provides extensive research on families from the Annapolis Valley region, notably those of Acadian heritage.

The museum is open seasonally. Admission is by donation.

== See also ==
- Annapolis Royal (Town)
- Historic District of Annapolis Royal
