= Historic District of Annapolis Royal =

Historic District of Annapolis Royal Arrondissement-Historique-d'Annapolis Royal (French)
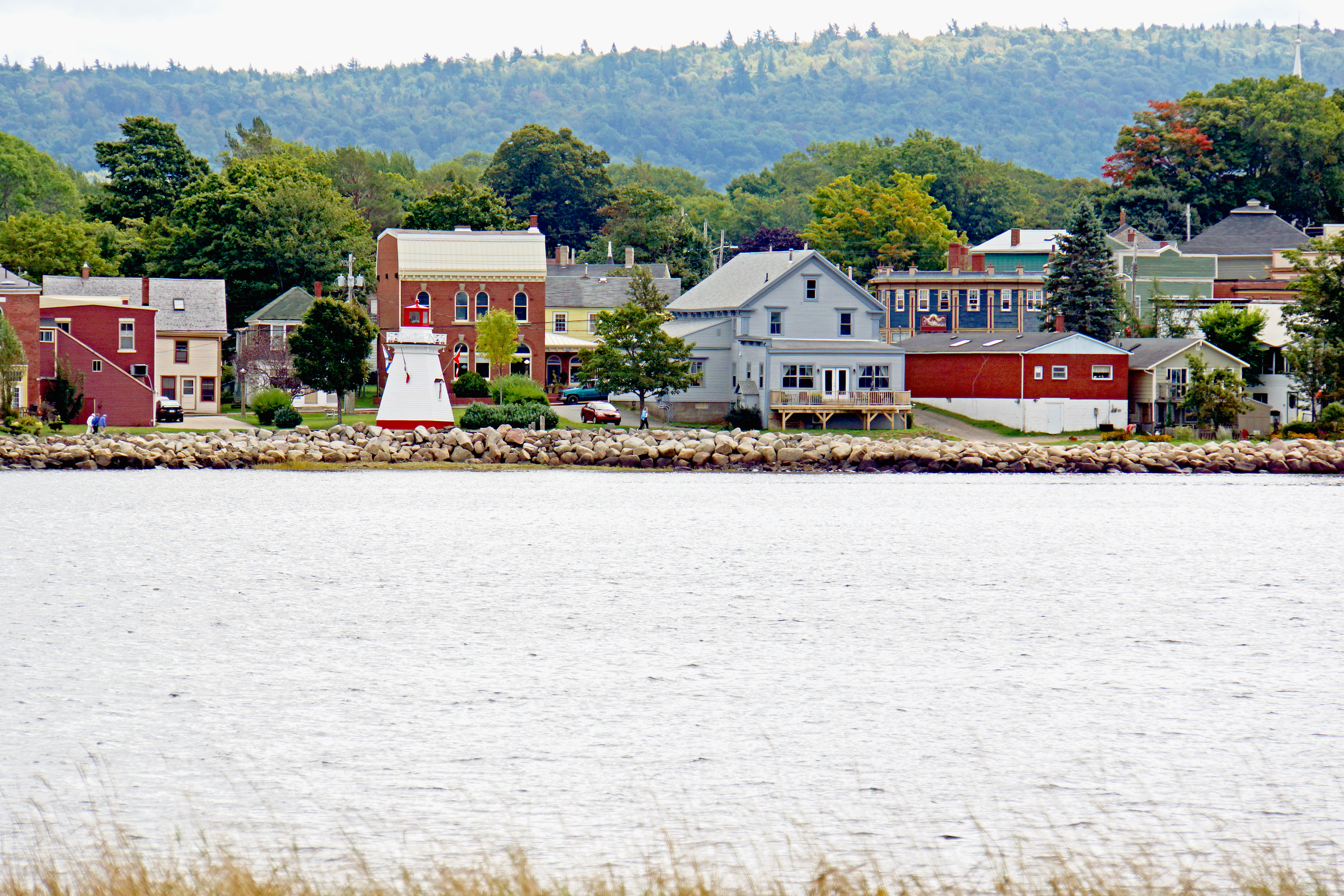
- Interactive map of Historic District of Annapolis Royal
- Coordinates: 44.741°N 65.515°W
- Country: Canada
- Province: Nova Scotia
- Town: Annapolis Royal

National Historic Site of Canada
- Official name: Annapolis Royal Historic District National Historic Site of Canada
- Designated: 1994-06-05

Nova Scotia Heritage Property Act

For the main article on the town, see Annapolis Royal

The Historic District of Annapolis Royal is the historic centre of the town of Annapolis Royal, Nova Scotia, Canada. The Annapolis Basin is the location of the earliest permanent European settlement in North America north of St. Augustine, Florida. The land on which the Historic District itself is situated has had permanent European habitation since at least 1629.

The Historic District was designated a National Historic Site of Canada on 5 June 1994.

== History ==
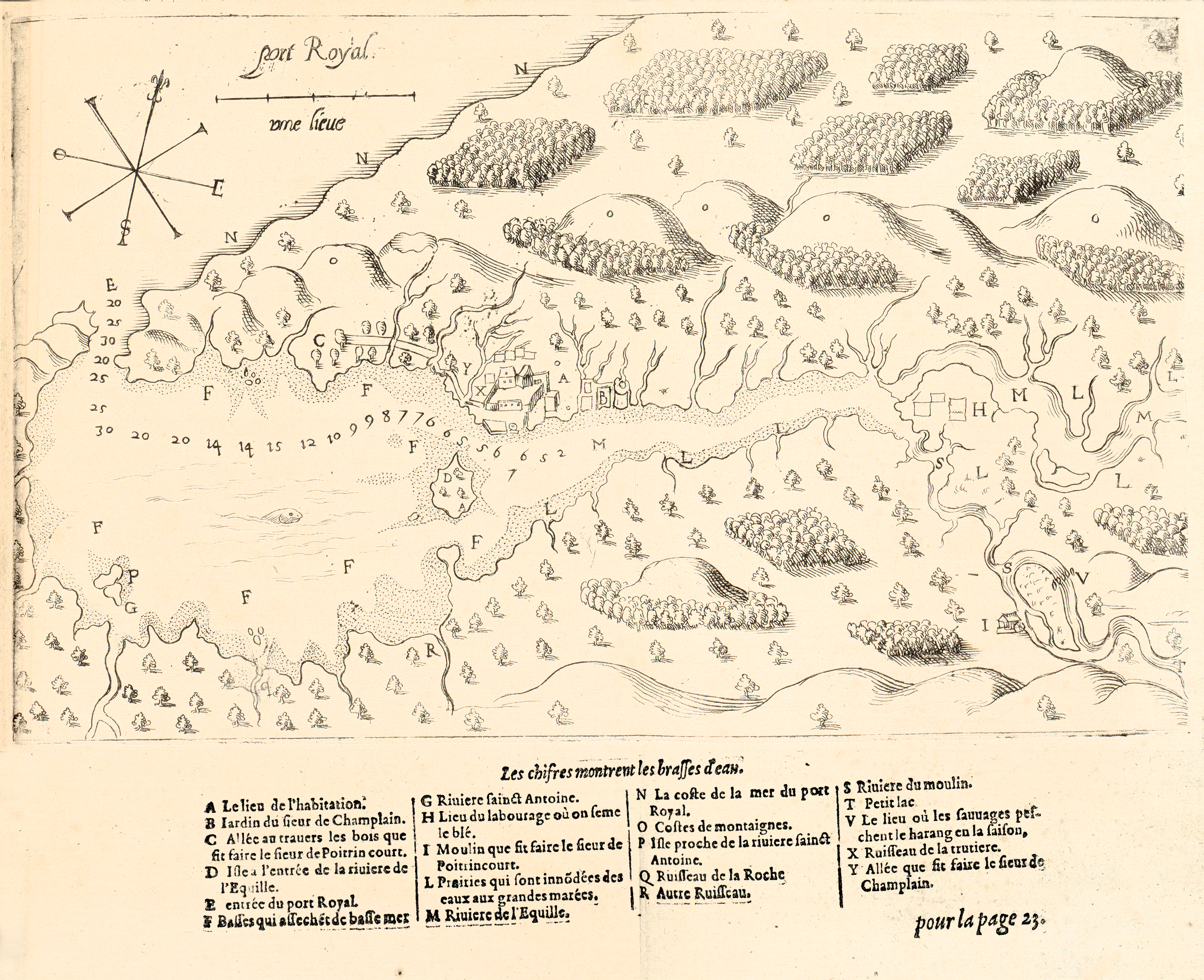
Annapolis Royal (Port Royal) area in 1613

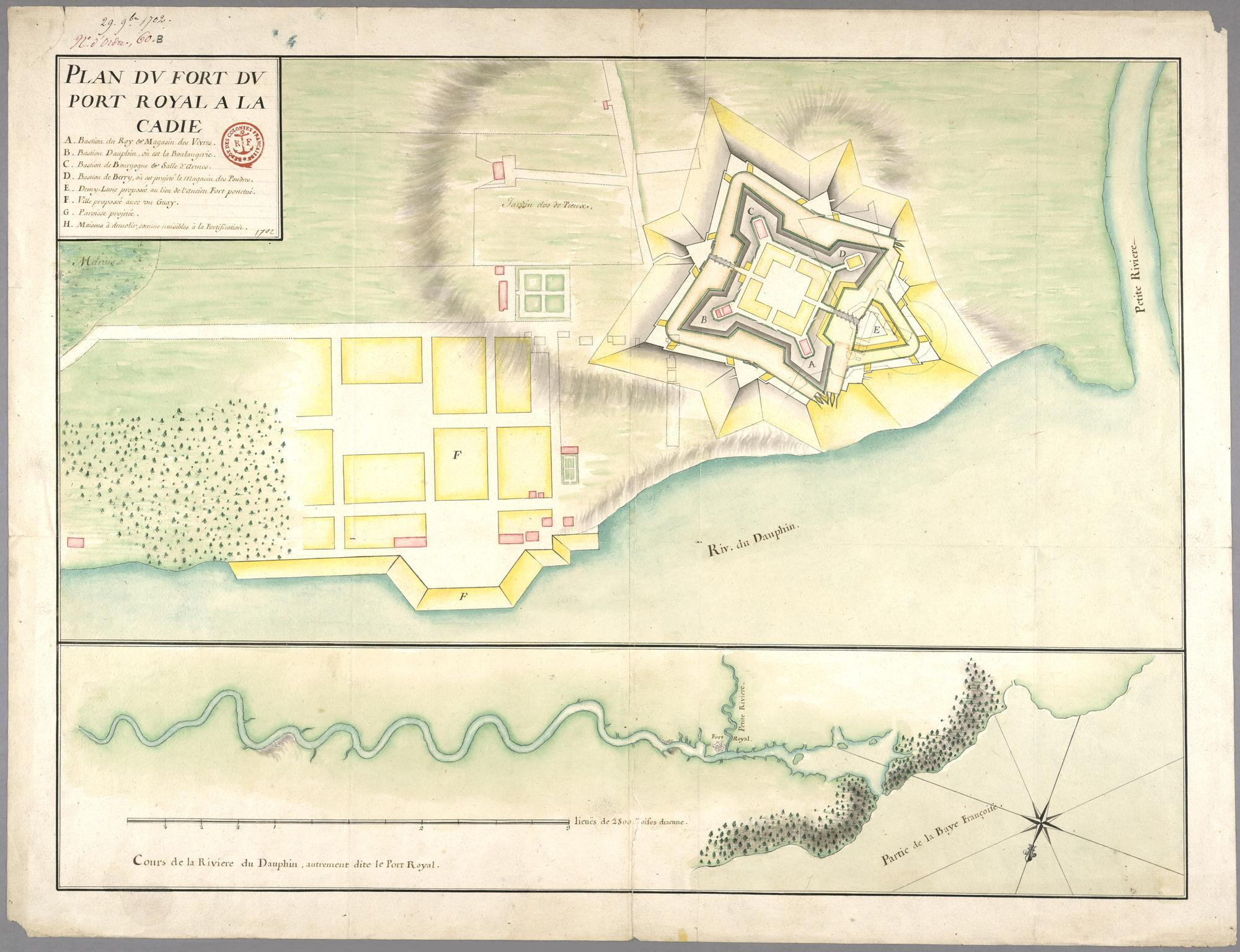
Annapolis Royal (Port Royal) in 1702

In 1605, France founded Port-Royal on the Annapolis Basin. This colony was raided by the English in 1613 and was the site of a short-lived Scottish colony at Charles Fort from 1629. By 1630, urban structures existed to the east of the fort. The area was ceded back to France in 1632. The principal thoroughfare, Saint George Street, was distinct by 1686. After numerous attacks, claims of ownership and changes of control, the town was finally ceded to the British in the Peace of Utrecht of 1713. The town was renamed Annapolis Royal and served as the capital of the colony of Nova Scotia until it moved to Halifax in 1749. Subsequently, the town drew its living from ship building, brick making and forestry.

Having experienced a peaceful existence since the American Raid on Annapolis Royal of 1781, the town has conserved structures from all its periods with the exception of the years 1605 to 1707.

== Architecture ==
The town presents a vast sample of maritime and Canadian architecture of the 18th, 19th and early 20th centuries. Considered one of the oldest inhabited in the country, the town has preserved its fortifications as well as the old cemetery, the oldest in the country. The district itself includes 135 heritage buildings.

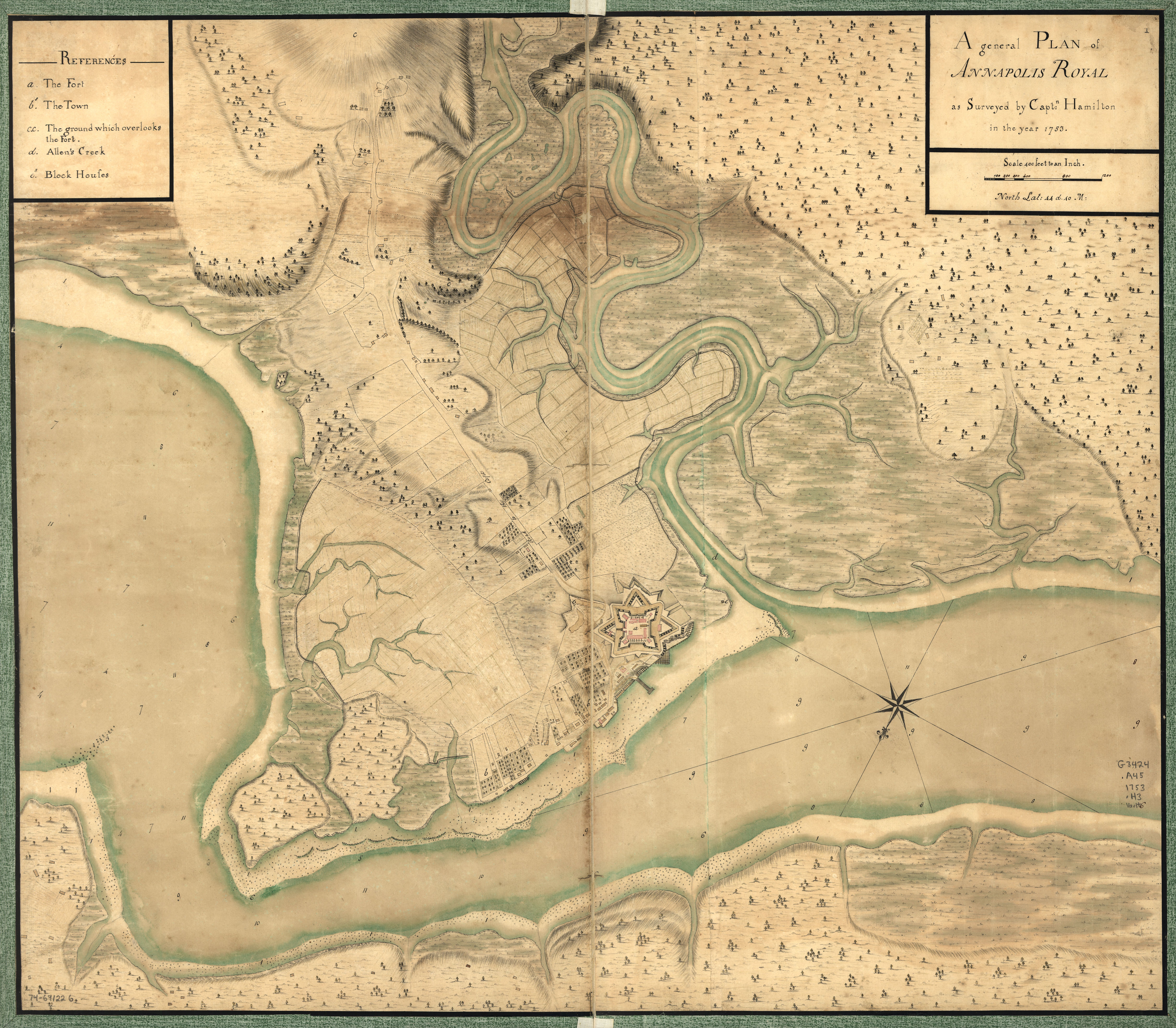
Annapolis Royal in 1753

The historic district is divided into five sub-districts.

Sub-District	Description
First	Characterised by large residences and land due to the prosperity of merchant ship owners. These houses were built in the late 19th and early 20th centuries and were built in different architectural styles such as Neo-Gothic, Neoclassical, Queen Anne Revival, Colonial, Italianate and English classicism styles. Notable buildings include: Hillsdale House (1859); Queen Anne Inn (1869)
Second	A transition zone between residential and commercial districts and is distinguished by smaller houses. It also contains the oldest buildings and monuments in the town. Notable buildings and monuments include: Annapolis County Court House (1837); Charles Fort (plaque indicating location in 1629); de Gannes-Cosby House (1708); Fort Anne (1708 & 1797); Garrison Cemetery (1720); Saint Luke's Anglican Church (Annapolis Royal) (1815)
Third	Includes the commercial district with its architecture harmonised by the use of similar materials. This sub-district includes the Sinclair Inn, which is the only Acadian structure remaining before the Expulsion. Notable buildings: Adams-Ritchie House (1713); Sinclair Inn (1708)
Fourth	Includes the lowest part of St. George Street. It included commercial and industrial enterprises that used the Annapolis River. It also includes the residences of the most eminent town residents. The sub-district is noted for its concentration of Palladian-style houses and the vernacular architecture of the Maritimes of the 18th and 19thcenturies. Notable buildings include: Bailey House (Annapolis Royal) (1770); Bonnett House (1773); O'Dell House (1869)
Fifth	Includes the residential area located inside the "L" of St. George Street. It includes smaller houses inhabited by craftsmen, traders and small business owners. Notable buildings include: Williams House (Annapolis Royal) (1715)
