= Melanson Settlement National Historic Site =

Historic site in Canada

Melanson Settlement National Historic Site of Canada
- Lieu historique national de l'Établissement-Melanson (French)
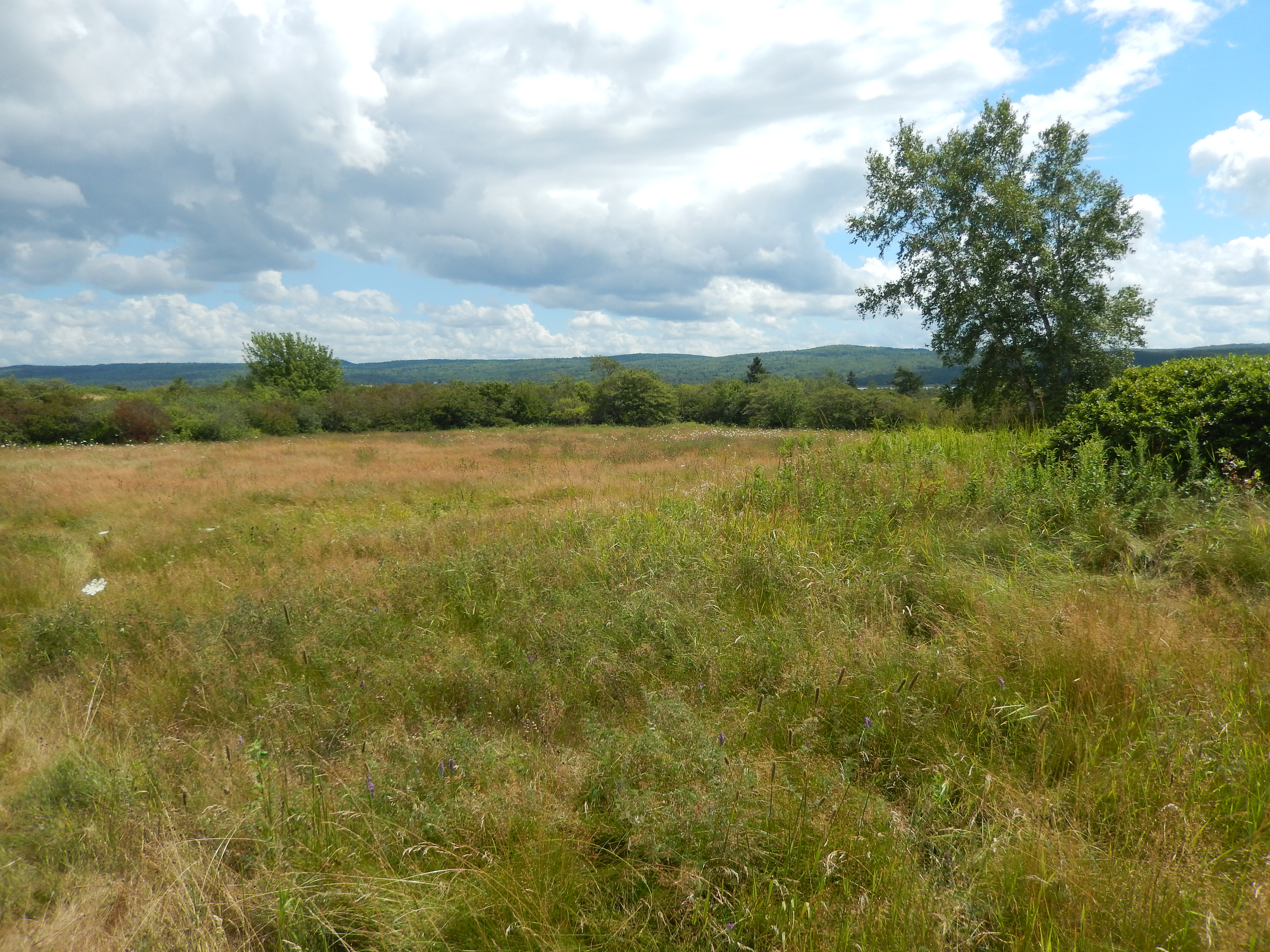
- Melanson Settlement National Historic Site of Canada

- Location within Nova Scotia
- 44.7195°N 65.5960°W

History
- Built: 1605–1755

Site notes
- Governing body: Parks Canada

National Historic Site of Canada
- Official name: Melanson Settlement National Historic Site of Canada
- Designated: 1987-03-30

Melanson Settlement National Historic Site (originally settled 1605–1755) is a National Historic Site located on the north bank of the Annapolis Basin. This open archeological site with walking paths is the location of a former Acadian settlement prior to deportation.

== History ==
The Melanson Settlement showcases an Acadian community of the 17th and 18th century. The Acadians settled along the Annapolis River used a method of dykes and cultivation that was unique in North America.

The settlement was established by Charles Melanson and Marie Dugas following their marriage in 1664 and occupied by four generations before the 1755 Acadian deportation.

== See also ==
- Port-Royal National Historic Site
- History of Nova Scotia
- History of Acadia
- List of National Historic Sites of Canada
- List of National Historic Sites of Canada in Nova Scotia
