= Saint Luke's Anglican Church (Annapolis Royal) =

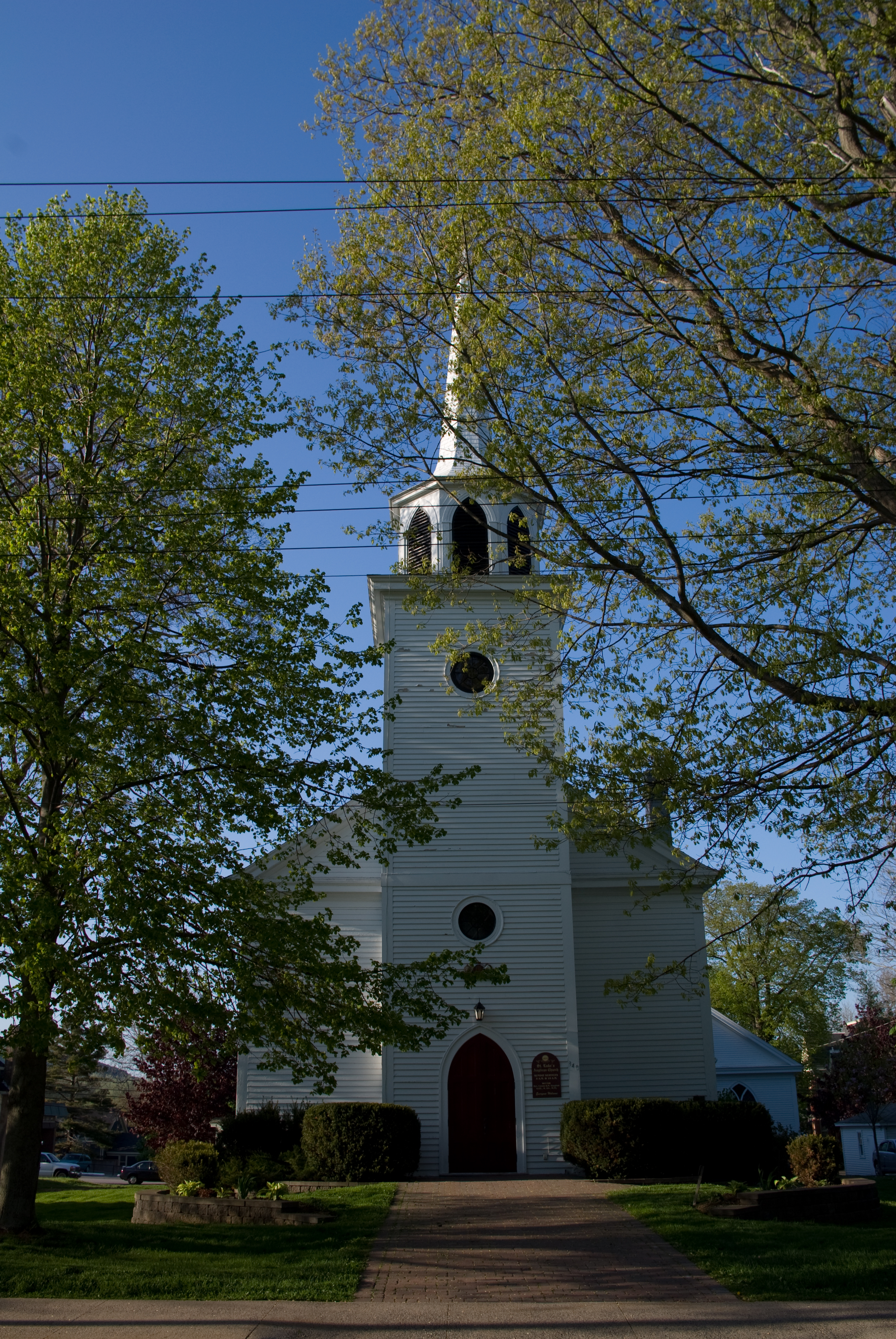

- Location within Nova Scotia
- Alternative names: The Old Garrison Church

General information
- Architectural style: Gothic Revival
- Location: 340 Saint George Street, Annapolis Royal, Canada
- Coordinates: 44.74282°N 65.51726°W
- Year built: 1815

Design and construction
- Designations

Nova Scotia Heritage Property Act

Website
- https://www.stlukesannapolisroyal.com

Saint Luke's Anglican Church is a historic church located in Annapolis Royal, Nova Scotia, Canada. Constructed in 1815, the church served the British garrison stationed at Fort Anne until the garrison's removal to Halifax in 1854. The building is part of the Historic District of Annapolis Royal.

== History ==
The first Saint Luke's Church in Annapolis Royal was erected in 1775 at the corner of Saint George and Church Street. It soon deteriorated and a new church was erected in 1815 at the current location. When the British garrison left in Fort Anne in 1854, the church interior was renovated, as it no longer needed to accommodate garrison soldiers. The church structure was further revised around 1874 and has remained relatively unchanged since then.

As a Royal Foundation, the church has the right to display the royal coat of arms above the entrance. The Foundation status is due the original land grant from George III in 1814. The church has received numerous items of royal patronage since its inception, although some, including the Queen Anne silver communion service, were removed to Halifax when the garrison left.

== See also ==
- Annapolis Royal (Town)
- Historic District of Annapolis Royal
- Anglican Church of Canada
