= Annapolis Royal =

Town and county seat in Nova Scotia, Canada

Annapolis Royal Port-Royal (French)
- Town and county seat
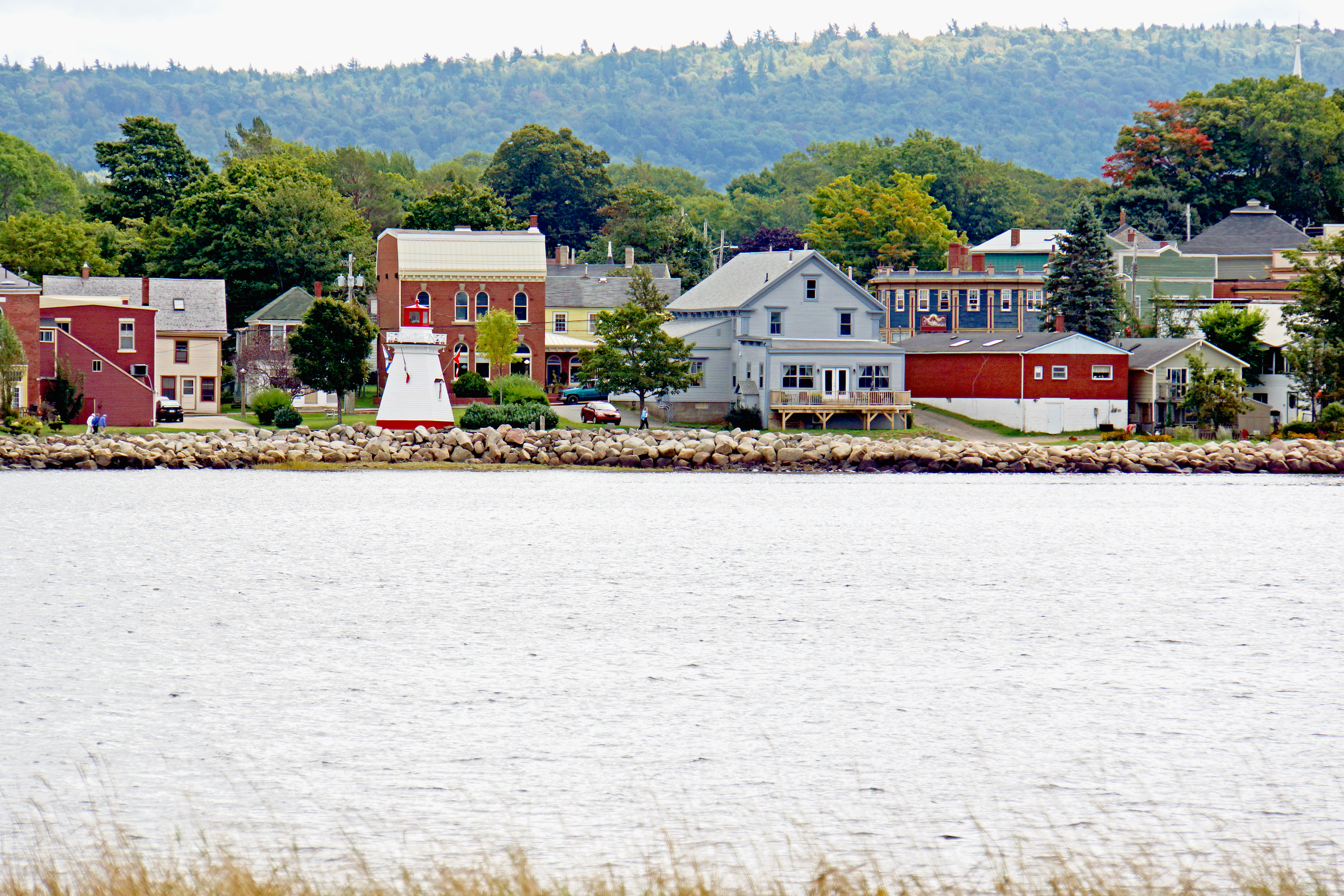
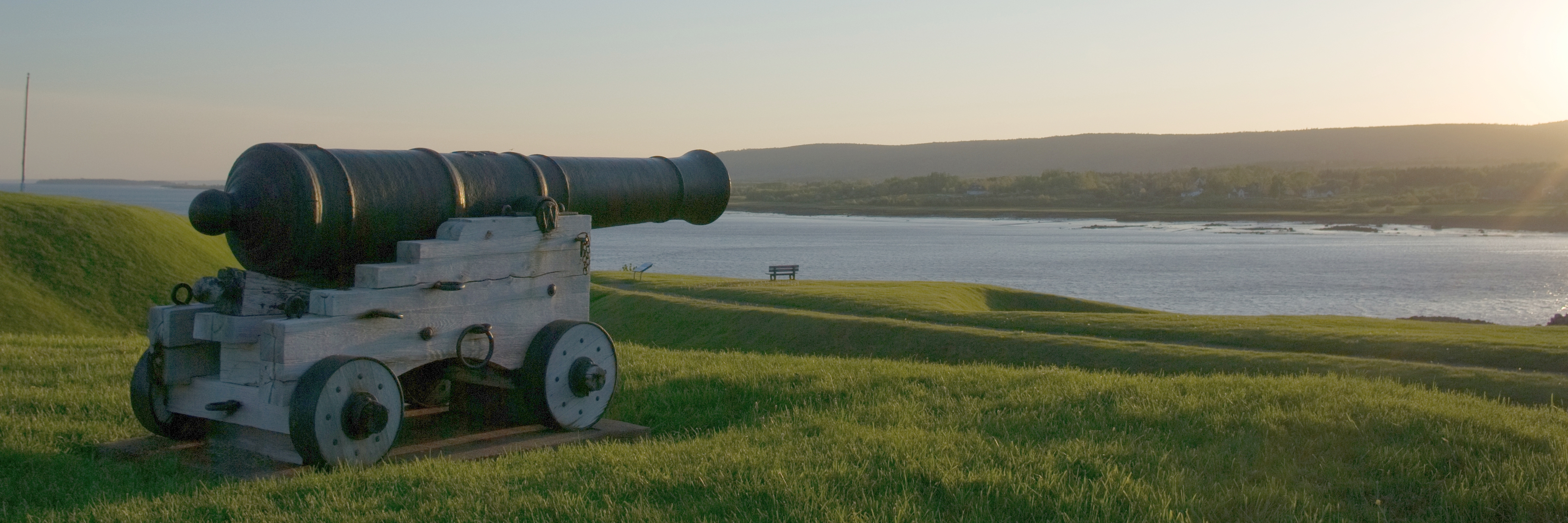
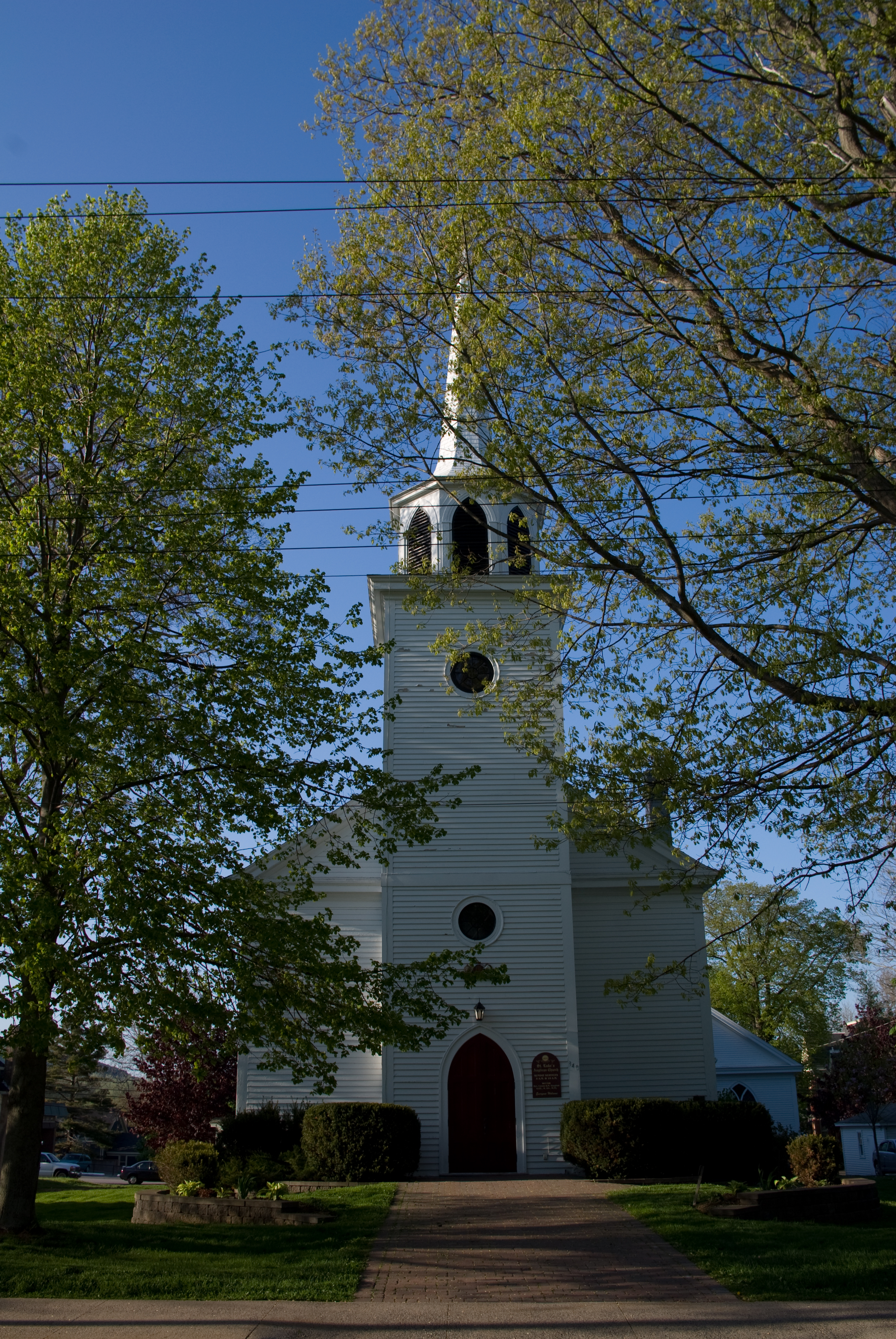
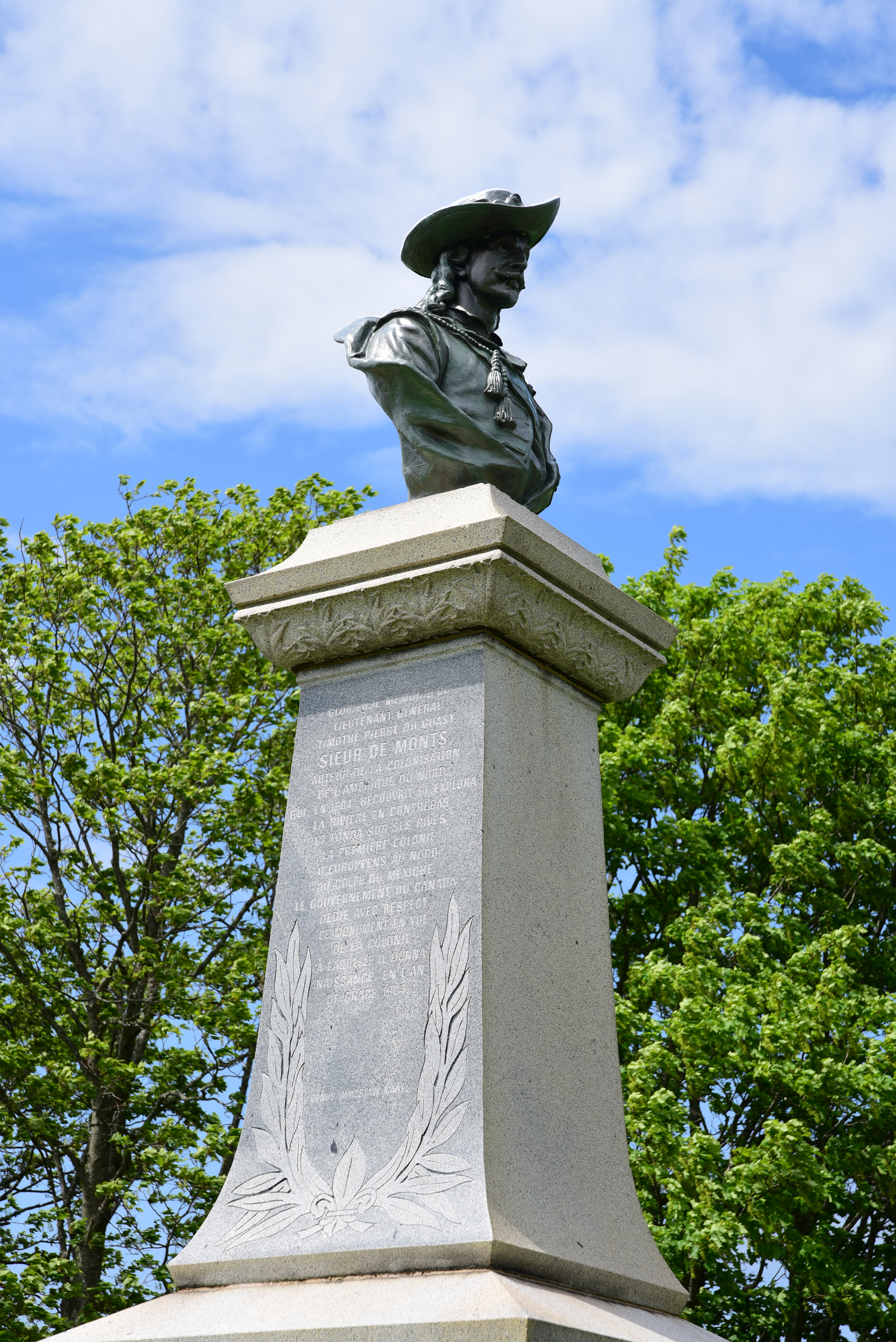
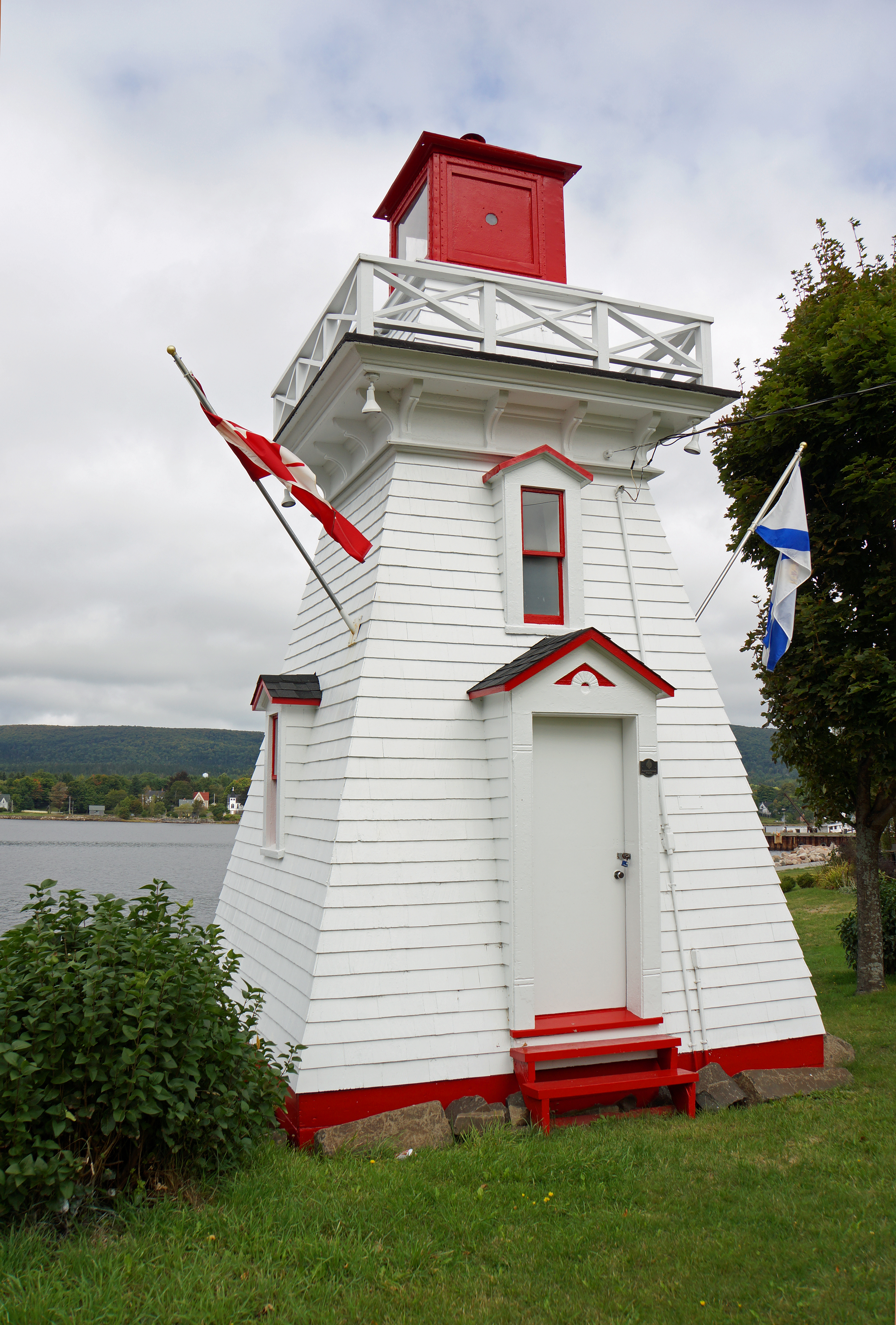
- Waterfront of Annapolis Royal View from Fort Anne looking south over Annapolis Basin Saint Luke's Church Pierre Dugua Monument Lighthouse Lobster fishing in Annapolis Royal harbour

- Flag
- Nickname: Cradle of the Nation
- Location of Annapolis Royal, Nova Scotia
- Coordinates: 44°44′30″N 65°30′55″W
- Country: Canada
- Province: Nova Scotia
- Municipality: Annapolis County
- Founded: 1605; 421 years ago as Port Royal
- Incorporated: 1892; 134 years ago
- Named for: Anne, Queen of Great Britain
- Electoral Districts Federal: West Nova
- Provincial: Annapolis

Government
  - Mayor: Amery Boyer
  - Governing Body: Annapolis Royal Town Council
  - MLA: David Bowlby (C)
  - MP: Chris d'Entremont (L)

Area (2021)
  - Total: 1.98 km^{2} (0.76 sq mi)
- Highest elevation: 7 m (23 ft)
- Lowest elevation: 0 m (0 ft)

Population (2021)
  - Total: 530
  - Density: 268.3/km^{2} (695/sq mi)
- Demonym: Annapolitan
- Time zone: UTC-4 (AST)
  - Summer (DST): UTC-3 (Atlantic Daylight Saving Time)
- Postal code: B0S1A0
- Area code: 902
- Telephone Exchange: 526, 532

National Historic Site of Canada
- Official name: Annapolis Royal Historic District National Historic Site of Canada
- Designated: 1994
- Website: annapolisroyal.com

Annapolis Royal is a town in and the county seat of Annapolis County, Nova Scotia, Canada. Originally established by the French as Port Royal in 1605, the community is historically significant as one of the oldest European settlements in North America. Its founding predates the English settlement at Jamestown (1607), the French settlement at Quebec City (1608), and the Pilgrims' arrival at Plymouth (1620).

Renamed as Annapolis Royal in honour of Queen Anne following the Siege of Port Royal in 1710, the town served as capital of Acadia and subsequently Nova Scotia, until the capital was transferred to Halifax in 1749.

While the original 1605 French settlement was centred at the nearby Habitation, the modern town developed around the site of Charles Fort, established by Scottish settlers in 1629. Situated on the boundary between rival French and British colonial empires, the strategic settlement changed hands seven times and withstood thirteen military sieges—more than any other location in North America.

In 1994, the town's core was designated the Annapolis Royal Historic District National Historic Site of Canada. This district anchors a significant heritage landscape that includes Canada's oldest National Historic Site, Fort Anne, six provincially recognized heritage properties, and over 135 municipal heritage properties. The town is also situated within the Southwest Nova Biosphere Reserve, a UNESCO-designated region.

Historically driven by military command and shipping, the town’s economy has since transitioned to a focus on tourism, heritage preservation, and the service sector.

== Toponymy ==
"Port Royal" originally referred to the Annapolis Basin and was named by French cartographer Samuel de Champlain in 1604. The French settlement on the Annapolis Basin was named "Annapolis Royal" in honour of Queen Anne following the siege of Port Royal in 1710 by Great Britain.

== History ==
=== Early history: before the Europeans ===
The location of the present town was named Nme'juaqnek meaning "the place of bountiful fish" by the Mi'kmaq. The area served as a strategic hub for seasonal migration and governance, functioning for generations as a primary gathering place for Chiefs and leaders. The flat, elevated escarpment at the confluence of the Annapolis and Allain rivers provided an ideal campsite for travellers navigating the canoe routes connecting the Bay of Fundy to Nova Scotia's South Shore via the interior waterways of Kejimkujik.

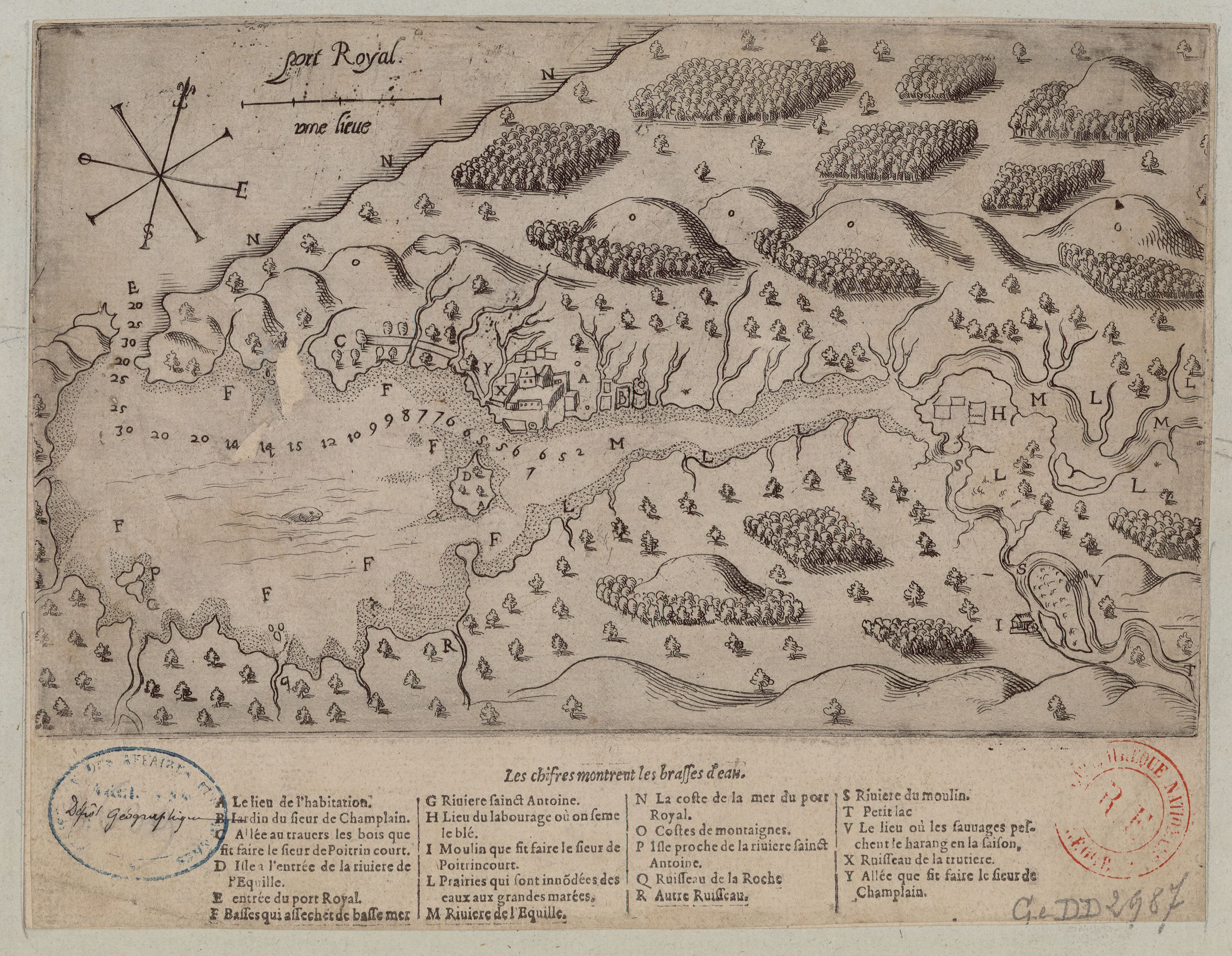
Map by Champlain (1609)

=== Port Royal: founding of Canada's oldest permanent settlement ===
The original French settlement of Port Royal was centred on the habitation and was founded in 1605 by Pierre Dugua, François Gravé Du Pont and Samuel de Champlain. The habitation was 10 km (6.2 mi) west of present-day Annapolis Royal and was abandoned after being destroyed by attackers from Virginia in 1613. The Port Royal settlement, which included the habitation, mill and surrounding agricultural land, comprised the first year-round European settlement in Canada. It was also likely the site of the introduction of apples to Canada in 1606.

In August 1629, Scottish settlers, under the auspices of Sir William Alexander, established a settlement known as Charles Fort, at the site of present-day Fort Anne. Charles Fort was established under the Royal Charter of Nova Scotia, granted by King James I to Alexander in 1621 and was the only Scottish settlement of any permanence in Nova Scotia granted under the charter.

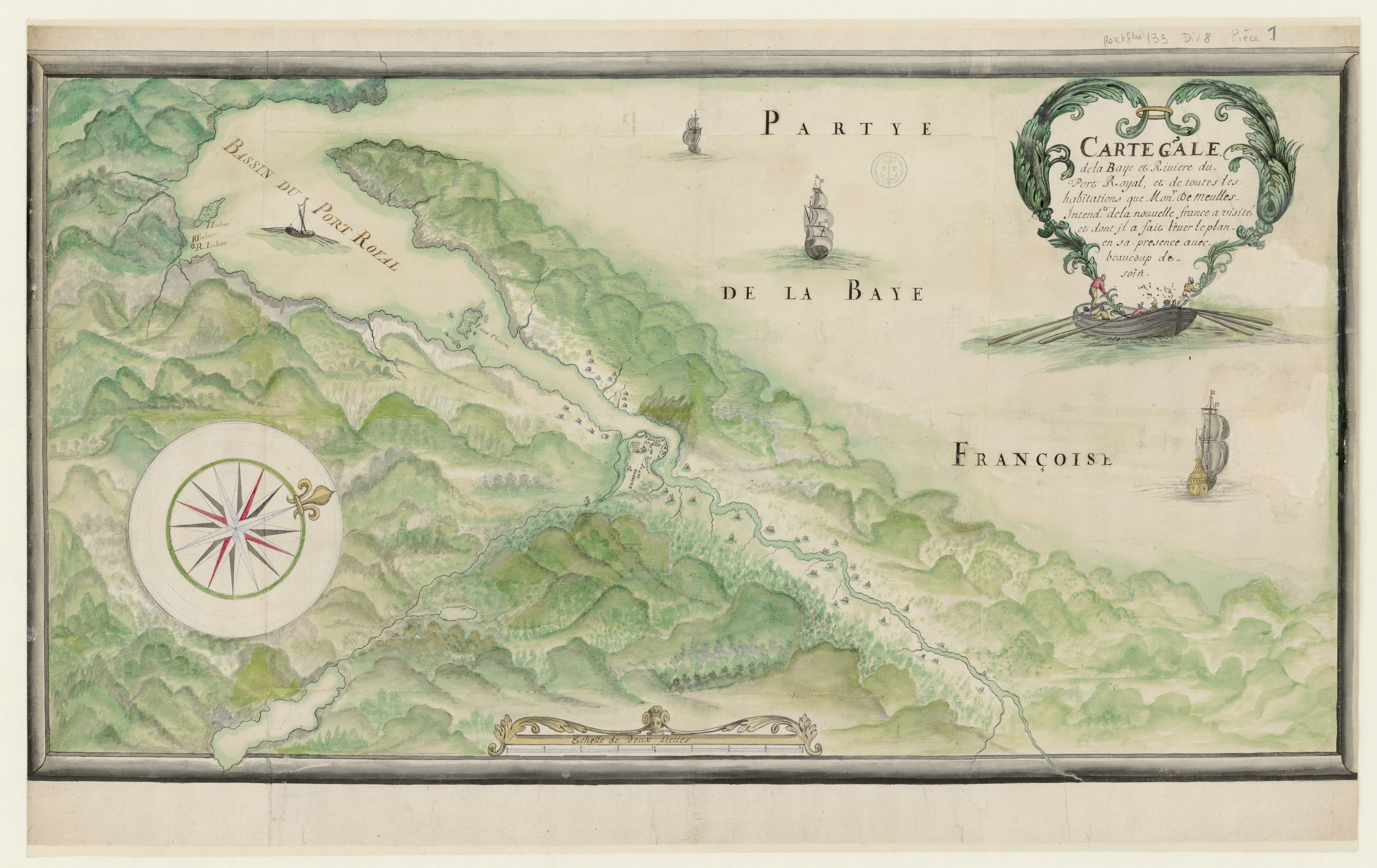
Map for Jacques de Meulles, Intendant of New France (1686)

The French had been actively farming the land that Charles Fort occupied from as early as 1606, but it was in 1629 that the Scottish made the Fort and the adjacent lands the centre of their activity. The nascent Scottish settlement was transferred to the French under the terms of the Treaty of Saint-Germain-en-Laye in 1632 and 47 Scottish settlers, including men, women and children were removed, although some settlers remained.

After 1632, Charles Fort, known again by its French name, Port Royal, soon became self-sufficient under the French and grew modestly for nearly a century. It was subject to frequent attacks and capture by English military forces or those of its New England colonists, only to be restored each time to French control by subsequent recapture or treaty stipulations. By 1671, the population grew to around 400. Port Royal and Acadia remained in French hands throughout most of the 17th century.

The basis of land settlement by the French was through the Seigneury of Port Royal, which was granted to Jean de Biencourt de Poutrincourt in 1604. This semi-feudal status of Port Royal, and later Annapolis Royal, remained in effect until 1733.

=== British conquest and renaming: the new capital of Nova Scotia ===
In 1710, Port Royal was captured a final time from the French at the siege of Port Royal during Queen Anne's War, marking the British conquest of peninsular Nova Scotia. The British named the town Annapolis Royal after Queen Anne (1665–1714), the reigning monarch.

In 1711, despite a successful skirmish at Bloody Creek (near modern-day Bridgetown, Nova Scotia), a combined force of Acadians and Indigenous warriors led by Bernard-Anselme d'Abbadie de Saint-Castin failed to recapture Annapolis Royal and Fort Anne during a siege because they lacked artillery.

Under the 1713 Treaty of Utrecht, Acadia was formally granted to Great Britain; however, the vague boundary definitions saw only the peninsular part of Nova Scotia granted to Great Britain. The next half-century would see great turbulence as Britain and France vied for dominance.

From 1710 to 1749, the Governor of Nova Scotia was based at Annapolis Royal. In 1720, the Nova Scotia Council, the forerunner of the Nova Scotia House of Assembly, was formed at Annapolis Royal by Governor Richard Phillips. The Governor and Council would continue to govern from Annapolis Royal until the founding of Halifax in 1749.

=== Dummer's War: the struggle to hold the capital ===
In July 1722, during the Drummer's War, Abenaki and Mi'kmaq forces attempted a blockade of Annapolis Royal in an attempt to starve the capital, which was countered by Lieutenant Governor John Doucett taking Mi'kmaq hostages. A key event of the war was the raid on Annapolis Royal in July 1724, where Mi'kmaq and Maliseets killed soldiers, burned houses, and took prisoners, prompting the British to retaliate by executing a Mi'kmaq hostage and burning three Acadian houses. Consequently, the town built blockhouses and moved the Acadian church nearer to the fort for better security.

=== King George's War: the final attempts by France to re-take the capital ===
During King George's War (1740–1748), French forces, Acadians, and Mi'kmaq launched four attempts to retake Annapolis Royal.

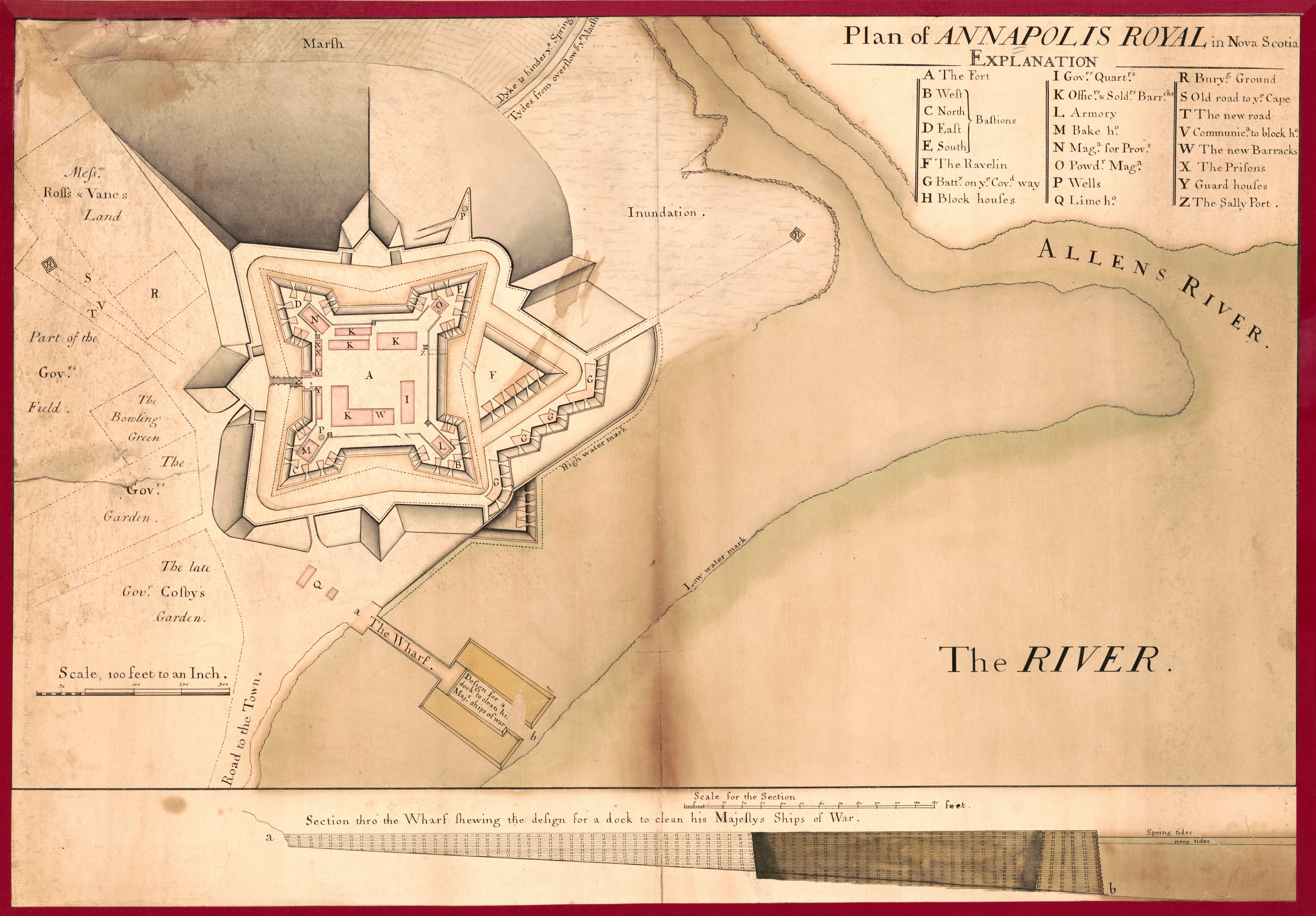
Plan of the fort at Annapolis Royal (c. 1744)

The first attempt was the Siege of Annapolis Royal in July 1744, when Jean-Louis Le Loutre led 300 Mi'kmaq warriors, outnumbering the New England regulars three-to-one. After four days, the assault failed when the fort received reinforcements from New England.

The second siege occurred in September 1744, when French officer François Dupont Duvivier gathered 200 men to attack the fort. The week-long siege ended when a New England ship carrying Ranger John Gorham and Indigenous allies arrived from Boston, forcing Duvivier to retreat.

In May 1745, Paul Marin de la Malgue led a large French force, allied with hundreds of Mi'kmaq, in a third siege, during which the English destroyed nearby buildings to deny the attackers cover. This siege was abandoned when Marin was recalled to aid in the defense of Louisbourg.

The final attempt, the 1746 siege, was led by Ramezay, whose French land forces waited twenty-three days for naval support from the ill-fated Duc d'Anville Expedition. As no naval aid arrived, Ramezay was forced to retreat.

=== Seven Years' War: deportation of the Acadians ===
The main effect of the Seven Years' War (1756–1763) on Annapolis Royal was the expulsion of the Acadian population. In December 1755, from the wharf at Fort Anne, 251 men, 263 women and 1,150 children were loaded onto seven ships to be forcibly removed from the land they had lived in for six generations. They were to be taken to Massachusetts, Connecticut, New York and North Carolina. The deportations, which had started at the Minas Basin about seven weeks earlier, had finally descended into the historic Acadian heartland.

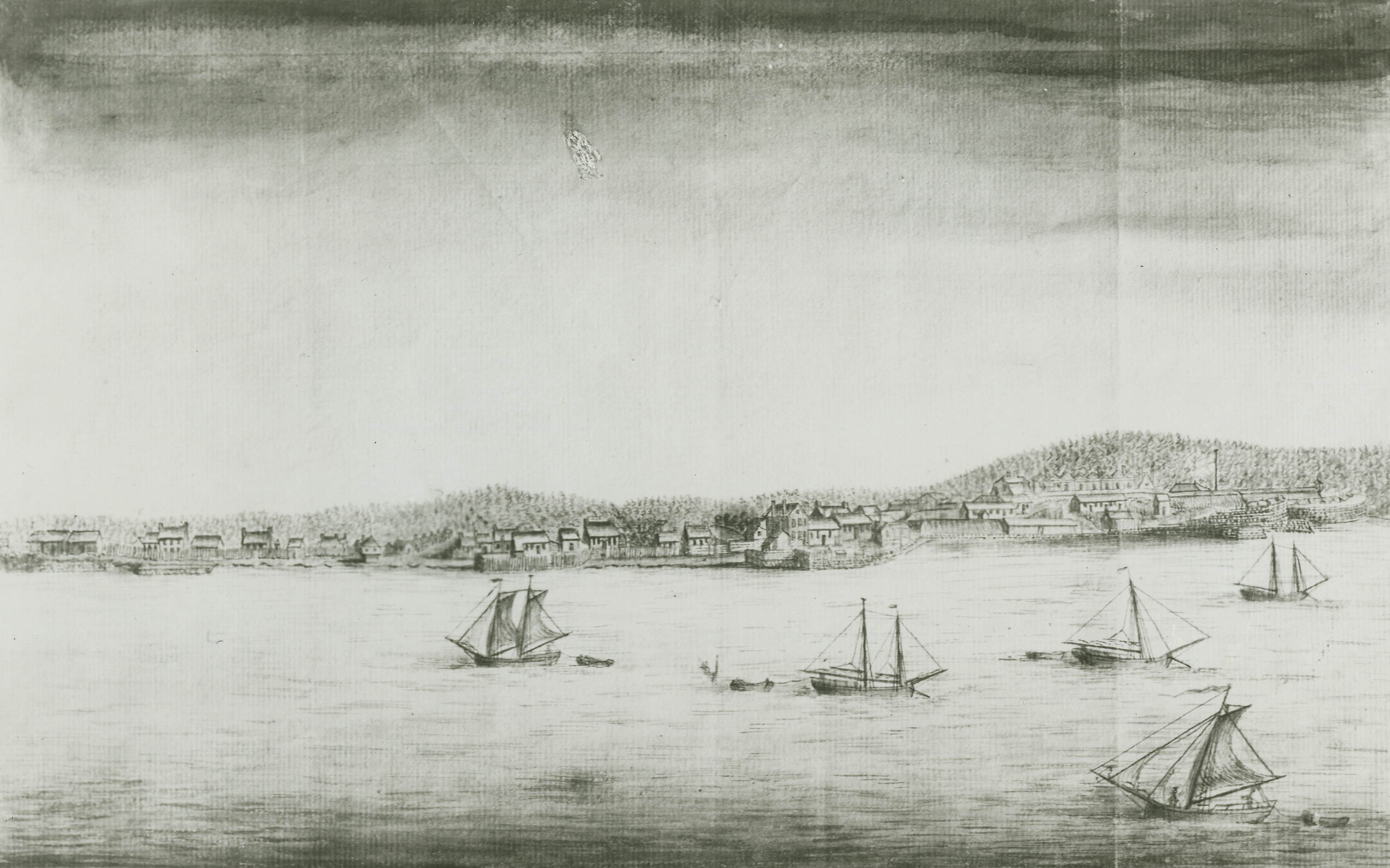
Annapolis Royal by John Hamilton (c. 1753)

By one account, 48 Acadian families fled the Annapolis Royal area while the rest waited to be deported. The general British plan was forced assimilation of the Acadians by separating the families throughout the American colonies. In one exception, the Le Blanc family of Annapolis Royal, sent to Massachusetts, was permitted to stay together.

In a daring and successful attempt at escape, the Acadians aboard the ship "Pembroke" overpowered the crew and sailed the ship to the Saint John River where 232 passengers escaped. It was not until 1764 that Acadians were legally allowed to live again in the Annapolis Royal area, and then, only with restricted liberties - very few returned.

In 1759, Governor Lawrence invited planters from New England to come to Nova Scotia and settle the empty farms. From 1759 to 1768, 8,000 New Englanders moved into the Annapolis Valley of Nova Scotia and Saint John River Valley of New Brunswick.

=== American Revolutionary War: arrival of the Loyalists ===
Although invited to take part in the revolution by the Continental Congress, Nova Scotia remained largely loyal to Great Britain.

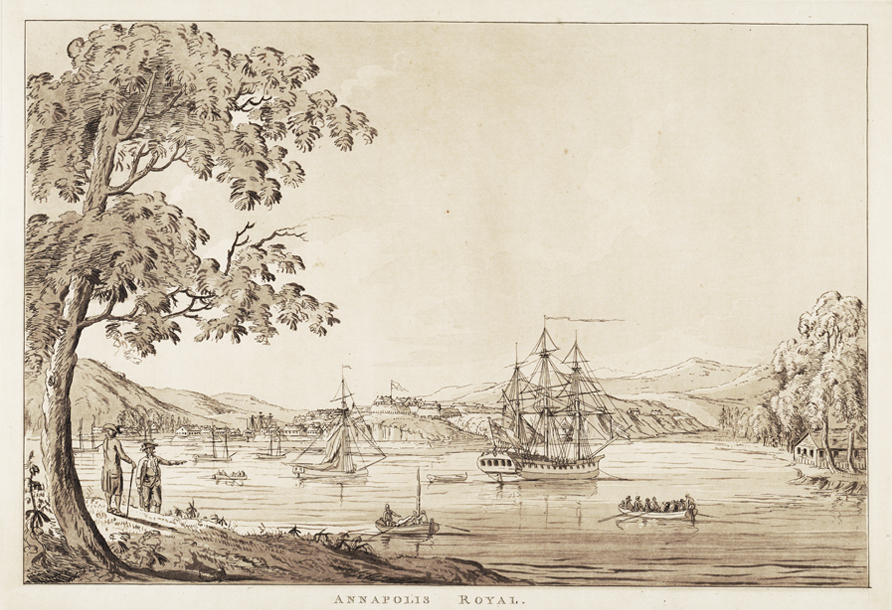
Annapolis Royal (c. 1781)

During the American Revolutionary War (1775–1783), the 84th Regiment of Foot (Royal Highland Emigrants) were stationed at Annapolis Royal to guard Nova Scotia against American Privateers. On October 2, 1778, the 84th Regiment was involved in the defeat of an American privateer at Annapolis Royal. Captain MacDonald sailed into the town only to find a large privateer ship raiding the port, which he destroyed.

On August 29, 1781, two large American privateer schooners attacked the undefended town. They imprisoned the men of the community in the fort and systematically looted houses in the town, even stealing window-glass from the church. The privateers fled when reports arrived that the militia was assembling outside the town. The only death took place when the privateers accidentally shot their own pilot. Two town residents were taken as hostages and later released on parole on promise of exchange for an American prisoner at Halifax.

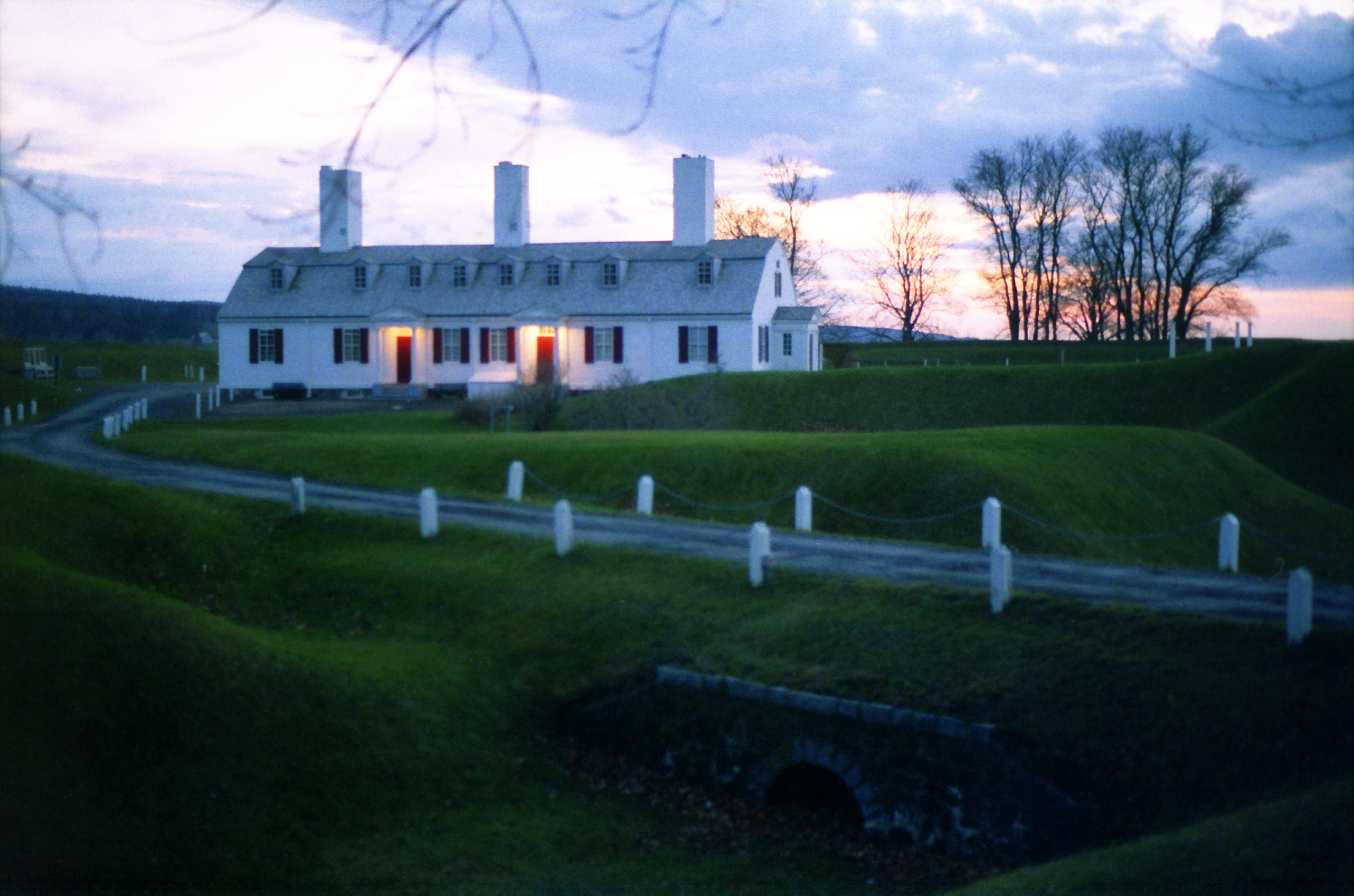
Officer's Quarters (1798) at Fort Anne

After the American Revolution, more than 30,000 United Empire Loyalists migrated to the maritimes, many of them arriving in Annapolis Royal, severely taxing the resources of the town. Many later moved to found settlements such as Digby and Clementsport.

Some Loyalists, such as Anglican minister Jacob Bailey, remained in Annapolis Royal and became members of the town's elite. Many escaped slaves who fought for the British known as Black Loyalists were also part of the migration, including Thomas Peters, a member of the Black Pioneers regiment and an important Black Loyalist leader who later took land near Digby. Another notable Black Loyalist, Rose Fortune, founded a freight business and policed the Annapolis Royal waterfront. The Loyalists remaining in Annapolis Royal brought an injection of professions and capital that strengthened the town as a regional centre beyond its status as a military outpost.

=== 19th century: decline of military importance and economic shift ===
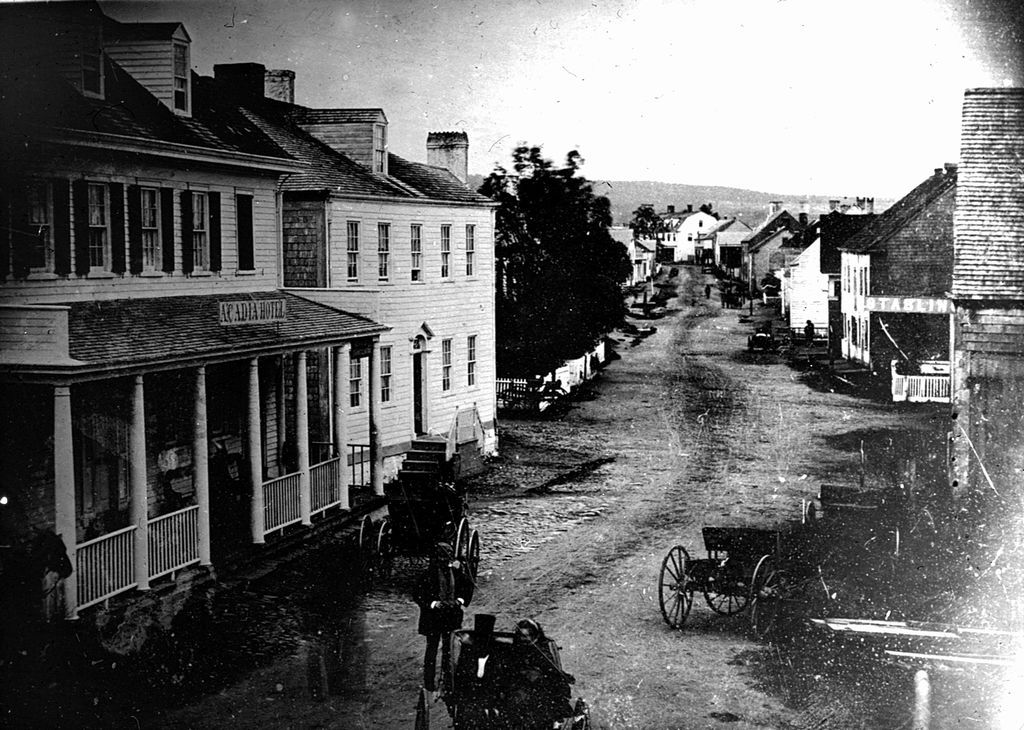
Annapolis Royal, circa 1851-1871

Owing to the extreme tidal range, relatively shallow waters of the Annapolis Basin, and the small population of its hinterland, the port of Annapolis Royal, despite having a good harbour, carried on only a small trade through the 19th century. Along with Granville Ferry across the river, however, it was a local centre for shipbuilding. Among the notable local mariners was Bessie Hall. Following the replacement of sailing ships by steam in the 1880s, Annapolis Royal served as a coaling station between Saint John and Boston.

The fort, to which the town largely owed its existence in the first place, ceased to be an active military post in 1854. In that year, the British Garrison departed and moved to the new citadel in Halifax.

The town had a minor boom in 1869 when the Windsor and Annapolis Railway arrived, with two large railway piers built along the waterfront and several factories constructed in the area. The population reached 1,500 in the 1870s. Incorporation as a town under the Nova Scotia Municipalities Act took place in 1893. However, the completion of the railway to Digby in 1893, followed by the creation of the Dominion Atlantic Railway to Yarmouth, shifted most of the steamship commerce to those cities as steel-hulled vessels began to require deeper and deeper waters. By 1901, Annapolis Royal's population had shrunk to 1,019 and it became a small country town whose principal export was apples.

=== 20th century and beyond ===
A ferry service ran from Lower Saint George Street across the river to Granville Ferry from the early 19th century, but a bridge was built in 1921 to link the two sides of the estuary. This bridge collapsed in 1961 and was replaced by a causeway, already under construction.

The Annapolis Royal Generating Station, near Annapolis Royal on the Annapolis River, was North America's only tidal power station, producing up to 20 MW twice daily using the Annapolis Basin's tides. It operated from 1984 until 2019.

In 1984, Annapolis Royal elected the first female black mayor in Canada, Daurene Lewis.

== Demographics ==
Historical population
Year	Pop.	±%
1971	758	—
1976	738	−2.6%
1981	631	−14.5%
1986	631	+0.0%
1991	633	+0.3%
1996	583	−7.9%
2001	550	−5.7%
2006	444	−19.3%
2011	481	+8.3%
2016	491	+2.1%
2021	530	+7.9%

In the 2021 Census of Population conducted by Statistics Canada, Annapolis Royal had a population of 530 living in 322 of its 364 total private dwellings, a change of 7.9% from its 2016 population of 491. With a land area of 1.98 km^{2} (0.76 sq mi), it had a population density of 267.7/km^{2} (693.3/sq mi) in 2021.

== Geography ==
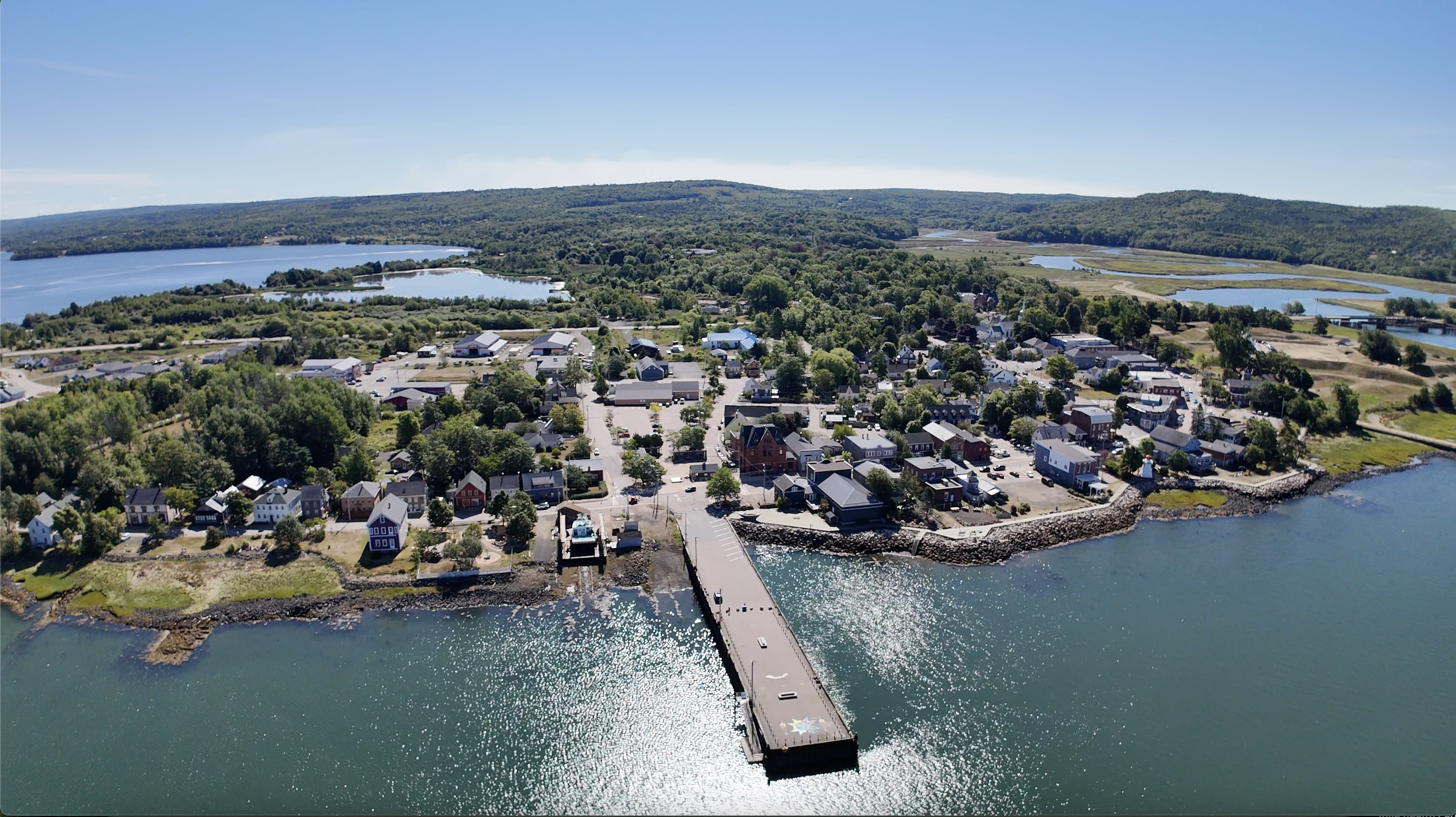
Annapolis Royal, Nova Scotia, situated on a peninsula jutting into the Annapolis Basin, an inlet of the Bay of Fundy.

Annapolis Royal is situated in a good but shallow harbour at the western end of the fertile Annapolis Valley, nestled between the North and South mountains which define the valley. The town is on the south bank of the Annapolis River facing the heavily tidal Annapolis Basin. The riverside forms the waterfront for this historic town. Directly opposite Annapolis Royal on the northern bank of the river is the community of Granville Ferry. Allains Creek joins the Annapolis River at the town, defining the western side of the community. The Bay of Fundy, on the other side of the North Mountain, is 10 kilometres north of the town.

The Annapolis Basin, Annapolis River, Annapolis County, and the Annapolis Valley all take their name from the town.

=== Climate ===
Annapolis Royal has a humid continental climate (Köppen Dfb) and typically has mild summers, cold winters and is wet all year.

Climate data for Annapolis Royal (1981–2010)
Month	Jan	Feb	Mar	Apr	May	Jun	Jul	Aug	Sep	Oct	Nov	Dec	Year
Record high °C (°F)	18.5 (65.3)	17.5 (63.5)	21.7 (71.1)	26.0 (78.8)	30.0 (86.0)	34.0 (93.2)	32.2 (90.0)	32.8 (91.0)	30.0 (86.0)	25.6 (78.1)	22.2 (72.0)	19.4 (66.9)	34.0 (93.2)
Mean daily maximum °C (°F)	−0.7 (30.7)	0.1 (32.2)	3.4 (38.1)	9.0 (48.2)	15.8 (60.4)	20.4 (68.7)	23.3 (73.9)	23.3 (73.9)	19.0 (66.2)	13.2 (55.8)	8.0 (46.4)	2.1 (35.8)	11.4 (52.5)
Daily mean °C (°F)	−4.3 (24.3)	−3.8 (25.2)	−0.3 (31.5)	5.1 (41.2)	11.1 (52.0)	15.5 (59.9)	18.5 (65.3)	18.6 (65.5)	14.9 (58.8)	9.6 (49.3)	4.9 (40.8)	−1.1 (30.0)	7.4 (45.3)
Mean daily minimum °C (°F)	−7.8 (18.0)	−7.6 (18.3)	−4.0 (24.8)	1.2 (34.2)	6.2 (43.2)	10.2 (50.4)	13.3 (55.9)	13.4 (56.1)	10.3 (50.5)	5.9 (42.6)	1.7 (35.1)	−4.1 (24.6)	3.2 (37.8)
Record low °C (°F)	−26.0 (−14.8)	−27.2 (−17.0)	−24.4 (−11.9)	−13.3 (8.1)	−6.1 (21.0)	−3.3 (26.1)	−1.1 (30.0)	0.0 (32.0)	−2.2 (28.0)	−8.3 (17.1)	−13.3 (8.1)	−23.9 (−11.0)	−27.2 (−17.0)
Average precipitation mm (inches)	114.4 (4.50)	85.2 (3.35)	94.3 (3.71)	94.7 (3.73)	86.4 (3.40)	74.4 (2.93)	68.7 (2.70)	68.5 (2.70)	110.3 (4.34)	120.4 (4.74)	125.3 (4.93)	112.5 (4.43)	1,155.2 (45.48)
Average rainfall mm (inches)	59.5 (2.34)	51.6 (2.03)	67.0 (2.64)	87.0 (3.43)	86.0 (3.39)	74.4 (2.93)	68.7 (2.70)	68.5 (2.70)	110.3 (4.34)	120.4 (4.74)	118.0 (4.65)	80.2 (3.16)	991.8 (39.05)
Average snowfall cm (inches)	54.9 (21.6)	33.5 (13.2)	27.3 (10.7)	7.7 (3.0)	0.4 (0.2)	0.0 (0.0)	0.0 (0.0)	0.0 (0.0)	0.0 (0.0)	0.0 (0.0)	7.3 (2.9)	31.2 (12.3)	162.4 (63.9)
Average precipitation days (≥ 0.2 mm)	13.7	10.9	11.3	11.3	11.0	11.1	8.6	8.3	10.2	11.2	13.2	12.9	133.5
Average rainy days (≥ 0.2 mm)	6.1	5.5	7.6	10.4	10.9	11.1	8.6	8.3	10.2	11.2	12.4	8.5	110.7
Average snowy days (≥ 0.2 cm)	9.2	6.4	5.0	1.7	0.05	0.0	0.0	0.0	0.0	0.0	1.4	5.2	28.9
Source: Environment Canada

== Economy ==
Historically driven by military command and shipping, the economy of Annapolis Royal has transitioned to a focus on tourism, heritage preservation, and the service sector. The town anchors the regional economy of the Annapolis Valley, which is characterized by agriculture, agri-tech, and manufacturing.

=== Tourism and Heritage ===
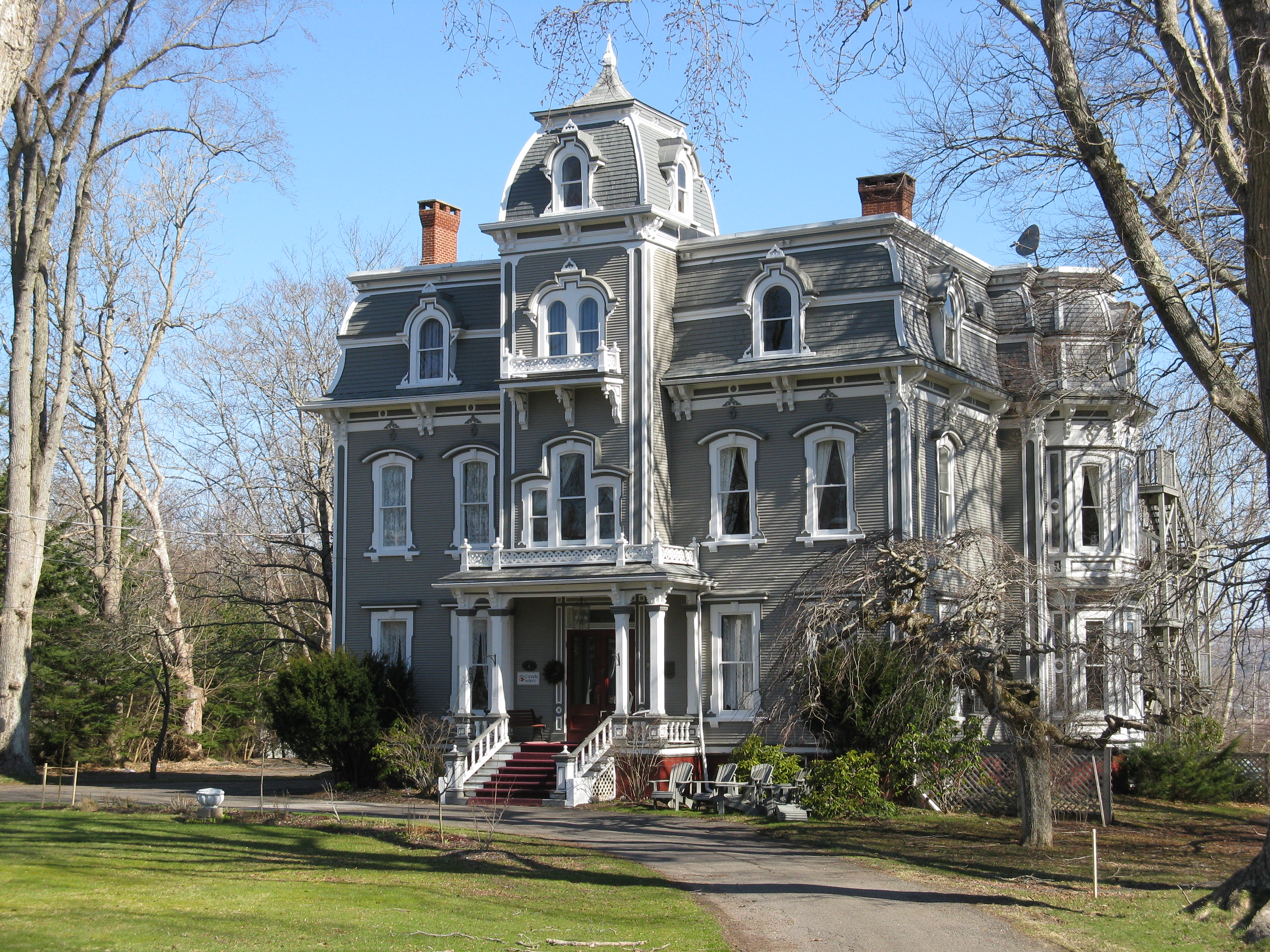
A heritage building, now a visitor accommodation

Tourism is a significant part of the economy of Annapolis Royal, and it is built upon the town’s concentration of nationally recognized heritage sites. Two of the main tourism anchors operated by Parks Canada, Fort Anne National Historic Site and the Port-Royal National Historic Site (Habitation), recorded visitor numbers of 35,283 and 17,844 respectively in the 2022-2023 fiscal year. These figures account only for ticketed admissions and exclude visitors to the grounds, which are open free to the public year-round.

The Annapolis Royal Historic Gardens, a 17-acre horticultural site, serves as another major economic anchor for the town. In 2023, the Gardens generated a total revenue of $537,892.

=== Local Commerce and Entrepreneurship ===
The town’s commercial activity is supported by retail, service providers, and local entrepreneurship. The Saturday Annapolis Royal Farmers and Traders Market is a major seasonal event, cited as Nova Scotia's largest outdoor market and the longest continuously operating farm market of any kind in the province, hosting over 100 vendors.

Local economic development has been supported by Annapolis Investments in Rural Opportunity (AIRO), a community-focused micro-lending organization. Between 2016 and 2021, AIRO directly invested $722,877 into local businesses and community projects, which facilitated the creation of over 183 full-time, part-time, and seasonal jobs. The town’s core commercial district contains two grocery stores and a variety of galleries, artisan shops, and a microbrewery.

== Historic sites and museums ==
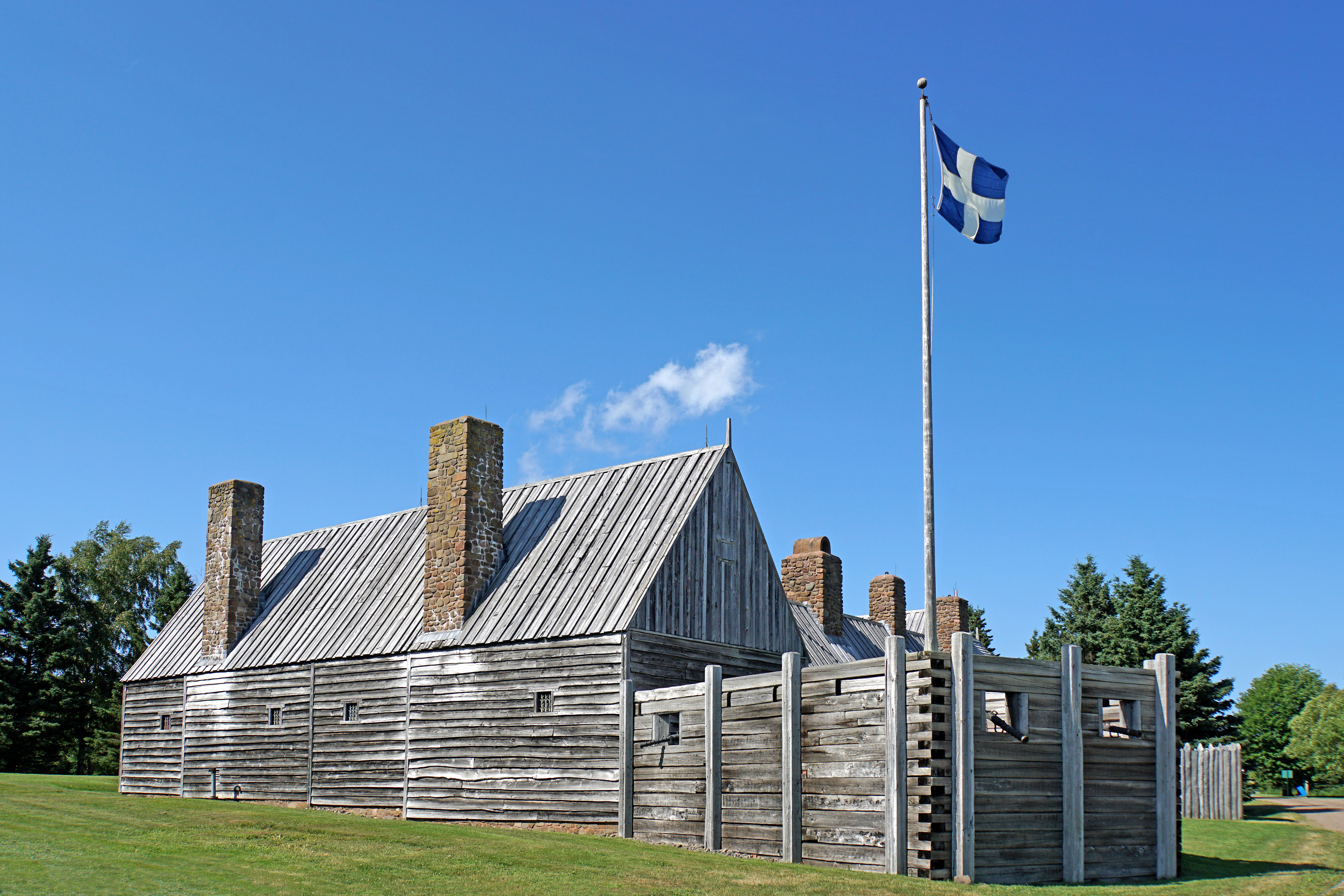
Reconstructed habitation at Port-Royal National Historic Site

Annapolis Royal is home to numerous historic sites, both within the town and in the surrounding area

- The Port-Royal National Historic Site is the location of the 1605 habitation and is also the location of a 20th-century reconstruction. It was the first National Historic Site to have a replica structure built.
- Fort Anne, which was also known as Charles Fort when first built in 1629, is Canada's oldest extant fort and its first National Historic Site. A seasonal museum operates on the site giving a history of the fort and the area. The fort grounds include the Garrison Cemetery, one of the oldest extant cemeteries in Canada and site of the former Acadian parish Church of Saint John the Baptist.
- Although Charles Fort no longer exists above ground, a commemorative plaque indicates the site of the 1629 Scottish fort.
- The Historic District of Annapolis Royal is Canada's largest historic district containing 135 heritage properties spanning the 18th, 19th and early 20th centuries.
- At 404 km^{2} (156 sq mi) in size, Kejimkujik National Park is also a National Historic Site. It is a core part of the UNESCO designated Southwest Nova Biosphere Reserve. It is also designated a dark-sky preserve by the International Dark Sky Association.
- The De Gannes-Cosby House National Historic Site dates from 1708 and is recognised as the oldest wood-framed building in Canada and the world's oldest building in the Acadian style. The house is a private residence and not open to the public.
- The Annapolis County Court House National Historic Site, built in 1837, is one of the oldest courthouses in Canada that is still in use.
- The Melanson Settlement, located on the north shore of the Annapolis Basin, is a former Acadian settlement prior to deportation. It is an open archeological site with walking paths.
- The Bloody Creek National Historic Site is the location of both the Battles of Bloody Creek in 1711 and 1757.
- The Sinclair Inn National Historic Site is an Acadian building and seasonal museum. The focus of the museum is on the unique architecture of the building.
- The O'Dell House Museum is a seasonal community museum. The house presents a collection of mainly 19th-century items related to the history of Annapolis Royal and the surrounding area.
- The North Hills Museum, located in Granville Ferry, is a seasonal museum and one of the oldest buildings in Canada. The museum presents a collection of furniture, ceramics, glasses, silverware and paintings.

== Arts and culture ==
The Annapolis Basin and Annapolis Royal are perhaps the location of some of the first theatrical productions in Canada with the Théâtre de Neptune, written by Marc Lescarbot (c. 1570–1641), performed in the harbour outside the Port Royal habitation on November 14, 1606. In 1743, Paul Mascarene, the Lieutenant Governor of Nova Scotia, translated Molière's La Misanthrope and staged productions that winter in Annapolis Royal.

Bowls was invented here in 1734 when a green was laid by the Garrison of Nova Scotia near the site of Fort Anne. There is currently no active lawn bowling club in the town.

ARTsPLACE is an art collective located here.

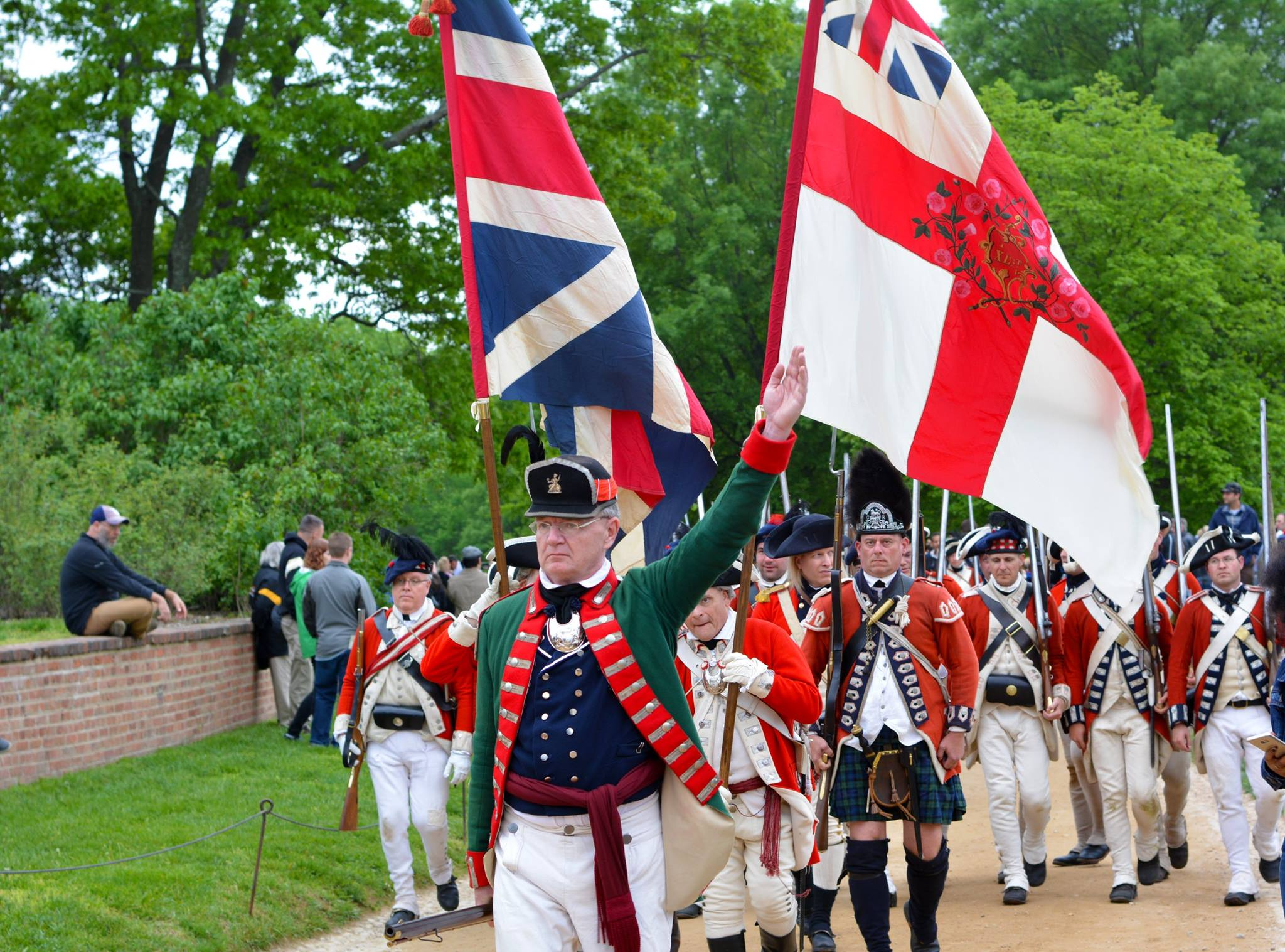
Reenactments play a large role in the annual Natal Day celebrations

The town has a long-time town crier, who works closely with the mayor and town council on public events. Annapolis Royal hosted the International Town Criers Competition in 2017.

The two principal venues for theatre and performance in the town are the historic King's Theatre and the recently constructed Oqwa'titek amphitheatre. These venues host live performances by both local and international groups.

Each year, Natal Day is celebrated over the weekend of the first Monday in August. Events are held throughout the town and Fort Anne, such as live music, dances, historical reenactments and pipe bands, culminating in a parade on the final day.

== Government and municipal services ==
Despite its historical role as the capital of Acadia (until 1720) and Nova Scotia (until 1749), Annapolis Royal was formally incorporated as a town in 1892.

The town government is administered by an elected Town Council, comprising a Mayor, Deputy Mayor, and three Councillors. Daily operations are managed by a Chief Administration Officer (CAO).

Annapolis Royal serves as the county seat for the County of Annapolis, but it operates as an independent municipal jurisdiction separate from the County government.

The town provides dedicated local services:

- Police: The town maintains its own municipal police department.
- Fire: Fire services are provided by the Annapolis Royal Volunteer Fire Department, established in 1811.

== Education ==
Annapolis Royal is within the Annapolis Valley Regional Centre for Education. Champlain Elementary School, in nearby Granville Ferry, services students from kindergarten to grade 5; while middle and high school students attend the Annapolis West Education Centre.

== Sister cities ==
Annapolis Royal has two sister cities:

- Royan, Nouvelle-Aquitaine, France
- Annapolis, Maryland, USA

== Notable people ==
- Chief Henri Membertou (1507–1611), National Historic Person and Grand Chief of the Mi'kmaq
- Charles de Menou d'Aulnay (1604–1650), National Historic Person and Governor of Acadia
- Samuel Vetch (1668–1732), National Historic Person and Royal Governor of Nova Scotia
- Noel Doiron (1684–1758), a notable Acadian leader
- Paul Mascarene (1684–1760), National Historic Person and Royal Governor of Nova Scotia
- Joseph Broussard (1702–1765), also known as "Beausoleil", a notable Acadian leader
- Erasmus James Philipps (1705–1760), member of the Nova Scotia Council
- John Bradstreet (1714–1774), British army officer
- Admiral Philipps Cosby (1729–1808), National Historic Person and Officer of Royal Navy
- Thomas Peters (1738–1792), founding father of Sierra Leone
- Admiral William Wolseley (1756 – 1842), National Historic Person and Officer of Royal Navy
- Sir William Winniett (1793–1850), abolitionist, Governor of the Gold Coast
- Sir Fenwick Williams (1800–1883), military leader and first Lieutenant Governor of Nova Scotia born in the province
- John William Ritchie (1808–1890), Father of Confederation
- Sir William Johnstone Ritchie (1813–1892), second Chief Justice of Canada
- Robert Knox Sneden (1832–1918), American civil war veteran, landscape painter and map-maker

== Eponym ==
Minor planet 516560 Annapolisroyal was named in honour of the town by David D. Balam. The official naming citation was published by the Minor Planet Center on 25 September 2018 (M.P.C. 111804).

== See also ==
- Annapolis Basin
- Annapolis County
- Annapolis River
- Fort Anne
- Historic District of Annapolis Royal
- Lordship of Port Royal
- Port Royal (Acadia)
- Royal eponyms in Canada
