= List of National Historic Sites of Canada in Nova Scotia =

This is a list of National Historic Sites (French: Lieux historiques nationaux) in the province of Nova Scotia. As of April 2021, there were 91 National Historic Sites designated in Nova Scotia, 26 of which are administered by Parks Canada (identified below by the beaver icon ).

Numerous National Historic Events also occurred across Nova Scotia, and are identified at places associated with them, using the same style of federal plaque which marks National Historic Sites. Several National Historic Persons are commemorated throughout the province in the same way. The markers do not indicate which designation—a Site, Event, or Person—a subject has been given.

This list uses names designated by the national Historic Sites and Monuments Board, which may differ from other names for these sites.

UNESCO World Heritage Site unit

== National Historic Sites ==
Site	Date(s)	Designated	Location	Description	Image
Acacia Grove / Prescott House	1809 (completed)	1969	Starr's Point; 45°6′38″N 64°22′44″W	A house on an extensive property in the Annapolis Valley, built for horticulturalist Charles Ramage Prescott; a noted example of Georgian architecture in Canada	View of Acacia Grove / Prescott House and gardens
Admiralty House	1819 (completed)	1978	Halifax; 44°39′34″N 63°35′34″W	An austere two-storey stone mansion set within the Stadacona site of CFB Halifax which served as the home of Commander-in-Chief of the Royal Navy’s North American station from 1819 until 1904	Front facade of Admiralty House
Africville	1964 (relocation commenced)	1996	Halifax; 44°40′28″N 63°37′7″W	A Black Nova Scotian community cleared by the municipality in the 1960s in the name of urban renewal; the community was representative of Black settlements in the province and became an enduring symbol of the need for vigilance in defense of Black communities and institutions	The Africville Monument in Seaview Park with the A Murray MacKay Bridge in the background
Akins House	1815 (c.) (completed)	1965	Halifax; 44°39′12″N 63°34′55″W	A one-and-a-half-storey wood-shingled house originally built for Thomas Beamish Akins, surviving virtually in its original condition; one of the few remaining early 19th-century houses in Halifax and one of the oldest houses in the city	
Alexander Graham Bell	1954 (museum completed)	1952	Baddeck; 46°6′10″N 60°44′45″W	A museum containing Alexander Graham Bell memorabilia, located on a 10-hectare (25-acre) property overlooking Bras d'Or Lake and Bell's summer estate at Beinn Bhreagh	Visitor Centre at the Alexander Graham Bell National Historic Site of Canada
Annapolis County Court House	1837 (completed)	1991	Annapolis Royal; 44°44′31″N 65°30′58″W	One of the oldest court houses in Canada still in original use, and a noted example of Palladian architecture in this country	Annapolis County Court House
Annapolis Royal Historic District	1605 (established)	1994	Annapolis Royal; 44°44′30″N 65°30′51″W	A historic core containing commercial, military, and residential buildings from the 18th to early 20th centuries, located at the centre of the original 17th-century Acadian settlement; the site of several pivotal events during the early years of the colonisation of Canada	Samuel de Champlain's diagram of Port Royal circa 1612
Antigonish County Court House	1855 (completed)	1981	Antigonish; 45°37′24″N 61°59′16″W	A wood-frame building with Greek Revival front facade and a stone jail attached at the rear; one of the best examples in Nova Scotia of mid-19th century Maritime court houses, which were typically simple frame buildings with classicized ornamental details	
Argyle Township Court House and Jail	1805 (completed)	2005	Tusket; 43°51′18″N 65°58′28″W	A two-storey wooden building constructed in the colonial meeting house style, now serving as a museum; the oldest known surviving combined court house and jail	Front facade of the white wooden Argyle Township Court House and Jail
Beaubassin	1672 (established)	2005	Fort Lawrence; 45°50′54.58″N 64°16′0.48″W	An archaeological site with remains from a major Acadian settlement that played a pivotal role in the 17th- and 18th-century struggle between the British and French for the region; the site also contains the Fort Lawrence NHS	Cairn dedicated to the families of Beaubassin
Bedford Petroglyphs		1994	Halifax; 44°43′47″N 63°40′5″W	Spiritually significant petroglyph site estimated to be 800-1,000 years old; located in Kejimkujik National Park, which has more than 500 Mi'kmaq petroglyphs itself	
Beinn Bhreagh Hall	1892–93 (built)	2018	Victoria County; 46°05′43.3″N 60°42′57.4″W	Home of inventor Alexander Graham Bell and family, name means "Beautiful Mountain" in Scottish Gaelic; landscape, climate, and Scottish culture reminiscent of birthplace in Edinburgh and where Bell had his most accomplishments performed	Beinn Bhreagh Hall
Black-Binney House	1819 (completed)	1965	Halifax; 44°38′38″N 63°34′17″W	A house reflective of the Palladian-inspired residences common during the late 18th and early 19th centuries in Eastern Canada; notable residents include John Black, James Boyle Uniacke and Hibbert Binney	
Bloody Creek	1711, 1757 (battles)	1930	Bridgetown; 44°49′20″N 65°18′33″W	Site of two battles, in 1711 and 1757, between British forces and allied French and aboriginal forces over control of Acadia; a cairn marks the site of the 1757 battle	Cairn at the site of the Battle of Bloody Creek
Canso Islands	1700s (commencement of long-term European occupation)	1925	Canso; 45°20′39.65″N 60°58′16.33″W	A group of islands which served as an important fishing base for the French in the 16th century and the British during the 18th century; the staging point for the 1745 expedition led by William Pepperrell and Peter Warren against Louisbourg	
Cast Iron Façade / Coomb's Old English Shoe Store	1860 (completed)	1981	Halifax; 44°38′59″N 63°34′29″W	A mid-19th-century commercial building with a cast-iron facade; one of the first cast-iron-front structures in Canada and the only building in Halifax known to have a facade composed entirely of cast iron	
Chapel Island		2003	Chapel Island First Nation; 45°43′0″N 60°46′57″W	An island which for centuries has been an important gathering place, location for government and site of spiritual significance for the Mi'kmaq people	Church and other buildings on Chapel Island seen from a distance
Chapman House	1780 (completed)	1968	Fort Lawrence; 45°52′29″N 64°14′46″W	A two-storey, red-brick Georgian house; representative of prosperous 18th-century Maritimes farmhouses	
Charles Fort	1629 (established)	1951	Annapolis Royal; 44°44′26.88″N 65°31′11.67″W	The site of William Alexander's former settlement, intended to establish the colony of "Nova Scotia"; occupied by Scottish colonists for 3 years, when the territory was restored to France	
Covenanters' Church	1811 (completed)	1976	Grand-Pré; 45°6′0″N 64°18′18″W	A simple frame and rectangular Presbyterian church, representative of the 18th-century New England meeting house style; also a component of the Grand-Pré Rural Historic District NHS	Covenanter Church, October 27, 2012
D'Anville's Encampment	1746 (encampment)	1925	Halifax; 44°40′28.98″N 63°38′47.57″W	The site where Duc d’Anville's forces camped along the shore on a failed expedition from France to recover Acadia	The Duc d'Anville Monument in Halifax
Debert Palaeo-Indian Site		1974	Debert; 45°24′59″N 63°25′24″W	The oldest archaeological site in Nova Scotia, and one of the most important Paleo-Indian sites in the province, with artifacts dating from 10,600 to 13,000 years ago	
de Gannes-Cosby House	1708 (built)	June 20, 2019	Annapolis Royal; 44.741094°N 65.512396°W	Rare surviving building from pre-Acadian expulsion era; used under French and British colonial regimes by officers	
Fernwood	1860 (c.) (completed)	1990	Halifax; 44°37′37″N 63°34′55″W	A house on a large landscaped property; a noted example of a Gothic Revival villa in Canada	Fernwood
Former Shubenacadie Indian Residential School	1930 to 1967	September 1, 2020	Shubenacadie; 45.096934°N 63.406806°W	Site of the only residential school in the Maritimes, where the federal government, churches and religious organizations worked to assimilate Native American children	
Fort Anne	1629 (established)	1920	Annapolis Royal; 44°44′28.47″N 65°31′6.72″W	The remains of a fort that played an important role in early European colonization, settlement and government in Acadia and Nova Scotia, and in the struggle between Britain and France for the area	Canons at Fort Anne overooking the water
Fort Edward	1750 (established)	1920	Windsor; 44°59′43.43″N 64°7′57.69″W	A fort that played an important role in the Seven Years' War, the expulsion of the Acadians, and the defence of Canada during the American Revolutionary War and the War of 1812; today comprises a wooden blockhouse and remnants of buildings and landscape features from the 18th-century fortifications.	The blockhouse at Fort Edward
Fort Lawrence	1750 (established)	1923	Fort Lawrence; 45°50′52″N 64°15′42″W	The archaeological remains of a fort erected in 1750 by the British to defend the Isthmus of Chignecto and abandoned in 1755 after the capture of Fort Beauséjour	Fort Lawrence memorial cairn erected by HSMB
Fort Lawrence Dock	1888-1891	1985	Fort Lawrence; 45°50′14″N 64°16′23″W	The Bay of Fundy terminus of the Chignecto Ship Railway. Plans called for a 150 m (490 ft) wide, 12 m (39 ft) deep basin to be excavated for massive equipment to lift ships out of the water and place them on a cradle driven by two railway locomotives, which would transfer ships 27 km (17 mi) over land to the Tidnish Dock across the Isthmus of Chignecto. The railway project failed and construction was halted in 1891. The basin and some of the massive stoneworks remain at the Fort Lawrence site.	
Fort McNab	1892 (completed)	1965	Halifax; 44°36′0″N 63°31′0″W	The remnants of defensive works constructed to defend Halifax when it was one of the principal naval stations of the British Empire; reflective of significant changes in defence technology in the late 19th century	Ruins of Fort McNab
Fort St. Louis	1623 (established)	1931	Port La Tour; 43°29′42″N 65°28′13″W	During the Scottish occupation of Port Royal from 1629 to 1632, this fort was France's only foothold in Acadia	
Fort Sainte Marie de Grace	1632 (established)	1924	LaHave, Nova Scotia; 44°17′17.93″N 64°21′4.86″W	The site where Isaac de Razilly built a fort, a settlement and the capital of the colony of Acadia after the Treaty of St. Germain-en-Laye returned the colony to France in 1632	
Fortress of Louisbourg	1713 (establishment)	1920	Louisbourg; 45°53′32.58″N 59°59′10.36″W	The largest reconstructed 18th-century French fortified town in North America; the fortress played a key role in the struggle between the French and British empires between 1713 and 1768	Fortress of Louisbourg seen from the water
Georges Island	1749 (first defence works)	1965	Halifax; 44°38′27″N 63°33′35″W	An island located in the middle of one of the finest natural harbours in the world; played a key role in the "Halifax Defence Complex" and protected one of the British Empire's principal naval stations during the 18th and 19th centuries	Georges Island as seen from the mainland
Government House	1805 (completed)	1982	Halifax; 44°38′36″N 63°34′17″W	Government House has served as an official residence for more than 175 years and is one of the oldest official residences in Canada	Government House seen from the gates
Grand-Pré *	1682 (first settlement of Acadians)	1982	Grand-Pré; 45°6′34″N 64°18′37″W	A centre of Acadian settlement and culture from 1682 until 1775; the site served as the British headquarters for the 1755–1763 deportation of the Acadians from Nova Scotia	The church of Grand-Pré and the statue of Évangéline
Grand-Pré Rural Historic District *	1682 (first settlement of Acadians)	1995	Kings County; 45°6′40″N 64°18′11″W	A rural cultural landscape surrounding the villages of Grand-Pré and Hortonville featuring one of the oldest land occupation and use patterns of European origin in Canada; representative of the adaptation of the first Acadian settlers to the conditions of North America	
Granville Block	1860–1904 (completion dates)	2007	Halifax; 44°38′59″N 63°34′28″W	A complex of 19 buildings, primarily four to five storeys in height, constructed in the years after a large fire in 1859; the rehabilitation of this block in the 1970s was an early success of the heritage preservation movement, and the block now accommodates NSCAD University	View of the facades of the Granville Block from the street
Grassy Island Fort	1720 (first small redoubt built by the British)	1962	Canso; 45°20′14.4″N 60°58′23.09″W	The remains of early 18th-century British fortifications (a 1720 redoubt, 1723-24 fort, and a 1745 blockhouse); part of the larger Canso Islands NHS	Green terrain of Grassy Island near the water
Halifax Citadel	1749 (established), 1828 (present fort commenced)	1935	Halifax; 44°38′50.63″N 63°34′48.87″W	A stone fortress built to defend what was one of the British Empire's four principal naval stations during the 18th and 19th centuries; a key element of the unique complex of shore defences in Halifax	Town clock at the Halifax Citadel
Halifax City Hall	1890 (completed)	1984	Halifax; 44°38′56″N 63°34′31″W	A three-storey municipal building with a seven-storey clock tower, prominently located on the Grand Parade; symbolic of the city halls built in the 19th century in medium-sized Canadian cities	Front facade of the Halifax City Hall
Halifax Court House	1860 (completed)	1969	Halifax; 44°38′37″N 63°34′25″W	An imposing sandstone court house built in the neoclassical style with Italianate detailing; representative of the judicial system of Nova Scotia	Front facade of the Halifax Court House
Halifax Drill Hall	1899 (completed)	1989	Halifax; 44°39′6″N 63°35′13″W	Richardsonian Romanesque drill hall designed by Thomas Fuller; representative of the second evolutionary stage in drill hall construction in Canada (1872–1895)	Detail of the Cornwallis Street facade, Halifax Armoury
Halifax Dockyard	1758 (established)	1923	Halifax; 44°39′31″N 63°35′1″W	Created in 1758 under the supervision of Captain James Cook, it was the earliest Royal Navy dockyard in North America; still in use by the Royal Canadian Navy	HMCS Fredericton (FFH 337) docked at the CFB Halifax dockyard in 2005
Halifax Public Gardens	1874 (established)	1983	Halifax; 44°38′34″N 63°34′56″W	A rare surviving example of a Victorian public garden in Canada; it continues to serve as a public park, with the original landscape design and planting traditions remaining essentially intact	Front gates for the Halifax Public Gardens
Halifax Waterfront Buildings	1815 to 1905 (constructed)	1963	Halifax; 44°39′1″N 63°34′23″W	A group of restored stone and wooden warehouses on the waterfront and adaptively reused for offices, shops and restaurants; the most significant pre-Confederation complex of maritime commercial buildings in Canada	
Halifax WWII Coastal Defences	1939–45 (period of service)	1994	Halifax; 44°35′45″N 63°33′4″W	Halifax was Canada's most heavily defended port during the Second World War and served as the main Allied convoy assembly point during the Battle of the Atlantic	The Sailor's Memorial in Halifax which features a plaque for the Halifax WWII Coastal Defences National Historic Site
Henry House	1834 (completed)	1969	Halifax; 44°38′25″N 63°34′15″W	A two-and-a-half-storey stone house representative of the style of residences built for the elite in early 19th-century British North America; the home of William Alexander Henry, a Father of Confederation and justice of the Supreme Court of Canada	1879 photograph of Henry House with a carriage out front
HMCS Sackville	1941 (entered service)	1988	Halifax; 44°38′51″N 63°34′9″W	One of the last Flower-class corvettes known to exist, a class of ship which played a key role in the Battle of the Atlantic	HMCS Sackville in Halifax Harbour
Hydrostone District	1917 (established)	1993	Halifax; 44°39′48″N 63°36′5″W	An excellent example of an English-style garden suburb in Canada; the country's first public housing project, planned by Thomas Adams and designed by Ross and Macdonald	Shops and streetscape in Halifax's Hydrostone district
Jonathan McCully House	1857 (completed)	1975	Halifax; 44°39′26″N 63°35′16″W	Italianate house which served as the residence of Jonathan McCully, a Father of Confederation, between 1863 and 1877	
Kejimkujik		1994	Kejimkujik National Park; 44°22′46.42″N 65°18′24.67″W	Coincident with the entire area of Kejimkujik National Park (except the seaside unit), this is a cultural landscape 404 square kilometres (156 sq mi) in size, in which petroglyph sites, habitation sites, fishing and hunting sites, travel routes and burial grounds attest to Mi’kmaq occupancy of this area for thousands of years	
King's College	1789 (established)	1923	Windsor; 44°58′58″N 64°8′9″W	The first university to be established in the Dominions of the British Empire; the original site of the oldest university in what was to become Canada (campus now located in Halifax)	The former Convocation Hall of King's College in Windsor
Knaut-Rhuland House	1793 (completed)	2002	Lunenburg; 44°22′36.49″N 64°18′32.97″W	A clapboard wood-frame house with neoclassical detailing; an early example of British classicism in Canada, a style which flourished in the country in the years that followed	Front facade of the Knaut-Rhuland House
Ladies' Seminary	1878 (completed)	1997	Wolfville; 45°5′20″N 64°21′57″W	A Second Empire style-building located on the Acadia University campus; constructed in 1878 as a home for women attending the university, it is Canada's oldest facility associated with the higher education of women	
Little Dutch (Deutsch) Church	1752 (land set aside for German community)	1997	Halifax; 44°39′21″N 63°35′8″W	A small wooden church surrounded by an 18th-century burying ground and a stone wall; the oldest known surviving church in Canada associated with the German Canadian community	Little Dutch (Deutsch) Church with tombstones in the foreground
Liverpool Town Hall	1902 (completed)	1984	Queens; 44°2′20″N 64°42′55″W	A former town hall now serving as a museum and theatre; its restrained classical detailing and wooden construction are rare for town halls of this scale constructed in the 20th century in Canada	Front facade of the Liverpool Town Hall with war memorial and Canadian flag in the foreground
Lunenburg Academy	1895 (completed)	1983	Lunenburg; 44°22′48″N 64°18′50″W	A highly visible Second Empire style-building located atop Gallows Hill; a rare surviving academy building, representative of a significant evolution in Nova Scotia's education system in the 19th century when publicly funded county academies were introduced to provide high-quality secondary education	Lunenburg Academy
Marconi National Historic Site	1902 (first transatlantic radio transmission)	1939	Glace Bay; 46°12′42″N 59°57′8″W	The isolated site where Guglielmo Marconi received the first transatlantic radio telegraph message; comprises the remains of two telegraph towers that once supported Marconi's antennae and the foundation walls of his receiving room and powerhouse	
Marconi Wireless Station	1905 (established)	1983	Cape Breton Regional Municipality; 46°9′17″N 59°56′44″W	A 350-hectare (860-acre) site containing the foundations of aerial towers and three abandoned buildings; location of the wireless station which, along with a sister station in Ireland, was the first to provide regular public intercontinental radio service commencing in 1908	Old postcard of radio towers at Marconi site
Melanson Settlement	1664 (established)	1987	Annapolis County; 44°42′41″N 65°36′40″W	The remains (a dyked terrace and subsurface archaeological resources) of a pre-expulsion Acadian village in the salt marshes of the Annapolis River; representative of Acadian settlements and their unique form of agriculture along the Dauphin (now Annapolis) River	
Melville Island and Deadman's Island	1790s-1856 and 1909-1939	2016	Halifax; 44.635°N 63.614°W	POW and military prison, medical facility, quarantine and immigration station	
Nova Scotia Coal Fields (Sydney)		1998	Sydney; 46°14′32″N 60°3′41″W	Surviving clusters of in situ resources associated with the fields and the coal industry	
Nova Scotia Coal Fields (Stellarton)		1998	Stellarton; 45°34′5″N 62°39′27″W	Surviving clusters of in situ resources associated with the fields and the coal industry	
Old Barrington Meeting House	1765 (completed)	1966	Barrington Head; 43°34′0″N 65°34′47″W	Wood frame building erected by settlers from New England; one of the oldest surviving buildings in English-speaking Canada, and a good example of a New England–style colonial meeting house	
Old Burying Ground	1749 (establishment)	1991	Halifax; 44°38′36.24″N 63°34′22.08″W	A 0.91-hectare (2.2-acre) early graveyard surrounded by a stone wall and decorative iron fence; a unique concentration of gravestone art, symbolizing the cultural traditions of early British North America	Crimean War Monument at the Old Burying Ground
Old Town Lunenburg Historic District	1753 (established)	1991	Lunenburg; 44°22′40″N 64°18′35″W	The core area of the town and a well-preserved example of 18th-century colonization and settlement patterns; a World Heritage Site, and one of the earliest and most intact British model plans in Canada	
Pictou Academy	1818 (established)	1937	Pictou; 45°40′36″N 62°42′54″W	The original site of the Pictou Academy, today marked by a cairn; founded by Thomas McCulloch, the Academy introduced nonsectarian education to the Maritimes	
Pictou Railway Station (Intercolonial)	1904 (completed)	1976	Pictou; 45°40′33″N 62°42′21″W	An eclectic former passenger terminal with Châteauesque, Elizabethan and Palladian elements; representative of the Intercolonial Railway, a line which forged a link between the Maritimes and Central Canada	Pictou Railway Station
Pier 21	1928 (completed), 1944 (rebuilt)	1997	Halifax; 44°38′18.04″N 63°33′54.72″W	An ocean passenger terminal which witnessed the massive stream of post Second World War immigration to Canada from Europe, including the arrival of war brides; the last intact example of its type, and the embodiment of early 20th-century Canadian immigration	Front facade of Pier 21
Port-Royal	1605 (established), 1939 (reconstruction)	1923	Annapolis County; 44.71146°N 65.60947°W	A historic reconstruction of an early 17th-century French fort; symbolic of the legacy of the local Acadian and Mi'kmaq peoples in 1605–1613, and a milestone in the 20th-century Canadian heritage movement	Courtyard at Habitation at Port-Royal
Prince of Wales Tower	1799 (completed)	1943	Halifax; 44°37′17.6″N 63°34′11.09″W	A large martello tower which played a significant role in the development of Halifax as one of the four principal naval stations of the British Empire during the 18th and 19th centuries	Prince of Wales martello tower with park bench in foreground
Province House	1819 (completed)	1993	Halifax; 44°38′52.81″N 63°34′24.71″W	The longest serving legislative building in Canada and one of the best examples of Palladian architecture in the country; the birthplace of responsible government and freedom of the press in Canada	Province House
Royal Battery	1728 (completed)	1952	Louisbourg; 45°54′33.67″N 59°58′49.73″W	An archaeological site where the outline of the battery’s ditch, glacis and tower mounds are still evident; built by the French as part of the defences of Louisbourg harbour, the battery played a significant role in the 1745 and 1758 sieges of Louisbourg	
S.S. Acadia	1913 (launched)	1976	Halifax; 44°38′53″N 63°34′12″W	A steel, purpose-built hydrographic vessel launched in 1913 and now berthed at a Halifax wharf; a pioneering oceanography research ship which took a lead role in charting Hudson Bay	The S.S. Acadia anchored in Halifax Harbour
Sainte-Anne / Port Dauphin	1629 (established)	1929	Englishtown; 46°16′53″N 60°32′38″W	Founded by Captain Charles Daniel as a Jesuit mission and later a naval base, its importance declined with the choice of Louisbourg as the capital in 1719	
Sinclair Innl	1710 (earliest elements)	1983	Annapolis Royal; 44°44′41″N 65°31′10″W	A wooden former hotel which evolved with the amalgamation of at least two buildings, one dating from the Acadian era; the building stands as a composite of three centuries of materials, construction techniques and architectural styles	
Sir Frederick Borden Residence	1864 (completed), 1902 (renovated in Queen Anne style)	1990	Canning; 44°44′41″N 65°31′10″W	Former home of Frederick William Borden, located in a park-like setting; a good example of Queen Anne style architecture in domestic buildings	
Springhill Coal Mining	1873 (commencement of coal mining)	1998	Springhill; 45°38′41″N 64°3′55″W	A former coalfield with surface and underground mining features that are unique to Nova Scotia; at one time one of Canada's most commercially important coalfields	Entrance to a Springhill mine shaft
St. George's Anglican Church / Round Church	1812 (completed)	1983	Halifax; 44°39′12.55″N 63°34′58.79″W	A cylindrical wooden church associated with the early history of Halifax; an excellent example of Palladian architecture in Canada	Round St. George's Anglican Church
St. John's Anglican Church	1763 (completed)	1994	Lunenburg; 44°22′41″N 64°18′41″W	A Carpenter Gothic church in the heart of Lunenburg; played an important role in the establishment of British authority and of the Church of England in 18th-century Nova Scotia	Front facade of St. John's Anglican Church as seen from across the church grounds
St. Mary's Cathedral Basilica	1820 (established)	1997	Halifax; 44°38′40.07″N 63°34′24.07″W	A large Gothic Revival church associated with individuals and events which played a central role in the emancipation of Roman Catholics in Nova Scotia and in Canada	St. Mary's Basilica
St. Paul's Anglican Church	1750 (completed)	1981	Halifax; 44°38′51″N 63°34′29″W	A small wooden church with a gable roof and central steeple; the first building erected in Canada in the Palladian style, and the first church outside Great Britain to be designated an Anglican cathedral	St. Paul's Anglican Church
St. Peter's	1630 (established)	1929	St. Peter's; 45°39′18″N 60°52′10″W	An archaeological site with resources related to 17th- and 18th-century Mi’kmaq and Acadian communities; the site of Fort Saint-Pierre, a 17th-century fortified trading post, and Port-Toulouse, a French community established in 1713	
St. Peters Canal	1869 (completed)	1929	St. Peter's; 45°39′12.27″N 60°52′9.56″W	A canal that connects Bras d'Or Lake with St. Peter's Bay on the Atlantic Ocean; a cultural landscape associated with the construction and operation of the canal	St. Peters Canal seen from nearby hillside
Sydney WWII Coastal Defences	1939-45	1994	Sydney; 46°14′39″N 60°12′41″W	As a safe port protected by seven coastal gun batteries during the Second World War, Sydney played an important role in the efforts of the RCN and the RCAF to keep open the vital North Atlantic supply routes	
Thinkers' Lodge	1957 (conference)	2008	Pugwash; 45°51′13″N 63°39′57″W	The birthplace at the height of the Cold War of the Pugwash movement, a transnational organization for nuclear disarmament and world peace	Thinkers' Lodge
Tidnish Bridge	1888-1891	2007	Tidnish Bridge; 45°58′35″N 64°2′37″W	A keystone bridge constructed to carry the Chignecto Ship Railway, which was cancelled in 1891. The bridge now carries the Henry Ketchum Trail over the Tidnish River.	Tidnish Bridge
Tidnish Dock	1888-1891	2007	Tidnish Cross Roads; 45°59′51″N 64°0′29″W	The Northumberland Strait terminus of the Chignecto Ship Railway, cancelled in 1891. Remains of the dock can be seen at low tide.	
Trinity Anglican Church	1878 (completed)	1990	Digby; 44°37′13″N 65°45′26″W	A good example of the work of architect Stephen C. Earle and of a church in Canada built in the American Ecclesiological Gothic Revival tradition	Trinity Anglican Church
Truro Old Normal College	1877 (completed)	2018	Truro; 45.364010°N 63.278690°W	Aside from being an excellent example of Second Empire architecture, Truro Old Normal College, built in 1877, is a testament to the movement to standardize and improve teacher training in the second half of the 19th century, and is associated with the development of Nova Scotia's public education system.	
Truro Post Office	1886 (completed)	1983	Truro; 45°21′55″N 63°16′50″W	A good example of the post offices erected by the federal Department of Public Works in smaller urban centres throughout the country during Thomas Fuller’s term as Dominion Chief Architect	
Wolfe's Landing	1758 (landing)	1929	Cape Breton Regional Municipality; 45°52′45″N 60°3′18″W	During the Seven Years' War, the site where British forces in James Wolfe's brigade launched their successful attack on the French forces at the Fortress of Louisbourg	
York Redoubt	1793 (established)	1962	Halifax; 44.596583°N 63.552439°W	Major seaward defences of Halifax Harbour from the American Revolutionary War until the Second World War; illustrates the historical evolution of the Halifax Harbour defence system	WWII observation posts on shoreline at York Redoubt

== See also ==
- Heritage Property Act (Nova Scotia)
- History of Nova Scotia
- List of historic places in Nova Scotia
