= L'Orignal Jail =

Jail in Ontario, Canada 1825–1998

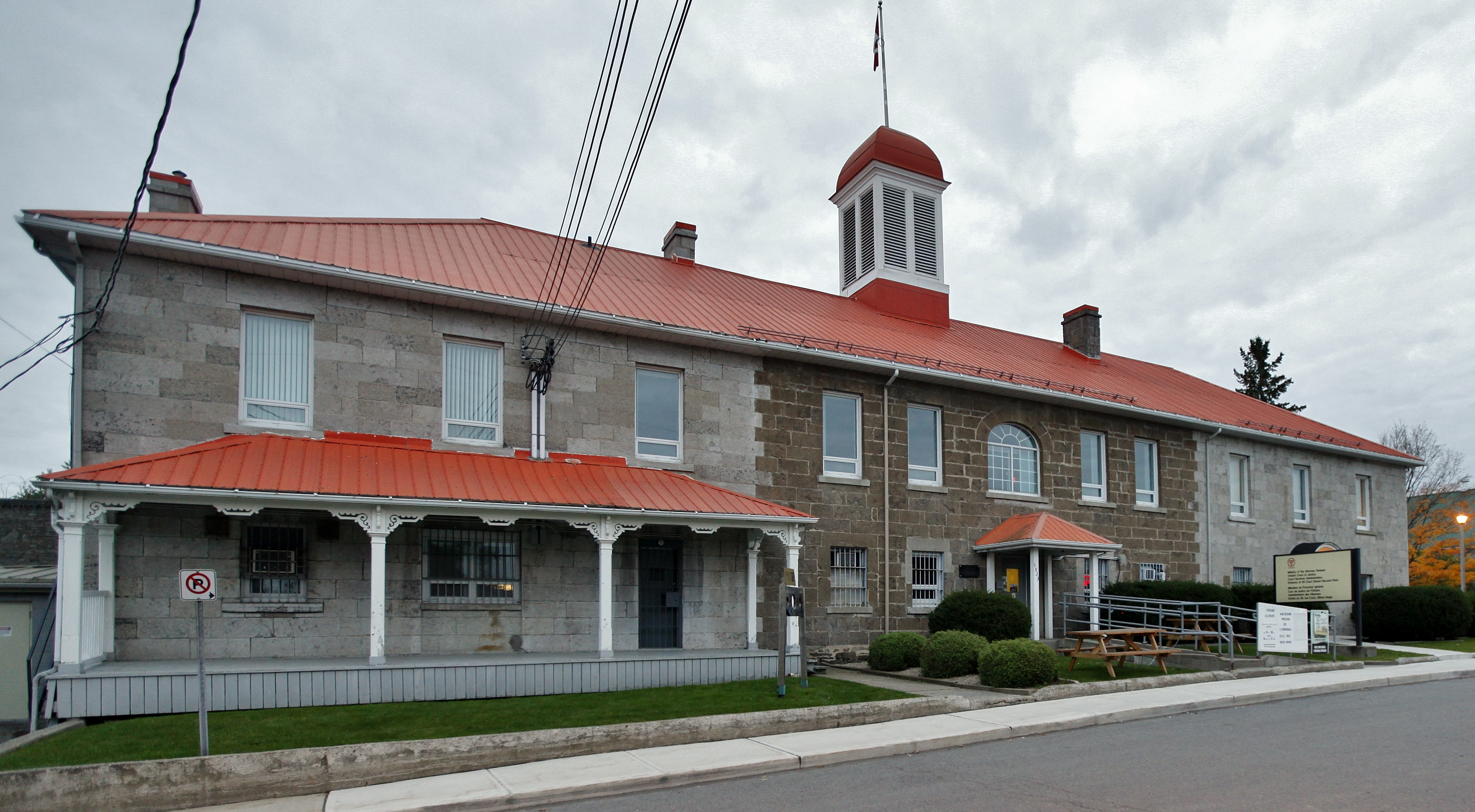
- Interactive map of L'Orignal Jail
- Location: 45°37′09″N 74°41′25″W
- Opened: 1825
- Closed: 1998
- Website: https://www.lorignalprison.com

Ontario Heritage Act
- Designated: 2007

L'Orignal Jail is a former jail in L'Orignal (now Champlain), Ontario, Canada, built between 1824 and 1825 and decommissioned in 1998. It has since been restored and opened for guided tours during the summer. It is the oldest jail and courthouse in Ontario and the second-oldest in Canada, following the Argyle Township Court House & Gaol.

== History ==
In 1823, the need for a jailhouse and court to cover the Ottawa district arose. Jacob Marston, a prominent local, volunteered to give 2 acres (0.81 ha) of land in the district town of L'Orignal to build the joint jailhouse and court. Construction began in 1824 and finished in 1825, with the addition of a west wing in 1850 and an east wing in 1862. Additions were further made to the west wing and rear of the building in 1870 and 1940 respectively. The county seat of the United Counties of Prescott-Russell (UCPR) was added in 1962.

The jail acted under the jurisdiction of the UCPR up until 1968 when the Ontario government assumed responsibility. During its 173 years of operation, the courthouse has held over 500 inmates and has held five hangings in its courtyard. The first hanging was in 1883 and the last in 1933.

The jail was decommissioned in 1998. It was designated as a heritage site under Part IV of the Ontario Heritage Act by the Township of Champlain on June 20, 2007, and converted to a tourist attraction. The second floor of the jail is a provincial courthouse that is still active today.

On the 175th anniversary of the UCPR and the 200th anniversary of the jail, a commemorative time capsule built in the shape of the building was sealed with the intention to open it on the 225th anniversary of the jail.

== Building ==
The original building is made of hand-quarried stone work and is an example of Neoclassical and Royalist architecture. The building has a distinctive orange metal hip roof.

Gallery

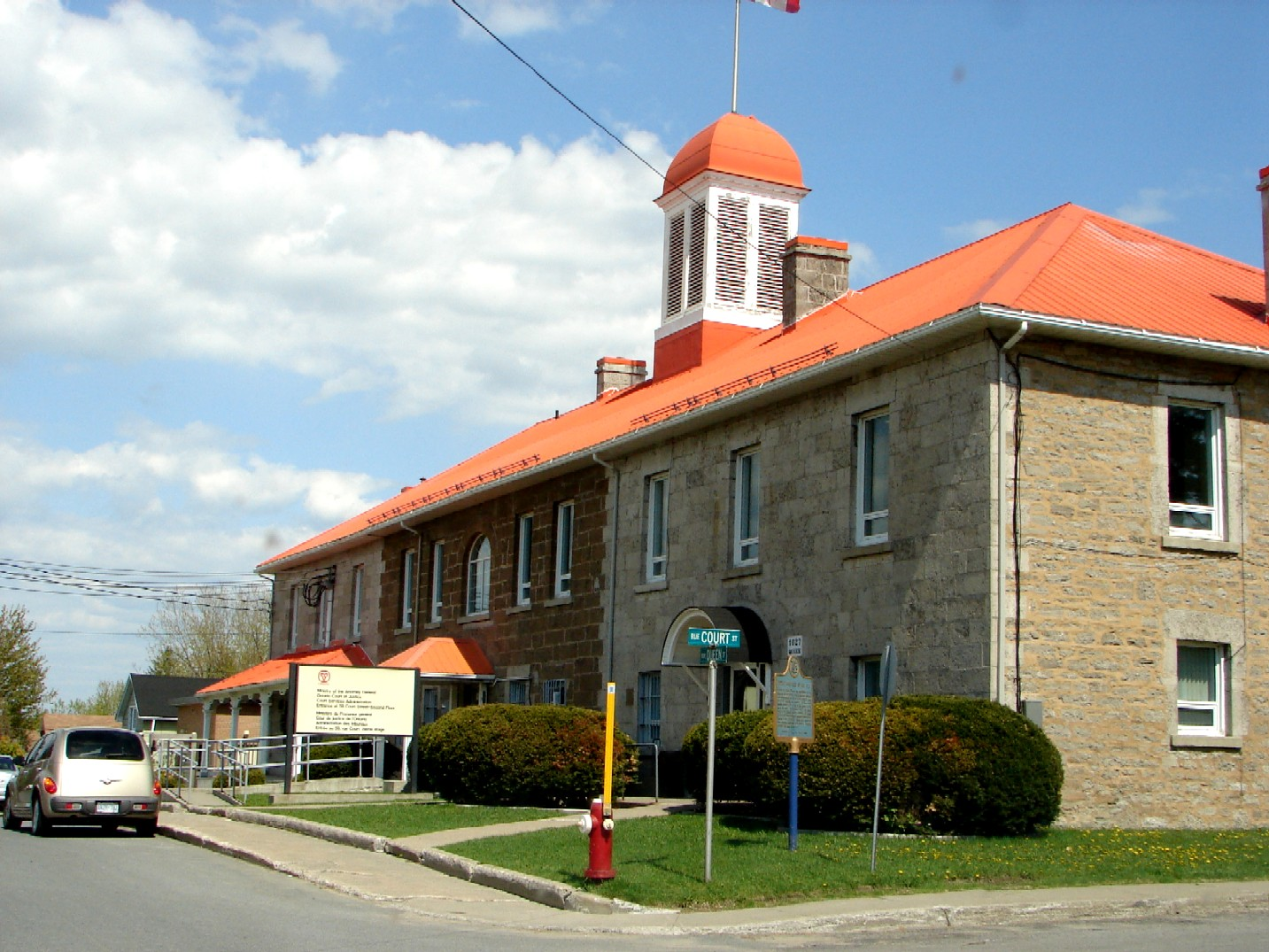
Side view of the jailhouse

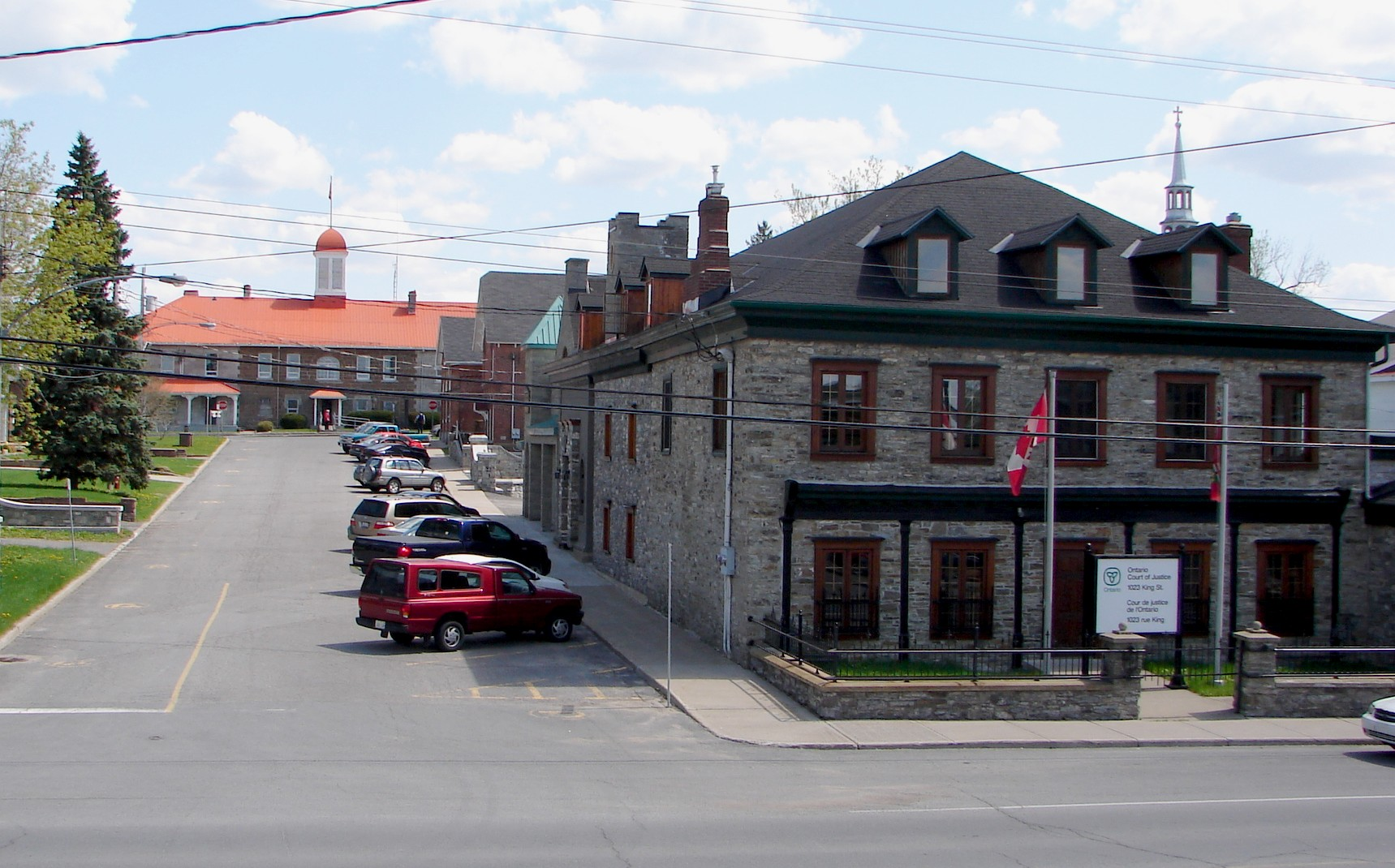
The jailhouse and adjoining court building as seen from King Street
