= Mason's mark =

Symbol on dressed stone in buildings

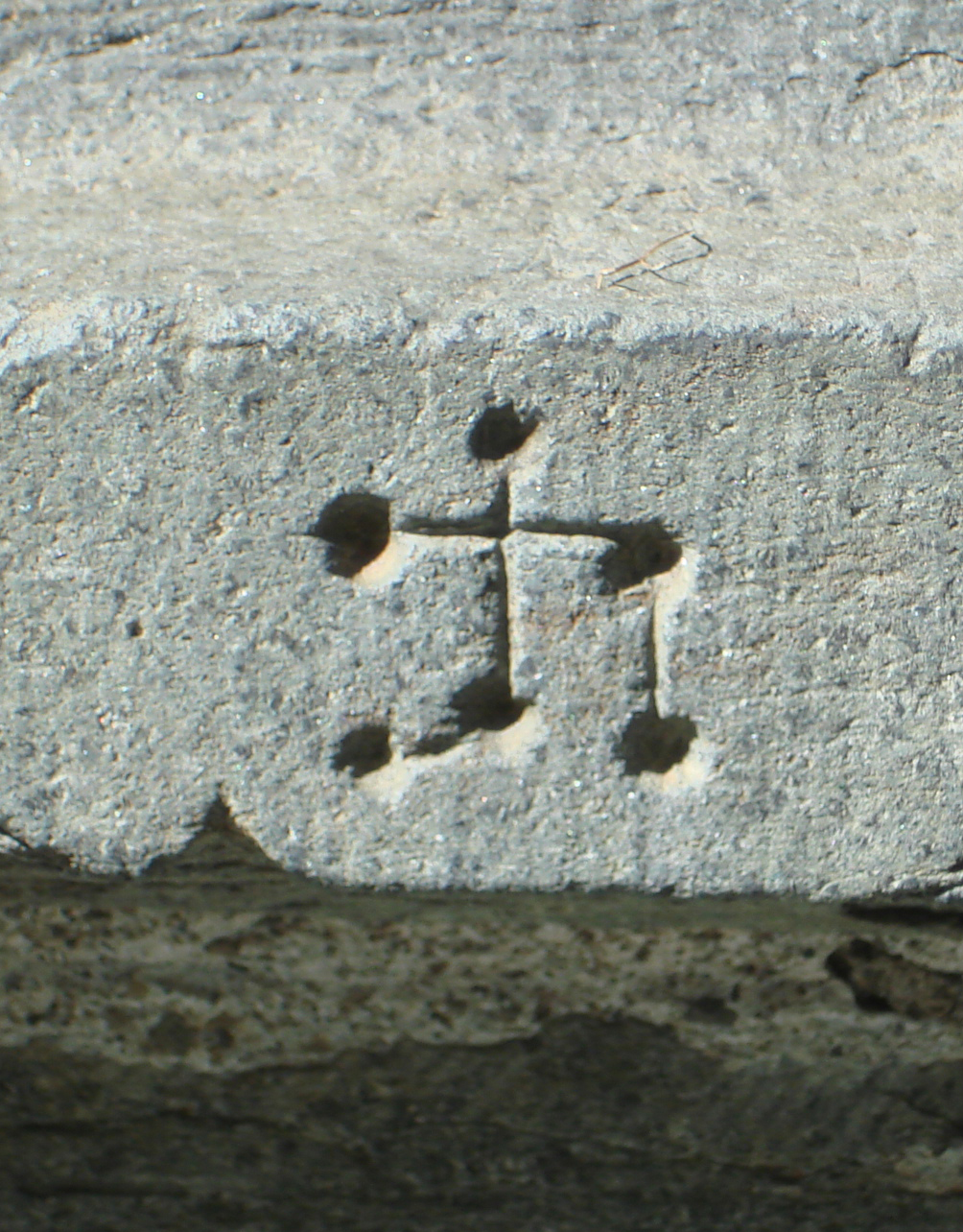
Mason's mark, Nidaros Cathedral, Norway, early 14th century

A mason's mark is an engraved symbol often found on dressed stone in buildings and other public structures.

== In stonemasonry ==
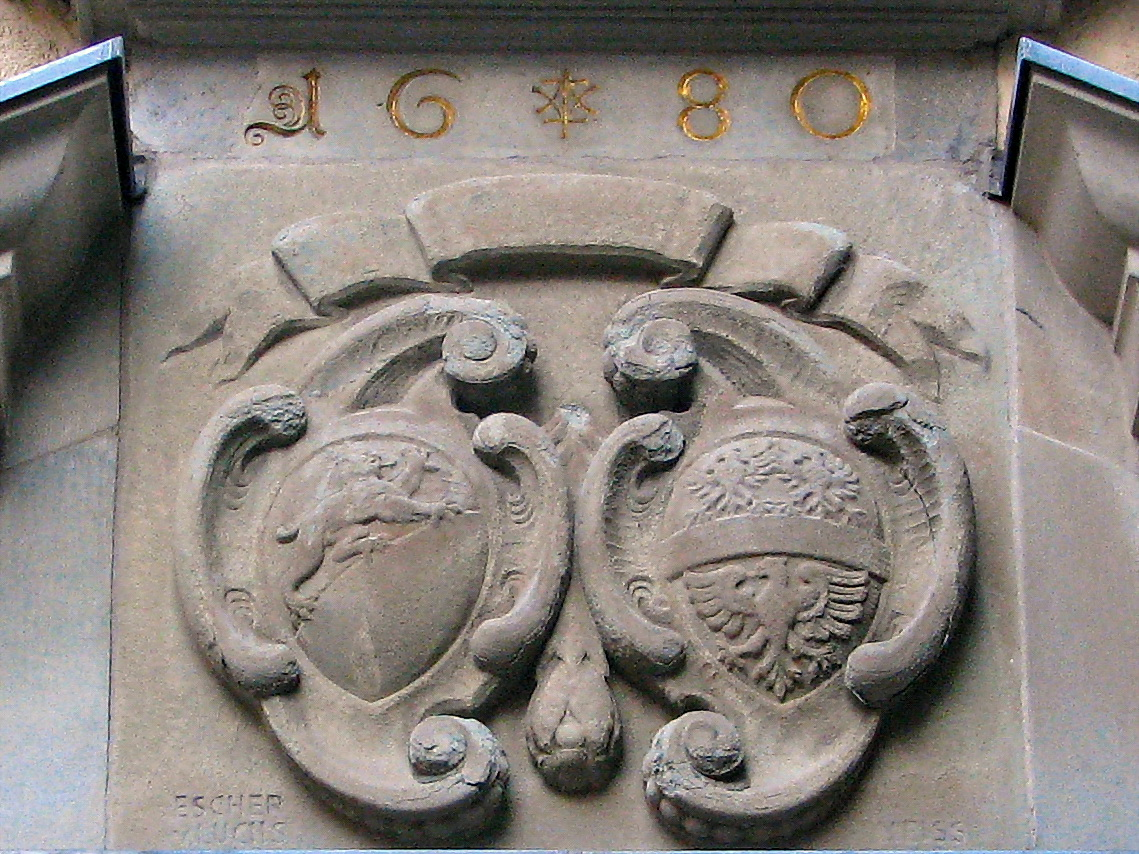
Mason's marks above engravings on Brunnenturm's portal in Zürich

Regulations issued in Scotland in 1598 by James VI's Master of Works, William Schaw, stated that on admission to the guild, every mason had to enter his name and his mark in a register. There are three types of marks used by stonemasons.

- Banker marks were made on stones before they were sent to be used by the walling masons. These marks served to identify the banker mason who had prepared the stones for their paymaster. This system was employed only when the stone was paid for by measure, rather than by time worked. For example, the 1306 contract between Richard of Stow, mason, and the Dean and Chapter of Lincoln Cathedral, specified that the plain walling would be paid for by measure, and indeed banker marks are found on the blocks of walling in this cathedral. Conversely, the masons responsible for walling the eastern parts of Exeter Cathedral were paid by the week, and consequently few banker marks are found on this part of the cathedral. Banker marks make up the majority of masons' marks, and are generally what are meant when the term is used without further specification.
- Assembly marks were used to ensure the correct installation of important pieces of stonework. For example, the stones on the window jambs in the chancel of North Luffenham church in Rutland are each marked with a Roman numeral, directing the order in which the stones were to be installed.
- Quarry stones were used to identify the source of a stone, or occasionally the quality.

== In Freemasonry ==
Freemasonry, a fraternal order that uses an analogy to stonemasonry for much of its structure, also makes use of marks. A Freemason who takes the degree of Mark Master Mason will be asked to create his own Mark, as a type of unique signature or identifying badge. Some of these can be quite elaborate.

== Gallery of masons' marks ==
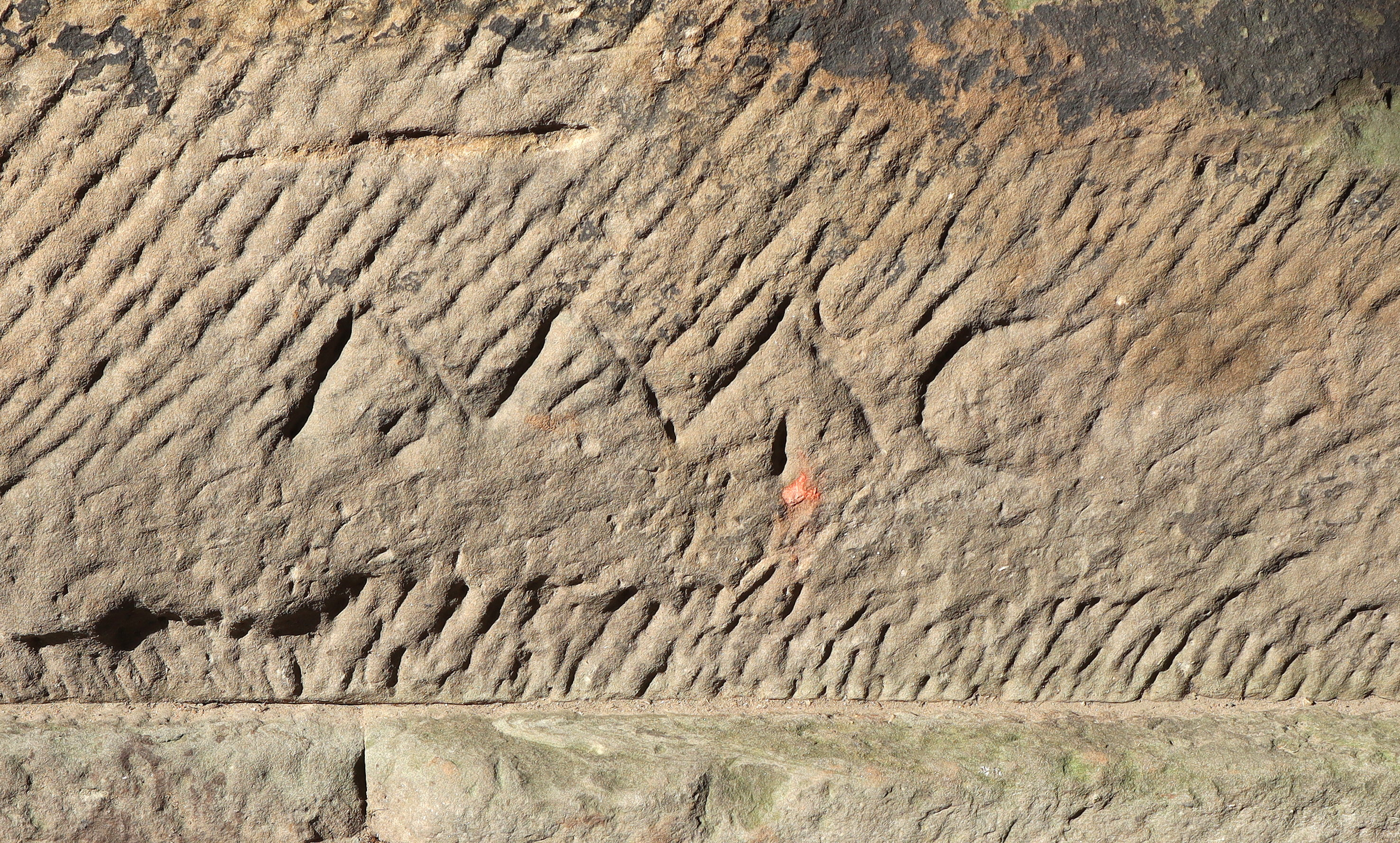
Ancient Roman mason's mark at the Porta Nigra in Trier, Germany

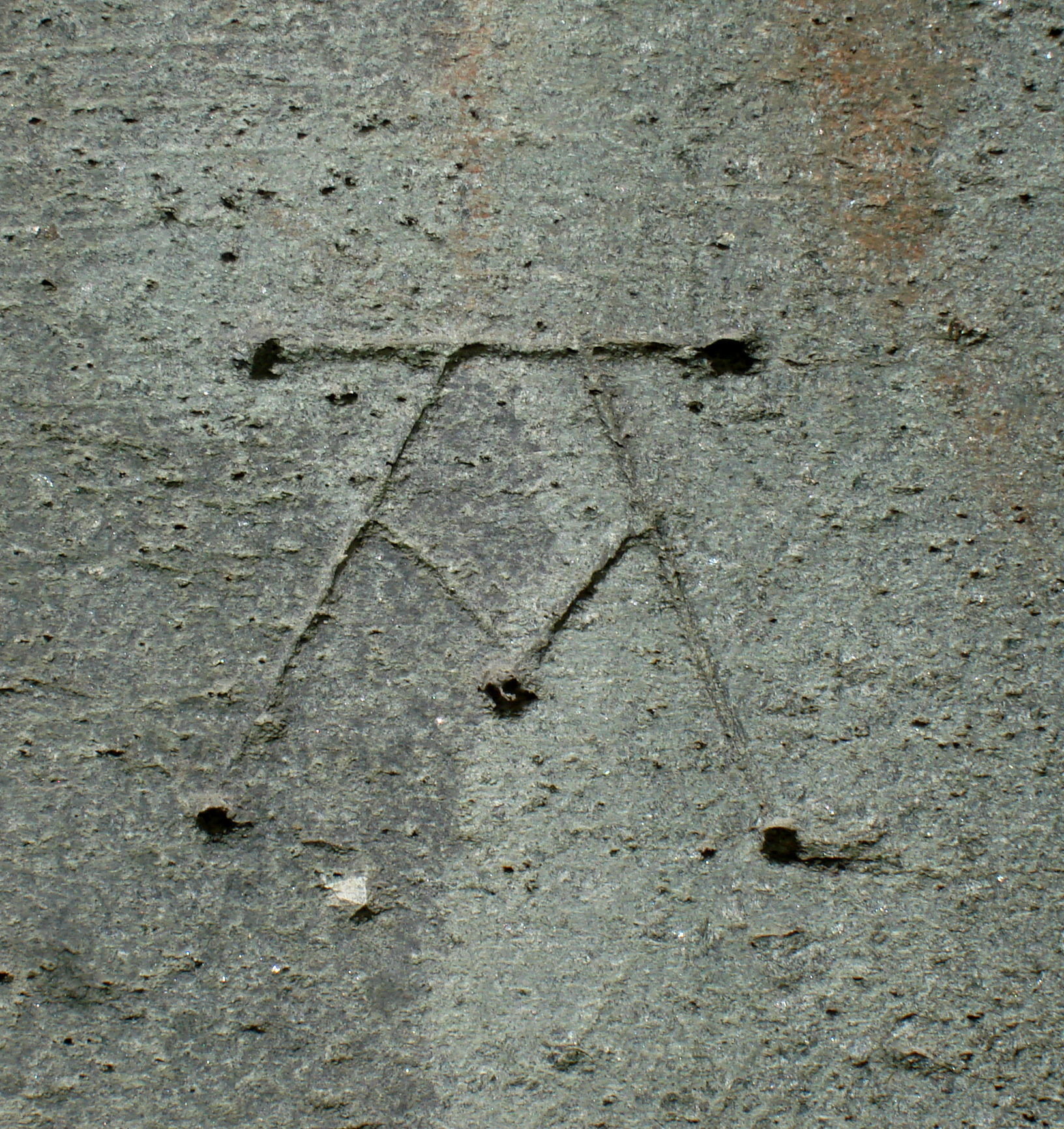
Mason's mark from Nidaros Cathedral, Trondheim, Norway, late 12th century

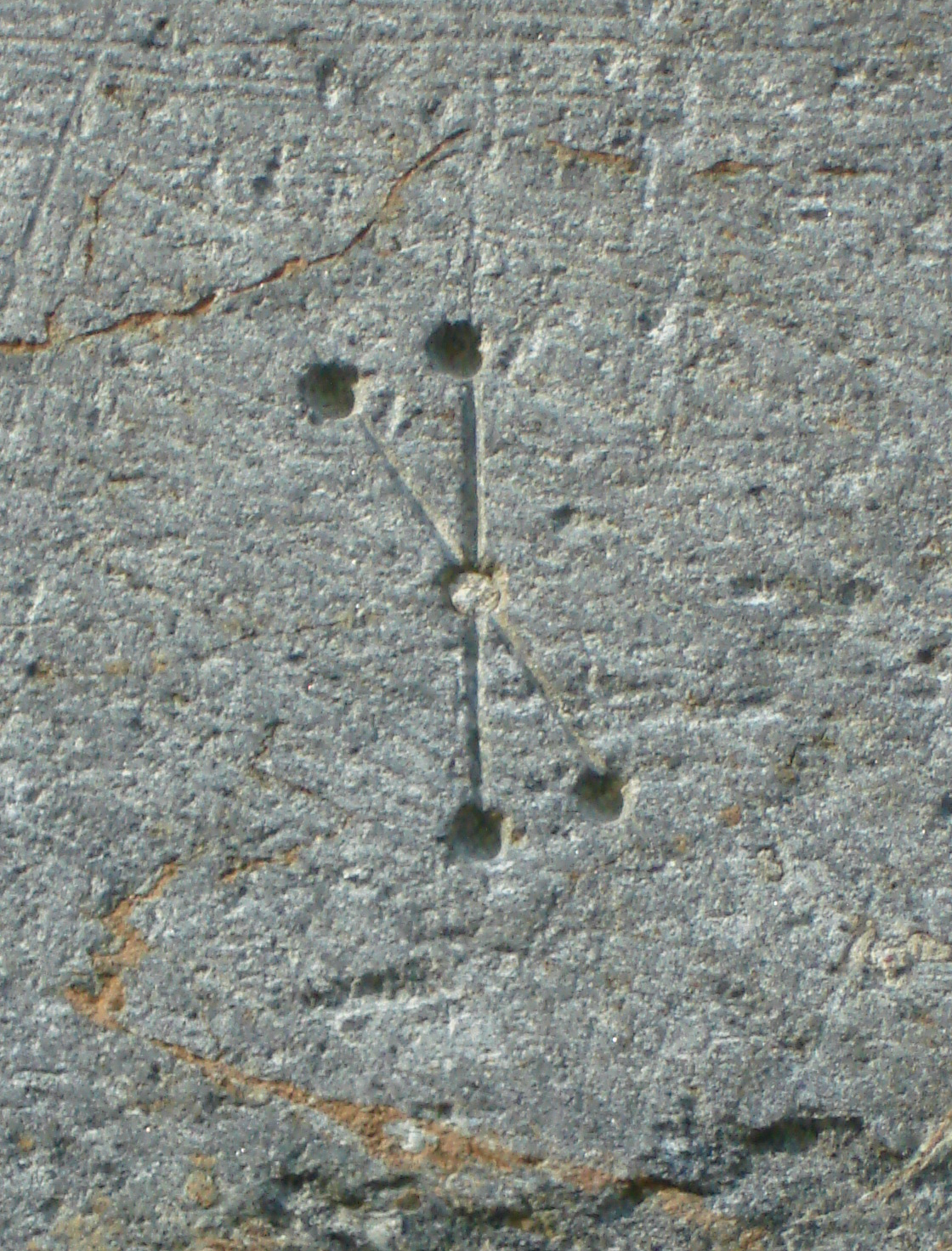
Masons's mark from Vår Frue Church, Trondheim, Norway, 12th century

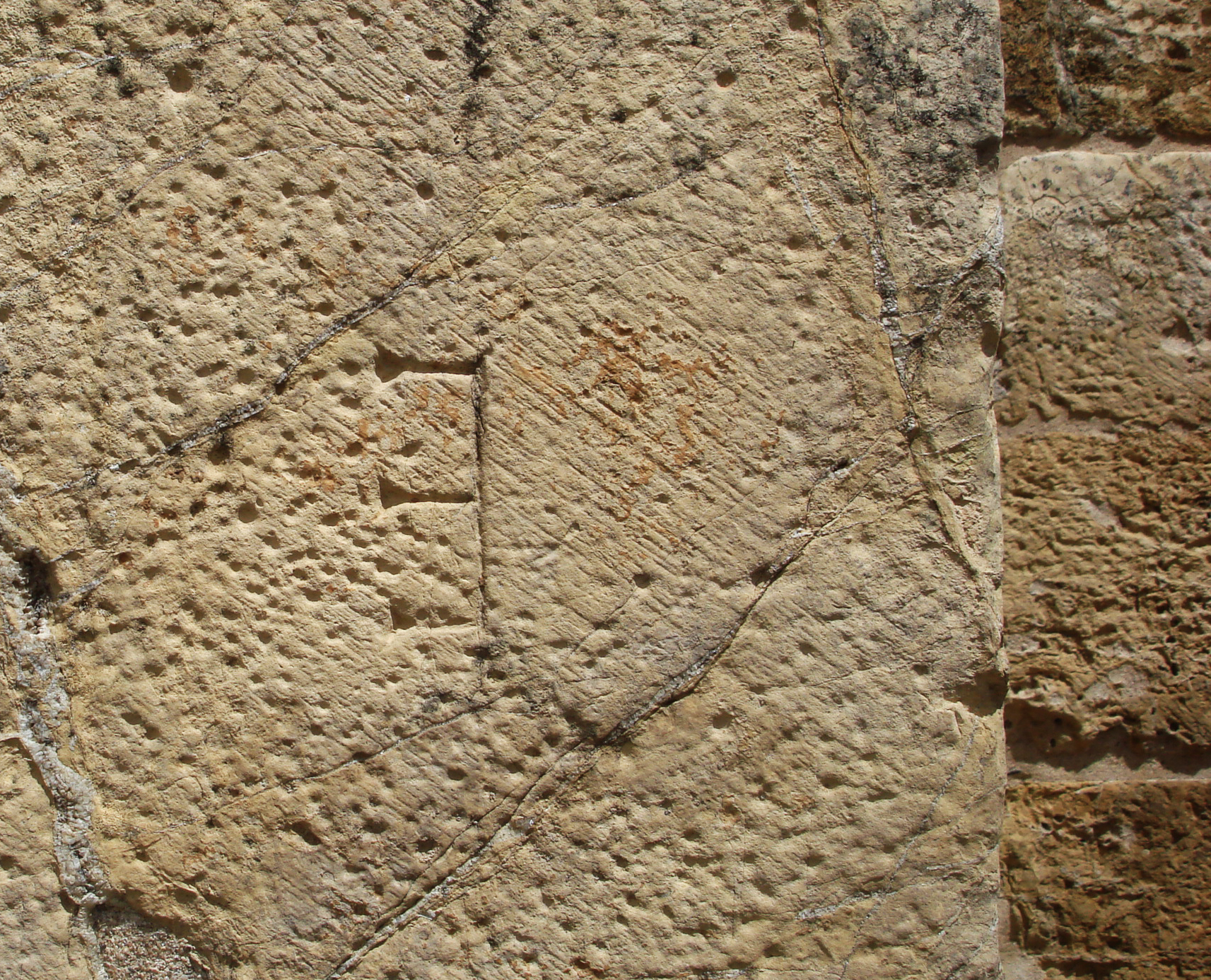
Mason's mark on exterior of Coimbra Cathedral, Portugal, 12th century

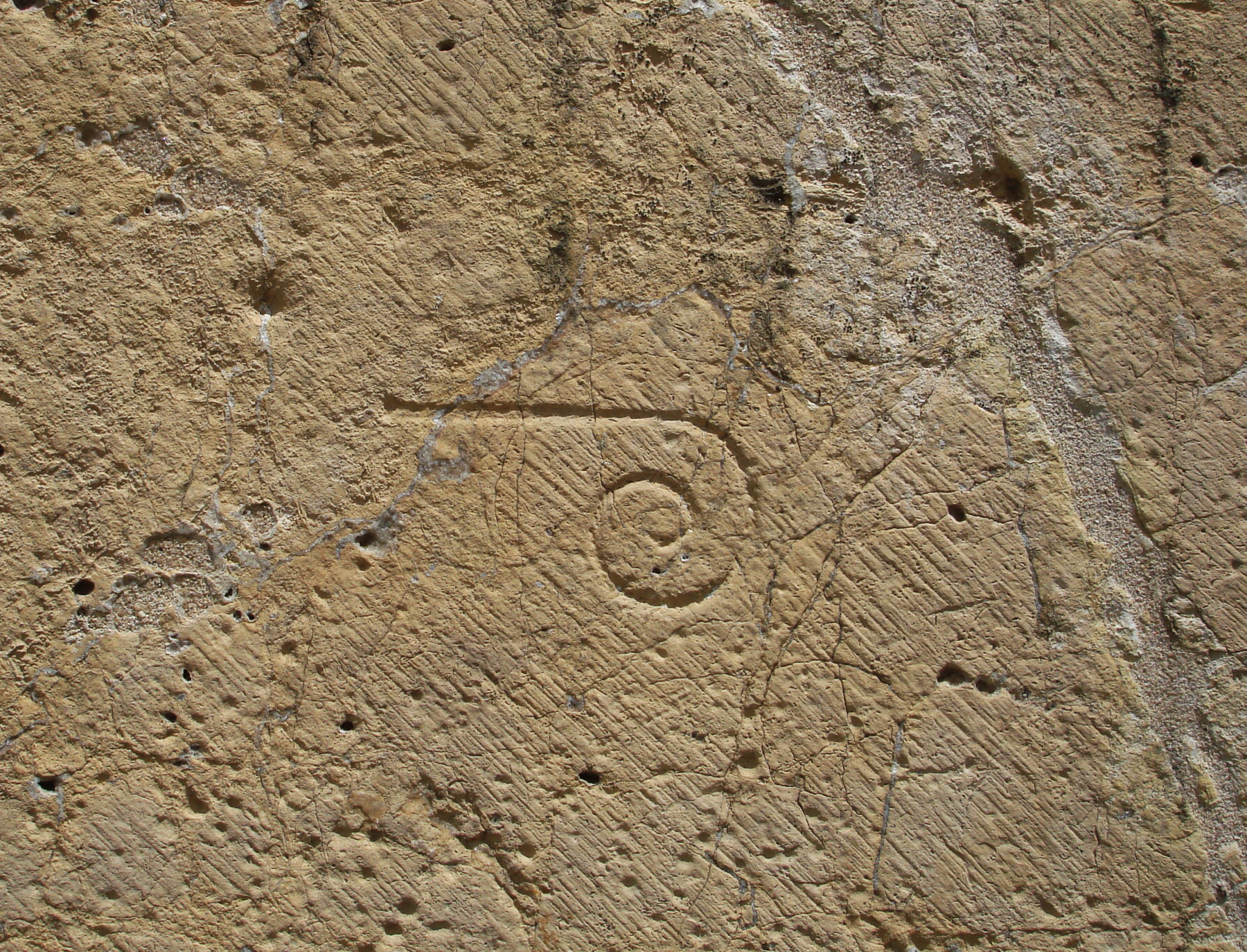
Mason's mark on exterior of Coimbra Cathedral, Portugal, 12th century

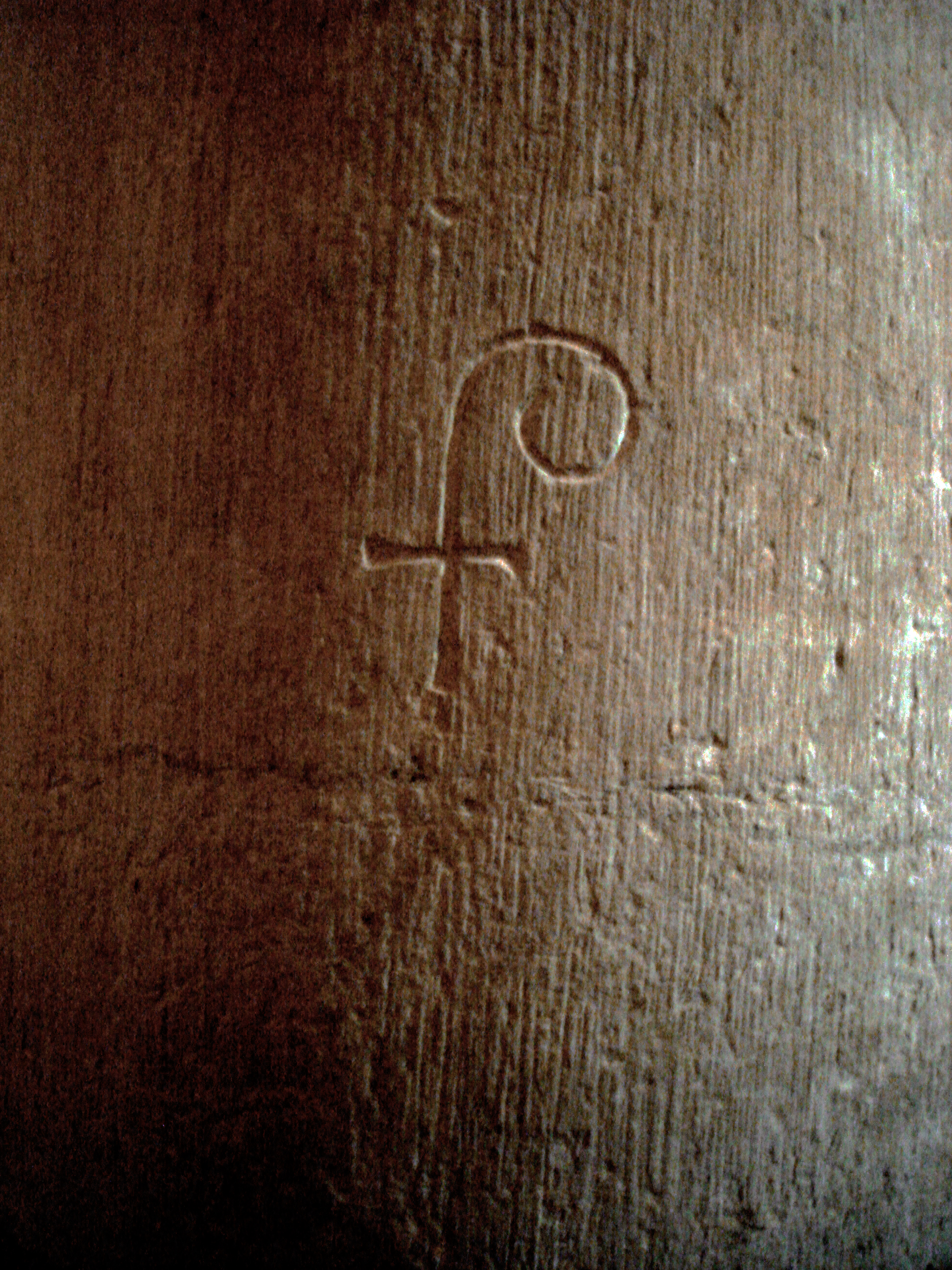
Mason's mark on interior column of Coimbra Cathedral, Portugal, 12th century

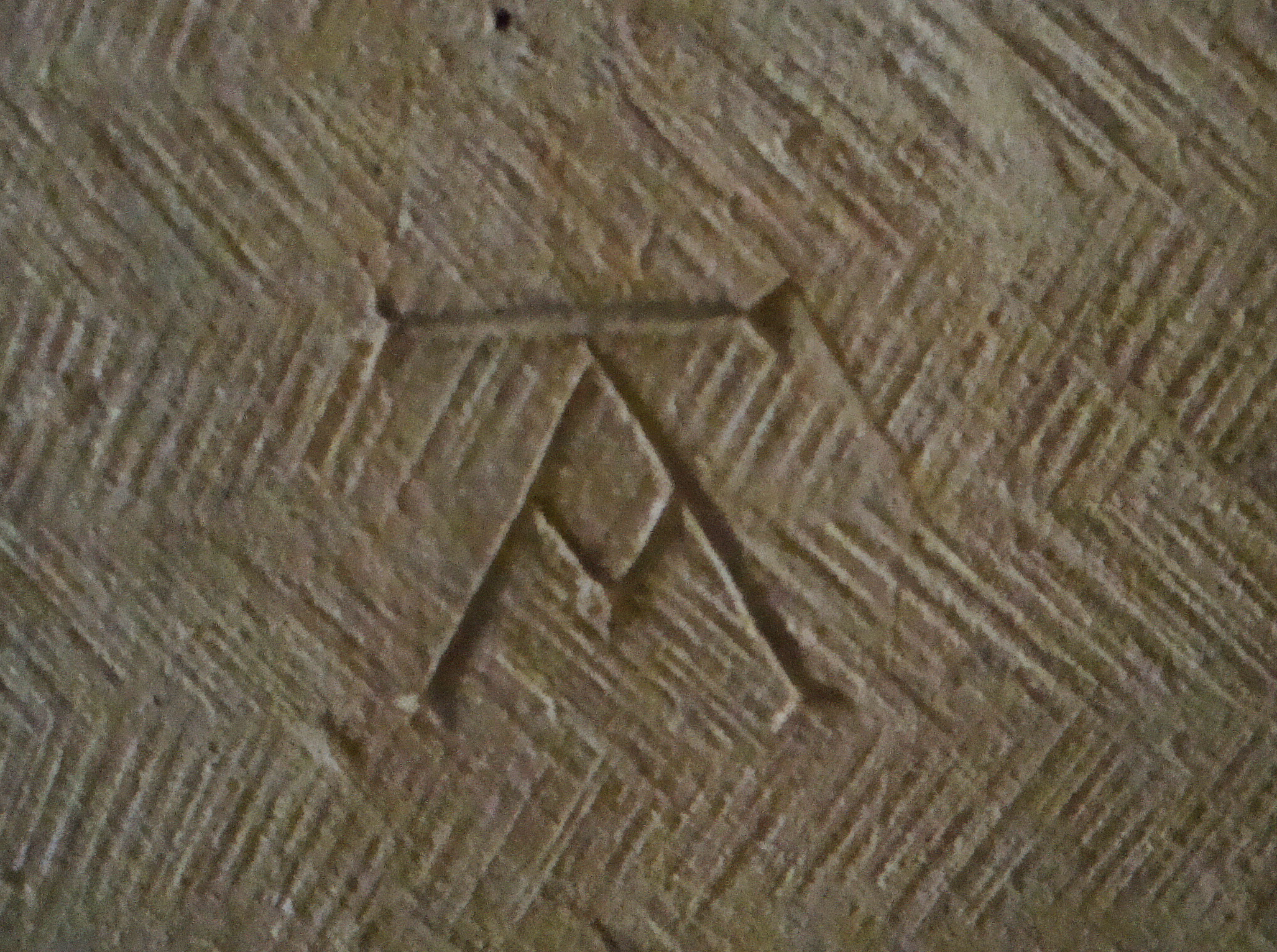
Mason's mark in the Église Saint-Honorat in Alyscamps, France, early 13th century

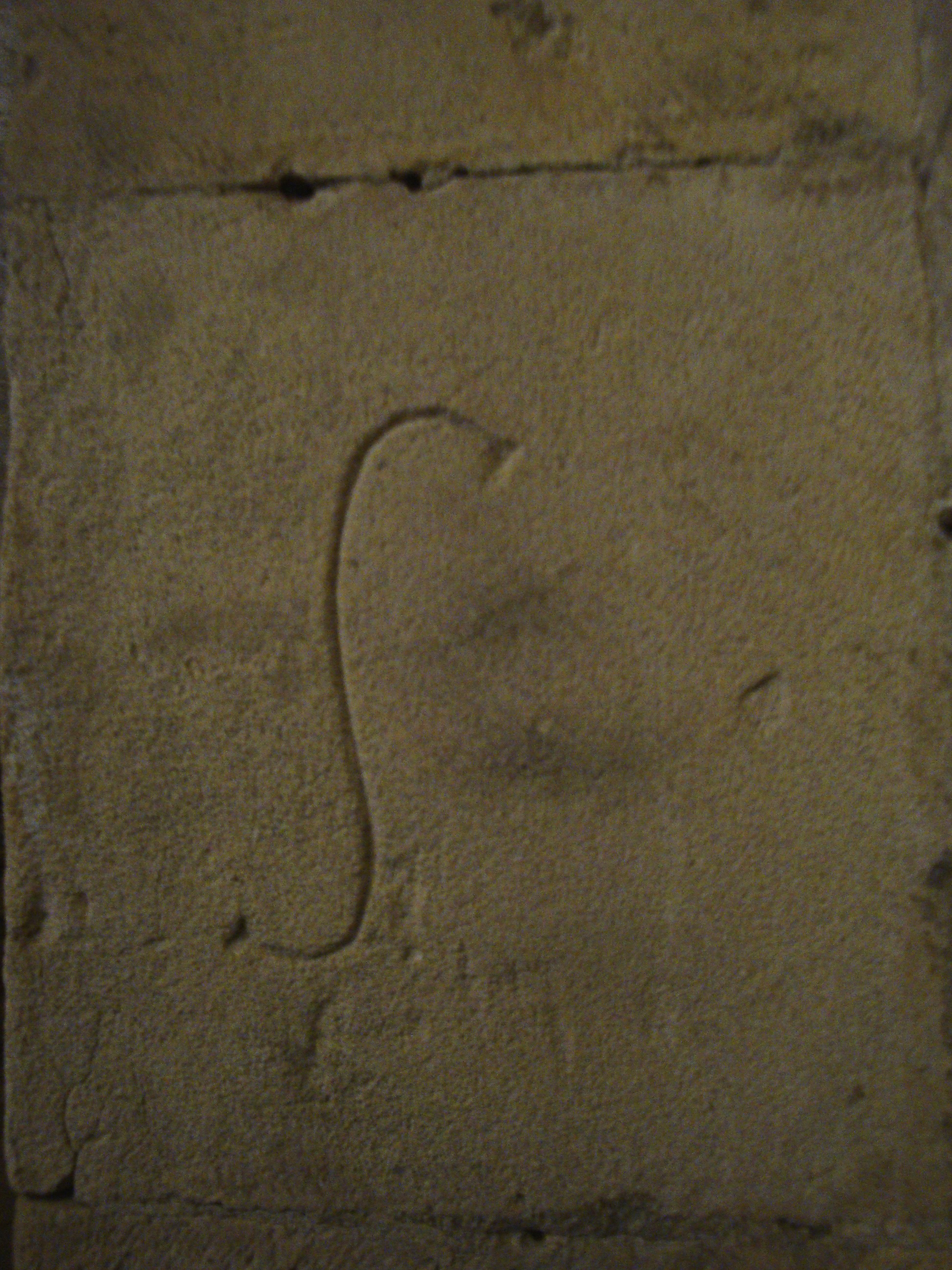
Mason's mark in the Église Saint-Honorat in Alyscamps France, early 13th century

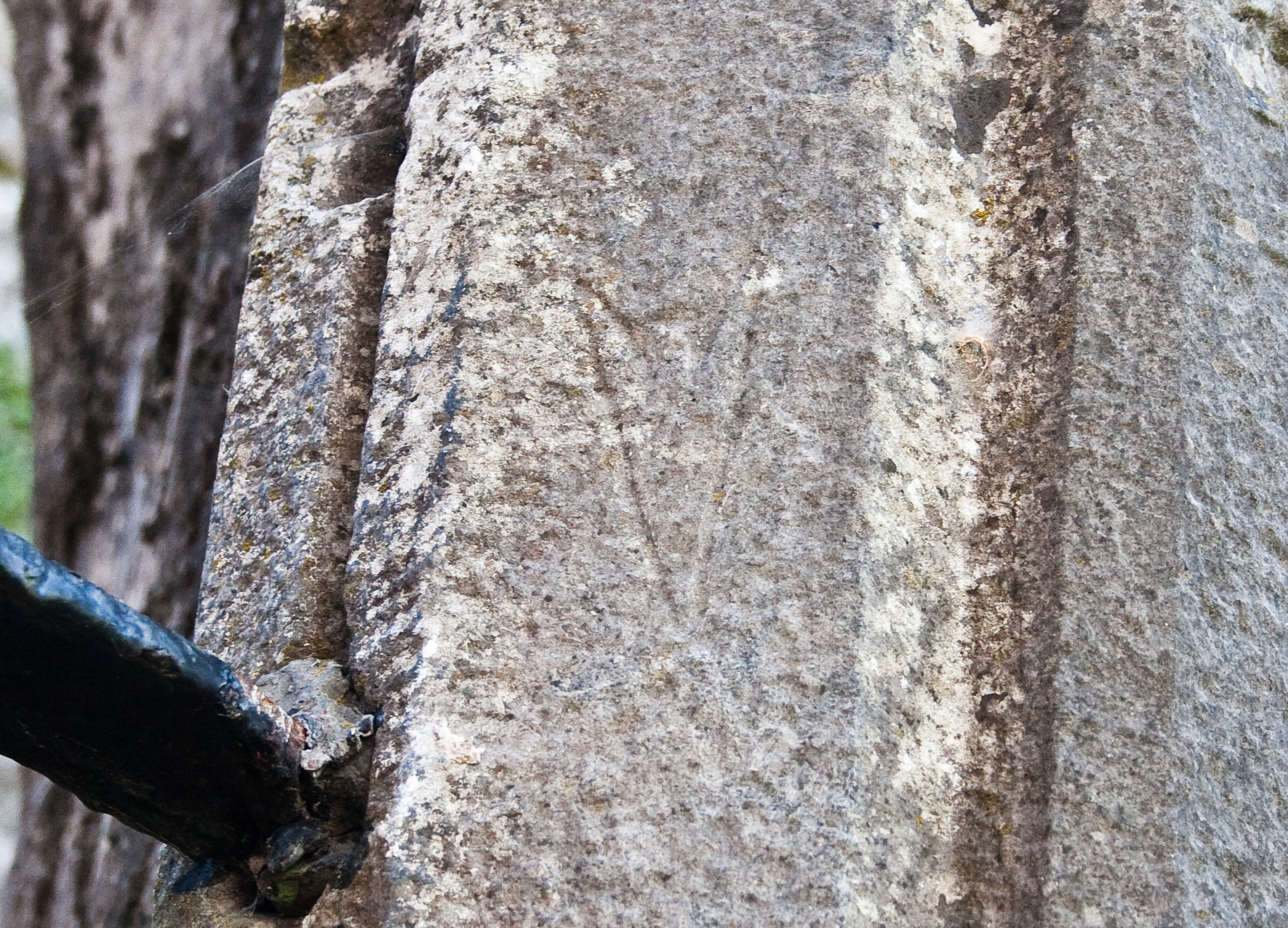
Arrowhead-shaped mason's mark in Athenry Priory, Ireland, 13th century

Mason's mark in the triforium of Wells Cathedral, England, late 12th or early 13th century

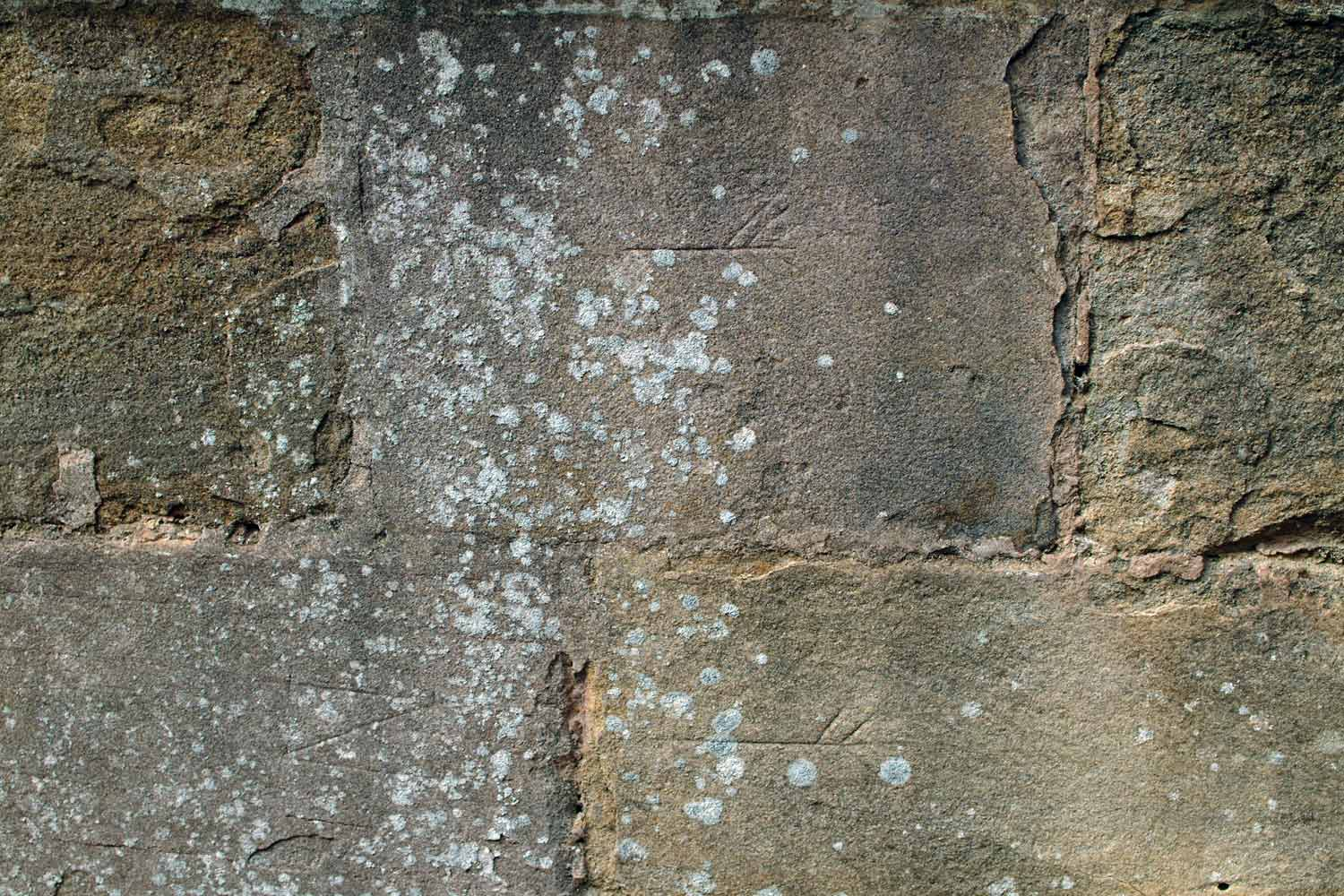
Mason's marks from Fountains Abbey, North Yorkshire, England

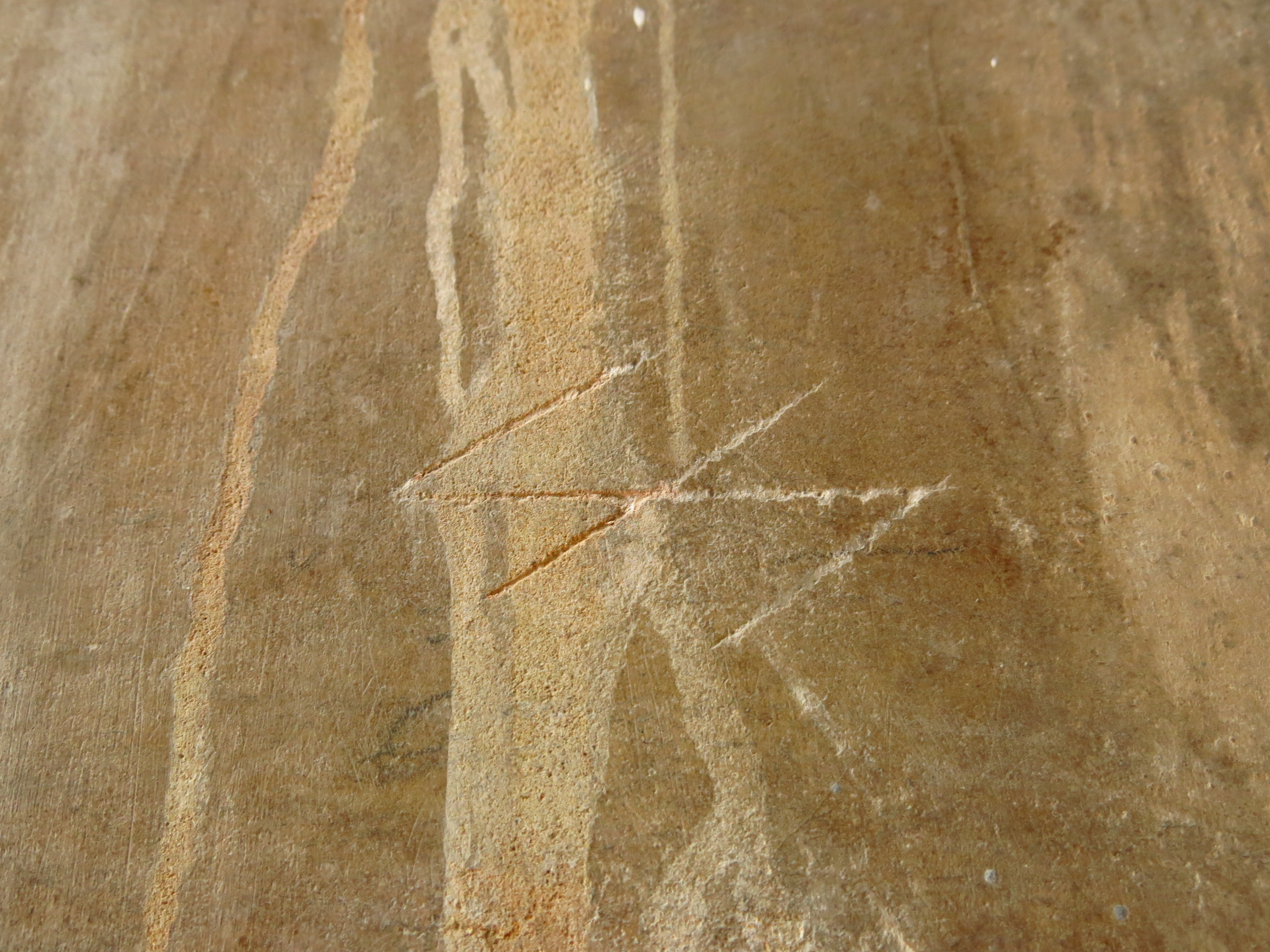
Horizontal Wolfsangel as a mason's mark, St Peter's Church, Walpole St Peter, Norfolk, England, 15th century

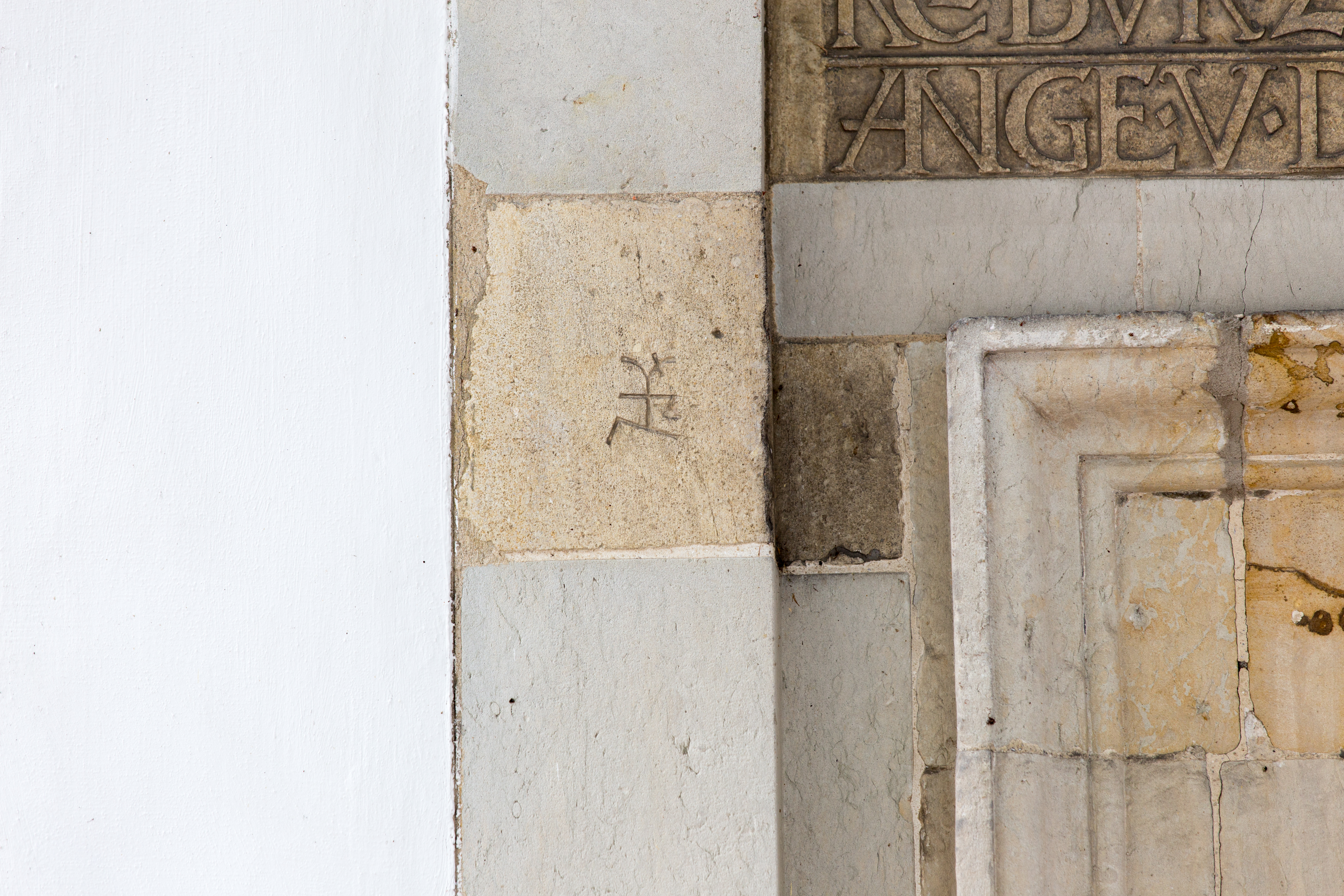
Mason's mark close to the Lintel at the Jagdschloss Grunewald, Germany

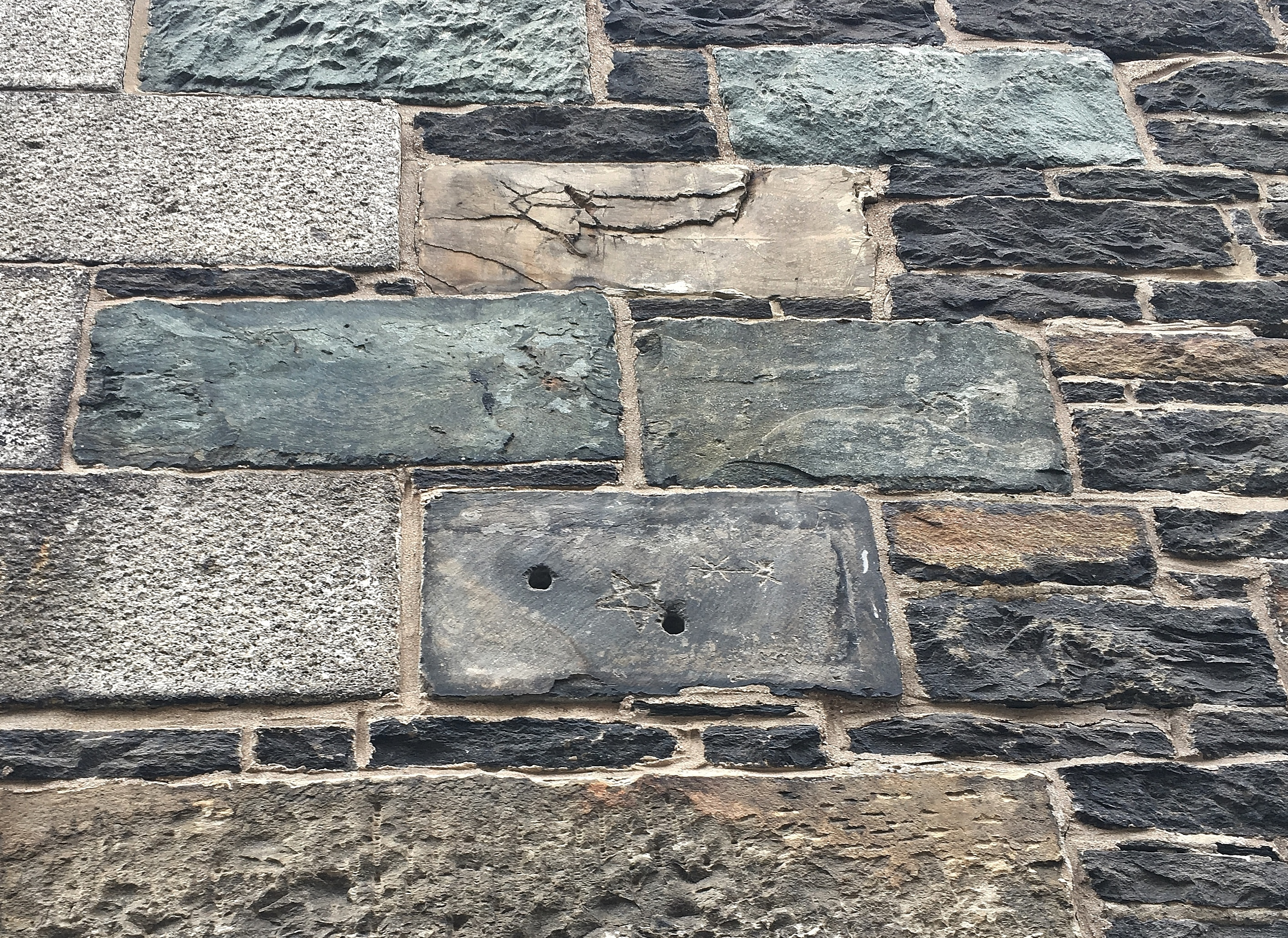
Mason's mark on Henry House in Halifax, Canada, from 1834

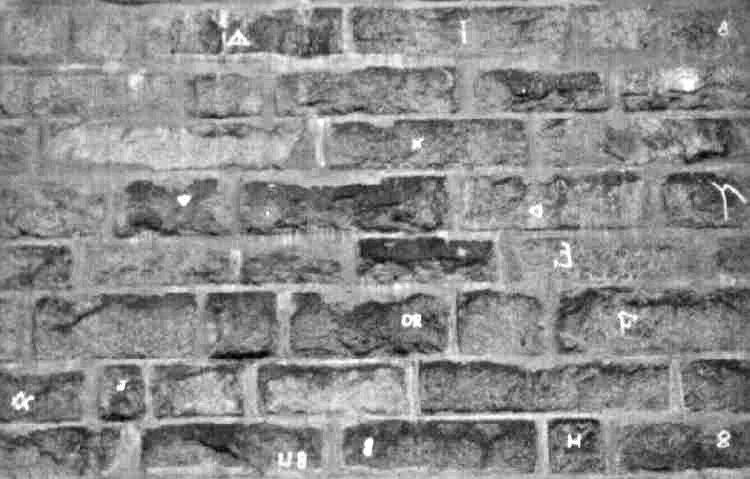
Mason's marks on the Canton Viaduct, Massachusetts, USA, 1834–1835

== See also ==
- Benchmark (surveying)
- Builder's signature
- Carpenter's mark
- House mark
- Merchant's mark
