= Henry House (Halifax, Nova Scotia) =

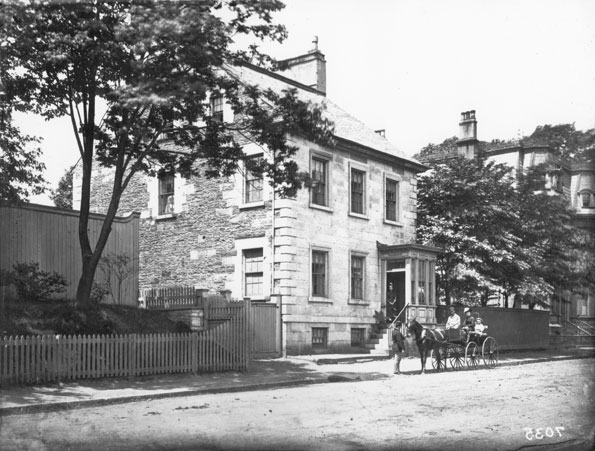
- Henry House c. 1879

- Location within Nova Scotia

General information
- Type: House
- Location: 1222 Barrington Street; Halifax, Nova Scotia; B3J 1Y4
- Coordinates: 44°38′25″N 63°34′15″W
- Current tenants: Henry House (restaurant)
- Completed: 1834

National Historic Site of Canada
- Official name: Henry House National Historic Site of Canada
- Designated: 1969

Nova Scotia Heritage Property Act
- Type: Provincially Registered Property
- Designated: 2005

Nova Scotia Heritage Property Act
- Type: Municipally Registered Property
- Designated: 1981

Henry House is a two-and-a-half-storey stone house located on Barrington Street in Halifax, Nova Scotia, Canada. The house is designated a National Historic Site, and is both a Provincially Registered Property and a Municipally Registered Property under the provincial Heritage Property Act.

== History ==
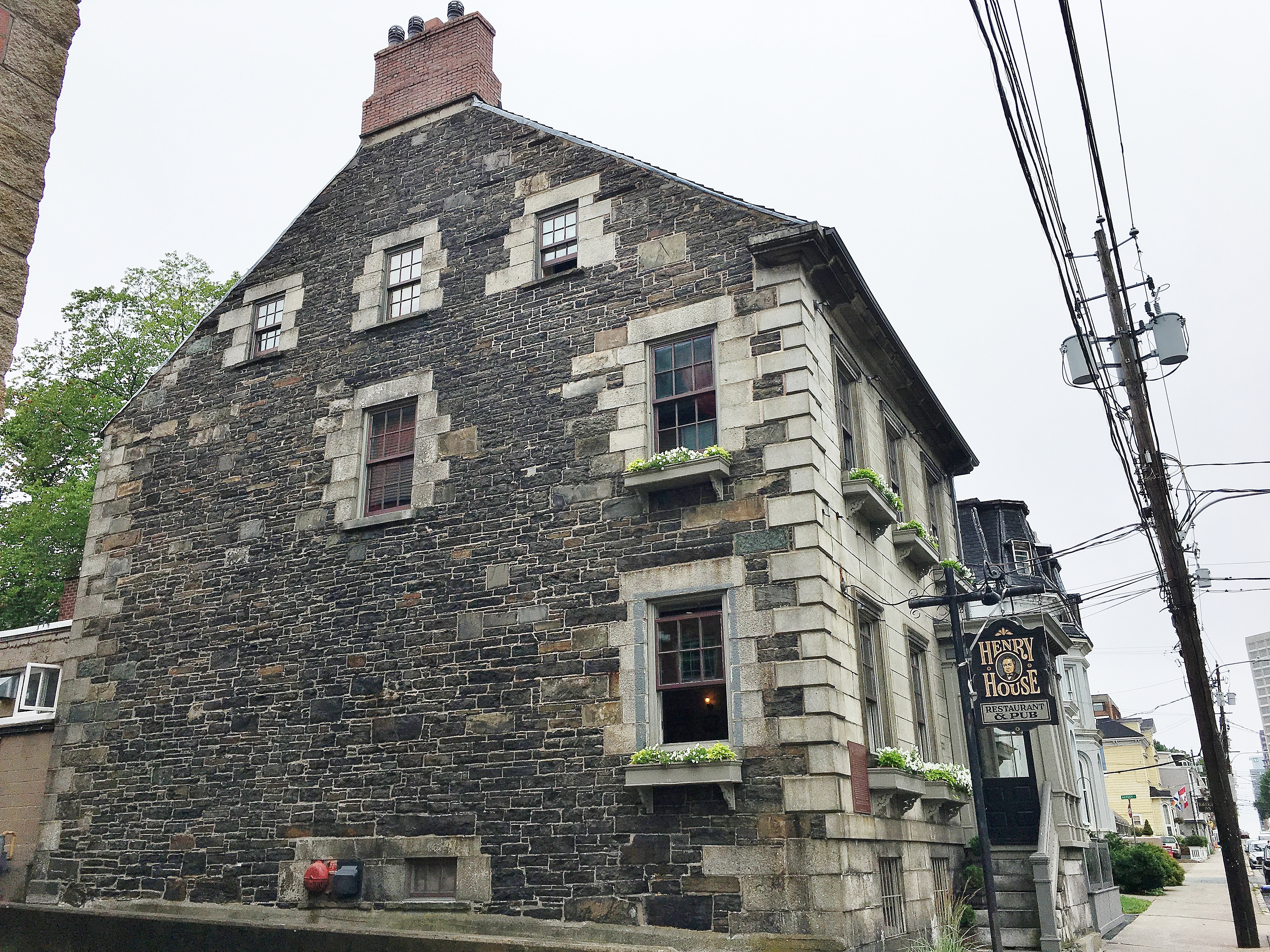
Henry House (August 2019)

The house was built in 1834 for John Metzler, a prosperous Halifax stonemason and landowner. It is primarily known for its association with William Alexander Henry, a prominent native of Halifax who resided here with his family from 1854 to 1864. Henry was a Father of Confederation, a co-author of the British North America Act, a provincial Attorney General, a Member of the Nova Scotia House of Assembly, a Mayor of Halifax and the first Nova Scotian to serve as a justice of the Supreme Court of Canada.

The building served as a Sailors' Home in the late 19th and early 20th centuries, operated by the Navy League of Canada (Halifax Branch). In 1968, it was sold to Richard (Dick) Raymond and Jacques Ducau, who did extensive renovations and opened The Henry House(restaurant) and Little Stone Jug (downstairs tavern) in 1969. (The Stone Jug is slang for prison and was previously the namesake of a Halifax pub on Brunswick St. in the nineteenth century.))

Since then the well-known restaurant has been in continuous operation, and it is still called The Henry House Restaurant & Pub.

The Henry House was designated a National Historic Site in 1969.

== Architecture ==
Henry House has a gable roof, and has ashlar granite facades with ironstone on the gable ends. The architecture is generally representative of a typical style used in early 19th-century British North America for elite residences. In particular, it is an excellent example of the Halifax House style, a design brought to Nova Scotia by Scottish masons and characterized by three bays and a side hall plan.

Mason's marks on the stone walls of Henry House:

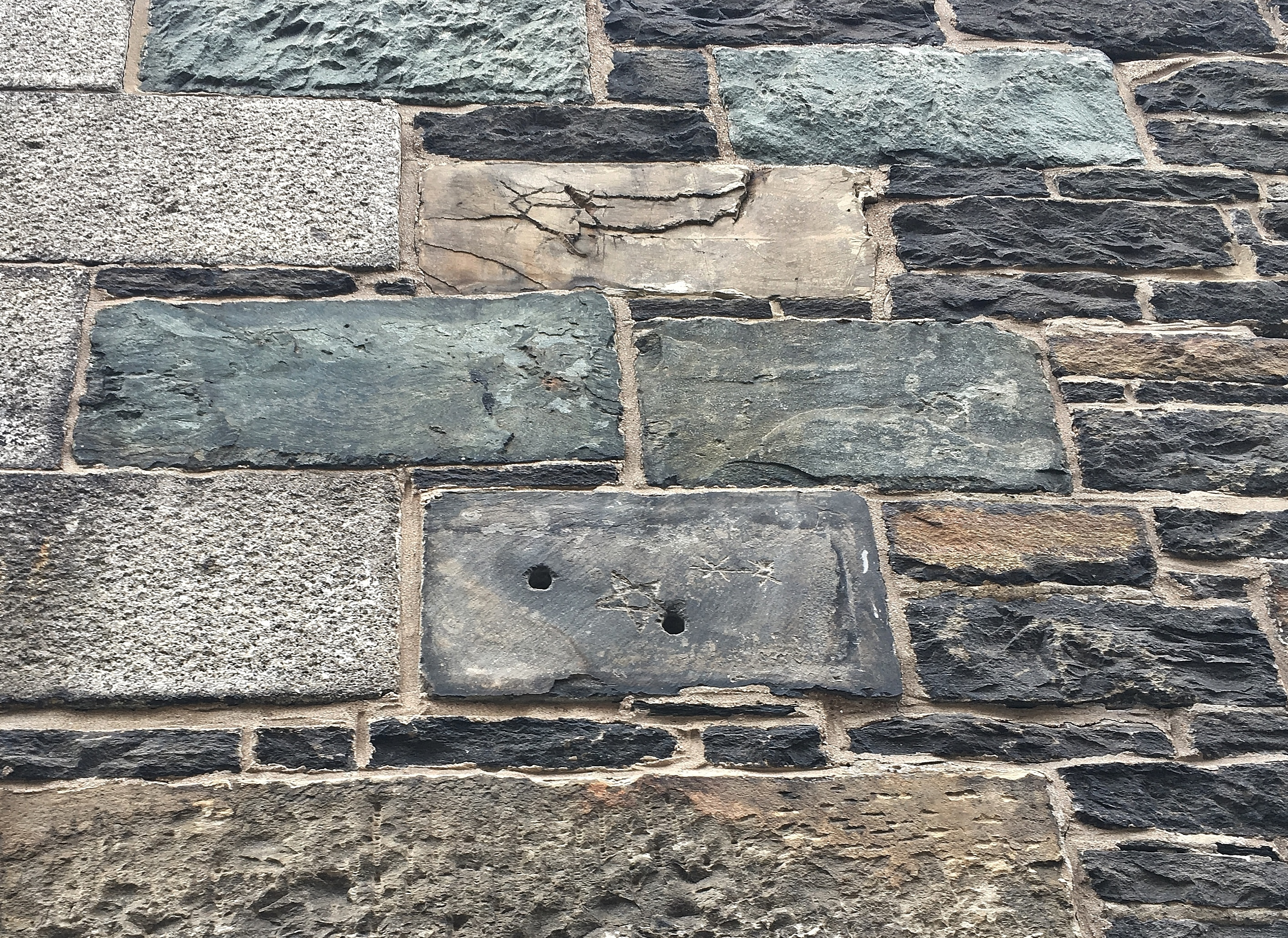

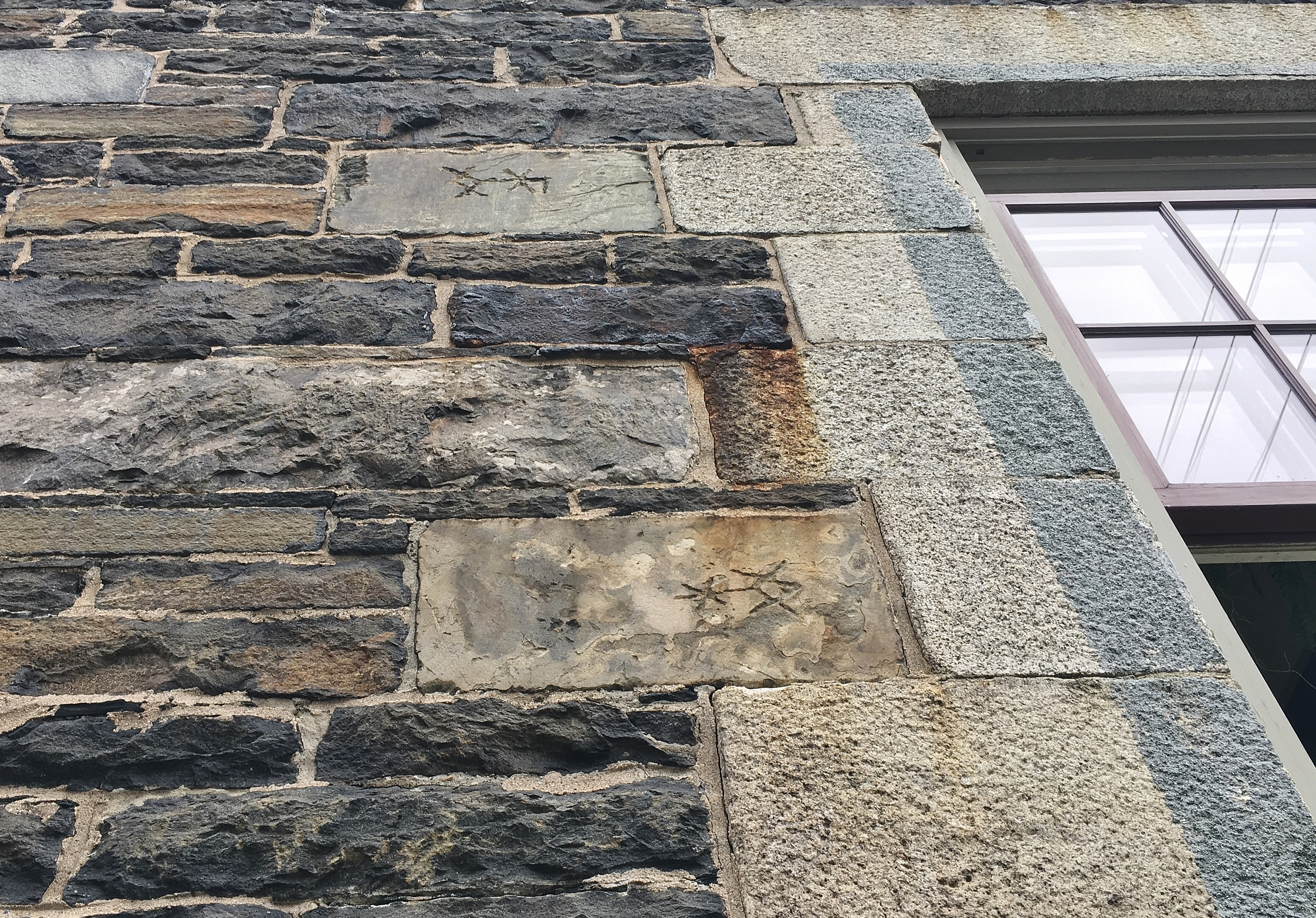

== See also ==
- List of oldest buildings and structures in Halifax, Nova Scotia
- List of historic places in the Halifax Regional Municipality
- List of National Historic Sites of Canada in Nova Scotia
