= Covenanter Church (Grand-Pré, Nova Scotia) =

Coordinates: 45°05′59″N 64°18′18″W

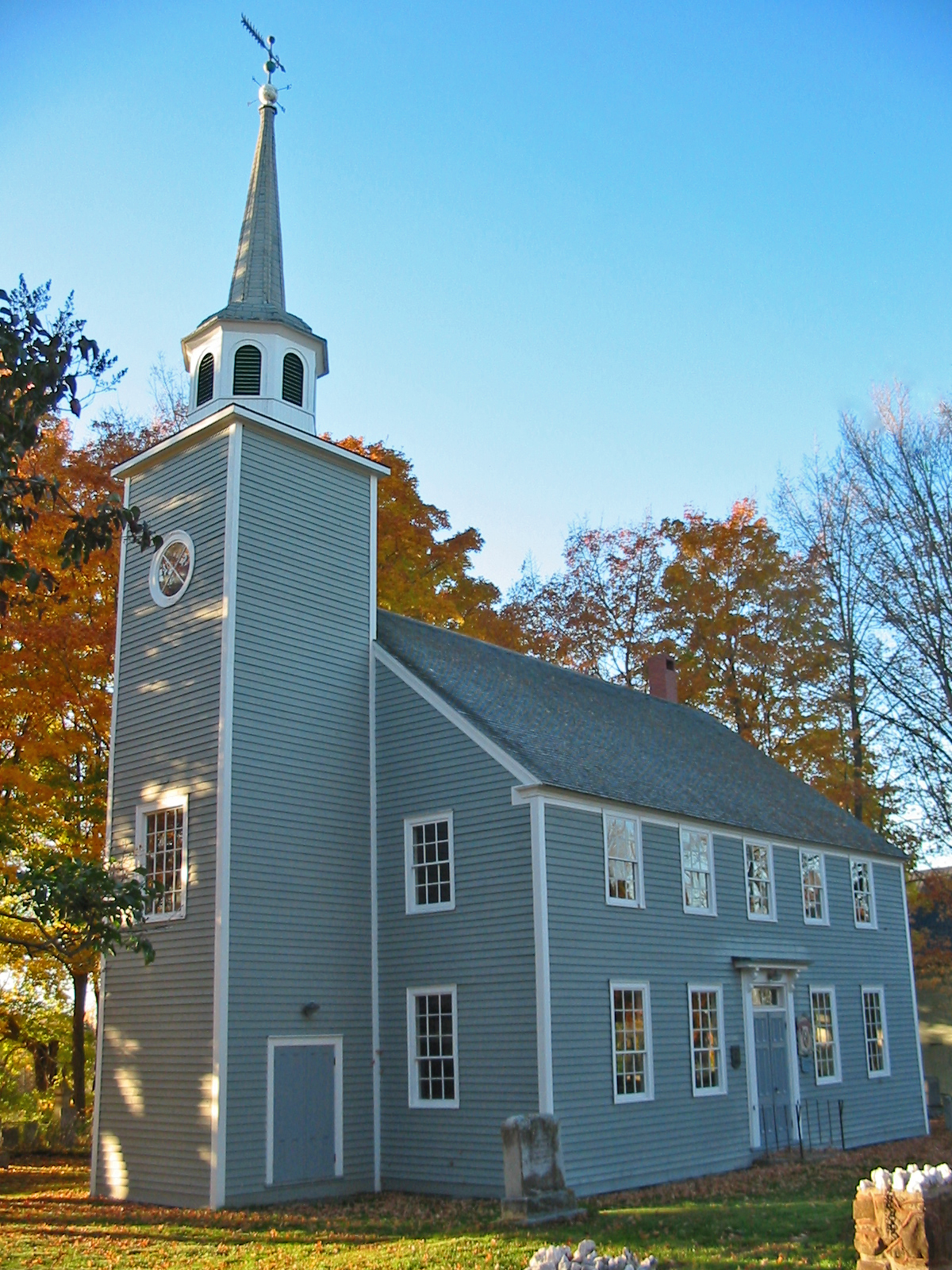
- Covenanter Church est. 1808, Grand Pre, Nova Scotia, Canada
- Covenanter Church
- Location: Grand-Pré, Nova Scotia

History
- Founder(s): Gillmore, George (Rev.)

Architecture
- Architect(s): Gillmore, George (Rev.)
- Style: New England Meeting House

National Historic Site of Canada
- Official name: Covenanters' Church National Historic Site of Canada
- Designated: 1976

Nova Scotia Heritage Property Act
- Type: Provincially Registered Property
- Designated: 1988
- Reference no.: 00PNS0073

Covenanter's Church is a New England meeting house style structure located in Grand Pré, Nova Scotia, and is the oldest extant Presbyterian Church in Canada. The meeting house was constructed between 1804 and 1811, with the tower, belfry, and steeple being added in 1818.

The meeting house was preceded by a small log church which was demolished in 1795 in anticipation of a larger construction. Under the leadership of Rev. George Gillmore, who had trained at the University of Edinburgh, a new church based on plain, meeting house lines was begun in 1804.

In 1833 the Rev. William Sommerville established a school and introduced a stricter regime; only allowing psalms to be sung as hymns and conducting prolonged services. The congregation was segregated during this time as well, with men sitting on one side of the church and women on the other. Sommerville and his successor, the Reverend Thomas McFall, were ordained pastors of the Reformed Presbyterian Church of Ireland. Members of this church called themselves 'Covenanters', as successors to those dissenters from the Church of Scotland. From the time this church became identified with this body, and other Presbyterian churches were built in the community, it has been referred to as the Covenanter Church.

From 1894 until its purchase by the Presbyterian Church of Canada in 1912, the church was vacant. The church then joined the United Church of Canada in 1925. Today, as a member of the Orchard Valley United Church pastoral charge, the Covenanter Church is used for services only during the summer months.

Adjacent to the church is a small, non-active cemetery where many of the founders of the community, including the Rev. George Gillmore, are buried. Others buried here include Andrew and Eunice (Laird) Borden, parents of Canada's eighth Prime Minister, Sir Robert Borden.

The church offers worship services during the months of July and August at 11:00 a.m., and an annual Christmas Eve service on December 24 at 11 p.m. Covenanter's Church was designated a National Historic Site of Canada in 1976, and was declared a Provincially Registered Historical Property in 1988.
