= Springhill Coal Mining National Historic Site =

Historic site in Springhill, Nova Scotia

Springhill Coal Mining
- Nova Scotia Coal Fields
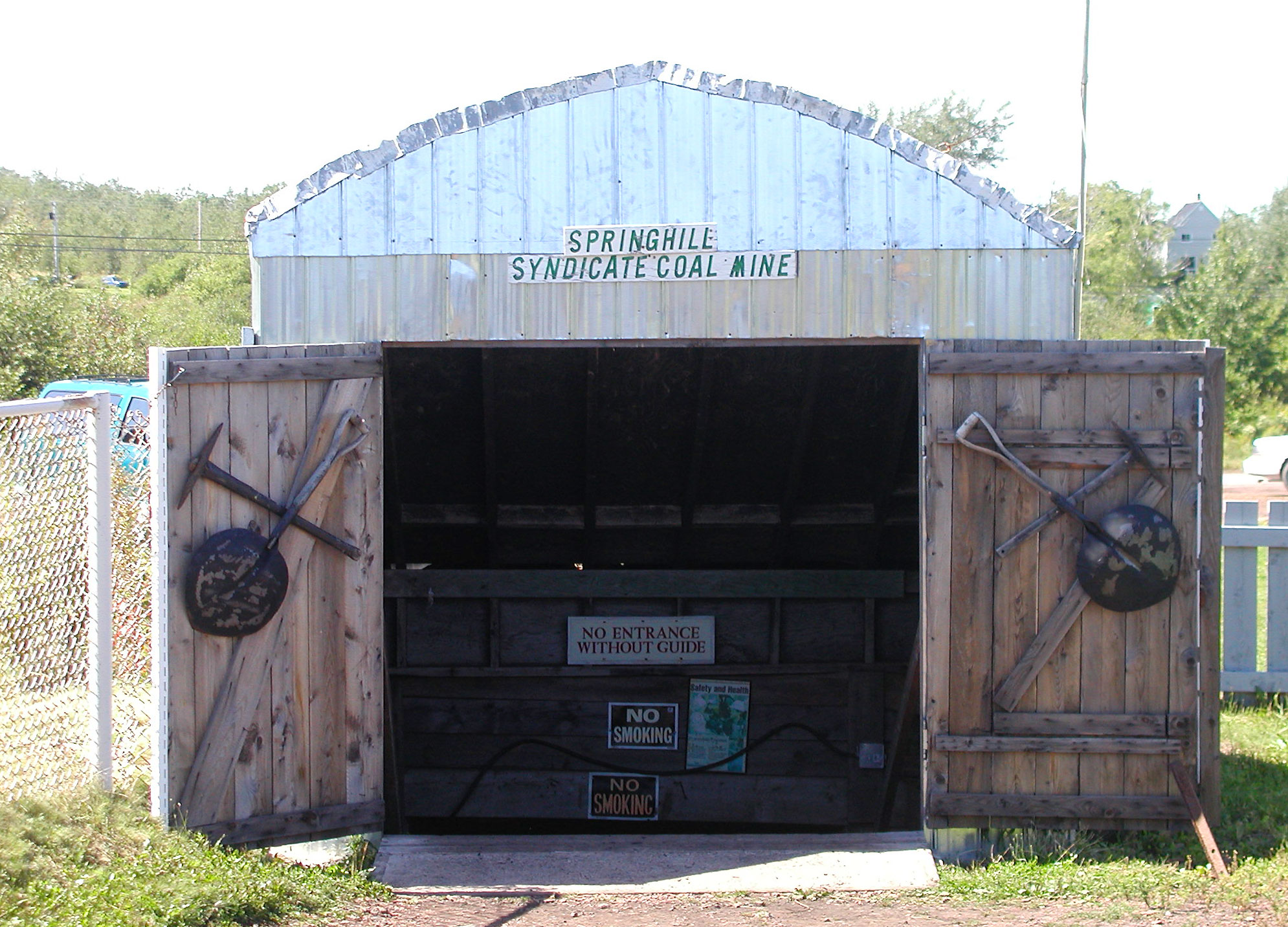
- An entrance to a Springhill mining shaft
- Location: Springhill, Nova Scotia, Canada
- Coordinates: 45°38′41″N 64°3′55″W
- Built: 1873
- Current use: Museum
- Governing body: Parks Canada

National Historic Site of Canada
- Official name: Springhill Coal Mining National Historic Site of Canada
- Designated: 12 March 1998

Springhill Coal Mining is a National Historic Site of Canada located on the corner of Industrial Park Drive and Memorial Crescent in Springhill, Nova Scotia. The Historic Site, designated in 1998, consists of a museum and the land that once contained the Springhill Coal Mines. Springhill was once one of the most important coalfields in Canada, along with those in Pictou and Cape Breton. Springhill coal was shipped and marketed throughout the Maritimes and Quebec. The surviving mining features in Springhill are among the most complete in Canada. The Springhill Mines were made infamous by a number of disasters that occurred underground, including the 1891 explosion, the 1956 explosion and the 1958 bump.

== History ==
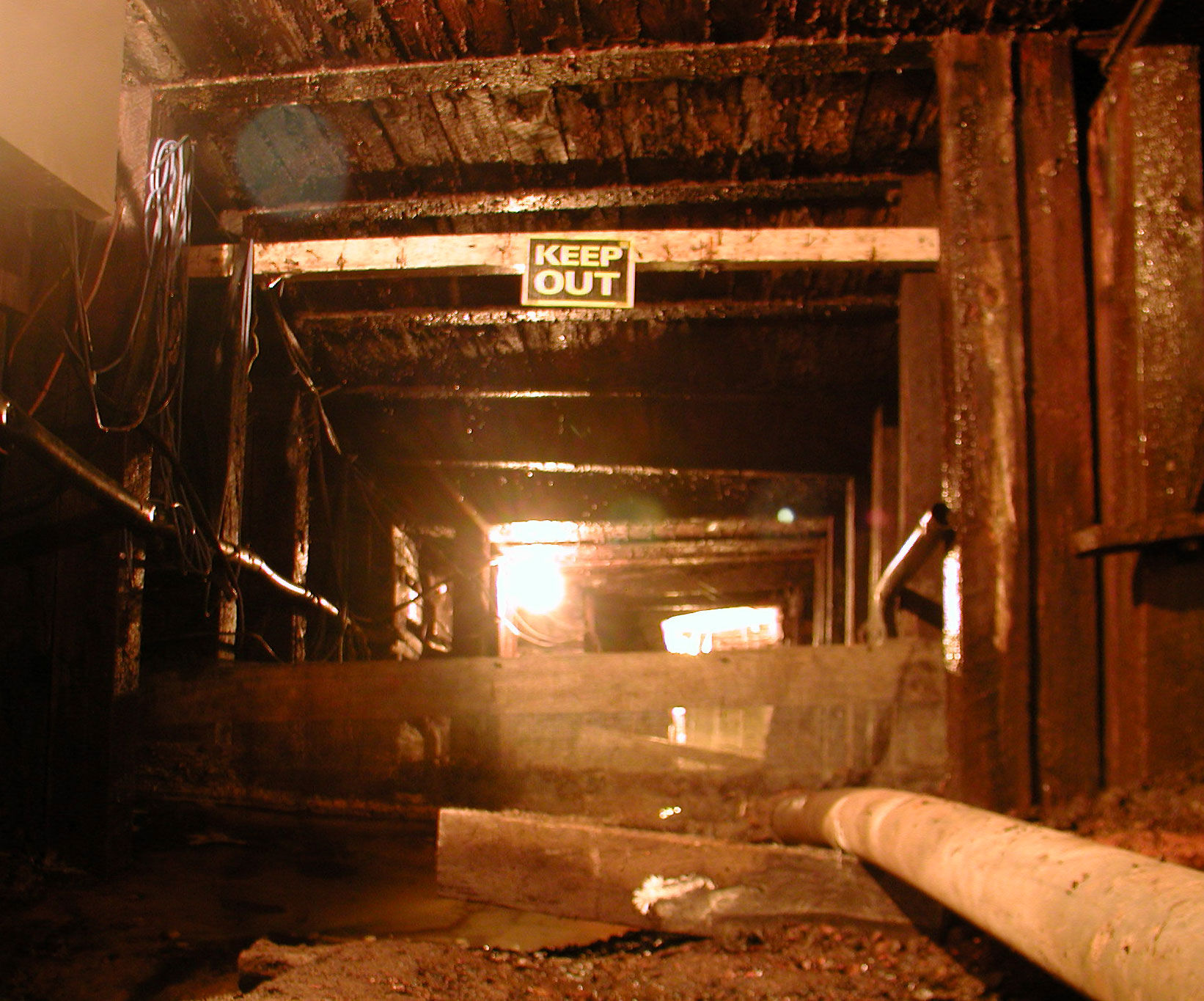
A mineshaft underground in Springhill

Springhill played a large part in the Nova Scotia coal mining boom from the 1870s to the 1940s. Springhill coal, along with coal from Pictou and Cape Breton, was shipped and sold throughout the Maritimes and Quebec, the revenue from which helped industrialize Nova Scotia's economy. Local mining operations were developed with the expansion of the Intercolonial Railway in the early 1900s, which spawned the Cumberland Coal Company. Mining operations depended heavily on highly skilled miners working in perilous underground conditions that were prone to explosions and underground earthquakes, as evidenced by the multiple disasters. In 1891 and 1956, coal dust explosions rocked the mine and resulted in many fatalities; in 1958 an underground earthquake, or "bump", caused sections of the mine to collapse. The site's historical value is due to Springhill's high importance in the industrialization of post-Confederation Nova Scotia and Canada in general. Nova Scotia was Canada's largest coal producer from 1867 until 1914, partially due to tariffs on foreign coal in Canada and the high demand for coal in other provinces in the late 1800s. After the two disasters in the 1950s, operations were downscaled and the mine officially closed in 1970. All that remains of the original mine is several brick buildings and the sealed pitheads for the No. 2 and No. 4 mines, with the Syndicate Mine entrance remaining open for the museum. The mine was designated a National Historic Site of Canada on March 12, 1998, along with the coal mining sites in Stellarton and Sydney, Nova Scotia.

== Museum ==
The National Historic Site is centred around a one-storey red brick building that was once used as a lamp cabin for the miners. The museum commemorates the tragedies of the mine and the heroics of the miners during the disasters as well as the history of prosperity brought by coal mining to Springhill. The museum offers tours of the wash house and the lamp cabin as well as a tour of a remaining part of the underground mine.
