= Knaut–Rhuland House =

Historic house in Lunenburg, Nova Scotia

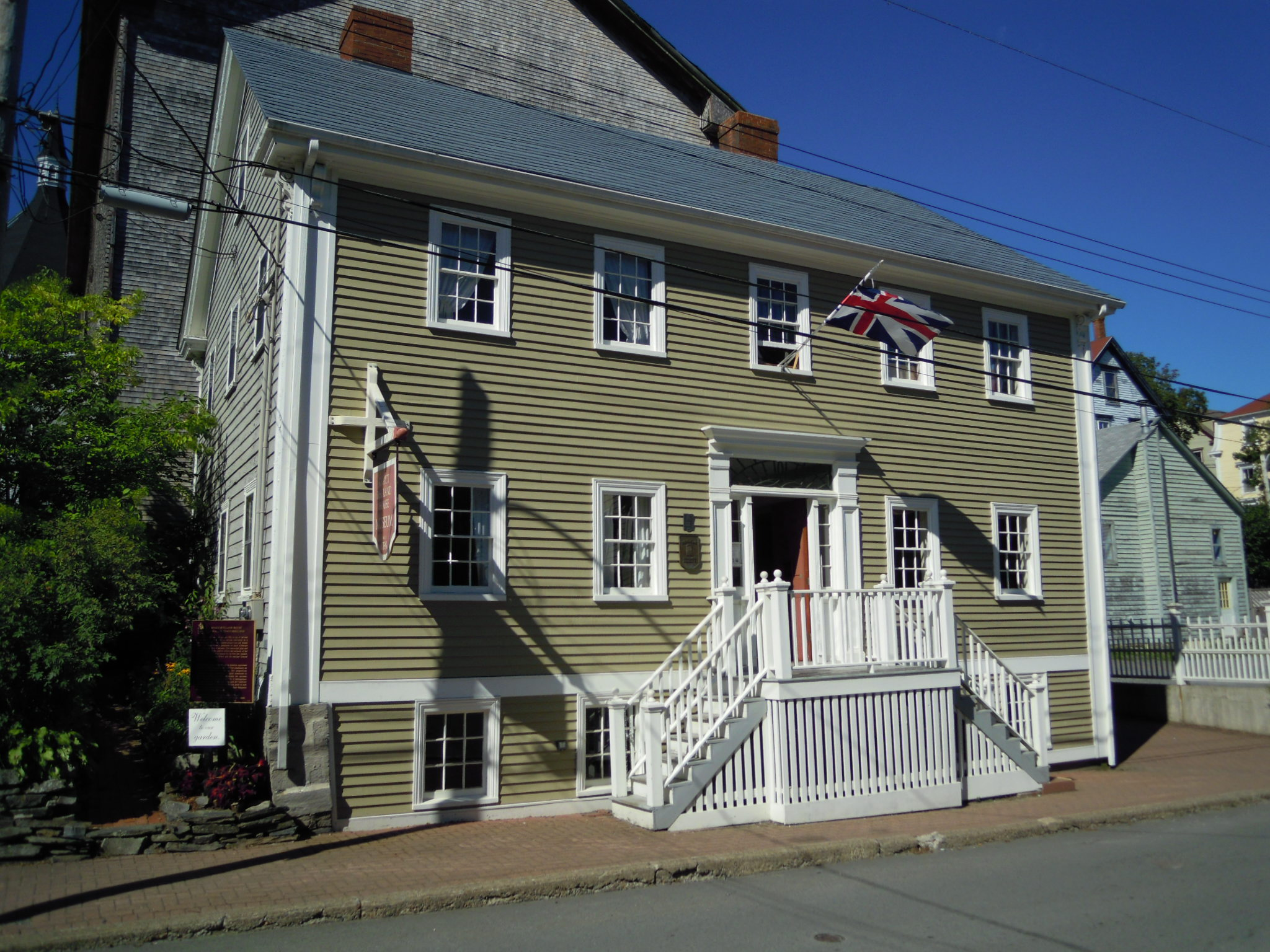
- Front facade of Knaut–Rhuland House

- Location within Nova Scotia

General information
- Type: House
- Location: 125 Pelham Street, Lunenburg, Nova Scotia, Canada
- Coordinates: 44°22′36.49″N 64°18′32.97″W
- Current tenants: Knaut–Rhuland House Museum
- Completed: 1793

National Historic Site of Canada
- Official name: Knaut–Rhuland House National Historic Site of Canada
- Designated: 2002

Nova Scotia Heritage Property Act
- Type: Provincially Registered Property
- Designated: 1989

Knaut–Rhuland House is a historic 18th-century house in Lunenburg, Nova Scotia, Canada. It is a designated a National Historic Site of Canada, as well as a Provincially Registered Property under the provincial Heritage Property Act. It is located within the Old Town Lunenburg World Heritage Site. The Knaut–Rhuland House is owned by the Lunenburg Heritage Society, which operates a museum in the house open to the public during the summer.

== History ==
The house is named for its first two owners. The first owner, Benjamin Knaut, had the house built in 1793. Benjamin was one of the town's first sheriffs, a trader and a privateer. The second owner, Conrad Rhuland, was also a trader and ship owner and during the War of 1812 was a privateer's prize master.

== Description ==
The houses' design is British Classicism. The entrance door is framed by sidelights and there is a transom window overhead. All windows are multi - paned six over six and many have the original old glass.

The foundation is stone, more than two feet thick, and is built around two chimneys.

The frame is post and beam, consisting of hand-hewn timbers. These are "numbered" with hatch marks suggesting that it was prepared off-site. The interior walls and ceilings were plastered (reinforced with horse hair) and applied to split lath. The floors are pine and there are seven fireplaces. There are original mouldings and wood work in some rooms.

There are furnished rooms on the ground floor providing examples of the style of furnishings that would be known to the first two owners. An exhibition called "Our Spiritual Heritage" contains a display of old Bibles and prayer books, some dating from the time of the "Foreign Protestants" who came to Lunenburg in 1753. This exhibition contains display panels describing Lunenburg's churches, which are amongst the oldest in Canada. There is also a room depicting the craft activities of the 18th and 19th centuries, with among other items a walking wheel, spinning wheels and wool winders.

Upstairs, the exhibition gallery provides a history of Lunenburg from 1753 when the Foreign Protestants settled in the town and local area.

== Exhibit ==
The Knaut–Rhuland House also has a room containing artefacts from the Victorian period and a costume gallery with displays of original and replica clothing, and a small garden that includes plants that would have been used by the early owners of the house to dye fabric.
