= Argyle Township Court House & Gaol =

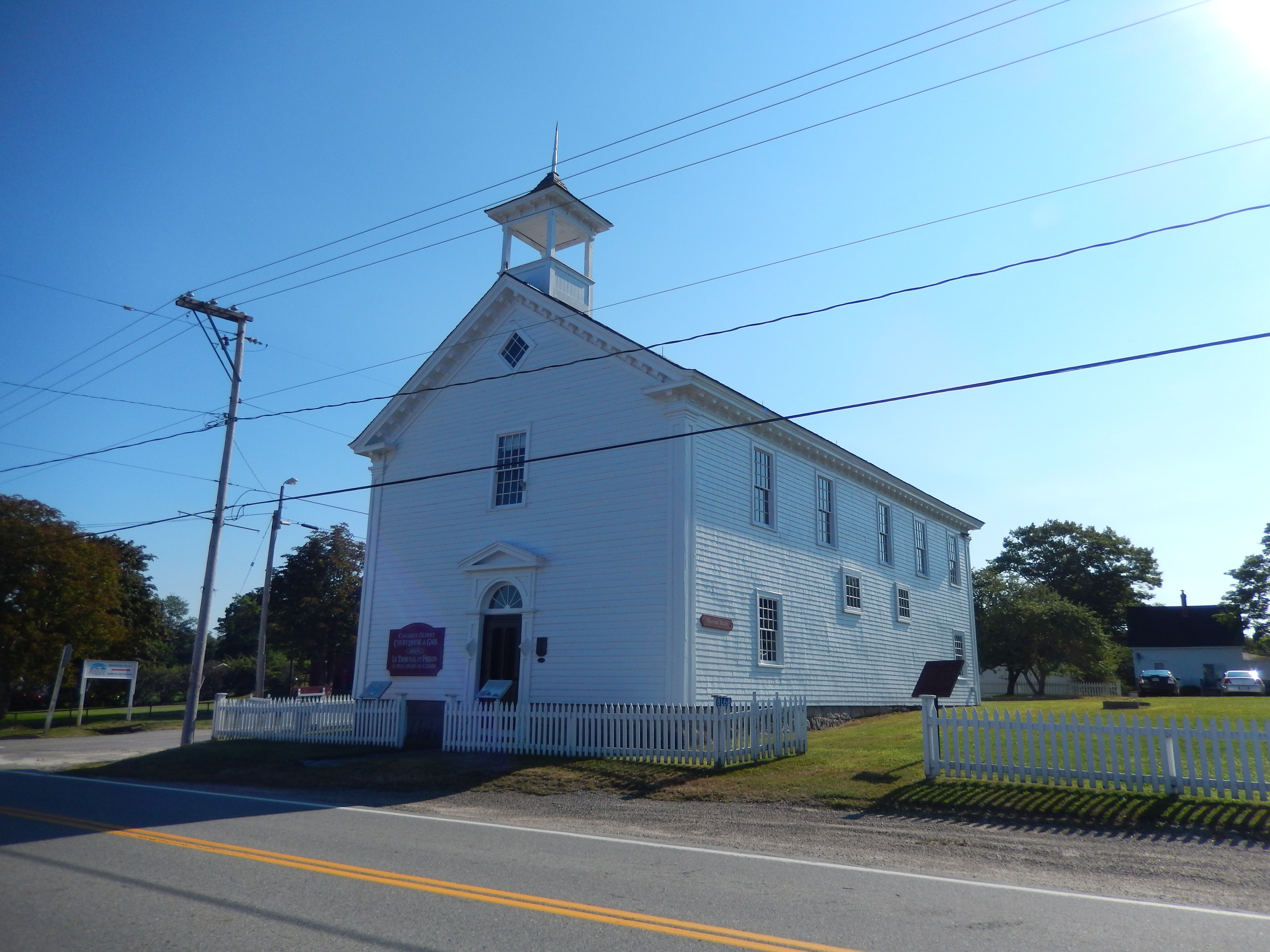

General information
- Status: Used as a museum
- Type: Government
- Architectural style: Greek Revival
- Location: 8168 Hwy #3, Tusket, Canada
- Coordinates: 43.8549°N 65.9745°W
- Construction started: 1801
- Completed: 1805
- Owner: Municipality of the District of Argyle & AMHGS (current)

The Argyle Township Court House & Gaol is a provincially and federally recognised heritage building along Route 308 in the present-day community of Tusket, Nova Scotia. Predating Canadian Confederation, it played a significant role in the administrative, judicial, and political spheres of life in the Municipality of the District of Argyle during the 19th and early 20th centuries. Also known as the Tusket Court House, the building is held to be "the oldest surviving combined court house and jail in Canada." No longer an active court house, the local landmark now serves as a museum and tourist destination.

== History ==
Construction of the court house was initiated in 1801, taking place over a period of nearly five years, and ending in 1805 with the first sitting of the Court of the General Sessions of the Peace being held on 29 October.

An historical marker was erected in 2008 on Courthouse Road in Tusket explaining that this is Canada's Oldest courthouse. The historical marker also presents information about Emilie Doucette, an Acadian from nearby Hubbard's Point who was the first female municipal councillor in the Municipality of Argyle.

== The trial of Omar Pasha Roberts ==
During a Supreme Court sitting at Tusket in 1922, presided over by Sir J.A. Chisholm, Omar Pasha Roberts was found guilty of the murder of Miss Flora Gray of Kemptville, Nova Scotia, and subsequently sentenced to hang for the crime.

== Museum & Archives ==
In 1983, the Argyle Township Court House Archives were formed, becoming the "first Municipal archives in Nova Scotia."
