= List of Nova Scotia provincial highways =

Nova Scotia provincial highway system
- Standard highway markers for Nova Scotia

Highway names
- Arterial (100-series) highways: Nova Scotia Highway 1XX (Hwy 1XX)
- Trunk Highways: Nova Scotia Trunk XX (Trunk XX)
- Collector Highways: Nova Scotia Route XXX (Route XXX)

System links
- Provincial highways in Nova Scotia; 100-series

This is a list of numbered highways in the province of Nova Scotia.

== Arterial highways ==
A 100-series highway is a designation applied to a highway that can be a controlled-access expressway, Super-2, or fully divided freeway. The designation can also be applied in some cases to sections of uncontrolled access roads which are deemed strategically important and which will be upgraded in the future to controlled-access.

== Trunk Highways ==
Nova Scotia's original arterial highway number system had route number signs in the same shape as the U.S. Highway shields. These signs are now used for Trunk routes. Former, "missing", Trunk routes were largely downgraded to Collector Routes in 1969.

Number	Length (km)	Length (mi)	Southern or western terminus	Northern or eastern terminus	Local names	Formed	Removed	Notes
Trunk 1	327.5	203.5	Yarmouth Ferry Terminal in Yarmouth	Trunk 2 in Bedford	Evangeline Trail	—	—	Passes through Lower Sackville, Windsor, the Annapolis Valley, and Digby.
Trunk 2	266.0	165.3	Hwy 102 in Halifax	Hwy 104 (TCH) in Fort Lawrence		—	—	Passes through Bedford, Lower Sackville, Truro, Parrsboro, and Amherst.
Trunk 2A	23	14	Trunk 2 in Southampton	Trunk 2 in Upper Nappan		—	—	Former section of Trunk 2; replaced by Route 302.
Trunk 3	291.3	181.0	Trunk 1 in Yarmouth	Halifax		—	—	Passes through Liverpool, Bridgewater, and Lunenburg.
Trunk 3A	15	9.3	Trunk 3 in Bridgewater	Trunk 3 in Mahone Bay		—	—	Deviation of Trunk 3 that completely circumvents the First and Kingsburg Peninsulas to go directly between Mahone Bay and Bridgewater. Replaced by Route 325 and rendered partly obsolete by Highway 103.
Trunk 4	414.6	257.6	Hwy 104 (TCH) near Thomson Station	Trunk 28 in Glace Bay		—	—	Passes through Truro, New Glasgow, Antigonish, and Sydney. Largely unsigned near Truro, possibly to lure traffic onto the superseding highway.
Trunk 5	165	103	Trunk 4 / Trunk 19 in Port Hastings	Sydney		—	—	Replaced by Hwy 105, with some bypassed sections re-designated as Route 205 and Route 305 or as unnumbered, local roads.
Trunk 6	136.4	84.8	Hwy 104 (TCH) in Amherst	Hwy 106 (TCH) in Pictou		—	—	
Trunk 7	278.2	172.9	Trunk 2 in Bedford	Trunk 4 in Antigonish		—	—	Passes through Dartmouth, Musquodoboit Harbour, and Sheet Harbour.
Trunk 8	112.9	70.2	Trunk 3 in Liverpool	Trunk 1 in Annapolis Royal	Kejimkujik Scenic Drive	—	—	Connects to Kejimkujik National Park.
Trunk 9	59	37	Apple River	Trunk 2 in Parrsboro		—	—	Replaced by Route 209.
Trunk 10	88.2	54.8	Route 325 in Bridgewater	Trunk 1 in Middleton		—	—	
Trunk 11	49	30	Trunk 4 in Truro	Trunk 6 in Tatamagouche		—	—	Replaced by Route 311.
Trunk 12	65.6	40.8	Trunk 3 in Chester Basin	Trunk 1 in Kentville		—	—	
Trunk 14	120.7	75.0	Trunk 3 near Chester	Trunk 2 in Milford Station		—	—	Passes through Windsor.
Trunk 15	120.0	74.6	Trunk 4 in Newport Corner	Trunk 2 in Shubenacadie		—	—	Replaced by Route 215.
Trunk 16	79.2	49.2	Trunk 4 in Monastery	Canso		—	—	
Trunk 17	64	40	Trunk 1 in Digby	Westport, Brier Island		—	—	Replaced by Route 217.
Trunk 18	11	6.8	Trunk 7 in Dartmouth	Trunk 2 in Waverley		—	—	Replaced by Route 318.
Trunk 19	106.6	66.2	Hwy 104 (TCH) / Hwy 105 (TCH) / Trunk 4 in Port Hastings	Cabot Trail at Margaree Forks	Ceilidh Trail	—	—	
Trunk 19	85	53	Trunk 5 in Port Hastings	Trunk 5 in Baddeck		—	1940s	Trunk 5 and Trunk 19 designations were switched between Port Hastings and Baddeck.
Trunk 20	56	35	Trunk 7 at Melrose	Trunk 4 in Antigonish		—	1940s	Replaced by Trunk 7; proposed section of Trunk 7 between Melrose and Trunk 16 was not constructed.
Trunk 20	2	1.2	Trunk 4 at Grande Anse	Louisdale		—	—	Replaced by Route 320; Route 320 was subsequently relocated with the completion of Hwy 104.
Trunk 21	38	24	Trunk 4 in Oxford	Trunk 6 in Port Philip		—	—	Replaced by Route 321.
Trunk 22	35.6	22.1	Trunk 4 in Sydney	Louisbourg	Mira Road	—	—	
Trunk 23	72	45	Trunk 5 at Aberdeen	Trunk 5 at Leitches Creek Station		—	—	Replaced by Route 223.
Trunk 26	—	—	Trunk 2 in Athol	Springhill		—	1938	Section between Springhill and Little Forks was replaced by Trunk 2, the remainder was decommissioned as is known as Little Forks Road; bypassed section of Trunk 2 was replaced by Route 302.
Trunk 28	35.6	22.1	Trunk 4 in Sydney	Trunk 4 / Route 255 in Glace Bay		—	—	
Trunk 30	298	185	Hwy 105 (TCH) at South Haven	Hwy 105 (TCH) at Buckwheat Corner	Cabot Trail	—	—	Trunk 30 is unsigned; Passes through Cape Breton Highlands National Park.
Trunk 30	17	11	Trunk 3 in Barrington Passage	Lower Clarks Harbour, Cape Sable Island		—	—	Replaced by Route 330.
Trunk 31	56	35	Trunk 3 in Mill Village	Trunk 3 in Bridgewater		—	—	Replaced by Route 331.
Trunk 32	4.6	2.9	Route 306 in Halifax	Main Avenue in Halifax	• Dunbrack Street • North West Arm Drive (former)	—	—	Trunk 32 is unsigned.
Trunk 32	36	22	Trunk 3 in Upper LaHave	Trunk 3 in Lunenburg		—	—	Replaced by Route 332.
Trunk 33	4.7	2.9	Hwy 101 / Trunk 1 in Lower Sackville	Trunk 7 in Bedford	Bedford Bypass	—	—	Trunk 33 is unsigned.
Trunk 33	63	39	Trunk 3 in Upper Tantallon	Trunk 3 in Beechville		—	—	Replaced by Route 333.
Trunk 34	20	12	Lower Wedgeport	Trunk 3 in Arcadia		—	—	Replaced by Route 334.
Trunk 35	14	8.7	Lower West Pubnico	Trunk 3 in Pubnico		—	—	Replaced by Route 335.
Trunk 40	80	50	Trunk 1 in Hebron	Trunk 1 in Weymouth		—	—	Replaced by Route 340.
Trunk 41	19	12	Trunk 1 in Kentville	Kingsport		—	—	Replaced by Route 341 (Kentville – Canard), Route 358 (Canard – Canning), and Route 221 (Canning – Kingsport).
Trunk 44	6	3.7	Mulgrave	Trunk 4 in Aulds Cove		1955	1970	Former Trunk 4 to Mulgrave–Port Hawkesbury ferry (ferry replaced by Canso Causeway); replaced by Route 344.
Trunk 45	63	39	Trunk 4 in Sutherlands River	Trunk 4 / Trunk 7 in Antigonish		—	—	Replaced by Route 245.
Trunk 66	47	29	Trunk 6 in East Amherst	Trunk 6 in Port Howe		—	—	Replaced by Route 366.
Former

== Collector Highways ==
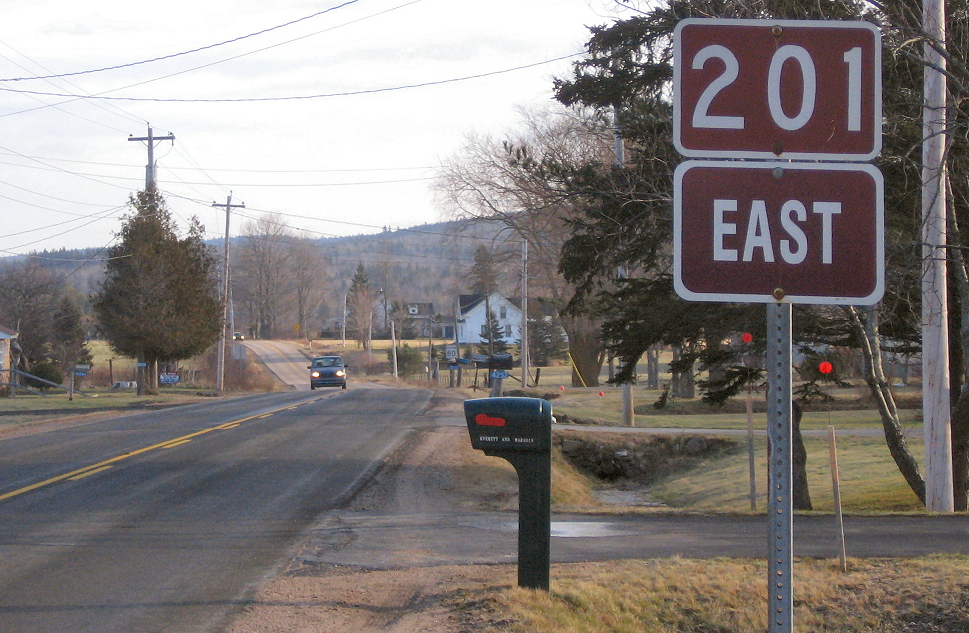
View of Route 201 outside of Bridgetown.

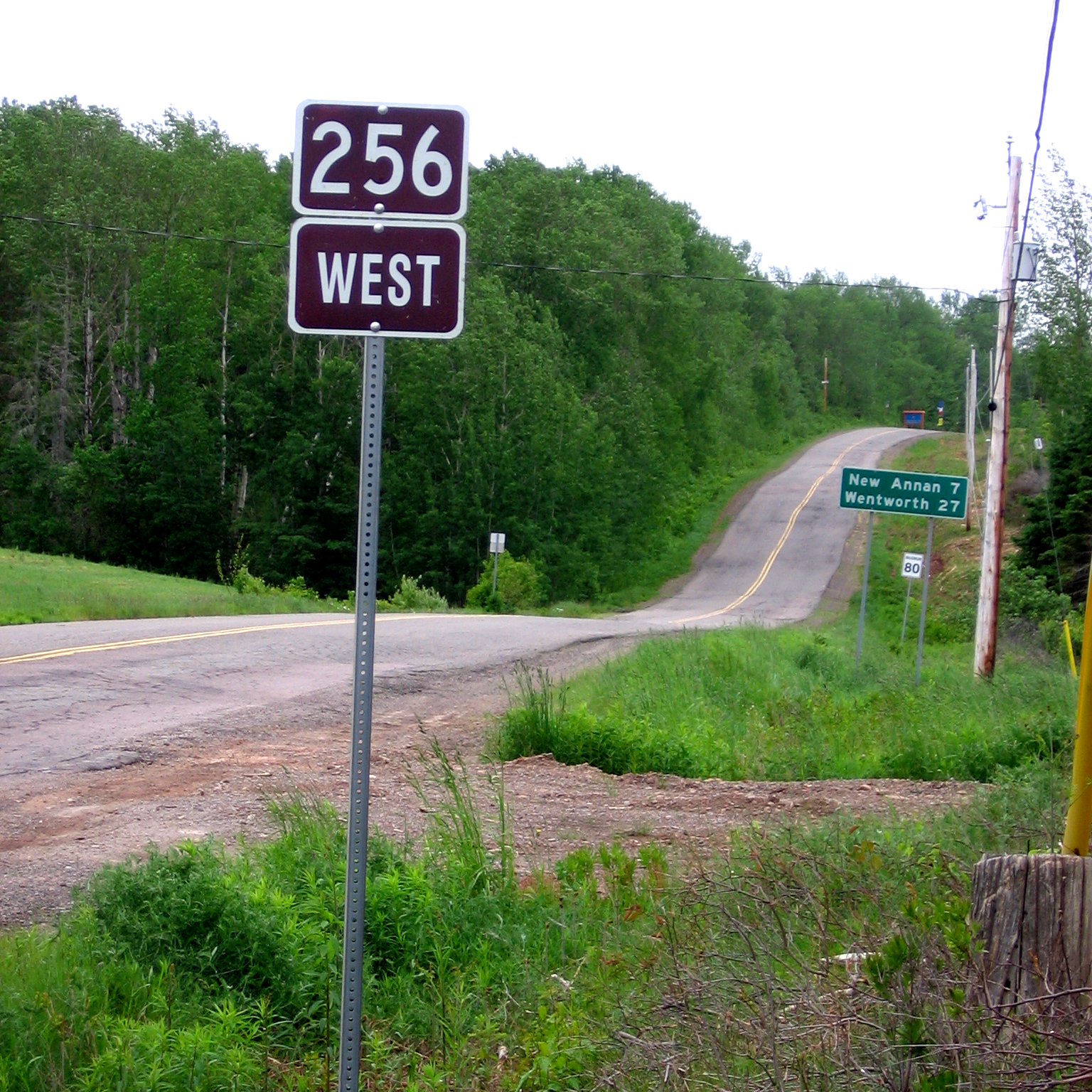
Start of Route 256 in West New Annan.

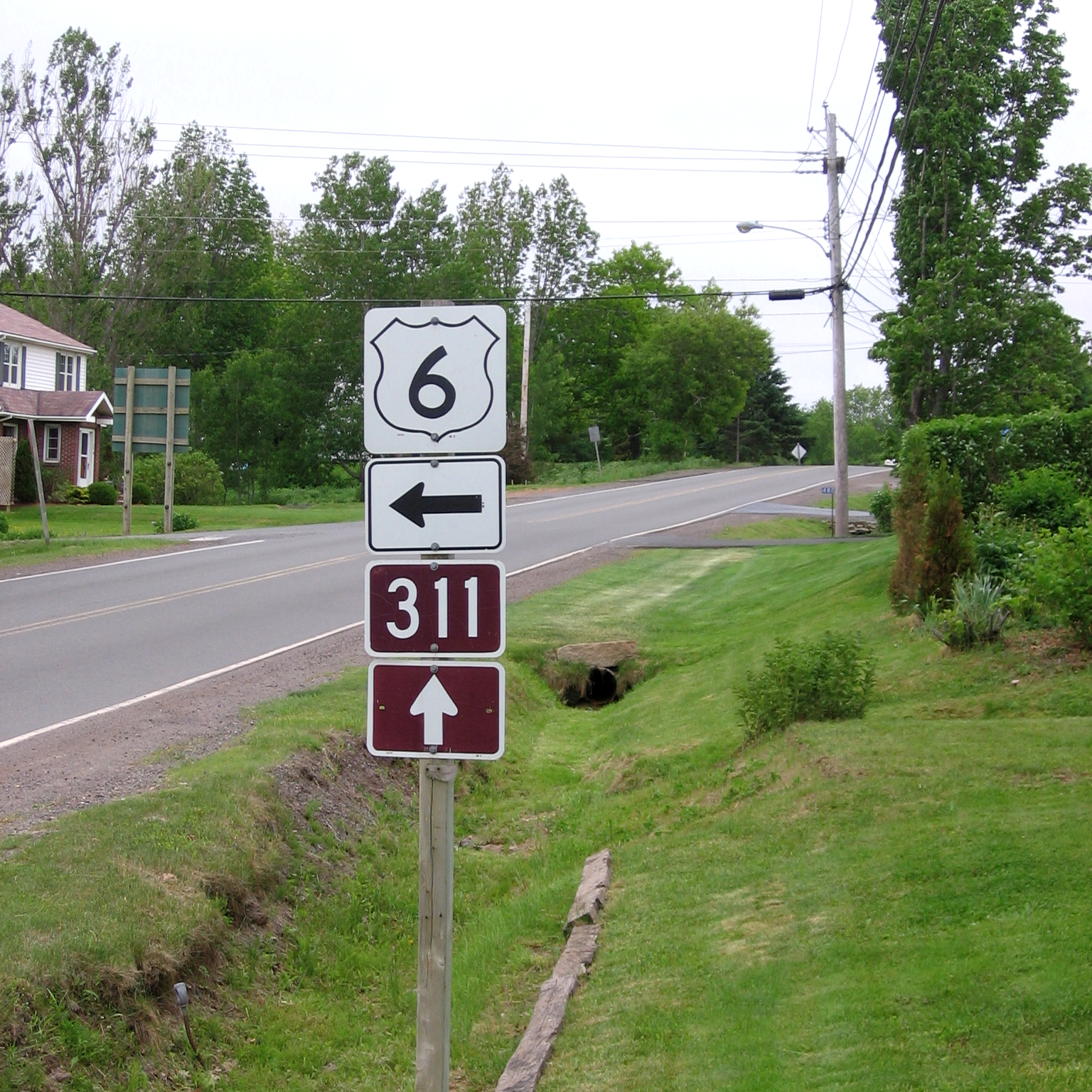
Start of Route 311 in Tatamagouche.

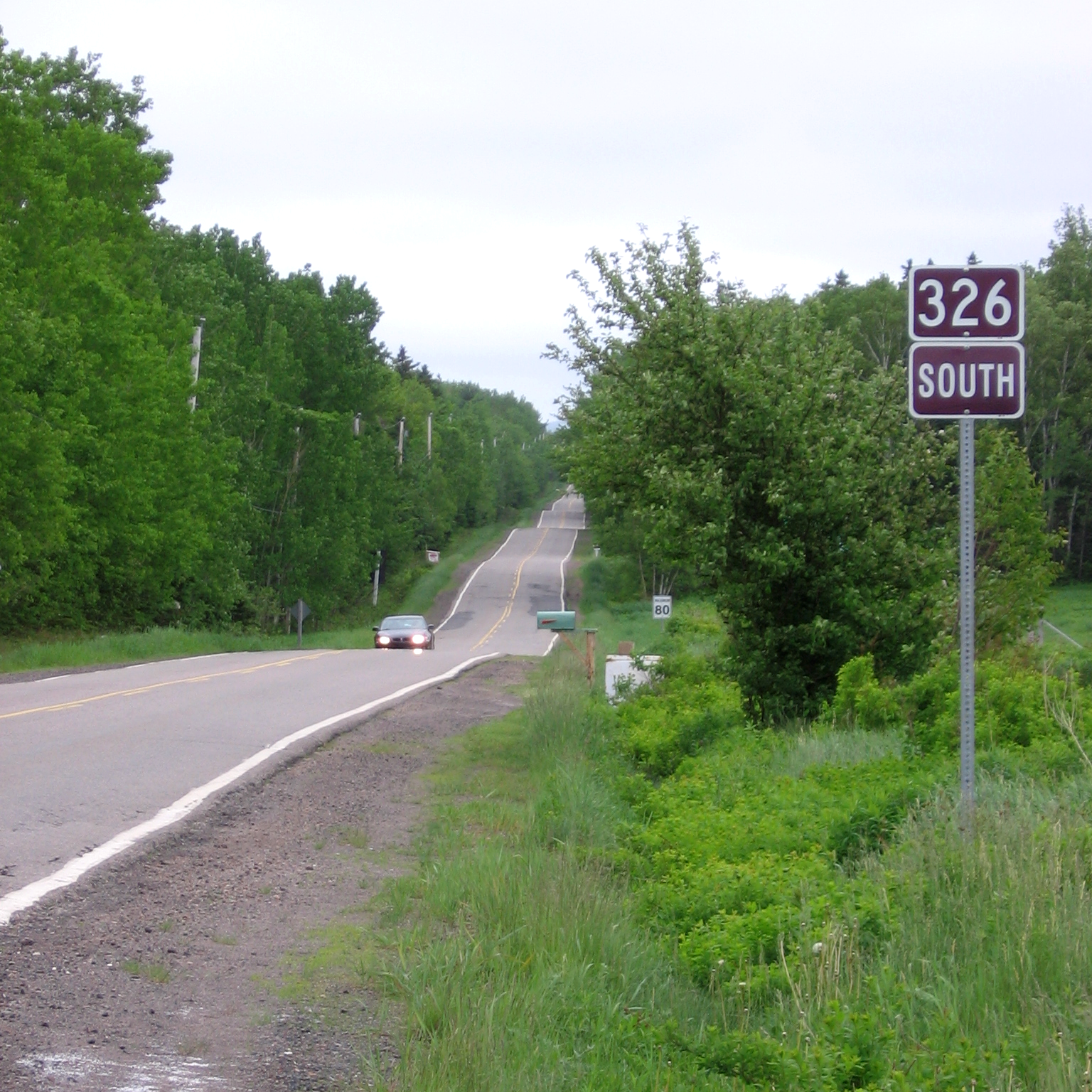
Route 326 near the junction with Trunk 6.

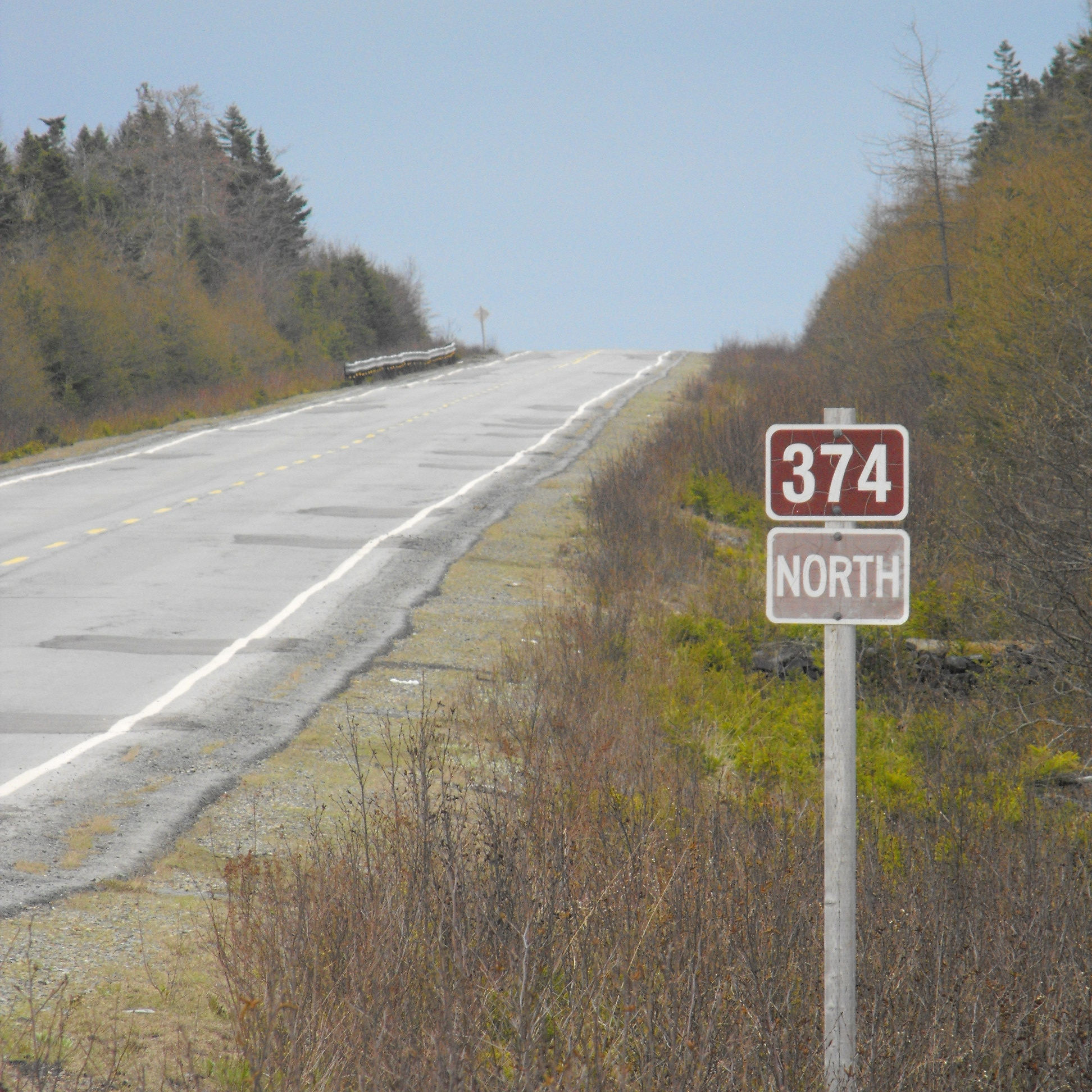
Route 374 in Malay Falls.

Highway	Length (km)	Length (mi)	Destinations	Notes
Route 201	38	24	Annapolis Royal - Bridgetown - Lawrencetown - Middleton - Greenwood - Kingston	
Route 202	38	24	Mount Uniacke - Upper Rawdon - Nine Mile River	
Route 203	83	52	Carleton - Welshtown - Shelburne	
Route 204	54	34	Amherst - Salem - Streets Ridge	
Route 205	9	5.6	Baddeck - MacAulays Hill	
Route 206	12	7.5	Arichat - West Arichat - Martinique	
Route 207	39	24	Dartmouth - Cole Harbour - Upper Lawerencetown - West Lawerencetown - Lawerencetown - Porters Lake	
Route 208	38	24	South Brookfield - Colpton - Nineveh - New Germany	
Route 209	98	61	Parrsboro - Advocate Harbour - Joggins	
Route 210	32	20	Greenfield - Chelsea - Newcombville	
Route 211	35	22	Isaac's Harbour North - Stormont II (Country Harbour Ferry) - Port Bickerton - Stillwater	
Route 212	31	19	Halifax Stanfield International Airport - Goffs - Elderbank	
Route 213	22	14	Upper Tantallon - Hammonds Plains - Bedford	
Route 214	10	6.2	Elmsdale - Belnan - Lower Nine Mile River	
Route 215	120	75	Newport Corner - Noel - Maitland - Shubenacadie	
Route 216	42	26	Christmas Island - Eskasoni - East Bay	
Route 217	64	40	Freeport - East Ferry - Tiddville - Digby	
Route 219	20	12	Dunvegan - Margaree Harbour	
Route 221	63	39	Kingsport - Canning - Centreville- Spa Springs	
Route 223	72	45	North Side Whycocomagh Bay - Grand Narrows - Christmas Island - Leitches Creek Station	
Route 224	96	60	Shubenacadie - Gays River - Middle Musquodoboit - Upper Musquodoboit - Sheet Harbour	
Route 236	77	48	Scotch Village - Kennetcook - Green Oaks - Truro	
Route 239	14	8.7	North West Arm - Edwardsville - Westmount	
Route 242	16	9.9	Joggins - River Hebert - Maccan	
Route 245	63	39	Sutherlands River - Malignant Cove - Antigonish	
Route 246	25	16	Wentworth - West New Annan - Tatamagouche	
Route 247	11	6.8	St. Peters - Grand River - Lower L'Ardoise	
Route 252	28	17	Mabou - Skye Glen - Whycocomagh	
Route 253	12	7.5	Armdale - Purcell's Cove - Herring Cove	
Route 255	35	22	Glace Bay - Mira Gut - Hornes Road	
Route 256	49	30	West New Annan - The Falls - River John - Lyons Brook	
Route 276	5	3.1	South Lochaber - Goshen	
Route 277	15	9.3	Lantz - Dutch Settlement - Gays River	
Route 289	98	61	Green Oaks - Brookfield - Middle Stewiacke - Upper Stewiacke - Lansdowne - Westville - New Glasgow - Little Harbour	
Route 301	17	11	Oxford - Kolbec - Port Howe	
Route 302	23	14	Southampton - Athol - Maccan - Nappan	
Route 303	11	6.8	Conway - Digby - Digby Ferry	
Route 304	10	6.2	Yarmouth, Yarmouth Bar, Cape Forchu, Yarmouth Light	
Route 305	27	17	Boularderie East - North Sydney - Sydney - Sydney Mines	
Route 306	19	12	Spryfield - Harrietsfield - Williamswood - Sambro	
Route 307	19	12	Wentworth Centre via Wentworth Valley - Six Mile Road - Wallace Station - Wallace	
Route 308	45	28	Morris Island - Surette's Island - Amiraults Hill - Tusket - Quinan	
Route 309	29	18	Barrington - Eel Bay - Clyde River	
Route 311	49	30	Truro - North River - Nuttby - Earltown - Tatamagouche	
Route 312	13	8.1	South Haven - Englishtown - River Bennet	
Route 316	132	82	Half Island Cove - Larry's River - Goldboro - Cross Roads Country Harbour - Goshen - Frasers Mills - St. Andrews - Lower South River	
Route 318	11	6.8	Dartmouth - Port Wallace - Portobello - Waverley	
Route 320	23	14	Arichat - Martinique - Lennox Passage - Louisdale	
Route 321	38	24	Springhill - River Philip - Oxford - Kolbec - Port Howe	
Route 322	22	14	Dartmouth - Woodside - Shearwater - Eastern Passage - Cole Harbour	
Route 324	11	6.8	Lunenburg - Fauxburg - Blockhouse	
Route 325	46	29	Colpton - Wileville - Bridgewater - Maitland - Blockhouse - Mahone Bay	
Route 326	19	12	Earltown - Denmark - Brule Corner	
Route 327	44	27	Gabarus - Big Ridge - Marion Bridge - Membertou - Sydney	
Route 328	3	1.9	Upper Lawrencetown - Lake Major	
Route 329	42	26	East River - Bayswater - Northwest Cove - Mill Cove - Hubbards	
Route 330	17	11	Cape Sable Island - Clarks Harbour - Barrington Passage	
Route 331	57	35	East Port Medway - Petite Riviere - Dublin Shore - LaHave - Pleasantville - Bridgewater	
Route 332	37	23	Upper LaHave - Riverport - Lunenburg	
Route 333	63	39	Beechville - Hatchet Lake - Peggys Cove - Upper Tantallon	
Route 334	20	12	Lower Wedgeport - Arcadia	
Route 335	14	8.7	Lower West Pubnico - Pubnico	
Route 336	23	14	Upper Musquodoboit - Dean - Springside	
Route 337	52	32	Antigonish - Cape George - Malignant Cove	
Route 340	80	50	Hebron - Carleton - Pleasant Valley - Weymouth	
Route 341	10	6.2	Kentville - Canard	
Route 344	47	29	Auld's Cove - Mulgrave - Sand Point - St. Francis Harbour - Boylston	
Route 347	66	41	New Glasgow - Priestville - Garden of Eden - Aspen	
Route 348	101	63	Little Harbour - Pictou Landing - Trenton - New Glasgow - Glenelg - Melrose	
Route 349	25	16	Armdale - Spryfield - Herring Cove - Sambro	
Route 354	70	43	Middle Sackville - Beaver Bank - Upper Rawdon - Gore - Kennetcook - Noel	
Route 357	39	24	Musquodoboit Harbour - Meaghers Grant - Elderbank - Middle Musquodoboit	
Route 358	30	19	Greenwich - Canard - Canning - The Lookoff - Scots Bay	
Route 359	16	9.9	Kentville - Aldershot - Centreville - Halls Harbour	
Route 360	22	14	Morristown - Berwick - Welsford - Harbourville	
Route 362	47	29	Middleton - Spa Springs - Margaretsville - East Margaretsville	
Route 366	47	29	East Amherst - Tidnish Bridge - Lorneville - Northport - Port Howe	
Route 368	17	11	Mahoneys Corner - Streets Ridge - Middleboro - Head of Wallace Bay	
Route 374	86	53	New Glasgow - Stellarton - Lorne - Trafalgar - Sheet Harbour	
Route 376	17	11	West River - Haliburton	
Route 395	37	23	Southwest Margaree - Upper Margaree - Ainslie Glen - Churchview	

== Scenic Routes ==
Name	Length (km)	Length (mi)	Southern or western terminus	Northern or eastern terminus	Component highways	Opened	Removed	Notes
Bras d'Or Lakes Scenic Drive	417	259	Tourist loop around Bras d'Or Lake		Highway 105; Trunk 4; Route 205; Route 216; Route 223	—	Current	
Cabot Trail	298	185	Hwy 105 at South Haven	Hwy 105 at Buckwheat Corner	Trunk 30; Highway 105	—	Current	
Ceilidh Trail	112	70	Hwy 104 / Hwy 105 / Trunk 4 in Port Hastings	Cabot Trail in Margaree Harbour	Trunk 19; Route 219	—	Current	
Digby Neck and Islands Scenic Drive	64	40	Route 217 in Digby	Westport, Brier Island	Route 217	—	Current	
Evangeline Trail	292	181	Hwy 101 / Hwy 102 in Bedford	Trunk 3 in Yarmouth	Trunk 1; Highway 101	—	Current	
Fleur-de-lis Trail	217	135	Hwy 104 / Hwy 105 / Trunk 19 in Port Hastings	Louisbourg	Trunk 4; Trunk 28; Route 206; Route 247; Route 327	—	Current	35 km (22 mi) spur to Isle Madame.
Fundy Shore Ecotour	360	224	Trunk 2 at Upper Nappan	Trunk 14 in Brooklyn	Trunk 2; Route 209; Route 215; Route 236; Route 242; Route 302	—	Former	
Fundy Shore Scenic Drive	128	80	Trunk 2 at Upper Nappan	Trunk 2 at Parrsboro	Route 209; Route 242; Route 302	—	Current	
Glooscap Trail	357	222	Hwy 104 in Fort Lawrence	Scots Bay	Trunk 1; Trunk 2; Trunk 14; Route 215; Route 236	—	Current	59 km (37 mi) spur between Truro and Enfield.
Kejimkujik Scenic Drive	113	70	Trunk 3 in Liverpool	Trunk 1 in Annapolis Royal	Trunk 8	—	Current	
Lighthouse Route	585	364	Trunk 1 in Yarmouth	Trunk 3 in Halifax	Trunk 3; Hwy 103; Route 309; Route 329; Route 330; Route 331; Route 332; Route 333	—	Current	
Marconi Trail	63	39	Louisbourg	Trunk 4 / Trunk 28 in Glace Bay	Route 255	—	Current	
Marine Drive	414	257	Dartmouth	Hwy 104 / Trunk 4 at Aulds Cove	Trunk 7; Trunk 16; Route 207; Route 211; Route 316; Route 322; Route 344	—	Current	16 km (10 mi) spur to Canso.
Sunrise Trail	333	207	Hwy 104 in Amherst	Canso Causeway	Hwy 104; Hwy 106; Trunk 4; Trunk 6; Route 245; Route 337; Route 366	—	Current	
