= Fundy Shore Ecotour =

Network of tourist sites in Nova Scotia, Canada

Coordinates: 45.64371°N 64.51491°W

Route information
- Maintained by Department of Transportation and Infrastructure Renewal
- Length: 360 km (220 mi)
- Component highways: Trunk 2; Route 209; Route 215; Route 236; Route 242; Route 302

Major junctions
- West end: Hwy 104 (TCH) in Amherst
- East end: Trunk 14 in Brooklyn

Location
- Country: Canada
- Province: Nova Scotia
- Counties: Hants, Colchester, Cumberland

Highway system
- Provincial highways in Nova Scotia; 100-series

The Fundy Shore Ecotour is a former scenic drive and network of tourist destinations in the Canadian province of Nova Scotia and encircles several sub-basins of the Bay of Fundy, which contains the highest tidal range on the planet.

The Fundy Shore Ecotour ran from Brooklyn, Hants County in the south, to Amherst, Cumberland County near the inter-provincial boundary with New Brunswick in the north. It followed the shores of Chignecto Bay, Minas Basin, and Cobequid Bay and overlaps with and extends the Glooscap Trail in many places.

Some remnant signage of the Fundy Shore Ecotour still remain, but the route has been largely replaced by the Glooscap Trail and Fundy Shore Scenic Drive.

== Communities ==
- Amherst
- River Hebert
- Joggins
- Advocate Harbour
- Parrsboro
- Five Islands
- Economy
- Bass River
- Glenholme
- Onslow
- Truro
- Old Barns
- Clifton
- Beaver Brook
- Green Oaks
- Maitland
- Selma
- Noel Shore
- Onslow
- Minasville
- Moose Brook
- Tenecape
- Walton
- Pembroke
- Cambridge
- Bramber
- Cheverie
- Kempt Shore
- Summerville
- Centre Burlington
- Brooklyn

== Parks ==
- Cape Chignecto Provincial Park
- Central Grove Provincial Park
- Clairmont Provincial Park
- Five Islands Provincial Park

== Museums ==
- Fundy Geological Museum
- Age of Sail Heritage Centre
- Joggins Fossil Cliffs

== Highways ==
- Trunk 2
- Route 215
- Route 236
- Route 242
- Route 209
- Route 302

== Books ==
- Nova Scotia Adventurer's Companion. Fundy Shore ecotour. Halifax: Tourism Nova Scotia. 1999. ISBN 1894420004.
