= Nova Scotia Route 368 =

Highway in Nova Scotia, Canada

Route 368

Route information
- Maintained by Nova Scotia Department of Transportation and Infrastructure Renewal
- Length: 17 km (11 mi)

Major junctions
- South end: Trunk 4 in Mahoneys Corner
- Route 204 in Streets Ridge
- North end: Trunk 6 in Head of Wallace Bay

Location
- Country: Canada
- Province: Nova Scotia

Highway system
- Provincial highways in Nova Scotia; 100-series
← Route 366	→ Route 374

Route 368 is a collector road in the Canadian province of Nova Scotia.

It is located in Cumberland County and connects Mahoneys Corner at Trunk 4 with Head of Wallace Bay at Trunk 6. It was originally a part of Trunk 4 until 1970 .

== Communities ==
- Mahoneys Corner
- Streets Ridge
- South Middleboro
- Middleboro
- North Middleboro
- Fountain Road
- Head of Wallace Bay

== History ==

Before the 1960s, the section of the Collector Highway 368 from Streets Ridge to Mahoneys Corner was designated as Trunk Highway 4.

== See also ==
- List of Nova Scotia provincial highways
