= Nova Scotia Route 321 =

Highway in Nova Scotia, Canada

Route 321

Route information
- Maintained by Nova Scotia Department of Transportation and Infrastructure Renewal
- Length: 38 km (24 mi)

Major junctions
- South end: Trunk 2 in Springhill
- Hwy 104 (TCH) / Route 204 in Oxford
- North end: Trunk 6 in Port Howe

Location
- Country: Canada
- Province: Nova Scotia
- Counties: Cumberland

Highway system
- Provincial highways in Nova Scotia; 100-series
← Route 320	→ Route 322

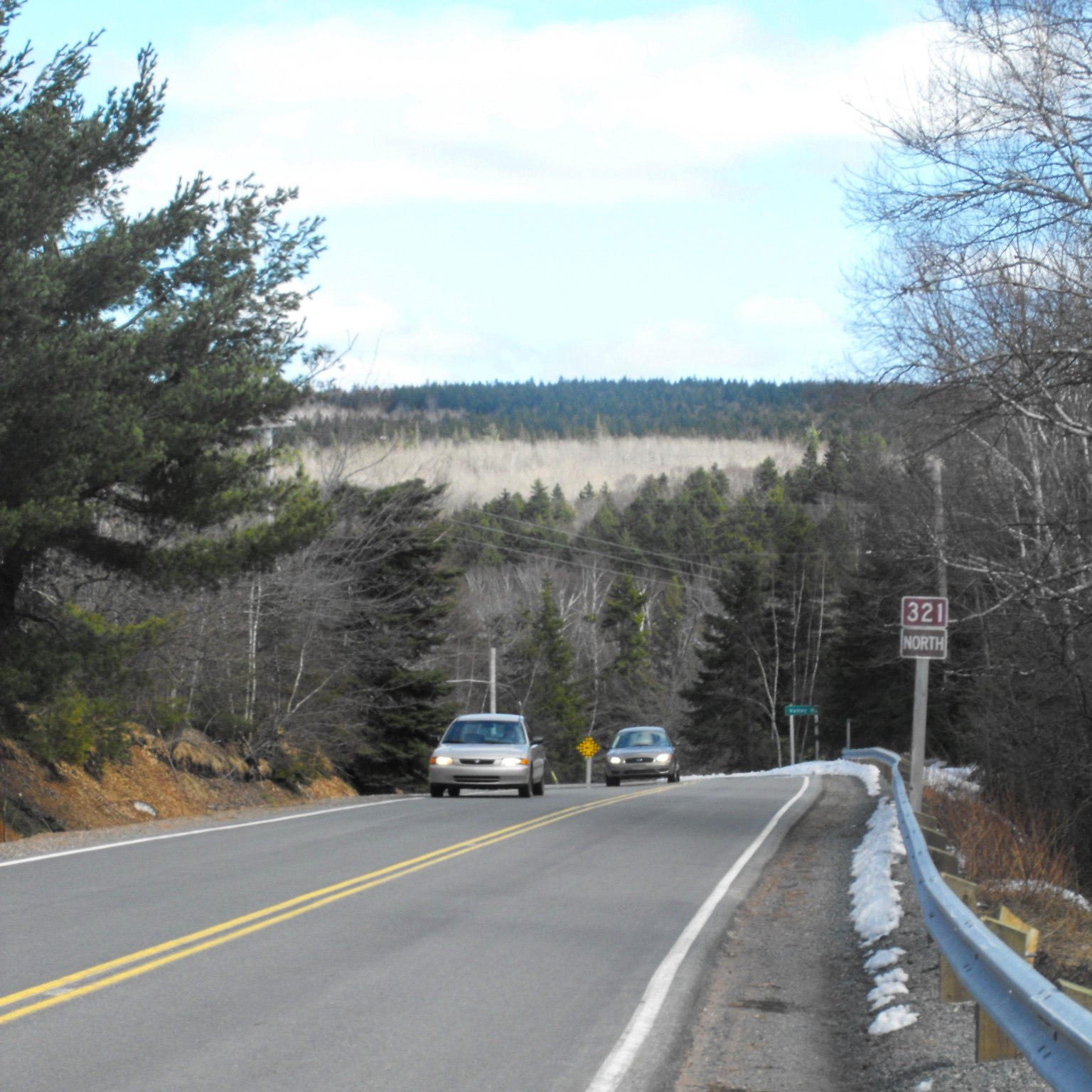
Route 321 outside Springhill, Nova Scotia

Route 321 is a collector road in the Canadian province of Nova Scotia.

It is located in Cumberland County and connects Springhill at Route 2 with Port Howe at Trunk 6.

From Port Howe it travels southward following the eastern banks of River Philip to the town of Oxford. For the first while in the town it is known as Pugwash Road. It then turns to the west and is known as Water Street. Most of Water Street is also Route 204. Near the centre of Oxford the route turns southward and is known as Main Street where it has an interchange with Highway 104 (Trans Canada Highway). From there it travels southward to River Philip where it turns westward and heads to Trunk 2 in Springhill and is known locally as Main Street.

== Communities ==
- Springhill (known as Main Street)
- Salt Springs
- Valley Road
- River Philip
- Oxford (known as Water Street, Main Street and Upper Main Street)
- Kolbec
- Rockley
- Riverview
- Port Howe

== Major intersections ==
Major Intersections/Junctions in order from Port Howe to Springhill.

- Murray Road
- Hansford Siding Road
- Hansford Road
- Water Street, Oxford
- Birchwood Road, Oxford (Route 204)
- Upper/Lower Main Street, Oxford (Route 301, and Route 204)
- Black River Road, Oxford
- Highway 104 Exit 6 (Trans Canada Highway).
- Wyvern Road
- Junction Road, Springhill (Route 2)

== History ==

The section of Collector Highway 321 from Springhill to Oxford was designated as Trunk Highway 4 before the 1960s.

The section of Highway 321 from Oxford to Port Phillip was designated as Trunk Highway 21.

== See also ==
- List of Nova Scotia provincial highways
