= Nova Scotia Trunk 6 =

Highway in Nova Scotia, Canada

Trunk 6

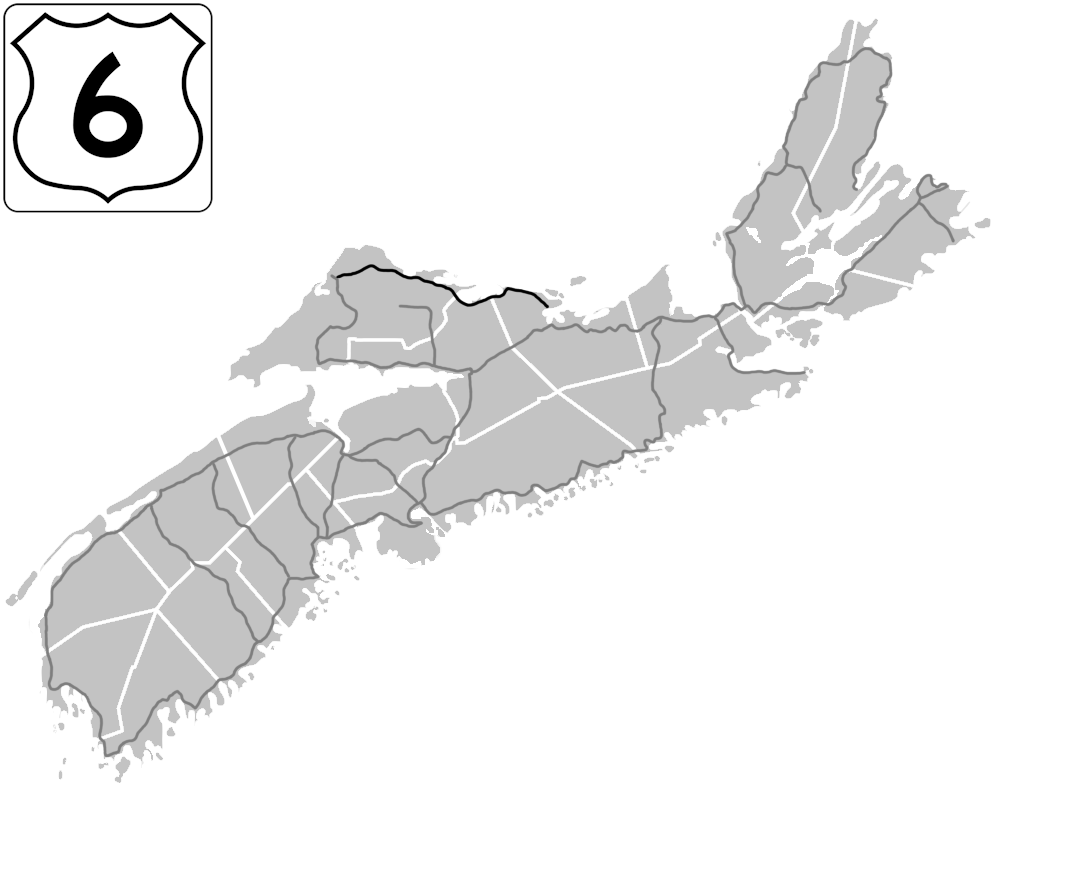

Route information
- Maintained by Department of Transportation and Infrastructure Renewal
- Length: 136.4 km (84.8 mi)

Major junctions
- West end: Hwy 104 (TCH) in Amherst
- Trunk 2 in Amherst
- East end: Hwy 106 (TCH) / Route 376 in Pictou

Location
- Country: Canada
- Province: Nova Scotia
- Counties: Cumberland, Colchester, Pictou
- Towns: Amherst, Pictou

Highway system
- Provincial highways in Nova Scotia; 100-series
← Trunk 4	→ Trunk 7

Trunk 6 is part of the Canadian province of Nova Scotia's system of trunk highways. The route runs from Highway 104 exit 3 at Amherst to the rotary at Pictou, a distance of 136 kilometres (85 mi). It is part of the Sunrise Trail, a designated tourist route.

== Route description ==
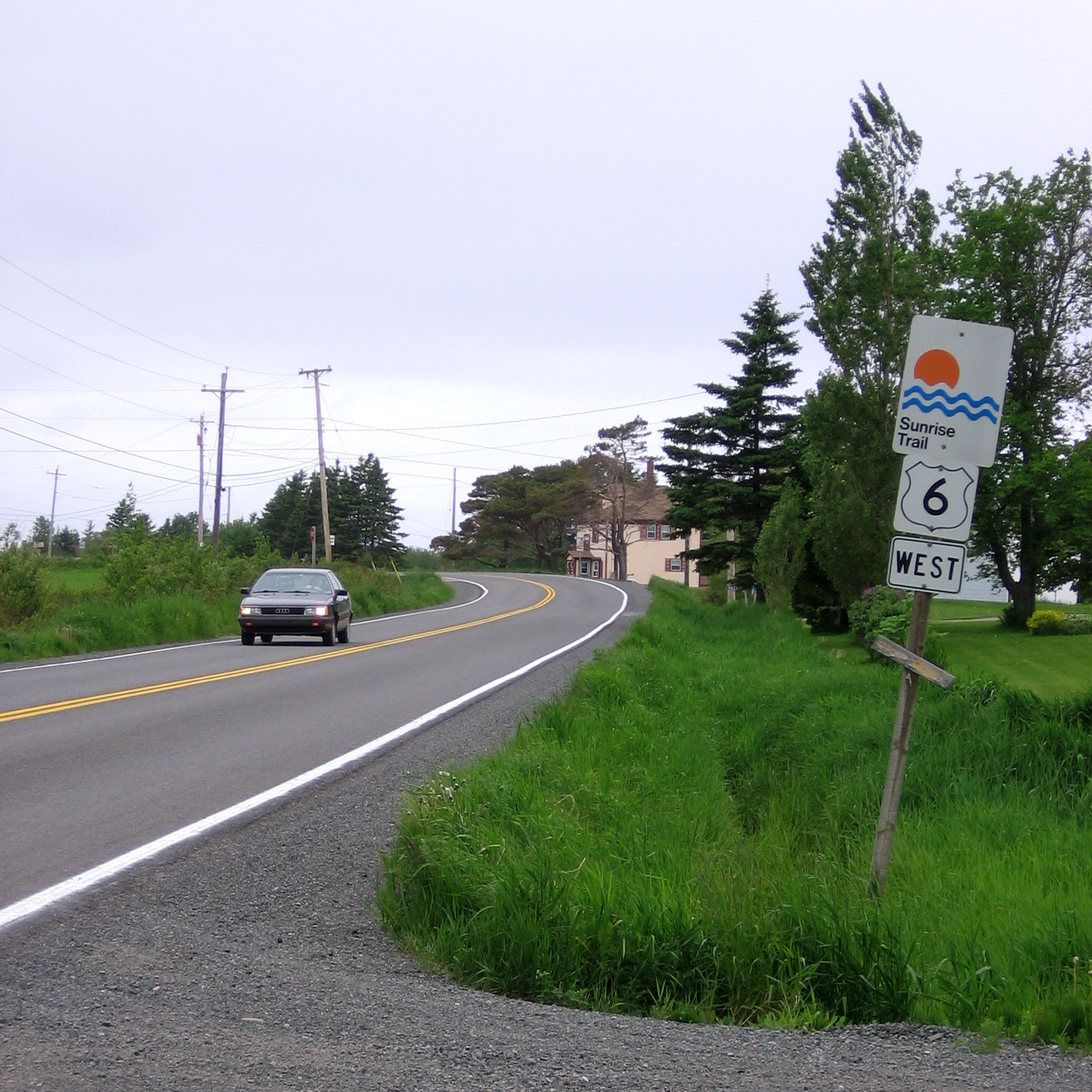
Nova Scotia Trunk 6 in the community of Toney River

For most of its length Trunk 6 is a two-lane highway with a speed limit of 80 km/h (50 mph). In communities, villages or towns the speed limit may drop to as low as 50 km/h (30 mph).

From Amherst, Trunk 6 goes in an easterly direction to the village of Port Philip, where it meets the Northumberland Strait. The route then follows the strait's shoreline through Pugwash, Wallace and Tatamagouche to the town of Pictou.

Until the construction of Highway 106 in the late 1960s, Trunk 6 continued south to New Glasgow on the Alma Road and Trunk 4.

=== Communities ===
- Amherst (Victoria Street East and Victoria Street West)
- East Amherst
- Shinimicas Bridge
- Port Howe
- Port Philip
- Pugwash
- Wallace
- Tatamagouche
- River John
- Toney River
- Pictou

== Major intersections ==
County	Location	km	mi	Exit	Destinations	Notes
Cumberland	Amherst	0.0– 0.4	0.0– 0.25		Hwy 104 (TCH) – Springhill, Truro, Halifax, New Brunswick	Hwy 104 exit 3; western terminus
Cumberland	Amherst	2.8	1.7		Church Street (Trunk 2 east) to Route 204 – Springhill, Oxford	South end of Trunk 2 concurrency
Cumberland	Amherst	2.9	1.8		Lawrence Street (Trunk 2 west) / Havelock Street – Fort Lawrence	North end of Trunk 2 concurrency
Cumberland	East Amherst	3.6	2.2		Route 366 east – Tidnish, Lorneville, Prince Edward Island	
Cumberland	Port Howe	41.9	26.0		Route 366 west – Tidnish, Prince Edward Island	
Cumberland	Port Howe	43.1	26.8		Route 301 south – Riverview, Oxford	
Cumberland	↑ / ↓	44.2	27.5	Crosses the River Philip		
Cumberland	Port Philip	44.4	27.6		Route 321 south – Oxford, Springhill	
Cumberland	Pugwash	50.9	31.6	Crosses the Pugwash River		
Cumberland	Head of Wallace Bay	58.7	36.5		Route 368 south – Oxford, Wentworth	
Cumberland	Wallace Bridge	64.2	39.9	Crosses the Wallace River		
Cumberland	Wallace	67.6	42.0		Route 307 south – Wentworth, Folly Lake	
Colchester	Tatamagouche	86.9	54.0		Route 246 south (Maple Avenue) – West New Annan, Wentworth	
Colchester	Tatamagouche	88.1	54.7		Route 311 south – Earltown, Truro	
Colchester	Brule Corner	98.0	60.9		Route 326 south to Route 311 – Denmark, Earltown	
Pictou	River John	107.6	66.9	Crosses the River John		
Pictou	Pictou	136.4	84.8	3D	Route 376 south to Route 256 – Lyons Brook, Durham	Pictou Rotary; Signed as exit 3C to Trunk 6 west; eastern terminus; exit numbers follow Hwy 106
Pictou	Pictou	136.4	84.8	3E	Hwy 106 (TCH) south to Hwy 104 (TCH) – New Glasgow, Truro, Cape Breton	Pictou Rotary; Signed as exit 3C to Trunk 6 west; eastern terminus; exit numbers follow Hwy 106
Pictou	Pictou	136.4	84.8	3A	West River Road – Pictou	Pictou Rotary; Signed as exit 3C to Trunk 6 west; eastern terminus; exit numbers follow Hwy 106
Pictou	Pictou	136.4	84.8	3B	Hwy 106 (TCH) north – PEI Ferry	Pictou Rotary; Signed as exit 3C to Trunk 6 west; eastern terminus; exit numbers follow Hwy 106
1.000 mi = 1.609 km; 1.000 km = 0.621 mi: Concurrency terminus

== See also ==
- List of Nova Scotia provincial highways
