= Nova Scotia Trunk 2 =

Highway in Nova Scotia, Canada

Trunk 2

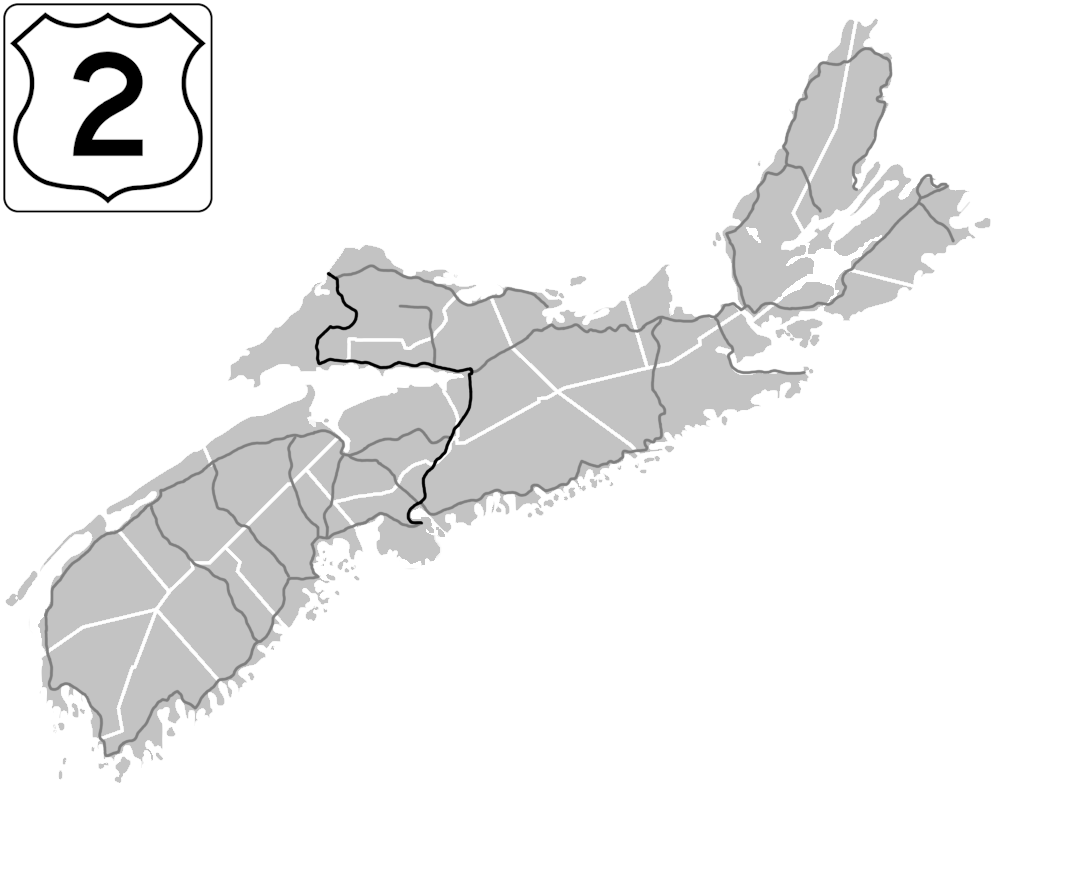
- Map of Trunk 2 in black.

Route information
- Maintained by Nova Scotia Department of Transportation and Infrastructure Renewal
- Length: 266.0 km (165.3 mi)

Major junctions
- South end: Hwy 102 in Halifax
- Hwy 111 in Halifax; Trunk 7 / Trunk 1 in Bedford; Hwy 102 / Hwy 118 near Fall River; Hwy 102 near Enfield; Trunk 14 in Milford Station; Hwy 102 / Trunk 4 near Truro; Hwy 104 (TCH) near Masstown; Trunk 4 in Glenholme; Hwy 142 in Springhill; Hwy 104 (TCH) / Trunk 6 in Amherst
- North end: Hwy 104 (TCH) in Fort Lawrence

Location
- Country: Canada
- Province: Nova Scotia
- Counties: Hants, Colchester, Cumberland, Halifax Regional Municipality, East Hants
- Towns: Amherst, Springhill, Stewiacke, Truro

Highway system
- Provincial highways in Nova Scotia; 100-series
← Trunk 1	→ Trunk 3

Trunk 2 is part of the Canadian province of Nova Scotia's system of Trunk Highways. The route runs from Halifax to Fort Lawrence on the New Brunswick border. Until the 1960s, Trunk 2 was the Halifax area's most important highway link to other provinces, and was part of a longer Interprovincial Highway 2 which ended in Windsor, Ontario. The controlled access Highway 102 and Highway 104 now carry most arterial traffic in the area, while Trunk 2 serves regional and local traffic.

This highway forms part of the Glooscap Trail signed tourist route.

== Route description ==
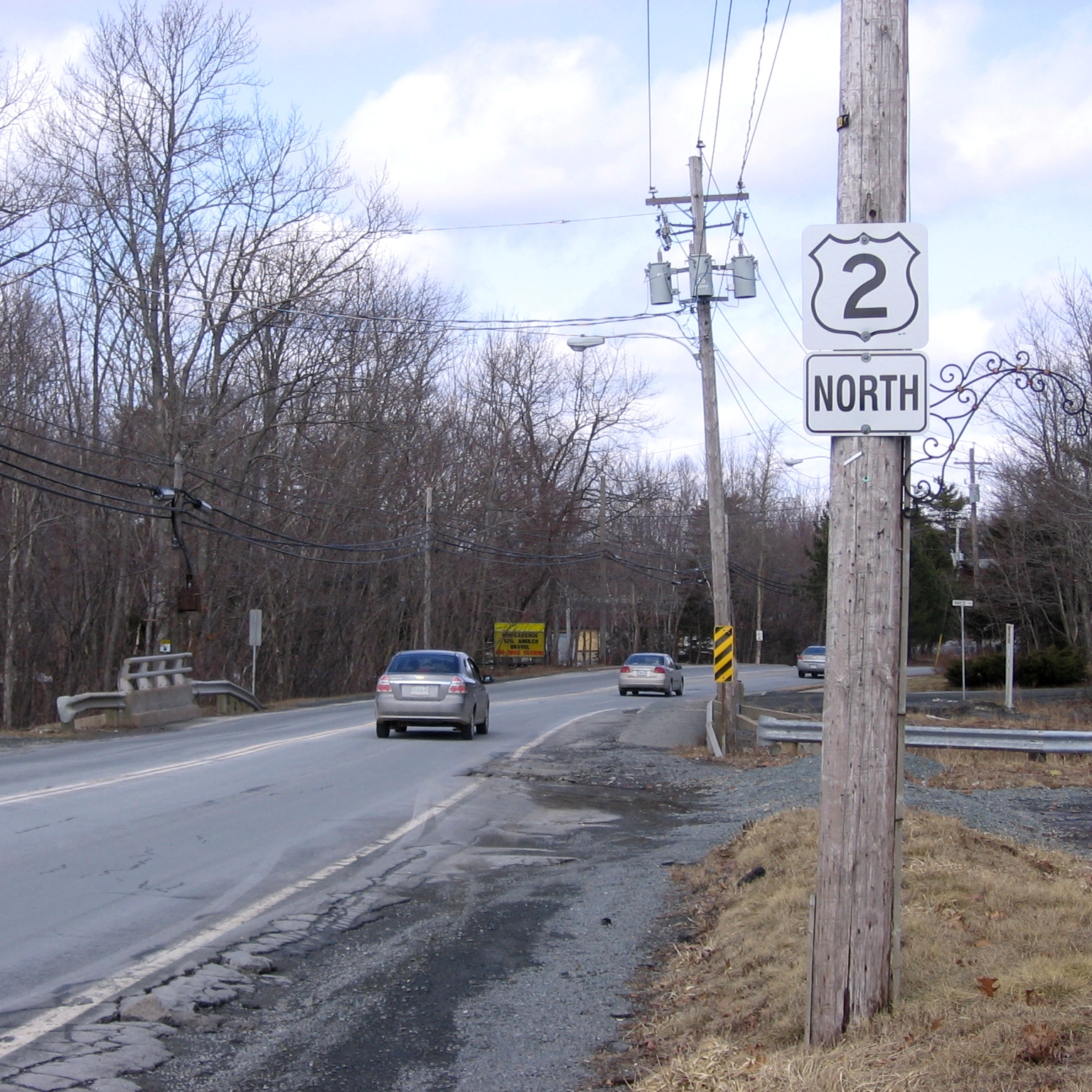
Nova Scotia Trunk 2 in Fall River.

Trunk 2 begins at intersection of Connaught Avenue and Bayers Road on the Halifax Peninsula in the Halifax Regional Municipality, and travels north along Connaught Avenue and Windsor Street to Lady Hammond Road. This short section has minimal Trunk 2 signage, instead being signed as the main connection between Highway 102 and Highway 111. At the intersection of Lady Hammond Road and Windsor Street, route heads north, following the Bedford Highway, which runs along the western shore of the Bedford Basin, to the former town of Bedford.

At the north end of Bedford, Trunk 2 takes the Rocky Lake Drive northeast to Waverley where it then turns north (as a continuation of the Waverley Road) along the eastern shore of Lake Thomas. It passes through Fall River and continues along the eastern shore of Fletchers Lake as it passes through Fletchers Lake. It continues along the eastern shore of Shubenacadie Grand Lake and passes through Wellington Station, Wellington, Grand Lake Station and Oakfield before turning slightly northeast to enter the Shubenacadie Valley.

It enters Hants County at Enfield where it crosses to the west bank of the Shubenacadie River. The highway follows the west side of the Shubenacadie Valley through Elmsdale, Lantz and Milford Station to the village of Shubenacadie where it crosses to the east bank of the Shubenacadie River and enters Colchester County. It climbs out of the Shubenacadie Valley and passes by the town of Stewiacke and the rural community of Brookfield, the suburb of Hilden and the Millbrook First Nation before entering the town of Truro.

In Truro, Trunk 2 follows Willow Street and then Prince Street West (co-signed for Trunk 4), then Juniper Street and Robie Street to the interchange with Highway 102 in Lower Truro. Trunk 2/4 follows Highway 102 for 1 kilometre to the north, crossing the Salmon River between exits 14 and 14A to Onslow and then continues as a local road heading west from Onslow along the north shore of Cobequid Bay through Masstown and Glenholme, where Trunk 2 and 4 separate.

From Glenholme, Trunk 2 continues west along the north shore of the Minas Basin through Great Village, Bass River, Economy, and Five Islands forming parts of the Glooscap Trail and Fundy Shore Ecotour. At the town of Parrsboro, Trunk 2 turns north through the Cobequid Hills to Newville Lake before turning northeast to reach the Southampton River, which Trunk 2 follows to the town of Springhill. Trunk 2 turns northwest from Springhill and runs a further 30 km to the town of Amherst which it passes through until it reaches the rural community of Fort Lawrence on the interprovincial boundary with New Brunswick.

== History ==
The section of Trunk 2 between Springhill and Little Forks was once Trunk 26 prior to 1938. Trunk 26 then turns left on Little Forks Rd and ends in Athol. At this time, Trunk 2 took a more westerly route, running through Athol and Nappan. This old alignment of Trunk 2 is currently Collector Highway 302.

Before the 1960s, Trunk 4 was co-signed with Trunk 2 from Amherst to Springhill.

== Major intersections ==
County	Location	km	mi	Destinations	Notes
Halifax	Halifax	0.0	0.0	Connaught Avenue (Hwy 102 inbound) – Downtown Halifax Bayers Road (Hwy 102 outbound) to Hwy 103 – Truro, South Shore, Annapolis Valley	Trunk 2 southern terminus
Halifax	Halifax	1.4	0.87	Hwy 111 east / Windsor Street / Lady Hammond Road – MacKay Bridge, Dartmouth	Windsor Street Exchange; Hwy 111 eastern terminus; south end of Bedford Highway concurrency
Halifax	Halifax	1.9	1.2	To Trunk 3 / Hwy 102 / Joseph Howe Drive	Interchange
Halifax	Halifax	1.9	1.2	To Hwy 102 / Kearney Lake Road	Connects to Dunbrack Street
Halifax	Bedford	9.7	6.0	Hammonds Plains Road (Route 213 west)	
Halifax	Bedford	12.4	7.7	Trunk 7 east (Dartmouth Road) – Dartmouth	Trunk 7 western terminus
Halifax	Bedford	12.6	7.8	Trunk 1 west (Bedford Highway) to Hwy 101 / Hwy 102 – Lower Sackville	Trunk 1 eastern terminus; north end of Bedford Highway concurrency; Trunk 2 follows Rocky Lake Drive
Halifax	Waverley	20.4	12.7	Route 318 south (Waverley Road)	
Halifax	Fall River	21.4	13.3	Hwy 102 / Hwy 118 south – Airport, Truro, Dartmouth, Halifax	Hwy 102 exit 5; Hwy 118 exit 14
Halifax	Enfield	40.6	25.2	Hwy 102 – Elmsdale, Truro, Airport, Dartmouth, Halifax	Hwy 102 exit 7
Hants	Elmsdale	46.0	28.6	Route 214 west to Route 277 / Route 224 / Elmsdale Road – Rawdon, Windsor	
Hants	Lantz	48.8	30.3	Route 277 to Route 224 – Dutch Settlement, Gays River, Musquodoboit Valley	
Hants	Milford Station	57.7	35.9	Trunk 14 west to Route 224 – Nine Mile River, Windsor	
Hants	Shubenacadie	61.9	38.5	Route 215 west – Maitland, Noel, Walton	
Hants	Shubenacadie	62.5	38.8	Route 224 south – Milford, Halifax	Grade separated; south end of Route 224 concurrency
Colchester	Shubenacadie	63.2	39.3	Route 224 east – Gays River, Musquodoboit Valley	North end of Route 224 concurrency
Colchester	Brookfield	84.2	52.3	Route 289 – Green Oaks, Maitland, Upper Stewiacke	
Colchester	Truro	99.5	61.8	Arthur Street (Route 311 north) to Trunk 4 east – Bible Hill	Tatamogouche
Colchester	Truro	99.5	61.8	Prince Street	To Trunk 4 east / Route 311 north
Colchester	Truro	102.2	63.5	Hwy 102 south – Halifax; Route 236 west – Lower Truro, Old Barns	Hwy 102 exit 14; south end of Hwy 102 concurrency
Colchester	Onslow	103.7	64.4	Hwy 102 north to Hwy 104 (TCH) – Amherst, New Glasgow; To Route 311 – Bible Hill, Tatamagouche	Hwy 102 exit 14A; northbound exit, southbound entrance; north end of Hwy 102 concurrency; south end of Trunk 4 concurrency
Colchester	Masstown	118.3	73.5	Hwy 104 (TCH) – Oxford, Amherst, Truro, Halifax	Hwy 104 exit 12
Colchester	Glenholme	121.2	75.3	Trunk 4 west – Wentworth, Amherst	North end of Trunk 4 concurrency
Cumberland	Parrsboro	192.5	119.6	Route 209 west – Diligent River, Port Greville, Advocate Harbour	
Cumberland	Southampton	215.4	133.8	Route 302 north – Amherst	
Cumberland	Springhill	235.9	146.6	Route 321 north – River Philip, Collingwood	
Cumberland	Springhill	236.8	147.1	Hwy 142 to Hwy 104 (TCH) – Amherst, Truro	Hwy 142 southern terminus
Cumberland	Upper Nappan	255.7	158.9	Route 302 south – Maccan, Joggins, Parrsboro	
Cumberland	Amherst	258.3	160.5	Hwy 104 (TCH) – Springhill, Truro, Halifax, New Brunswick	Hwy 104 exit 7
Cumberland	Amherst	261.2	162.3	Church Street (Route 204 south) – Oxford	Trunk 2 follows Church Street
Cumberland	Amherst	261.6	162.6	Victoria Street (Trunk 6 west)	South end of Trunk 6 concurrency; Trunk 2 follows Victoria Street
Cumberland	Amherst	261.7	162.6	Victoria Street (Trunk 6 east) / Havelock Street – Tatamagouche	South end of Trunk 6 concurrency; Trunk 2 follows Lawrence Street
Cumberland		263.9	164.0	Hwy 104 (TCH) west – New Brunswick	Hwy 104 westbound entrance only
Cumberland	Fort Lawrence	265.0– 266.0	164.7– 165.3	Hwy 104 (TCH) – Truro, Halifax, New Brunswick	Trunk 2 northern terminus; exit 1 on Hwy 104
1.000 mi = 1.609 km; 1.000 km = 0.621 mi: Concurrency terminus; Incomplete access

Interprovincial Highway 2
Previous route NB Route 2	Trunk 2	Next route Terminus
