= Nova Scotia Route 320 =

Highway in Nova Scotia, Canada

Route 320

Route information
- Maintained by Nova Scotia Department of Transportation and Infrastructure Renewal
- Length: 23 km (14 mi)

Major junctions
- South end: Route 206 in Arichat
- Route 206 in Martinique
- North end: Hwy 104 (TCH) in Louisdale

Location
- Country: Canada
- Province: Nova Scotia
- Counties: Richmond

Highway system
- Provincial highways in Nova Scotia; 100-series
← Route 318	→ Route 321

Route 320 is a collector road in the Canadian province of Nova Scotia.

It is located in Richmond County and connects Louisdale at Exit 46 on Highway 104 with Arichat at Route 206 .

It crosses the Lennox Passage using the Burnt Island Bridge (a drawbridge) that connects Cape Breton Island to Isle Madame.

== Communities ==
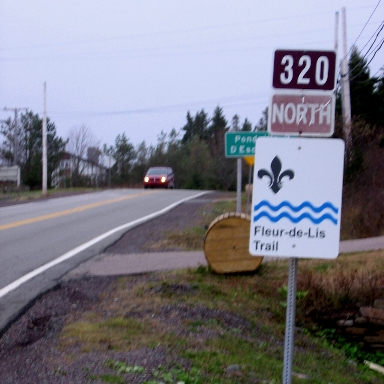
Route 320 in Arichat

- Arichat
- D'Escousse
- Poulamon
- Martinique
- Lennox Passage
- Louisdale

== Parks ==
- Pondville Provincial Park
- Lennox Passage Provincial Park

== History ==
The section of Collector Highway 320 from Arichat to Harbourview Crescent was once designated as Trunk Highway 20.

== See also ==
- List of Nova Scotia provincial highways
