= Nova Scotia Route 307 =

Highway in Nova Scotia, Canada

Route 307

Route information
- Maintained by Nova Scotia Department of Transportation and Infrastructure Renewal
- Length: 19 km (12 mi)

Major junctions
- South end: Trunk 4 in Wentworth Centre
- North end: Trunk 6 in Wallace

Location
- Country: Canada
- Province: Nova Scotia
- Counties: Cumberland County

Highway system
- Provincial highways in Nova Scotia; 100-series
← Route 306	→ Route 308

Route 307 is a collector road in the Canadian province of Nova Scotia.

It is located in Cumberland County and connects Wallace at Trunk 6 with Wentworth Centre at Trunk 4.

== Communities ==
- Wentworth Centre
- Lower Wentworth
- Six Mile Road
- Wallace Station
- Wallace

== Blue Route ==
Traffic volumes are comparatively light on this highway. As a result, Route 376 and a portion of Trunk 4 have become part of Nova Scotia's Blue Route, a designated 55 kilometres (34 mi) cycling corridor, connecting Masstown to Wallace.

== Parks ==
- Wentworth Provincial Park
