= Glooscap Trail =

Scenic route in Nova Scotia, Canada

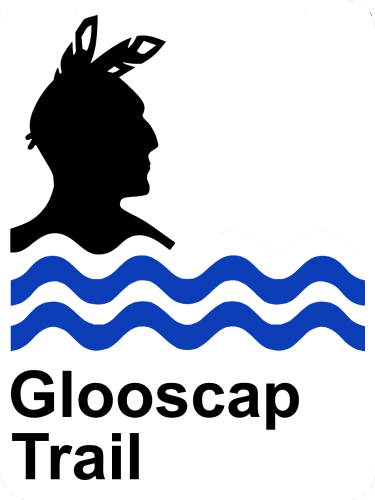
Glooscap Trail

Route information
- Maintained by Department of Transportation and Infrastructure Renewal
- Component highways: Trunk 1; Trunk 2; Trunk 14; Route 215; Route 236; Route 358; Route 209; Route 242

Main segment
- Length: 357 km (222 mi)
- West end: Hwy 104 (TCH) / Trunk 2 at Fort Lawrence
- East end: Route 358 at Scots Bay

Shubenacadie Valley segment
- Length: 59 km (37 mi)
- South end: Trunk 2 in Enfield
- North end: Trunk 2 / Route 236 in Truro

Fundy Shore segment
- Length: 119 km (74 mi)
- South end: Route 209 in Parrsboro
- North end: Route 242 in Maccan

Location
- Country: Canada
- Province: Nova Scotia
- Counties: Hants, Colchester, Cumberland

Highway system
- Provincial highways in Nova Scotia; 100-series

The Glooscap Trail is a scenic roadway in the Canadian province of Nova Scotia.

It is located in the central and northern part of the province around the Minas Basin and Cobequid Bay, sub-basins of the Bay of Fundy. The route connects Amherst in Cumberland County, near the interprovincial boundary with New Brunswick, with Scots Bay in Kings County, Nova Scotia. A spur of Glooscap Trail follows Trunk 2 in Truro, through the Shubenacadie Valley, to Enfield at the boundary with Halifax Regional Municipality. The Fundy Shore segment branches off from the main route in Parrsboro and continues along the Minas Basin shore until reaching Advocate Harbour, where the route then follows the Chignecto Bay, outlining the Chignecto Peninsula.

The main route measures 357 km (222 mi), with the Shubenacadie Valley spur being 59 km (37 mi). Additionally, the Fundy Shore segment is 119 km (74 mi) long.

== Name ==
According to a Mikmaq legend, Glooscap was a giant god-like man who was created by Gisoolg (the Great Spirit Creator) and lived on the high cliffs of Cape Blomidon, overlooking the Bay of Fundy. He was created by a lightning bolt striking sand. The legend credits Glooscap with creating the Five Islands in the Minas Basin. These islands were formed from giant clods of mud thrown by Glooscap at a disrespectful beaver (the beaver's dam had flooded Glooscap's garden). Glooscap smashed the beaver's dam and allowed the water to flow freely, creating the Bay of Fundy tides.

== Communities include ==
- Truro
- Onslow
- Masstown
- Glenholme
- Great Village
- Bass River
- Economy
- Five Islands
- Parrsboro
- Springhill
- Amherst
- Green Oaks
- Beaver Brook
- Clifton
- Old Barns
- Maitland
- Selma
- Noel Shore
- Densmore Mills
- Minasville
- Moose Brook
- Tenecape
- Walton
- Pembroke
- Cambridge
- Bramber
- Cheverie
- Kempt Shore
- Summerville
- Centre Burlington
- Brooklyn
- Windsor
- Wolfville
- Belnan
- Port Greville
- Advocate Harbour
- Apple River
- Joggins
- Maccan
- Diligent River
- Fox River
- Spencers Island

== Parks ==
- Five Islands Provincial Park
- Cape Chignecto Provincial Park

== Museums ==
- Fundy Geological Museum
- Joggins Fossil Cliffs and Centre.
- Age of Sail Museum
- Bass River Heritage Museum
- Ottawa House Museum

== Lighthouses ==
- Apple River Lighthouse
- Cape D'or Lighthouse
- Spencers Island Lighthouse
- Port Greville Lighthouse
- Parrsboro Lighthouse
- Bass River Lighthouse
- Burntcoat Head Lighthouse
- Walton Harbour Lighthouse

== Highways ==
- Trunk 1
- Trunk 2
- Trunk 14
- Route 215
- Route 236
- Route 209
- Route 242
