= Nova Scotia Route 208 =

Highway in Nova Scotia, Canada

Route 208

Route information
- Maintained by Nova Scotia Department of Transportation and Infrastructure Renewal
- Length: 38 km (24 mi)

Major junctions
- South end: Trunk 8 in South Brookfield
- Route 325 in Colpton
- North end: Trunk 10 in New Germany

Location
- Country: Canada
- Province: Nova Scotia

Highway system
- Provincial highways in Nova Scotia; 100-series
← Route 207	→ Route 209

Route 208 is a collector highway in the Canadian province of Nova Scotia.

It is located in Lunenburg County and Queens County and connects New Germany at Trunk 10 with South Brookfield at Trunk 8.

== Communities ==
- South Brookfield
- North Brookfield
- Pleasant River
- Colpton
- Nineveh
- Hemford
- Simpsons Corner
- New Germany

== See also ==
- List of Nova Scotia provincial highways
