= Nova Scotia Route 204 =

Highway in Nova Scotia, Canada

Route 204

Route information
- Maintained by Nova Scotia Department of Transportation and Infrastructure Renewal
- Length: 54 km (34 mi)

Major junctions
- West end: Trunk 2 in Amherst
- Route 301 / Route 321 in Oxford
- East end: Route 368 in Streets Ridge

Location
- Country: Canada
- Province: Nova Scotia

Highway system
- Provincial highways in Nova Scotia; 100-series
← Route 203	→ Route 205

Route 204 is a collector road in the Canadian province of Nova Scotia.

It is located in Cumberland County and runs from Amherst at Trunk 6 to Streets Ridge at Route 368.

== Route description ==
Heading east from the Town of Amherst the route is a two-lane collector highway with a posted speed limit of 80 km/h. In Oxford town limits the route follows Little River Road, Main Street, Water Street and Birchwood Road. From Oxford it continues heading due east with a posted speed limit of 80 km/h until its terminus at Route 368. It was originally part of Trunk 4 until 1970.

=== Communities ===
- Amherst
- Brookdale
- Salem
- Little River
- West Leicester
- Hansford
- South Victoria
- Oxford
- Streets Ridge

== History ==
Route 204 has been around unofficially for many decades and for many years was the main road between Truro and Amherst. Before the current alignment of Highway 104 was constructed the route was part of the Trans Canada Highway.

Before the 1960s, the section of Route 204 from Oxford to Streets Ridge was designated as Trunk 4.

== See also ==
- List of Nova Scotia provincial highways
