= Nova Scotia Route 332 =

Highway in Nova Scotia, Canada

Route 332

Route information
- Maintained by Nova Scotia Department of Transportation and Infrastructure Renewal
- Length: 37 km (23 mi)

Major junctions
- West end: Trunk 3 in Upper LaHave
- Trunk 3 / Route 324 in Lunenburg
- East end: Blue Rocks Road in Garden Lots

Location
- Country: Canada
- Province: Nova Scotia
- Counties: Lunenburg

Highway system
- Provincial highways in Nova Scotia; 100-series
← Route 331	→ Route 333

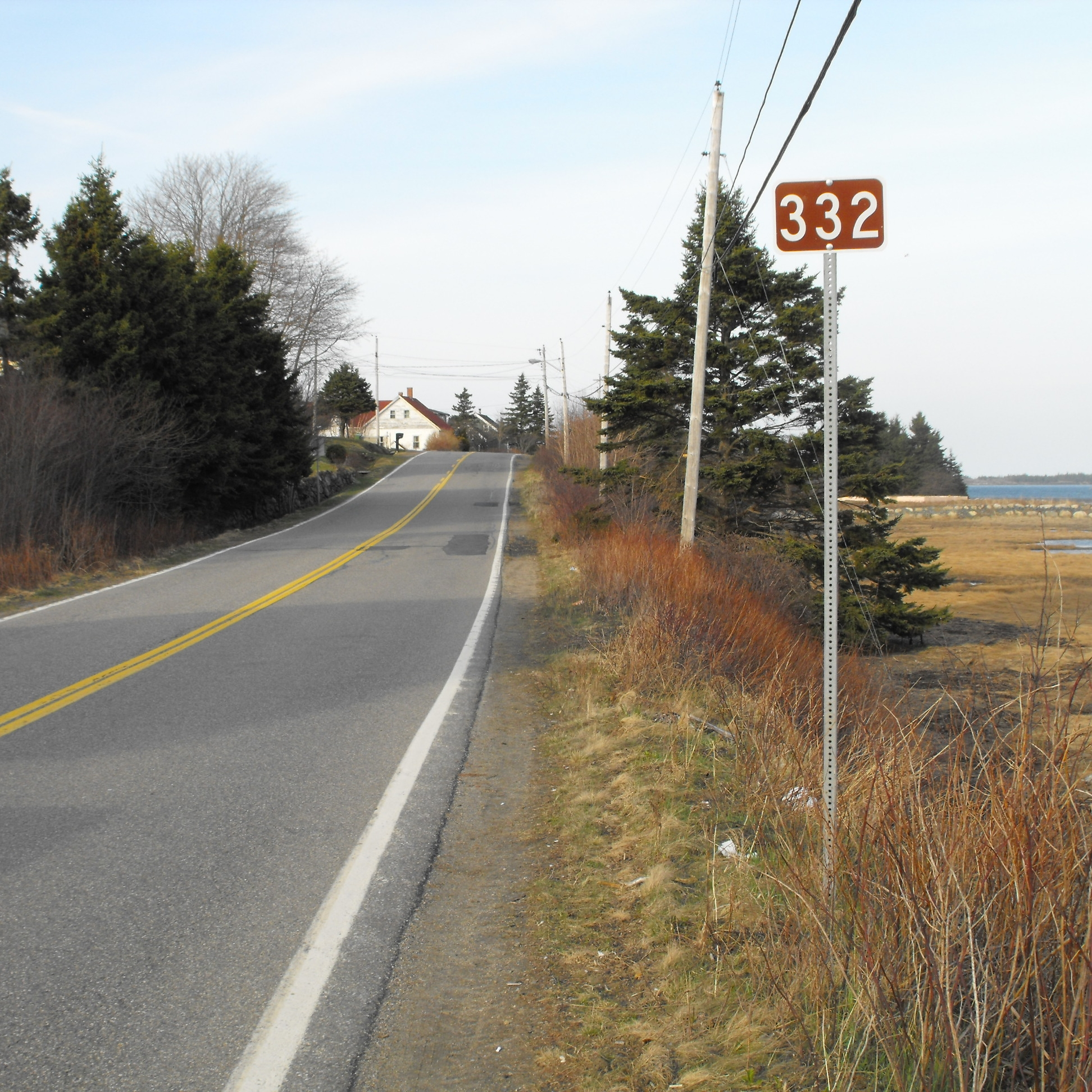
Nova Scotia Route 332

Route 332 is a collector road in the Canadian province of Nova Scotia. It is located in Lunenburg County, connecting Bridgewater at Trunk 3 with Lunenburg at Trunk 3. It is commonly referred to residences as Riverport Road as the village appears on all major road signage in the county.

== Communities ==
- Upper LaHave
- Middle LaHave
- East LaHave
- Riverport
- Rose Bay
- Bayport
- First South
- Lunenburg
- Garden Lots

== Trails ==
The Riverport & District Community Development Committee submitted a recommended name to the Lunenburg Active Transportation Plan to the Municipality of the District of Lunenburg (MODL). It was to recognize the important role played by Riverport on the LaHave River over the past two hundred and fifty years. Most major infrastructure in the area, e.g., the fire department; school, post office, electric utility, fish plant and churches. Highway 332, has traditionally been known to local residences as the Riverport Road. This goes back as far as the 1870s with the creation of the Ritcey Cove Circuit which was renamed to the Riverport District.

== Parks ==
- Ovens Natural Park

== History ==
The entirety of Collector Highway 332 was once designated as Trunk Highway 32.

== See also ==
- List of Nova Scotia provincial highways
