= Nova Scotia Route 206 =

Highway in Nova Scotia, Canada

Route 206

Route information
- Maintained by Nova Scotia Department of Transportation and Infrastructure Renewal
- Length: 12 km (7.5 mi)

Major junctions
- South end: Route 320 in Arichat
- North end: Route 320 in Martinique

Location
- Country: Canada
- Province: Nova Scotia

Highway system
- Provincial highways in Nova Scotia; 100-series
← Route 205	→ Route 207

Route 206 is a collector road in the Canadian province of Nova Scotia.

It is located in Richmond County and loops around the southwest portion of Isle Madame, connecting with Route 320 at both of its ends.

== Communities ==
- Arichat
- West Arichat
- Martinique

== Parks ==
- Lennox Passage Provincial Park
- Burnt Island Provincial Park
- Pondville Beach Provincial Park

== See also ==
- List of Nova Scotia provincial highways
