= Nova Scotia Route 335 =

Highway in Nova Scotia, Canada

Route 335

Route information
- Maintained by Nova Scotia Department of Transportation and Infrastructure Renewal
- Length: 14 km (8.7 mi)

Major junctions
- South end: Pubnico Point Wind Farm in Lower West Pubnico
- North end: Trunk 3 in Pubnico

Location
- Country: Canada
- Province: Nova Scotia
- Counties: Yarmouth

Highway system
- Provincial highways in Nova Scotia; 100-series
← Route 334	→ Route 336

Route 335 is a collector road in the Canadian province of Nova Scotia.

It is located in Yarmouth County and connects Pubnico at Trunk 3 with Lower West Pubnico.

== Communities ==
- Lower West Pubnico
- Middle West Pubnico
- West Pubnico
- Pubnico

== History ==
The entirety of Collector Highway 335 was once designated as Trunk Highway 35.

== See also ==
- List of Nova Scotia provincial highways
