= Nova Scotia Route 302 =

Highway in Nova Scotia, Canada

Route 302

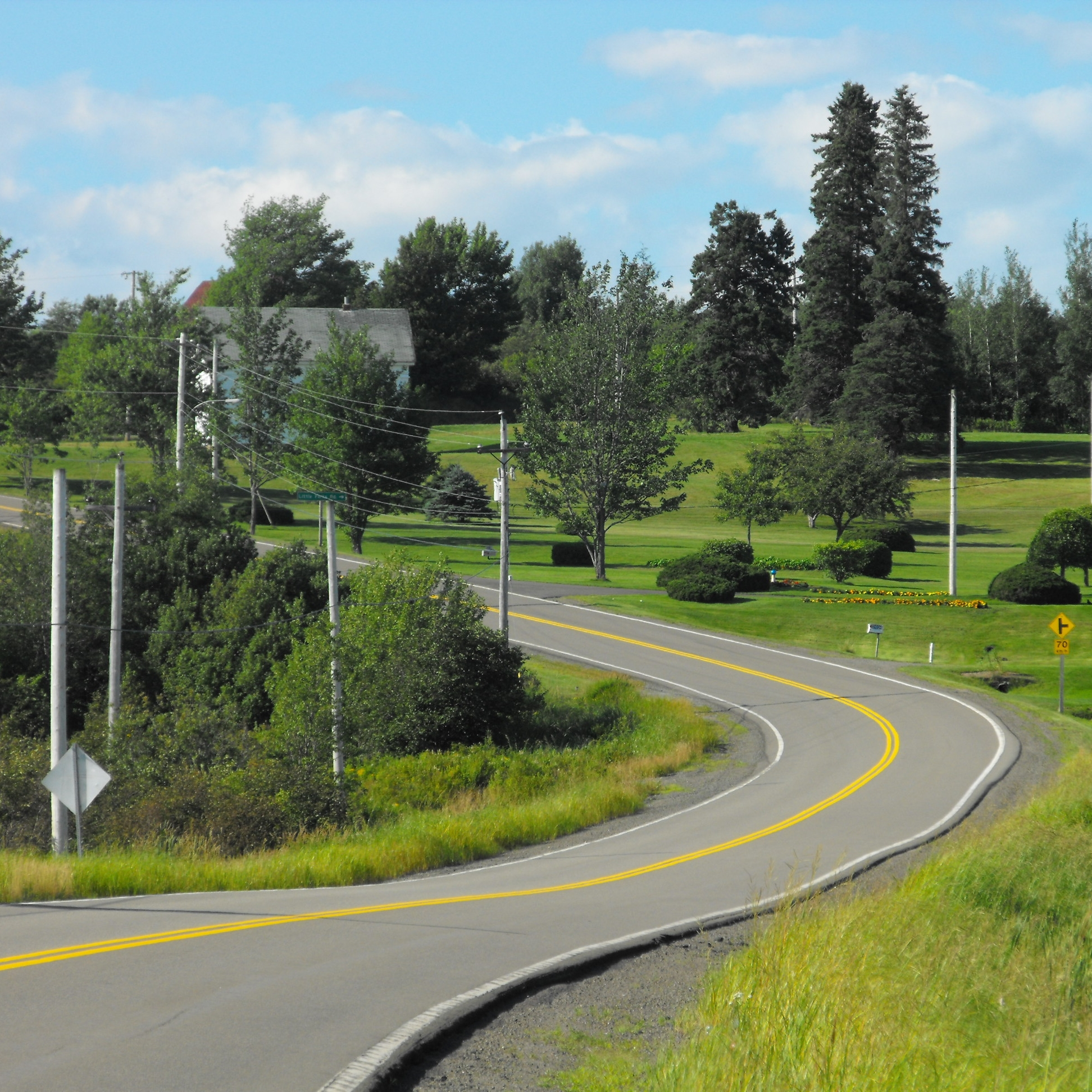
- Route 302 passes through Athol, Nova Scotia.

Route information
- Maintained by Nova Scotia Department of Transportation and Infrastructure Renewal
- Length: 23 km (14 mi)

Major junctions
- South end: Trunk 2 in Southampton
- Route 242 in Maccan
- North end: Trunk 2 in Upper Nappan

Location
- Country: Canada
- Province: Nova Scotia
- Counties: Cumberland

Highway system
- Provincial highways in Nova Scotia; 100-series
← Route 301	→ Route 303

Route 302 is a collector road in the Canadian province of Nova Scotia.

It is in Cumberland County and connects Amherst at Trunk 2 with Southampton at Trunk 2. It is designated as part of the Fundy Shore Scenic Drive.

== Communities ==
- Southampton
- South Athol
- Athol
- Maccan
- Nappan

== History ==
Trunk 2A
- Location: Southampton–Upper Nappan
- Length: 15 km (9.3 mi)

The entirety of Collector Highway 302 was originally part of and older westerly route of Trunk Highway 2, but was re-designated as Trunk Highway 2A when Trunk 2 was realigned. The route also intersected former Trunk 26 in Athol, now named Little Forks Road.

== See also ==
- List of Nova Scotia provincial highways
