= Nova Scotia Route 301 =

Highway in Nova Scotia, Canada

Route 301
- Kolbec Road

Route information
- Maintained by Nova Scotia Department of Transportation and Infrastructure Renewal
- Length: 17 km (11 mi)

Major junctions
- West end: Route 204 in Oxford
- East end: Trunk 6 in Port Howe

Location
- Country: Canada
- Province: Nova Scotia
- Counties: Cumberland

Highway system
- Provincial highways in Nova Scotia; 100-series
| ← Route 289 | → Route 302 |

Route 301 is a collector road in the Canadian province of Nova Scotia.

It is located in Cumberland County and connects Oxford at Route 204 with Port Howe at Trunk 6.

From Port Howe it follows the western bank of River Philip to Oxford town limits. In Oxford it continues in a south-west direction to its terminus at Little River Road Route 204 as Lower Main Street.

== Communities ==
- Oxford(Lower Main Street)
- Kolbec (Kolbec Road)
- Riverview
- Port Howe (Kolbec Road)

== See also ==
- List of Nova Scotia provincial highways
