= Nova Scotia Route 334 =

Highway in Nova Scotia, Canada

Route 334

Route information
- Maintained by Nova Scotia Department of Transportation and Infrastructure Renewal
- Length: 20 km (12 mi)

Major junctions
- South end: Wedge Point in Lower Wedgeport
- North end: Trunk 3 in Arcadia

Location
- Country: Canada
- Province: Nova Scotia
- Counties: Yarmouth

Highway system
- Provincial highways in Nova Scotia; 100-series
← Route 333	→ Route 335

Route 334 is a collector road in the Canadian province of Nova Scotia.

It is located in Yarmouth County and connects Arcadia at Trunk 3 with Lower Wedgeport.

== Communities ==
- Lower Wedgeport
- Wedgeport
- Upper Wedgeport
- Plymouth
- Arcadia

== History ==
The entirety of Collector Highway 334 was once designated as Trunk Highway 34.

== See also ==
- List of Nova Scotia provincial highways
