= Nova Scotia Route 333 =

Highway in Nova Scotia, Canada

Route 333

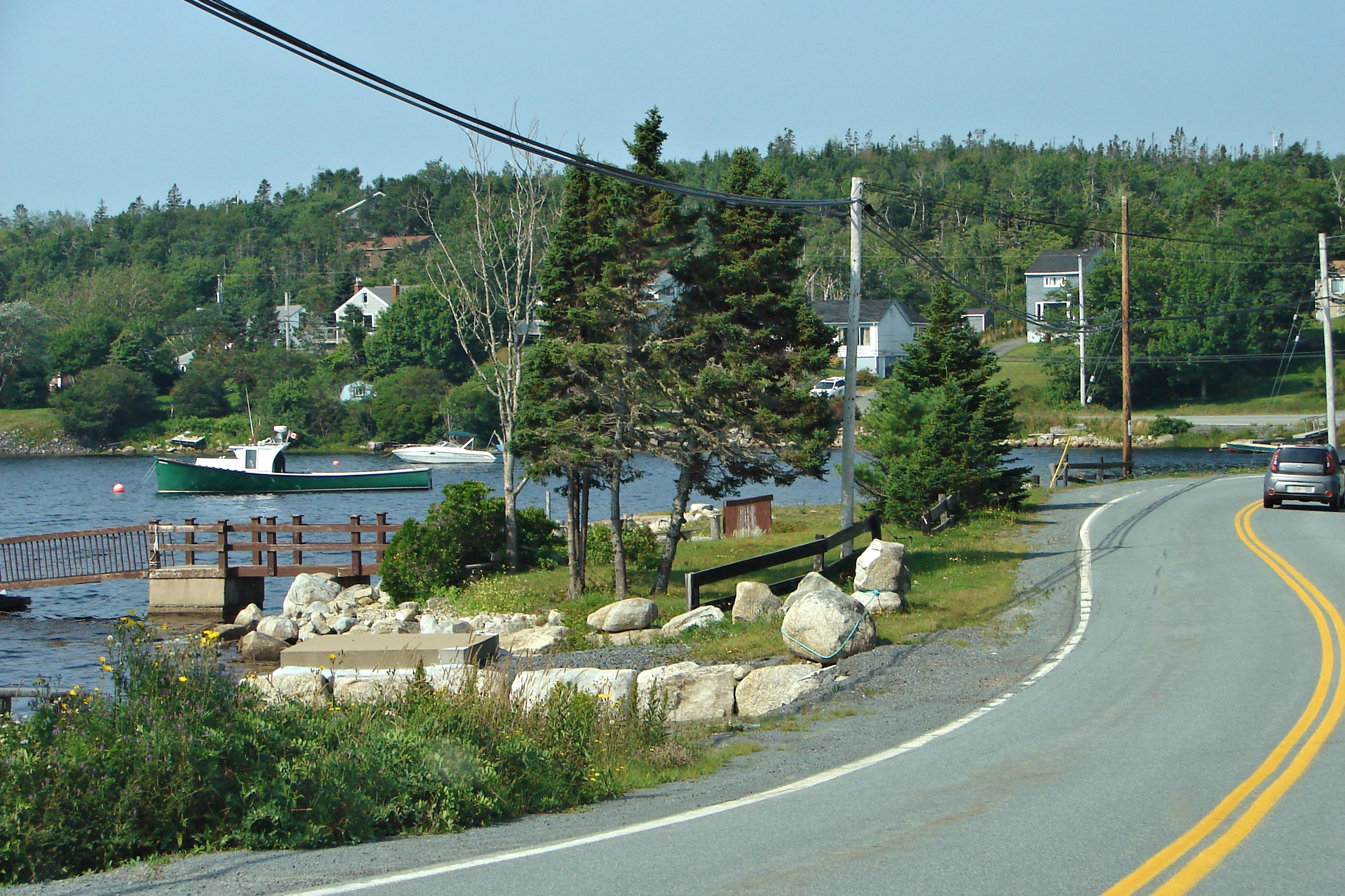
- Route 333 though Bayside

Route information
- Maintained by Nova Scotia Department of Transportation and Infrastructure Renewal
- Length: 63 km (39 mi)
- Tourist routes: Lighthouse Route

Major junctions
- West end: Trunk 3 in Upper Tantallon
- East end: Trunk 3 in Beechville

Location
- Country: Canada
- Province: Nova Scotia
- Counties: Halifax Regional Municipality

Highway system
- Provincial highways in Nova Scotia; 100-series
← Route 332	→ Route 334

Route 333 is a collector road in the Canadian province of Nova Scotia.

It is located in the Halifax Regional Municipality, connecting Upper Tantallon at Trunk 3 with Beechville at Trunk 3.

From Tantallon to Peggy's Cove it is known as the "Peggy's Cove Road". From West Dover to Beechville it is named the "Prospect Road". The entire route is part of the Lighthouse Route scenic travel way.

== Route description ==
=== Communities ===
- Upper Tantallon
- Tantallon
- Glen Haven
- French Village
- Seabright
- Glen Margaret
- Hacketts Cove
- Indian Harbour
- Peggys Cove
- West Dover
- Middle Village
- Bayside
- Shad Bay
- Whites Lake
- Hatchet Lake
- Goodwood
- Beechville

=== Parks ===
- Long Lake Provincial Park
- West Dover Provincial Park
- Peggy's Cove Swissair Flight 111 Memorial Park

=== Other ===
- Peggys Point Lighthouse

== History ==
Trunk 33
- Location: Upper Tantallon–Beechville
- Length: 63 km (39 mi)

The entirety of Collector Highway 333 was once designated as Trunk Highway 33. The Trunk 33 designation is now used on the Bedford Bypass as an unsigned highway.

== See also ==
- List of Nova Scotia provincial highways
- Swissair Memorial
