= Fundy Shore Scenic Drive =

Scenic drive in Nova Scotia, Canada

Route information
- Length: 128 km (80 mi)
- Component highways: Route 209; Route 242; Route 302

Major junctions
- West end: Trunk 2 at Upper Nappan
- East end: Trunk 2 in Parrsboro

Location
- Country: Canada
- Province: Nova Scotia
- Counties: Cumberland County

Highway system
- Provincial highways in Nova Scotia; 100-series

The Fundy Shore Scenic Drive is a scenic drive in the Canadian province of Nova Scotia. It located along the northeastern portion of the Bay of Fundy, following the Chignecto Peninsula which separates Chignecto Bay and Minas Basin, an area which contains the highest tidal range on the planet.

The Fundy Shore Scenic Drive runs from Upper Nappan, just south of Amherst, to Parrsboro and is entirely in Cumberland County. Some older maps show the route as being an alternate route of the Glooscap Trail.

== Communities ==
- Amherst
- Nappan
- Maccan
- River Hebert
- Joggins
- Advocate Harbour
- Port Greville
- Parrsboro

== Parks ==
- Cape Chignecto Provincial Park
- Rave Head Wilderness Area

== Museums ==
- Fundy Geological Museum
- Age of Sail Heritage Centre
- Joggins Fossil Cliffs

== Highways ==
- Route 209
- Route 242
- Route 302
