= Oxford Regional Education Centre =

School in Nova Scotia

Coordinates: 45°44′16.1″N 63°51′55.2″W

Oxford Regional Education Centre (OREC) is a school in Oxford, Nova Scotia, Canada.

The school teaches grades primary through 12. The school's basketball team are known as the Oxford Golden Bears, represented by a golden bear.

The school opened in January 2010 and finished the 1st term with that month. It was a $13 million project. It combined the two old schools Oxford Regional Elementary School (ORES primary-5) and Oxford Regional High School (ORHS 6–12). It has around 450 students and is a Division 3 school. Official Web Site
