= Nova Scotia Route 209 =

Highway in Nova Scotia, Canada

Route 209

Route information
- Maintained by Nova Scotia Department of Transportation and Infrastructure Renewal
- Length: 98 km (61 mi)

Major junctions
- South end: Trunk 2 in Parrsboro
- North end: Route 242 in Joggins

Location
- Country: Canada
- Province: Nova Scotia

Highway system
- Provincial highways in Nova Scotia; 100-series
← Route 208	→ Route 210

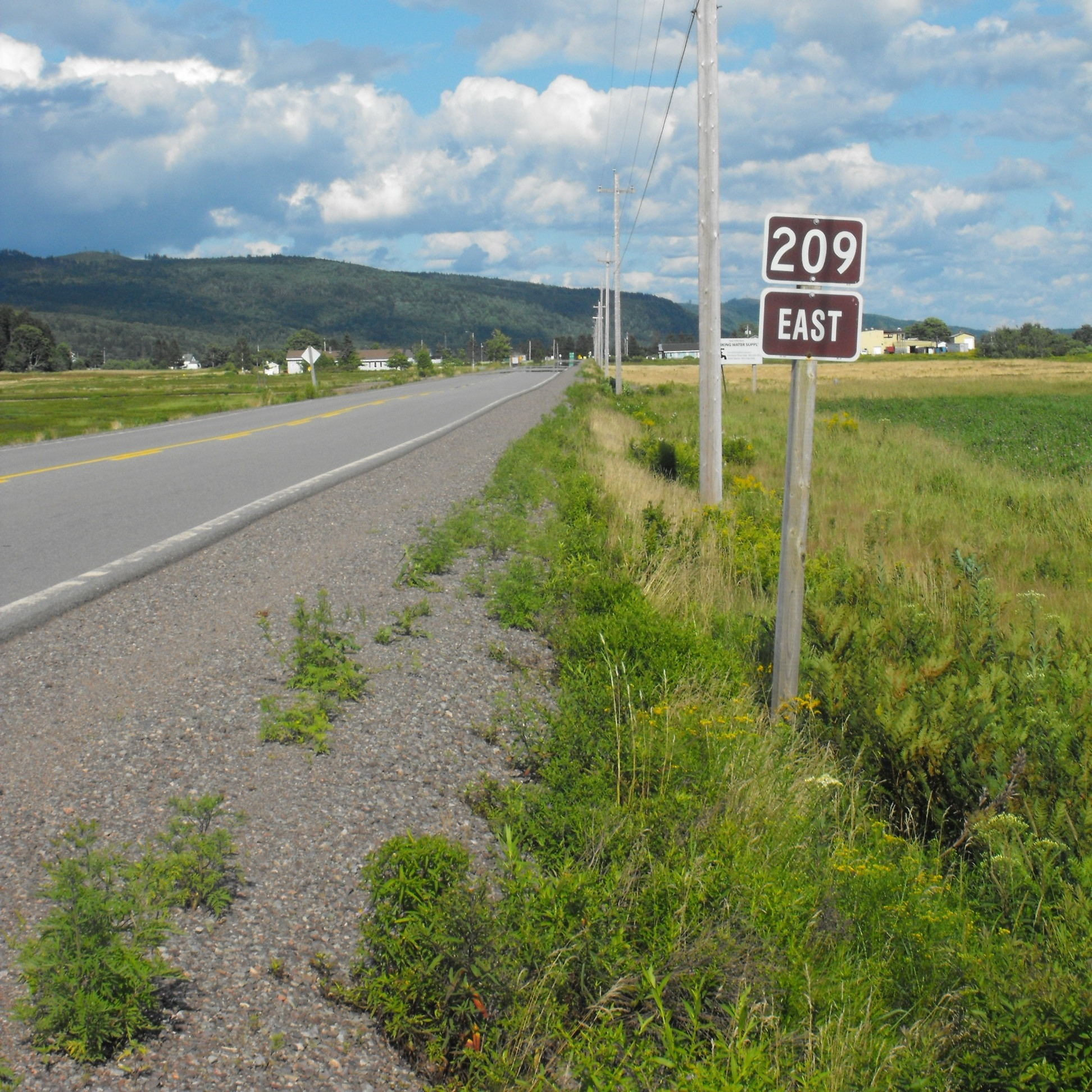
Route 209

Route 209 is a collector road in the Canadian province of Nova Scotia.

It is located in Cumberland County and follows the shoreline of the Bay of Fundy, connecting Parrsboro with Joggins. The linked communities are known as the Parrsboro Shore.

It is designated as part of the Fundy Shore Scenic Drive. Highway 209 was formerly designated as Trunk Highway 9.

== Communities ==
- Parrsboro
- Kirkhill
- Wharton
- Diligent River
- Fox River
- Port Greville
- Wards Brook
- Brookville
- East Fraserville
- Fraserville
- Spencer's Island
- East Advocate
- Advocate Harbour
- Point Hill
- New Salem
- Apple River
- East Apple River
- Sand River
- Shulie
- Two Rivers
- Joggins

== Parks ==
- Cape Chignecto Provincial Park
- Chignecto Game Sanctuary

== History ==
The section of Collector Highway 209 from Parrsboro to Apple River was once designated as Trunk Highway 9.

== See also ==
- List of Nova Scotia provincial highways
