= Shad Bay, Nova Scotia =

Shad Bay
- Community Village
- Location within Nova Scotia
- Coordinates: 44°31′31″N 63°46′12″W
- Country: Canada
- Province: Nova Scotia
- Municipality: Halifax Regional Municipality
- District: 11
- Founded: 1755

Government
  - Type: Regional Council
  - Governing Council: Halifax Regional Council
  - Community Council: Chebucto Community Council

Area
  - Total: 100.42 km^{2} (38.77 sq mi)
- Highest elevation: 31 m (102 ft)
- Lowest elevation: 0 m (0 ft)

Population 2001
  - Total: 2,053
- Time zone: UTC-4 (AST)
  - Summer (DST): UTC-3 (ADT)
- Canadian Postal code: B3T
- Telephone Exchange: 902 852
- GNBC Code: CBICI
- Total Dwellings: 812
- Part of a series about Places in Nova Scotia Schools:1 (Atlantic Memorial)

Shad Bay is a rural community on the Chebucto Peninsula in the Halifax Regional Municipality on the shore of the Atlantic Ocean on (Route 333 ), 16.3 kilometers from Halifax, in Nova Scotia, Canada.

== Electoral district ==
- Federal - Halifax West
- Provincial -Timberlea - Prospect

schools:1(Atlantic Memorial)
