= River Philip =

Coordinates: 45.8522°N 63.7387°W

Location
- Country: Canada
- Province: Nova Scotia

Physical characteristics
- Source
  - location: Cobequid Mountains
- Mouth
  - location: Northumberland Strait
  - elevation: sea level

The River Philip is a river contained entirely within Cumberland County, Nova Scotia, Canada.

It passes by the communities of River Philip and Oxford Junction before being crossed by Nova Scotia Highway 104. It proceeds through the town of Oxford and reaches the coast near Port Howe and Port Philip where it is crossed by Nova Scotia Trunk 6.

== See also ==
- List of rivers of Nova Scotia
