= Mahoneys Corner =

Community in Nova Scotia, Canada

Coordinates: 45°41′21″N 63°37′48″W

Mahoneys Corner in Nova Scotia

Mahoneys Corner is a locality in the Canadian province of Nova Scotia, located in Cumberland County.
