= Fountain Road =

Community in Nova Scotia, Canada

Coordinates: 45°47′56″N 63°35′03″W

Fountain Road in Nova Scotia

Fountain Road is a community in the Canadian province of Nova Scotia, located in Cumberland County.
