= Skye Glen, Nova Scotia =

Community in Nova Scotia, Canada

Coordinates: 45°59′5″N 61°10′57″W

Skye Glen in Nova Scotia

Skye Glen (Scottish Gaelic: Gleann nan Sgitheanach) is a small community in the Canadian province of Nova Scotia, located in Inverness County on Cape Breton Island.

== History ==
Skye Glen was settled in the 1830s, and is named after Skye in Scotland. The area had a mill and a school in the 1870s.
