= Beaver Brook, Nova Scotia =

Community in Nova Scotia, Canada

Coordinates: 45°18′42.29″N 63°25′7.81″W

Beaver Brook in Nova Scotia

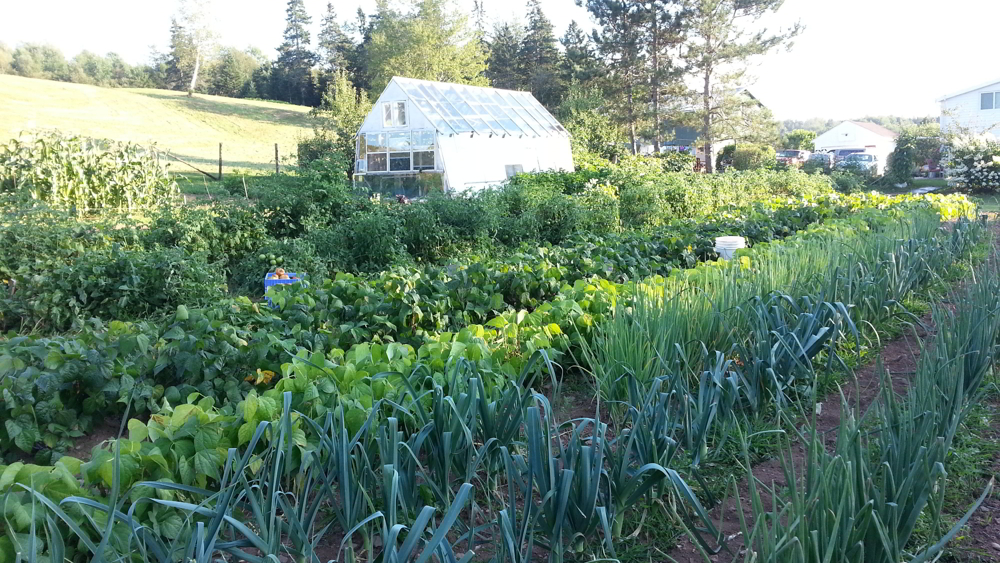
A well organized garden in Beaver Brook.

Beaver Brook is an unincorporated community in the Canadian province of Nova Scotia, located in Colchester County. It is a mainly rural community with one small saw mill. Beaver Brook is located on the 236 Highway just west of the community of Old Barns. The "Beaver Brook" runs through the community's farm fields and finally into the Cobequid Bay at the headwaters of the Bay of Fundy.
