= Wallace, Nova Scotia =

Community in Nova Scotia, Canada

Coordinates: 45°48′45.96″N 63°28′12.28″W

Wallace in Nova Scotia

Wallace is a community in the Canadian province of Nova Scotia, located in Cumberland County.

== History ==
Originally called Remsheg (or Ramshag), meaning 'the place between' in the Mi'kmaq language. The homes of the Acadians who lived in the village were burned as part of the Bay of Fundy Campaign (1755) during the French and Indian War. Wallace and near-by Tatamagouche, Nova Scotia were the first villages in Acadia to be burned because they were the gateway through which Acadians supplied the French Fortress Louisbourg.

Fourteen other ranks of the Royal Fencible American Regiment took up land grants in Remsheg following the American Revolutionary War, as did the Westchester Refugees from Westchester county, New York (sometimes known as DeLancey's 'Cowboys' for their cattle raids to help the British cause).

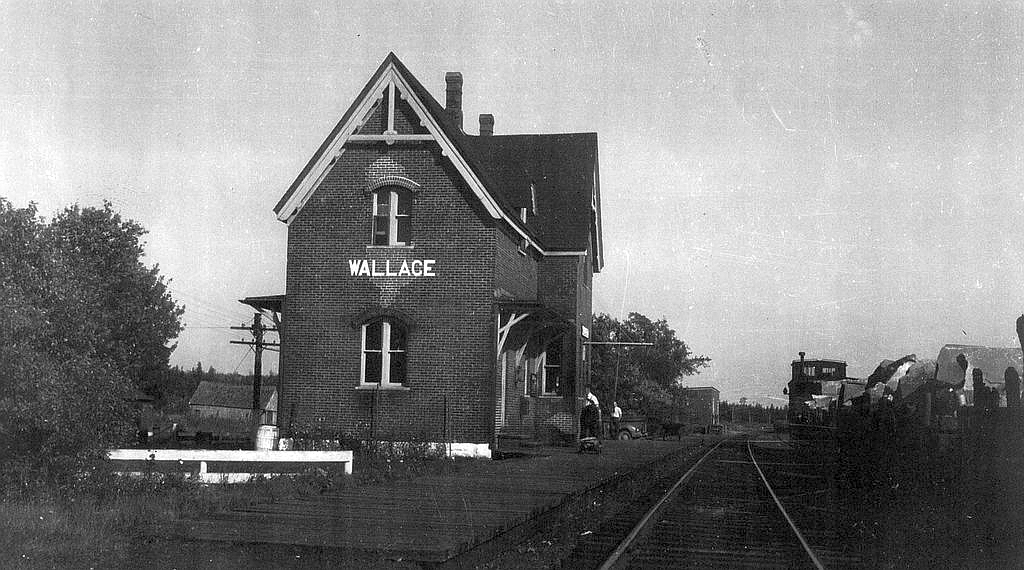
Train station in Wallace, late 1800s

Scottish immigrants followed and the village was renamed Wallace in honour of Scottish folk hero William Wallace as well as the first colonial treasurer of Nova Scotia, Michael Wallace.

The village is located at the mouth of the Wallace River where it meets Wallace Bay on the Northumberland Strait. Wallace Harbour is deep and straight, at one time being used by large ships hauling lumber and quarry stone. The Wallace River is a major river in northern Cumberland County and was once home to quarries and lumber mills and used to transport their products by sailing ships. Many of these ships were built in Wallace and surrounding areas.

Construction of the Montreal and European Short Line Railway Company began on the north shore of Nova Scotia in 1888, with the aim being to link Oxford with Pictou and onward to a superport under consideration for Canso. The section between Oxford and Pictou opened in 1890 and was known as the "Short Line" - in reference to the shorter distance between New Brunswick and Pictou County, rather than following the main line south from New Brunswick to Truro. Wallace's importance as a shipping port, quarrying industries, and small-scale manufacturing saw a spur line built from the Short Line at Wallace Station, approximately 3 kilometres inland, to the south of the village.

By the post-war years, Wallace's importance for marine traffic declined and its small shipping port fell into disrepair—the Canadian Coast Guard even began decommissioning its lighthouses there. The railway connection was removed and rail service in the area was abandoned in the mid-1980s. The village's primary mode of transportation is by automobile and the village is situated on Trunk 6 which hosts a scenic route named the Sunrise Trail.

== Today ==
Wallace remains a small service centre for northeastern Cumberland County and has an elementary school, volunteer fire department, several stores and businesses, and a community hall. There is also a recreation complex including a tennis court, basketball court, baseball field and outdoor ice rink.

There are Anglican, Presbyterian, and United Church of Canada churches as well as the Wallace-and-Area Museum.

Wallace is famous for its sandstone quarries. Opened in 1863, the quarry employed as many as 100 men in the 19th century. It was closed for two decades from the 1960s to the 1980s, but now employs ten people. Wallace sandstone has a marked olive hue and can be found in many buildings around the Maritimes and eastern Canada. Originally used for foundations, breakwaters and bridge abutments, it is now a facing stone. Sandstone from Wallace has been used in the legislative buildings in Charlottetown, Prince Edward Island (Province House) and Halifax (Province House), as well as some edifices on Parliament Hill in Ottawa, Ontario. Other local industries include: fishing, farming, and forestry.

== Notable people ==
Wallace is the birthplace of Simon Newcomb, the astronomer and mathematician, and the hometown of figure skater John Mattatall as well as the retirement residence of 2009 Nobel Prize in Physics co-winner Willard Boyle co-inventor of the charge-coupled device or the CCD imaging chip at the heart of digital cameras.

== Parks ==
- Fox Harbour Provincial Park
- Gulf Shore Provincial Park
