= Wharton, Nova Scotia =

Community in Nova Scotia, Canada

Wharton
- Location within Nova Scotia
- Coordinates: 45°25′N 64°23′W
- Country: Canada
- Province: Nova Scotia
- Municipality: Cumberland County
- Time zone: UTC-4 (AST)
- Postal code: B
- Area code: 902
- Part of a series about Places in Nova Scotia

Wharton is a rural community in Cumberland County, Nova Scotia.
