= East Port Medway, Nova Scotia =

Community in Nova Scotia, Canada

Coordinates: 44°9′25″N 64°34′19″W

East Port Medway in Nova Scotia

East Port Medway is a community in the Canadian province of Nova Scotia, located in the Region of Queens Municipality.
