= East Amherst, Nova Scotia =

Community in Nova Scotia, Canada

Coordinates: 45°50′55.14″N 64°10′59.99″W

East Amherst in Nova Scotia

East Amherst is a Canadian rural community located in northwestern Cumberland County, Nova Scotia near the border with New Brunswick, located on Trunk 6, immediately east of the Town of Amherst's municipal boundary.

The community is mostly small mixed-use farms, although an increasing number of homes are being constructed as Amherst experiences a small case of suburban sprawl.

The 2026 Boston Christmas Tree came from East Amherst.
