= Rockley, Nova Scotia =

Community in Nova Scotia, Canada

Rockley is a small community located in Cumberland County, Nova Scotia, Canada.
