= Kolbec =

Community in Nova Scotia, Canada

Coordinates: 45°45′45.84″N 63°49′8.02″W

Kolbec in Nova Scotia

Kolbec is a community in the Canadian province of Nova Scotia, located in Cumberland County. Most of the community lies on Route 301.

The community lies on the western bank of River Philip and has a cemetery within its boundaries.
