= Pubnico (village), Nova Scotia =

Community in Nova Scotia, Canada

Coordinates: 43°42′09″N 65°47′02″W

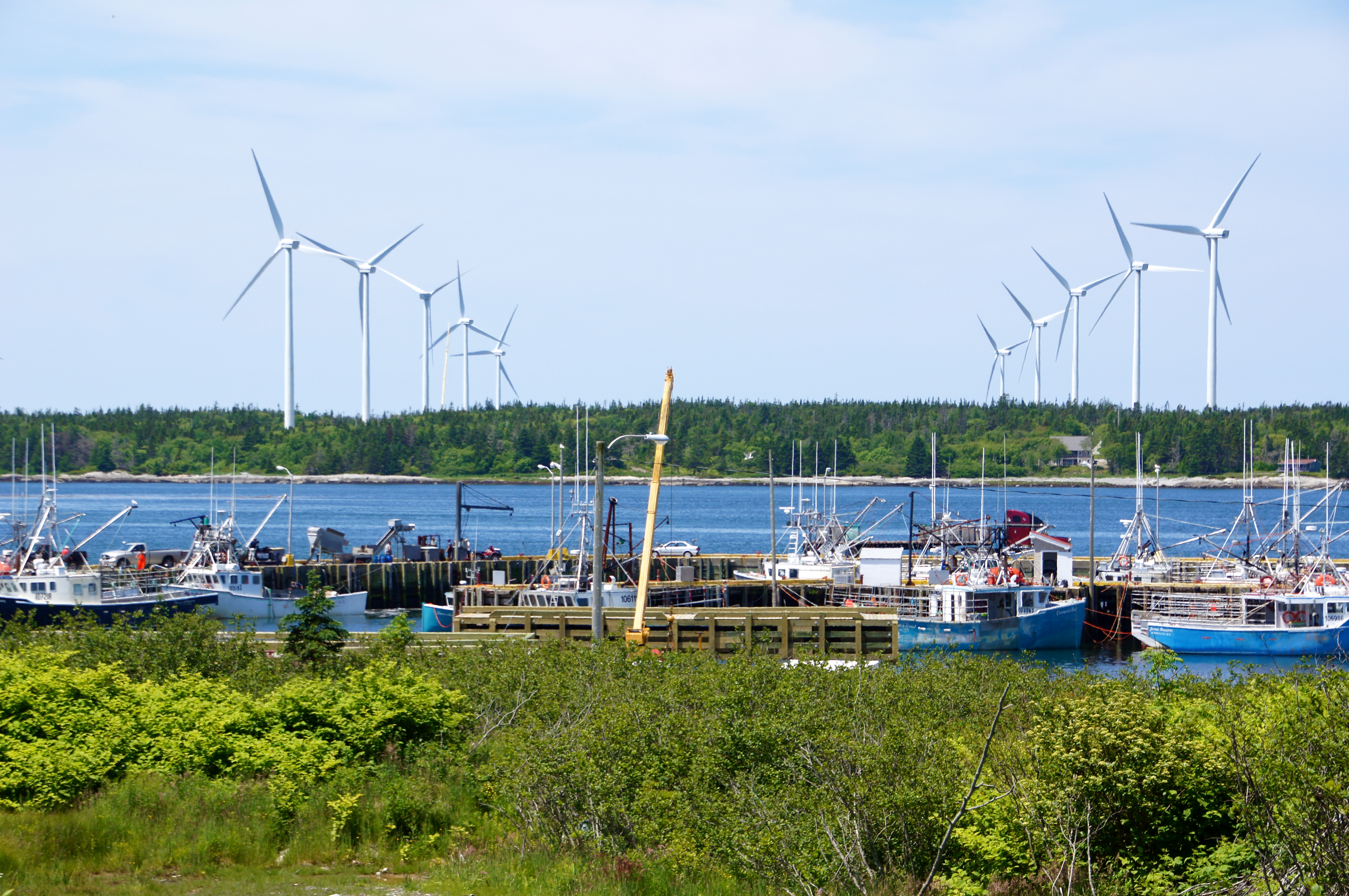
A government wharf in East Pubnico against the backdrop of the Pubnico Point Windfarm.

Pubnico is a community in the Canadian province of Nova Scotia, located in Yarmouth County.

== History ==
Pubnico was founded in 1653 by Philippe Mius d'Entremont. It is the oldest Acadian community still inhabited mainly by Acadians; most of today's residents are descendants of the founder.

== Geography ==
Pubnico consists of three sections. There is West Pubnico, whose people are almost all French speaking; Pubnico proper, better known as Pubnico Head, whose people are mostly all English speaking; and East Pubnico, the part where it is believed to have been located the barony, being occupied by English speaking people, and the rest, up to the Shelburne county line, which is occupied mostly by French speaking people.

Home to the first wind farm in Nova Scotia, Pubnico Point Wind Farm has seventeen 1.8 MW Vestas V-80 turbines with a generating capacity of 30.6 MW. Commissioned in 2005 and purchased by NextEra Energy Canada in 2008, the wind farm is one of the largest in generating capacity in the province.

West Pubnico in Nova Scotia

== Popular culture ==
Pubnico is mentioned in C. J. Ramone's song "Carry Me Away". The song tells the story of a sailor who longs to reach Pubnico to meet his beloved.

Pubnico is known for thick cookies that are historically valued because they travel well and are filling. Traditional recipes rely on affordable, historical Atlantic Canadian staples like fancy molasses (frequently associated with Crosby's Molasses), butter, sugar, milk, and a warm blend of spices like ginger, cinnamon, and cloves. Pubnico cookies were practical rations for local workers, fishers, and families. Also known by several colorful alternative names, including Long Johns, Moose Hunters, Fat Archies, and Lumberjacks.
