= Upper LaHave, Nova Scotia =

Community in Nova Scotia, Canada

Coordinates: 44°22′4.07″N 64°27′7.13″W

Upper LaHave in Nova Scotia

Upper LaHave is a community in the Canadian province of Nova Scotia, located in the Lunenburg Municipal District in Lunenburg County on the shore of the LaHave River.
