= Lennox Passage, Nova Scotia =

Community in Nova Scotia, Canada

Coordinates: 45°36′39.49″N 61°3′53.64″W

Lennox Passage in Nova Scotia

Lennox Passage is a community in the Canadian province of Nova Scotia, located in Richmond County. It borders Louisdale. It was known as Lennox Ferry, but changed its name in the early 1900s. A bridge was completed in 1919 to connect Isle Madame.

There is a submarine power cable in Lennox Passage.

There is an associated adjacent Lennox Passage Provincial Park.
