= Colpton, Nova Scotia =

Community in Nova Scotia, Canada

Coordinates: 44°27′11.76″N 64°50′29.33″W

Colpton in Nova Scotia

Colpton is a rural community in the Canadian province of Nova Scotia, located in Lunenburg County.
