= Wallace Station =

Coordinates: 45°47′6.44″N 63°29′17.95″W

Wallace Station is a small farming community located in Cumberland County, Nova Scotia, Canada.

Wallace Station was established in 1887 after the Oxford & New Glasgow Railway built its line along the north shore of Nova Scotia from the Intercolonial Railway at Oxford Junction to Pictou. In the early 1890s, the ICR took over this line and in later years it was operated as CN Rail's Oxford Subdivision.

CN abandoned passenger service through Wallace Station in 1960 and freight service in February 1986. The rails were lifted through the area by 1989.

The passenger station at Wallace Station served the nearby village of Wallace and surrounding areas. Wallace Station was also a junction between the Oxford Subdivision and a small private 3 mile spur which ran to the sandstone quarry and shipping pier at Wallace. At its peak the community had a store, post office, and one room school (later converted to an Orangeman's Hall). The local Orange Lodge has since been dissolved and in 1997, the hall was moved several miles away and is now used as a workshop.

The abandoned rail bed now serves as part of the Trans Canada Trail system.
