= Louisdale, Nova Scotia =

Louisdale
- Community
- Nickname: The Heart of Richmond County
- Location within Nova Scotia
- Coordinates: 45°36′39.49″N 61°3′53.64″W
- Country: Canada
- Province: Nova Scotia
- Municipality: Municipality of the County of Richmond

Area
  - Land: 102 km^{2} (39 sq mi)

Population (2006)
  - Total: 1,770
  - Density: 17/km^{2} (44/sq mi)
- Time zone: UTC-4 (AST)
- Postal codes: B0E 1V0
- Area code: 902
- Part of a series about Places in Nova Scotia

Louisdale (pronounced Lewisdale) is an unincorporated community in the Canadian province of Nova Scotia, located in the Municipality of the County of Richmond. It is located on Cape Breton Island at the centre of an Acadian region. Founded mainly by families from nearby Petit-de-Grat, its early settlers were primarily of Acadian and, from the early 19th century, Scottish descent. It has two schools, park areas, and places to eat catering to tourists and residents.

== History ==
Early 19th century migrants to Richmond were mainly Scottish settlers, with fishing and farming important parts of the economy. The Louisdale area was formerly known as "Barachois St. Louis" or "The Barachois", according to archival documents. To distinguish it from other communities, the name was statutorily changed by the provincial legislature on April 7, 1905. A barachois is a term used in Atlantic Canada to describe a coastal lagoon separated from the ocean by a sand bar. The term comes from a Basque word, "barratxoa", meaning "little bar". The popular derivation from the French or Acadian French barachois is without historical merit.

=== Religion ===
In 1871 there were four census districts spanning the three Roman Catholic parishes around Isle Madame. One of these districts, Petit de Grat, became a separate parish after the turn of the 20th century. Prior to that, it was part of the Arichat parish. The Louisdale region, whose founders were primarily from the Little Anse area of Petit de Grat, also came under the Arichat Notre Dame de L'Assomption parish.

The various parishes came within the diocese of Arichat. On its establishment in 1844, it was part of the Halifax diocese, which itself formed 2 years earlier (it became an archdiocese in 1852). The seat of the diocese was Notre Dame de L'Assomption, until transferred to Antigonish, its current name, on August 23, 1886. The community's religious heritage remains visible to the present day, with Louisdale one of two communities in Richmond home to a Catholic shrine.

== Education ==
There are two schools in Louisdale. Felix Marchand Education Centre, an elementary school, was built in 1967 and underwent major renovation in 1990. The Nova Scotia Department of Education published Student Assessment results on the school in 2009. Of 38 students, in the Early Elementary Mathematical Literary Assessment, 58% met expectations. In the Early Language Literary Assessment, (of 24 students) 67% met reading expectations, while 75% met expectations in narrative writing.

The newer Richmond Academy is a Grade 9–12 school. The 2009 Junior High Literary Assessment results show that of 71 students, 90 and 93% met expectations for reading and writing, respectively. The NSE Mathematics assessments saw 54% of 28 students passing, rising to 88% of 25 students for the NSE Advanced Mathematics assessment. Both institutions come under the jurisdiction of the Strait Regional School Board.

== Geology ==
The community lies in a district identified by Nova Scotia Museum of Natural History geomorphologists as an area of Sedimentary Lowland within the larger Atlantic Coast Region. The landform was carved through erosion of "weakly metamorphosed Carboniferous sandstones". These characteristics contributed to Cape Breton Island's richer freshwater habitats and areas of natural beauty. This has acted as a draw to European people purchasing homes around the county, particularly those sited near the shore. Louisdale's conservation areas and park are recognised among Sites of Special Interest by the Natural History Museum. A habitat for wildlife, Louisdale is the site of the first record in Maritime Canada of a species of winged ground beetle, Agonum crenistriatum.

== Location and population ==
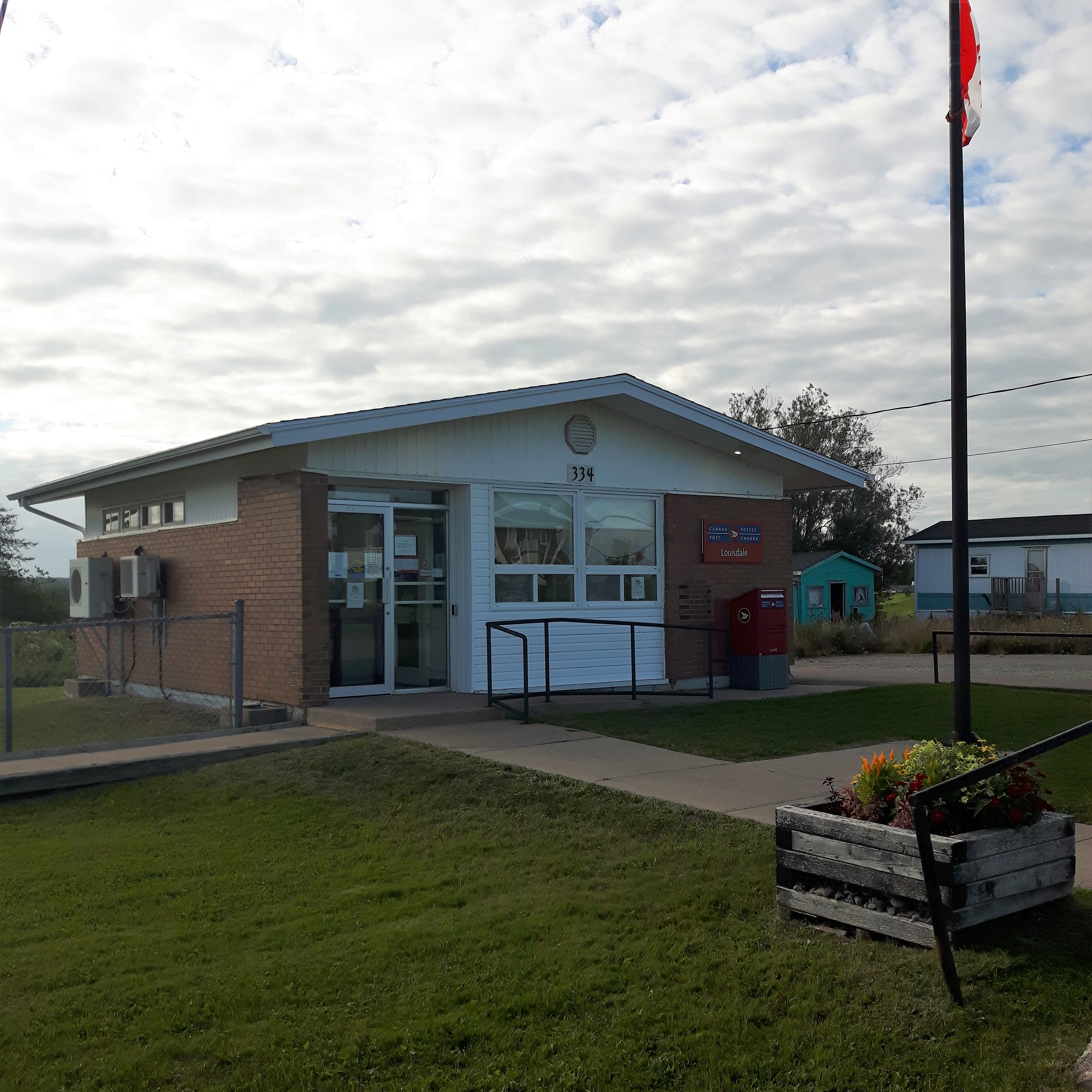
Post office building in Louisdale in 2018

Richmond, with 9,500 people, has the second smallest population density of counties in Nova Scotia; at 230,000 land acres plus its coastline, it is the smallest by area. The Louisdale population is around 1,770 according to the 2006 Canadian census, over an area of 102 km^{2}.

The community is bordered by Grand Anse, with Lennox Passage to the North. Its harbour is between St. Peter's bay and Isle Madame. Its town sign depicts the slogan "The heart of Richmond County".

== Natural resources and economy ==
The area has largely been agrarian, including lowbush blueberry cultivation, along with forestry, and fishing, though this latter has declined since the 1990s. Louisdale is one of the four in Richmond that provide central municipal water services to the county.
