= Salem, Nova Scotia =

Community in Nova Scotia, Canada

Coordinates: 45°46′2.9″N 64°7′4.6″W

Salem in Nova Scotia

Salem is a community in the Canadian province of Nova Scotia, located near Amherst in Cumberland County.
