= Middleboro, Nova Scotia =

Community in Nova Scotia, Canada

Coordinates: 45°45′19″N 63°34′38″W

Middleboro in Nova Scotia

Middleboro is a community in the Canadian province of Nova Scotia, located in Cumberland County.
