= South Brookfield, Nova Scotia =

Community in Nova Scotia, Canada

Coordinates: 44°22′51.77″N 64°57′59.84″W

South Brookfield in Nova Scotia

South Brookfield is a community in the Canadian province of Nova Scotia, located in the Region of Queens Municipality.

== Parks ==
- Cameron's Brook Provincial Park
