= Wentworth Centre =

Community in Nova Scotia, Canada

Coordinates: 45°40′20″N 63°33′13″W

Wentworth Centre in Nova Scotia

Wentworth Centre is a community located in Cumberland County, in the Canadian province of Nova Scotia.
