= Port Philip, Nova Scotia =

Community in Nova Scotia, Canada

Coordinates: 45°50′57.94″N 63°44′20.35″W

Port Philip in Nova Scotia

Port Philip is a community in the Canadian province of Nova Scotia, located in Cumberland County.
