= Martinique, Nova Scotia =

Community in Nova Scotia, Canada

Coordinates: 45°34′55.09″N 61°3′14.82″W

Martinique in Nova Scotia

Martinique is a community in the Canadian province of Nova Scotia, located in Richmond County. The community is named in commemoration of the Invasion of Martinique (1809).
