= Head of Wallace Bay, Nova Scotia =

Locality in Nova Scotia, Canada

Coordinates: 45°48′58″N 63°35′6″W

Head of Wallace Bay in Nova Scotia

Head of Wallace Bay is a locality in the Canadian province of Nova Scotia, located in Cumberland County.
