= Streets Ridge =

Community in Nova Scotia, Canada

Coordinates: 45°43′5″N 63°38′35″W

Streets Ridge in Nova Scotia

Streets Ridge is a community in the Canadian province of Nova Scotia, located in Cumberland County.
