= Southampton, Nova Scotia =

Community in Nova Scotia, Canada

Coordinates: 45°35′20.82″N 64°14′41.54″W

Southampton in Nova Scotia

Southampton is a community in the Canadian province of Nova Scotia, located in Cumberland County. It has two roads leading up to it, Route 2 and Route 302. In Southampton, Nova Scotia there is the Elizabeth House General Store, which opened in 1923.
