= Oxford, Nova Scotia =

Oxford
- Town
- Town of Oxford
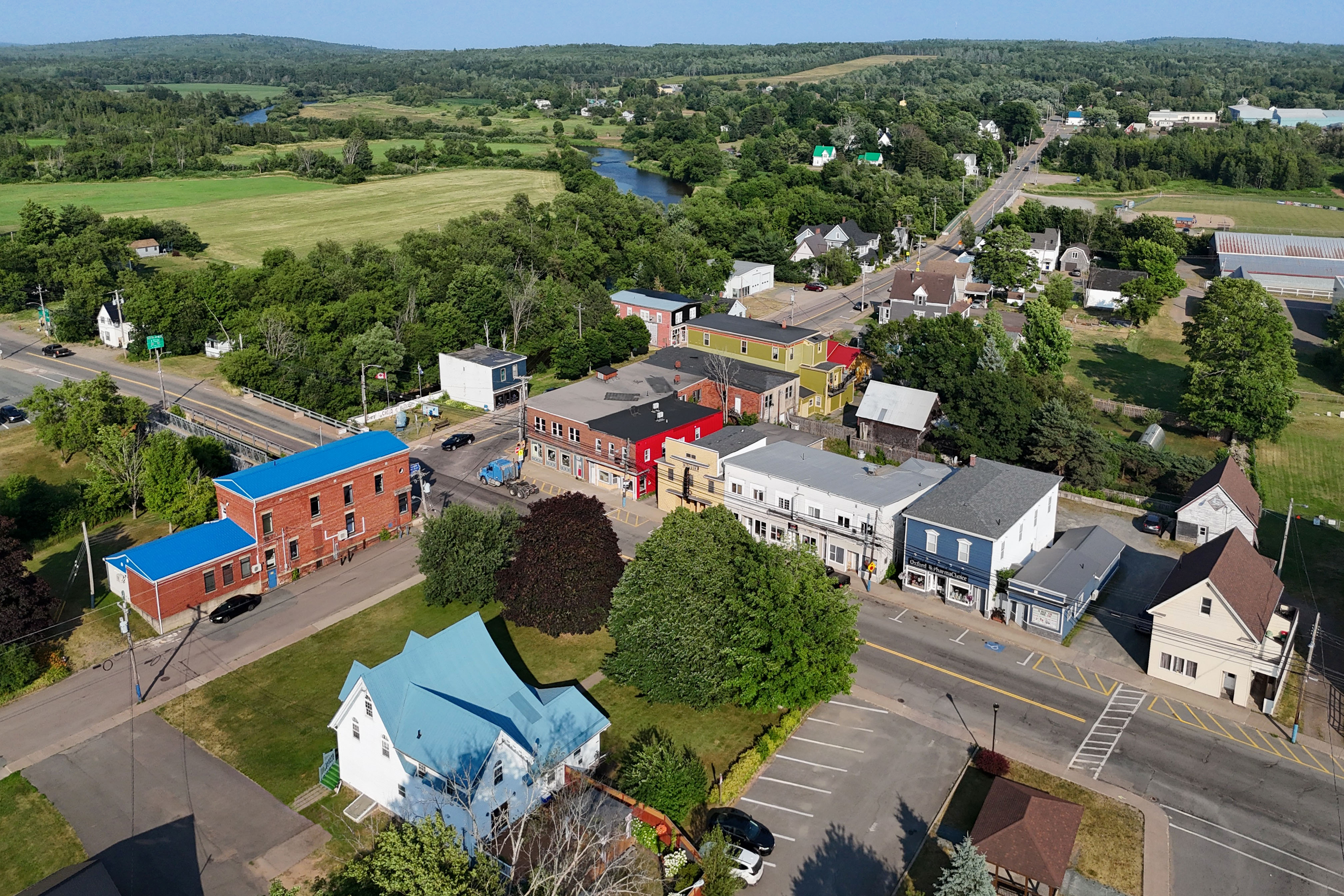
- Downtown

- Seal
- Nickname: Wild Blueberry Capital of Canada
- Location of Oxford
- Coordinates: 45°44′11″N 63°52′02″W
- Country: Canada
- Province: Nova Scotia
- Municipality: Cumberland County
- Founded: 1791
- Incorporated: April 19, 1904
- Electoral Districts Federal: Cumberland-Colchester-Musquodoboit Valley
- Provincial: Cumberland South

Government
  - Mayor: Gregory Henley
  - Governing Body: Oxford Town Council
  - MLA: Tory Rushton

Area (2021)
  - Total: 10.68 km^{2} (4.12 sq mi)
- Highest elevation: 18 m (59 ft)
- Lowest elevation: 5 m (16 ft)

Population (2021)
  - Total: 1,170
  - Density: 109.6/km^{2} (284/sq mi)
- Time zone: UTC-4 (AST)
  - Summer (DST): UTC-3 (ADT)
- Postal code: B0M
- Area code: 902
- Telephone Exchange: 447, 552
- Median Earnings*: $60,400
- Website: oxfordns.ca
- Median household income, 2020 ($) (all households)

Oxford is a town in Cumberland County, Nova Scotia, Canada. It is 32 km (20 mi) east of Amherst. The town is directly serviced by Routes 104, 204, 301, and 321. Despite its small size and demographic, Oxford is the world's largest processor and distributor of individually quick frozen (IQF) wild blueberries.

== History ==
Oxford was founded in 1792 by settler Richard Thompson. The name "Oxford" is derived from the shallow river that was used to enter the town. Early settlers used oxen to cross, or "ford", the river, and thus derived the town's name.

== Geography ==
Oxford is located at the junctions of three rivers, the largest of which is the River Philip. Much of the town lies in a floodplain and floods are common during the springtime. Salt Lake is located between the Black River Road and the Trans Canada Highway. A series of swamps and meadows connect this lake to the River Philip.

== Demographics ==
In the 2021 Census of Population conducted by Statistics Canada, Oxford had a population of 1,170 living in 533 of its 576 total private dwellings, a change of −1.7% from its 2016 population of 1,190. With a land area of 10.68 km^{2} (4.12 sq mi), it had a population density of 109.6/km^{2} (283.7/sq mi) in 2021.

== Industry ==
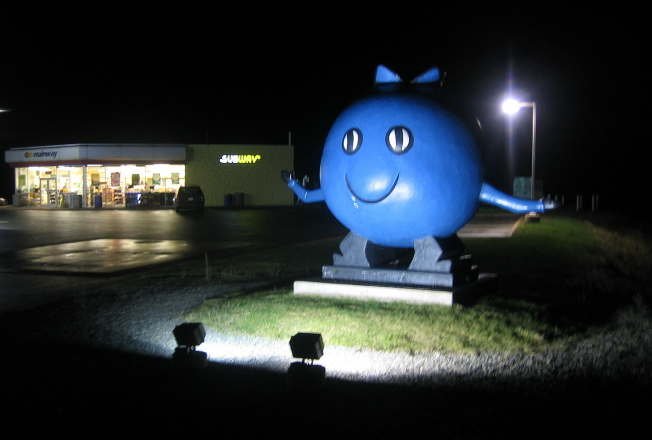
A giant blueberry statue makes a distinctive entry feature for the community

Oxford is considered the wild blueberry capital of Canada as it is centred in a large blueberry growing region. Oxford Frozen Foods Ltd., a wild blueberry processor, is the largest employer in the town, processing up to three million pounds of berries a day during peak season. The plant and over 12,000 acres of blueberry land are owned by local businessman, John Bragg, who added in 2014 another 15,700 acres in the Acadian region of northern New Brunswick.

Historically, the town was home to a vibrant manufacturing industry with a woollen mill and foundry being key employers.

== Transportation ==
Centrally located in Cumberland County, Oxford is well connected to the provincial and national road network.

The Trans Canada Highway (Highway 104) passed near just south of the town and provincial routes 204, 301, and 321 all travel through town via Pugwash Road, Birchwood Road, Water Street, Upper/Lower Main Street and Little River Road.

In terms of public transport, the town is serviced by Maritime Bus, which stops at the Irving gas station not far off the highway.

Historically, the town had freight and passenger rail service via CN's Oxford Subdivision, known locally as the 'Short Line', which ran from Oxford Junction to Stellarton. Passenger service was discontinued in 1960 and the line was abandoned in the 1990s.

The abandoned rail line has been reborn as a part of the Trans Canada Trail system. This section of the trail extends 127-km (78-mi) from Oxford to Pictou. It winds through farms, fields and forests for all season recreational use.

== See also ==
- List of municipalities in Nova Scotia
- Oxford Regional High School
