= Upper Nappan =

Community in Nova Scotia, Canada

Coordinates: 45°47′1″N 64°11′48″W

Upper Nappan in Nova Scotia

Upper Nappan is a community in the Canadian province of Nova Scotia, located in Cumberland County.

== Notable people ==
- Roger Stuart Bacon, politician and dairy farmer
