= Old Barns =

Community in Nova Scotia, Canada

Coordinates: 45°20′44″N 63°23′51″W

Old Barns in Nova Scotia

Old Barns is an unincorporated community in the Canadian province of Nova Scotia, located in Colchester County. The name "Old Barns" was being used to describe the area as early as February 1784.

Upon the arrival of British settlers, there were only two French barns remaining of prior settlements in the area. The lower area of Truro was named "Barn Village" after these barns. The barns were torn down in the late 1820s.

== Bibliography ==
- Burrows, Mildred Pulsifer (1985). A history of Clifton and Old Barns in Colchester County. Truro, Nova Scotia: Colchester Historical Museum. OCLC 16179818.
