= Green Oaks, Nova Scotia =

Community in Nova Scotia, Canada

Coordinates: 45°15′1.51″N 63°26′7.14″W

Green Oaks in Nova Scotia

Green Oaks is an unincorporated community in the Canadian province of Nova Scotia, located in Colchester County.
