= Port Howe =

Community in Nova Scotia, Canada

Coordinates: 45°51′11.72″N 63°45′6.39″W

Port Howe in Nova Scotia

Port Howe is a community in the Canadian province of Nova Scotia, located in Cumberland County. The community is named after William Howe, 5th Viscount Howe.

== Parks ==
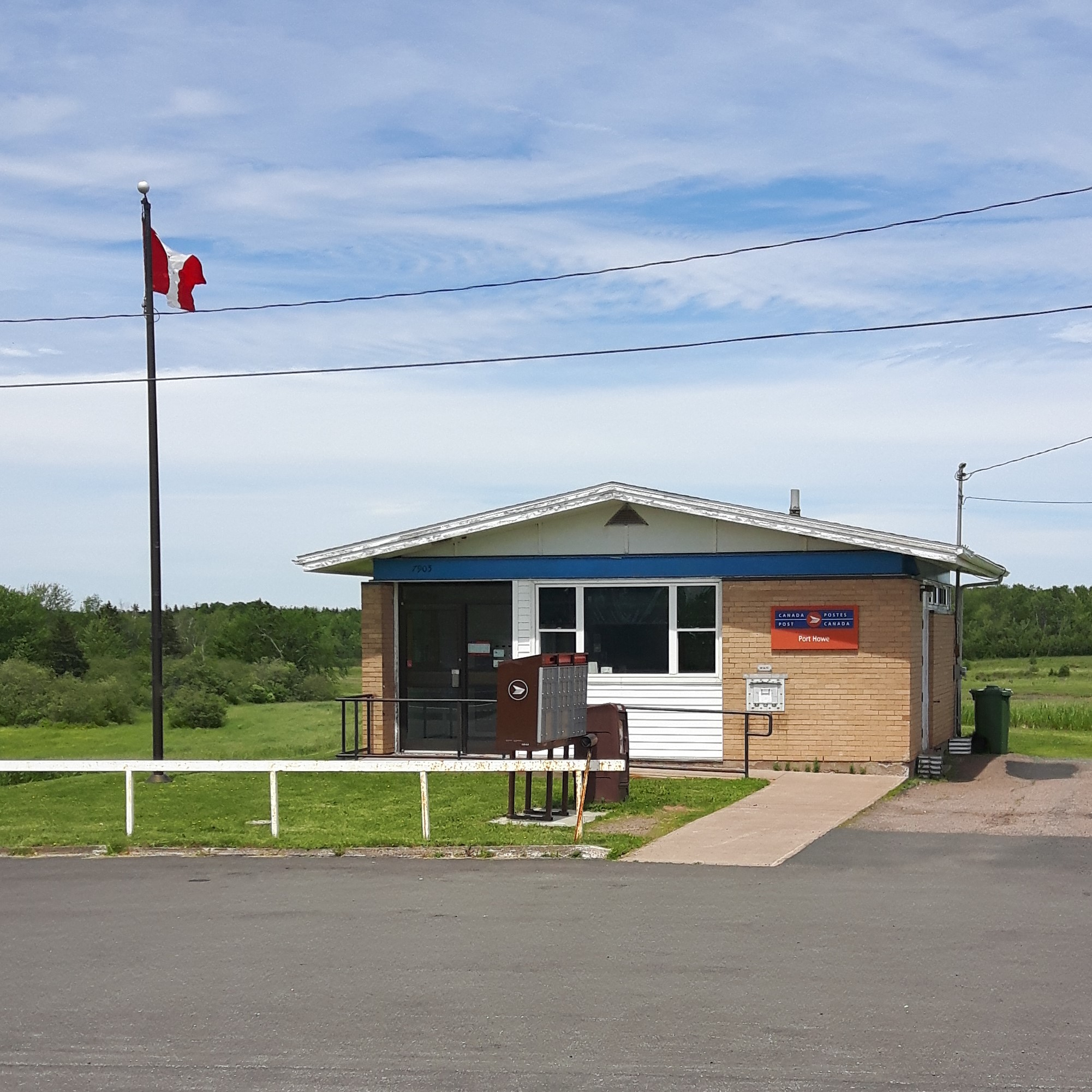
Federal post office building in Port Howe

- Gulf Shore Provincial Park
- Heather Beach Provincial Park
