= Nova Scotia Department of Public Works =

Government department

Department of Public Works
Government department overview
- Formed: 1918; 108 years ago
- Minister responsible: Fred Tilley
- Deputy Minister responsible: Paul LaFleche

The Department of Public Works of the Government of Nova Scotia is responsible for transportation, communications, construction, property, and accommodation of government departments and agencies in the province.

Fred Tilley is its current minister. The department has over 2,000 employees responsible for implementing its mandate.

== History ==
The department was established in 1918 as the Department of Highways. In 1926, the Provincial Highway Board was abolished, and the Department of Highways took up responsibility for road building, traffic management, as well as tourism.

In 1939, the department assumed responsibility for government property, and was renamed Department of Highways and Public Works. It was renamed Department of Transportation in 1979.

It was renamed several times thereon, to Transportation and Communications (1987); Transportation and Public Works (1996), when it absorbed functions of the former Department of Supply and Services; and Transportation and Infrastructure Renewal (2007).

In early 2021, the then-Department of Transportation and Infrastructure Renewal (TIR) was renamed to Department of Transportation and Active Transit (TAT). After the election of the Houston government later in 2021, the department was given its present name.

== Operational Units ==
- Highway operations
- Public Works division
- Real property services
- Government Services division
- Government service's corporate IT operations
- Corporate Policy branch
- Corporate Services branch
- Public Safety Communications Services Program Office
- Environmental services
- Trucking
  - Truck regulatory review
  - Vehicle compliance
  - B-Train routes

== Responsibilities ==
The Department of Transportation and Infrastructure Renewal is responsible for:

- 23,000 kilometres of road including the Cobequid Pass
- 4,100 bridges except those under the Halifax Dartmouth Bridge Commission
  - 200 steel truss bridges
- 800 pieces of equipment
- 7 ferries
- 53 garages
- 5 scale houses
- 44 Road Weather Information Systems and highway cameras
- Manages the Dangerous Goods Transportation Act, which regulates the transportation of dangerous goods such as chemicals, hazardous waste and explosives
- Public safety radio services
  - Nova Scotia Integrated Mobile Radio System (NSIMRS)
  - Trunked Mobile Radio System (TMRS)

== See also ==
- List of Nova Scotia provincial highways
- Transport Canada
