= List of communities in Hants County, Nova Scotia =

List of communities in Hants County, Nova Scotia

Communities are ordered by the highway on which they are located, whose routes start after each terminus near the largest community.

== Trunk routes ==
- Trunk 1: Hantsport - Mount Denson - Falmouth - Windsor - Three Mile Plains - Newport Station - St Croix - Newport Corner - Ardoise - Lakelands - Mount Uniacke
- Trunk 14: Vaughan - Smith's Corner - Windsor Forks - Ardoise - Sweet's Corner - Brooklyn - Woodville - Centre Rawdon - Rawdon Gold Mines - Upper Rawdon - Upper Nine Mile River - Nine Mile River - Hardwood Lands - Milford

== Collector roads ==
- Route 202: Lakelands - Hillsvale - South Rawdon - Centre Rawdon - West Gore - Gore - East Gore
- Route 214: Belnan
- Route 215: Shubenacadie - Admiral Rock - Urbania - South Maitland - Maitland - Selma - Noel Shore - East Noel - Noel - Minasville - Moose Brook - Tenecape - Walton - Pembroke - Cambridge - Bramber - Cheverie - Kempt Shore- Summerville - Centre Burlington - Brooklyn - Newport Corner
- Route 236: Scotch Village - Riverside Corner - Stanley - Clarksville - Riverside Corner - Kennetcook - Upper Kennetcook - Five Mile River - Lattie's Brook - South Maitland
- Route 354: Noel - Gormanville - North Noel Road - Noel Road - Kennetcook - Gore - Upper Rawdon-

== Rural roads ==
- Avondale
- Barr Settlement
- Belmont
- Burtons
- Cogmagun River
- East Uniacke
- Ellershouse
- Five Mile Plains
- Georgefield
- Indian Brook 14
- Leminster
- Maple Grove
- MacPhees Corner
- Mosherville
- Newport Landing
- Northfield
- Renfrew
- South Uniacke
- Stillwater
- Three Mile Plains
- Upper Falmouth
- White Settlement
