= Nova Scotia Route 215 =

Highway in Nova Scotia, Canada

Route 215

Route information
- Maintained by Nova Scotia Department of Transportation and Infrastructure Renewal
- Length: 120 km (75 mi)

Major junctions
- West end: Trunk 1 at Newport Corner
- Trunk 14 in Brooklyn; Route 236 near Brooklyn; Route 354 in Noel; Route 236 in South Maitland; Hwy 102 in Shubenacadie
- East end: Trunk 2 in Shubenacadie

Location
- Country: Canada
- Province: Nova Scotia
- Counties: Hants

Highway system
- Provincial highways in Nova Scotia; 100-series
← Route 214	→ Route 216

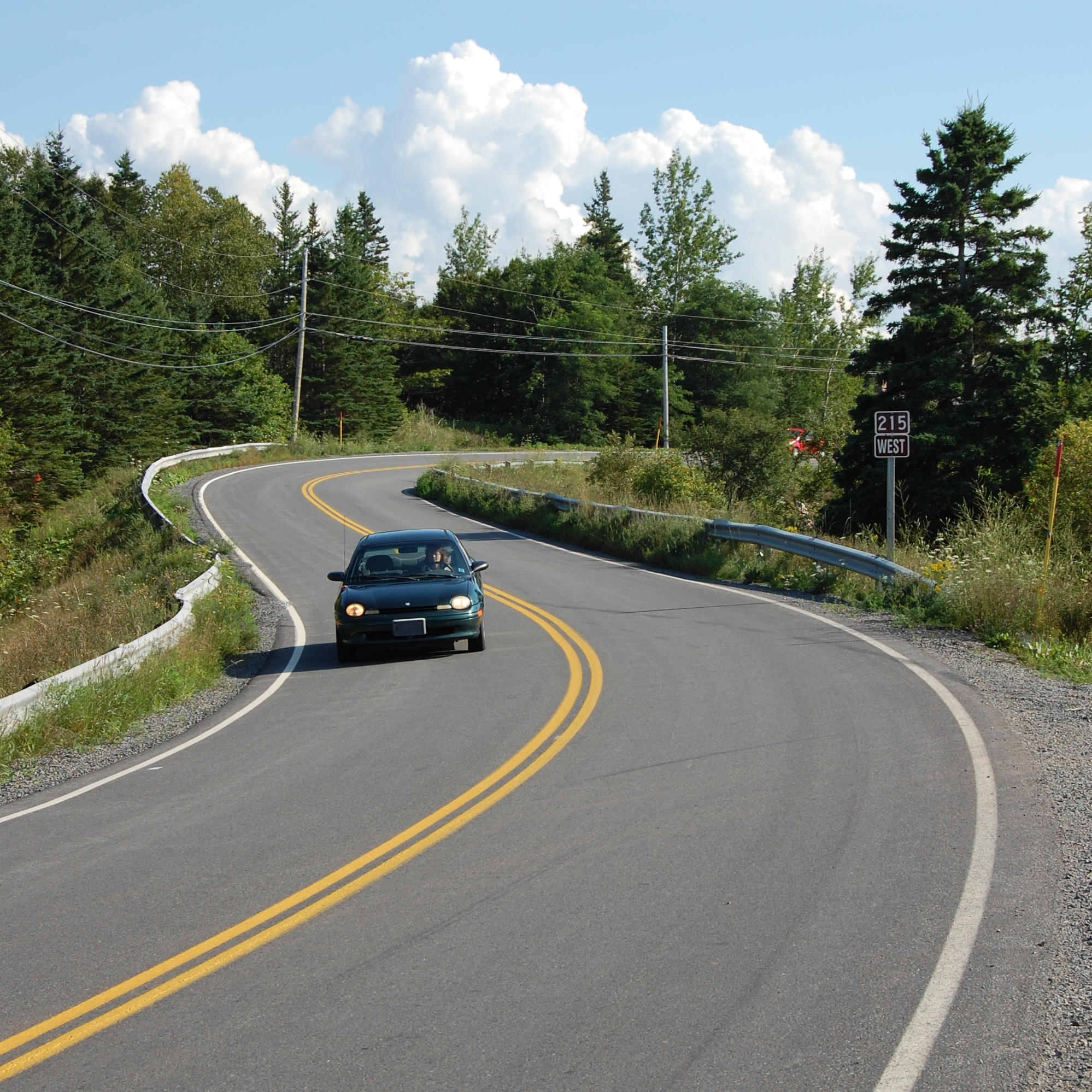
Route 215 in Chevarie, Nova Scotia

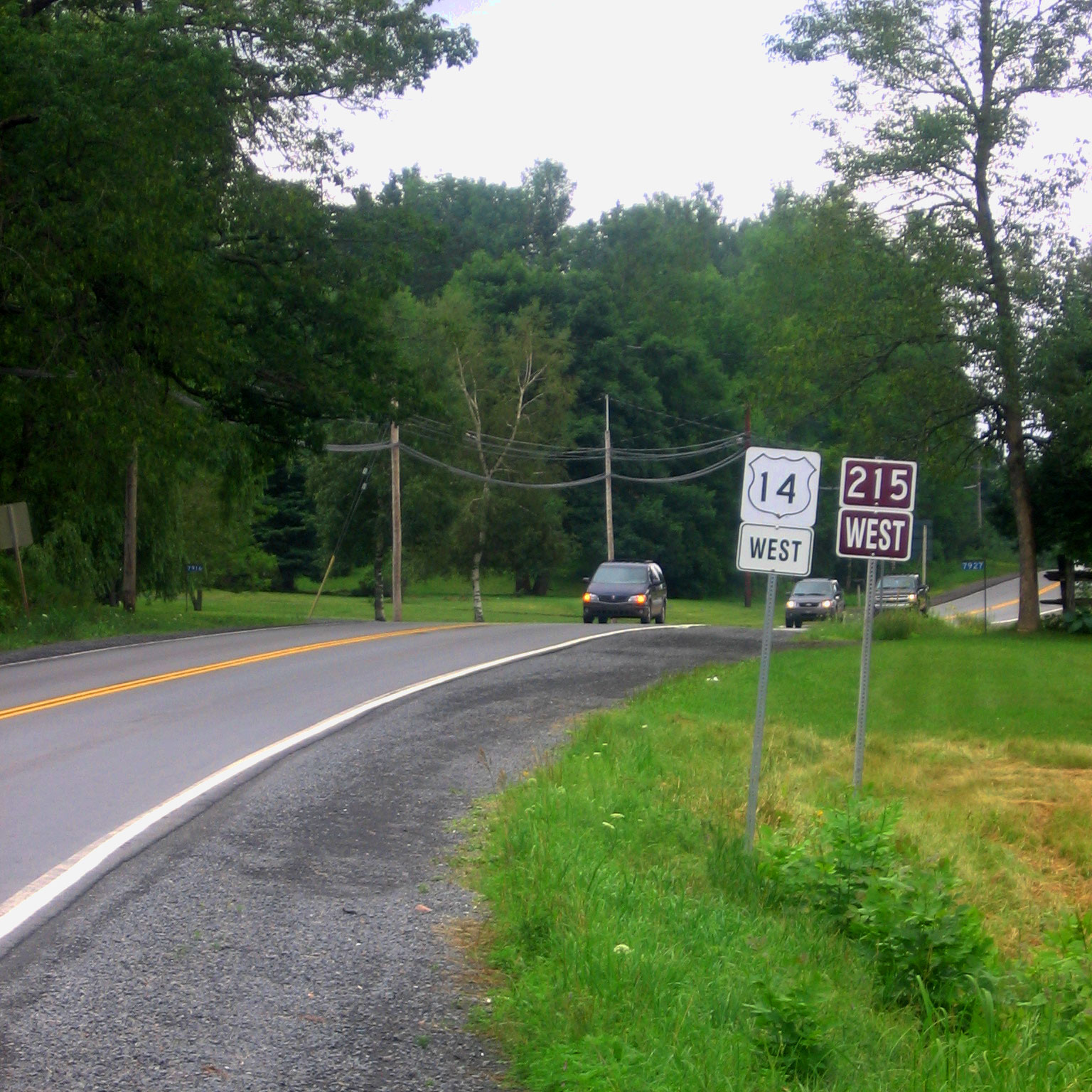
Section of NS Route 215 through Brooklyn duplexed with Trunk 14

Route 215 is an east-west collector highway in the southwest of the Canadian province of Nova Scotia.

It is located in Hants County, connecting Shubenacadie at Trunk 2 with Newport Corner at Trunk 1.

Portions of the road are included in the Glooscap Trail and the Fundy Shore Ecotour. A short portion of the road in the community of Brooklyn is duplexed with Trunk 14.

== Route ==
Route 215 beings at Newport Corner, on Trunk 1, about 20 kilometers southeast of Windsor. It begins by connecting with Brooklyn, going north. It then forms a short multiplex with Trunk 14, afterwards it follows the coast of Fundy Bay and of Cobequid Bay for more than 80 km. It then follows the river bank west of River Shubenacadie for the rest of its length (about 30 km). The route then finally crosses Highway 102 at Exit 10, where it then terminates at Trunk 2.

== Geographic regions ==
The road passes through the following geographic regions:

- the Shubenacadie Valley
- the shore of the Bay of Fundy, specifically the southern shore of Cobequid Bay and the Minas Basin
- the lower portion of the Avon Valley as it follows the east bank of the Avon River

== Communities ==
Communities in italics are served by the route indirectly.

- Newport Corner
- Brooklyn
- Belmont
- Upper Burlington
- Centre Burlington
- Cogmagun River
- Riverside
- Lower Burlington
- Summerville
- Kempt Shore
- Cheverie
- Bramber
- Cambridge
- Goshen
- Pembroke
- Walton
- East Walton
- Tenecape
- Moose Brook
- Minasville
- Burntcoat
- Noel
- Lake Road
- East Noel
- Northfield
- Densmore Mills
- Noel Shore
- Lower Selma
- Stirling Brook
- Selma
- Maitland
- South Maitland
- Urbania
- Admiral Rock
- Rines Creek
- Shubenacadie

== Parks ==
- Caddell Rapids Provincial Park
- Anthony Provincial Park
- Smiley’s Provincial Park

== History ==
Highway 215 was formerly designated Trunk Highway 15.

== See also ==
- List of Nova Scotia provincial highways

== Sources ==
- MapArt (2008). Canada back road atlas / atlas des rangs et chemins. Oshawa, Ontario: MapArt Publishing. ISBN 978-1-55368-614-9.
