= Nova Scotia Trunk 1 =

Highway in Nova Scotia

Trunk 1
- Evangeline Trail
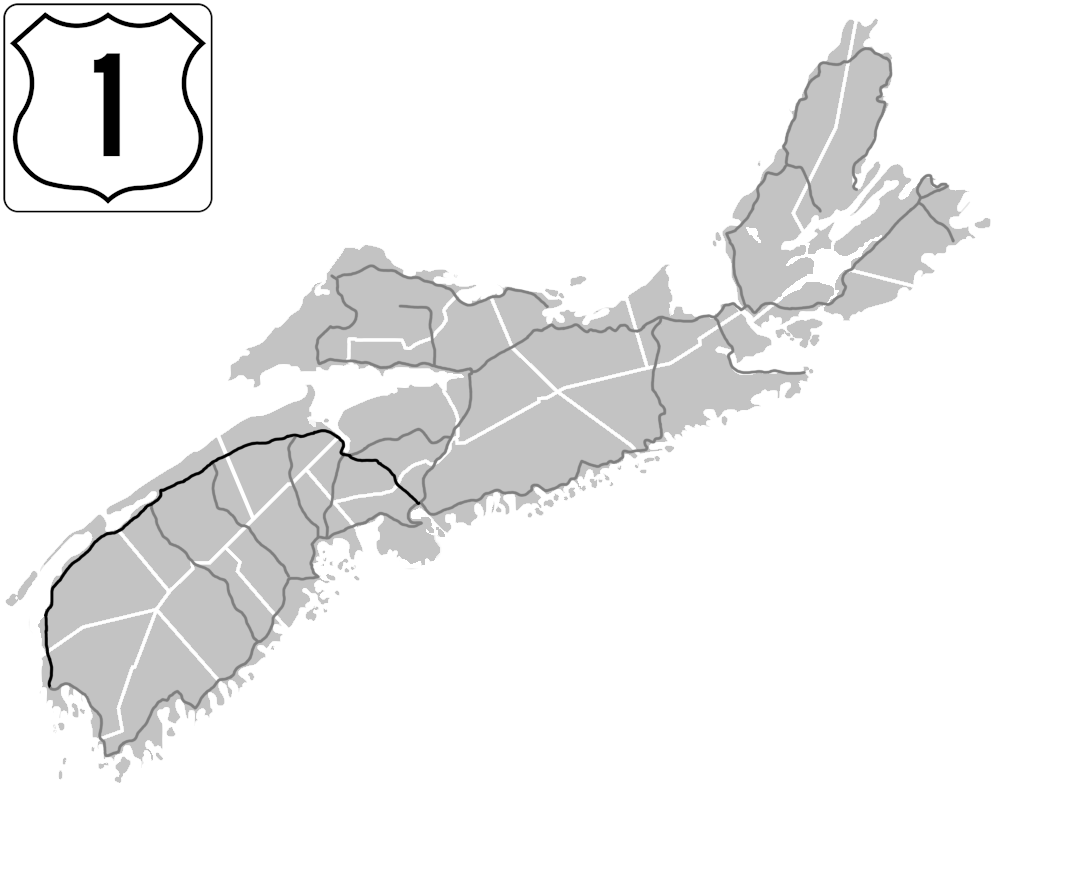

Route information
- Maintained by Nova Scotia Department of Transportation and Infrastructure Renewal
- Length: 327.5 km (203.5 mi)

Major junctions
- East end: Trunk 2 in Bedford
- Hwy 101 / Hwy 102 in Bedford; Trunk 14 in Windsor; Trunk 12 in Kentville; Trunk 10 in Middleton; Trunk 8 in Annapolis Royal; Trunk 3 in Yarmouth
- West end: Yarmouth Ferry Terminal

Location
- Country: Canada
- Province: Nova Scotia
- Counties: Annapolis, Digby, Hants, Kings, Halifax Regional Municipality, Yarmouth
- Towns: Annapolis Royal, Bridgetown, Digby, Hantsport, Kentville, Middleton, New Minas, Windsor, Wolfville

Highway system
- Provincial highways in Nova Scotia; 100-series
← Route 395	→ Trunk 2

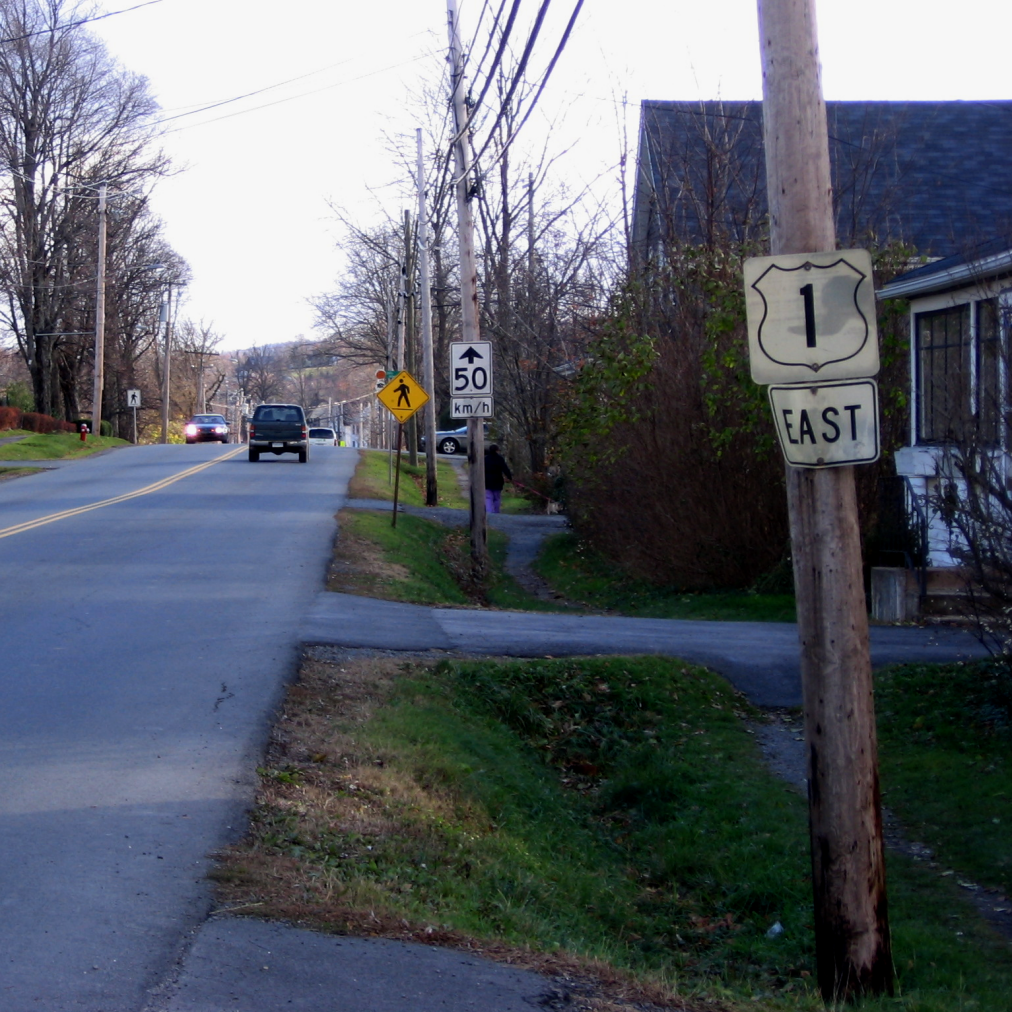
Nova Scotia Trunk 1 as it passes through the town of Windsor

Trunk 1 is part of the Canadian province of Nova Scotia's system of Trunk Highways.

It is located in the western part of the province and connects Bedford with Yarmouth via the Annapolis Valley. It was known for many years as "the Post Road". The route runs parallel to, and in some places has been replaced by, Highway 101. Trunk 1 often forms the main street in communities that Highway 101 bypasses.

The highway is 323 km (201 mi) in length and hosts the Evangeline Trail scenic travelway for its entire length, as well as the Glooscap Trail scenic travelway for a section between Windsor and Wolfville.

Just east of Windsor, between Garlands Crossing and Currys Corner, Trunk 1 and Trunk 14 are duplexed for about 2 km.

== Route description ==
In the Halifax Regional Municipality, Trunk 1 starts in Bedford at the intersection of Rocky Lake Drive and the Bedford Highway on Trunk 2. It is known as Sackville Drive and is the main street through the community of Lower Sackville. The road continues northwest through Middle Sackville, Upper Sackville, and Mount Uniacke to Windsor, where it meets the Avon River. Trunk 1 follows the west bank of the river through Hantsport. At Avonport, Trunk 1 turns west through the Annapolis Valley, following the south bank of the Cornwallis River through Wolfville, New Minas and Kentville.

Bypassing the town of Berwick to the south, Trunk 1 meets the Annapolis River at Aylesford, and runs along the river's north bank through Kingston, Middleton, Lawrencetown and Bridgetown. The road crosses the Annapolis River at Annapolis Royal (on the Annapolis Royal Generating Station), and runs along the southern coast of the Annapolis Basin through Upper Clements and the former site of CFB Cornwallis.

Trunk 1 joins up with Highway 101 at Deep Brook to cross the Bear River, then splits apart to loop through the village of Smith's Cove, across from the town of Digby. Trunk 1 joins up at the western end of this loop, with Highway 101 assuming Trunk 1's former alignment along St. Mary's Bay. A new controlled-access segment of Highway 101 is proposed for this area; and it is assumed Trunk 1 will be re-signed along this stretch if completed.

At Weymouth, Trunk 1 re-appears, and continues south along the coast through the Municipality of Clare to its end in downtown Yarmouth on Main Street at the ferry terminal to Bar Harbor, Maine where it meets the Trunk 3.

== History ==
Trunk 1 is the oldest major road in the province of Nova Scotia. It began as a trail connecting Acadian communities but was expanded by the British as link between the garrison of Annapolis Royal and the provincial capital of Halifax. It was upgraded to a road and became known in the 19th century as "the Great Western Road" connecting Halifax to its westward hinterland. It became known as "the post road" in the Annapolis Valley because of its use for mail delivery and stage coach service. The name "the post road" persists in some circles but today it is more commonly nicknamed "the old number one" in contrast to the newer Highway 101. "Old Windsor Highway" and Rural Route 4 (R.R.4) are also previous designations. A 4.5 km section of the road from its stage coach era has been preserved at the Uniacke Estate Museum Park in Mount Uniacke, Nova Scotia, now used as a hiking trail after was bypassed by late 19th century rerouting. In 1970, Highway Had a new eastern terminus to Bedford, preventing the coincidences to both highway 2 & 3 which they still began in Halifax. Highway 1 did end in Halifax until the Mackay Bridge opened. This highway used to go 350 kilometres (220 mi).

== Major intersections ==
County	Location	km	mi	Exit	Destinations	Notes
Halifax	Bedford	−0.2	−0.12		Trunk 2 south (Bedford Highway) – Halifax Trunk 7 north (Dartmouth Road) – Dartmouth	Roadway continues as Bedford Highway (Trunk 2 south)
Halifax	Bedford	0.0	0.0		Trunk 2 north (Rocky Lane Drive) – Waverley	Trunk 1 eastern terminus
Halifax	Bedford	1.0– 2.1	0.62– 1.3	1G/H	Hwy 102 – Halifax International Airport, Truro, Halifax	Signed as exits 1G (south) and 1H (north); Hwy 102 exits 4A/B
Halifax	Bedford	1.0– 2.1	0.62– 1.3		Bedford Bypass (Trunk 33 east) to Trunk 7 east – Dartmouth	Eastbound exit, westbound entrance
Halifax	Lower Sackville	1.0– 2.1	0.62– 1.3		Hwy 101 west – Windsor, Annapolis Valley	Westbound exit, eastbound entrance; Hwy 101 exit 1K
Halifax	Lower Sackville	6.1	3.8		Route 354 (Beaver Bank Road) – Middle Sackville	
Hants	Lakelands	30.4	18.9		Route 202 east – Hillsvale, Rawdon, Gore	
Hants	Newport Corner	40.2	25.0		Route 215 east – Brooklyn, Stanley, Walton	
Hants	St. Croix	43.2– 44.0	26.8– 27.3		Hwy 101 – Windsor, Yarmouth, Halifax	Hwy 101 exit 4
Hants	Garlands Crossing	51.9	32.2		Trunk 14 east – Rawdon, Milford	East end of Trunk 14 concurrency
Hants	Windsor	47.3	29.4		Trunk 14 west – Martock, Windsor Forks, Chester	West end of Trunk 14 concurrency
Hants	Windsor	56.8	35.3	Crosses the Avon River		
Kings	Avonport	75.3	46.8		Hwy 101 east – Hantsport, Halifax	East end of Hwy 101 concurrency; Hwy 101 exit 9
Kings	Grand Pré	78.0	48.5		Hwy 101 west – Kentville, Yarmouth	West end of Hwy 101 concurrency; Hwy 101 exit 10
Kings	Greenwich	77.3	48.0		Route 358 north / Ridge Road – Port Williams, Canning, The Lookoff, Kingsport	
Kings	Kentville	95.6	59.4		Trunk 12 south – Kentville, North Alton, South Alton, New Ross	
Kings	Kentville	95.9– 96.1	59.6– 59.7		Route 341 north / Route 359 north (Cornwallis Street / Aberdeen Street)	One-way pair, northbound follows Cornwallis St, southbound follows Abderdeen St
Kings	Coldbrook	101.7	63.2		Hwy 101 – Berwick, Middleton, Yarmouth, New Minas, Wolfville, Halifax	Hwy 101 exit 14
Kings	Berwick	116.0	72.1		Route 360 north – Harbourville	
Kings	Kingston	130.1	80.8		Route 201 west – Greenwood	
Annapolis	Middleton	146.0	90.7		Route 362 north (Commercial Street) – Margaretsville	
Annapolis	Middleton	146.1	90.8		Trunk 10 south (Bridge Street) – Bridgewater	
Annapolis	Bridgetown	166.1	103.2		Hwy 101 – Annapolis Royal, Yarmouth, Middleton, Halifax	Hwy 101 exit 20
Annapolis	Granville Ferry	190.5	118.4	Crosses the Annapolis River		
Annapolis	Annapolis Royal	192.5	119.6		Trunk 8 south to Route 201 – Lequille, Kejimkujik National Park	
Annapolis		212.7– 214.1	132.2– 133.0		Hwy 101 east – Annapolis Royal, Halifax	East end of Hwy 101 concurrency; Hwy 101 exit 23
Annapolis–Digby county boundary		215.0	133.6	Crosses the Bear River		
Digby	Bear River	215.6	134.0		Hwy 101 west – Digby, Yarmouth	West end of Hwy 101 concurrency; Hwy 101 exit 24
Digby	Joggin Bridge	219.8	136.6		Hwy 101 east – Annapolis Royal, Halifax	East end of Hwy 101 concurrency; Hwy 101 exit 25
Digby	Joggin Bridge	220.2	136.8	Joggin Bridge crosses The Joggins/Big Joggins (Annapolis Basin)		
Digby	Digby	222.6	138.3	26	Route 303 north to Route 217 – Digby, Saint John Ferry	
Digby		246.3	153.0		Hwy 101 west – Yarmouth	At-grade; west end of Hwy 101 concurrency; Hwy 101 exit 27
Digby	Weymouth	251.6	156.3	Crosses the Sissiboo River		
Digby	Weymouth	252.2	156.7		Route 340 south – Weaver Settlement, New France, Weymouth Falls	
Digby	St. Bernard	254.6	158.2		Hwy 101 – Meteghan, Yarmouth, Digby, Halifax	Hwy 101 exit 28
Yarmouth	Hebron	320.6	199.2		Route 340 north – Deerfield, Carleton	
Yarmouth	Yarmouth	325.4	202.2		Vancouver Street (Route 304 south) / Chestnut Street – Cape Forchu	
Yarmouth	Yarmouth	325.8	202.4		Starrs Road (Trunk 3 east) to Hwy 101 / Hwy 103 – Arcadia, Halifax	
Yarmouth	Yarmouth	327.5	203.5		Yarmouth Ferry Terminal	Western terminus
Gulf of Maine				Ferry to Bar Harbor, Maine (closed in winter)		
1.000 mi = 1.609 km; 1.000 km = 0.621 mi: Closed/former; Concurrency terminus; Incomplete access; Tolled

== Communities ==
- Bedford
- Lower Sackville
- Middle Sackville
- Upper Sackville
- Mount Uniacke
- Lakelands
- Ardoise
- Newport Corner
- Ellershouse
- St. Croix
- Newport Station
- Three Mile Plains
- Garlands Crossing
- Windsor
- Falmouth
- Mount Denson
- Hantsport
- Hants Border
- Lockhartville
- Avonport
- Hortonville
- Grand Pre
- Lower Wolfville
- Wolfville
- Greenwich
- New Minas
- Kentville
- Coldbrook
- Cambridge
- Waterville
- South Berwick
- Berwick West
- Aylesford East
- Aylesford
- Auburn
- East Kingston
- Kingston
- Wilmot
- Middleton
- Brickton
- Lawrencetown
- Paradise
- Bridgetown East
- Bridgetown
- Upper Granville
- Bellisle
- Granville Centre

== See also ==
- List of Nova Scotia provincial highways
