= Nova Scotia Trunk 14 =

Highway in Nova Scotia, Canada

Trunk 14

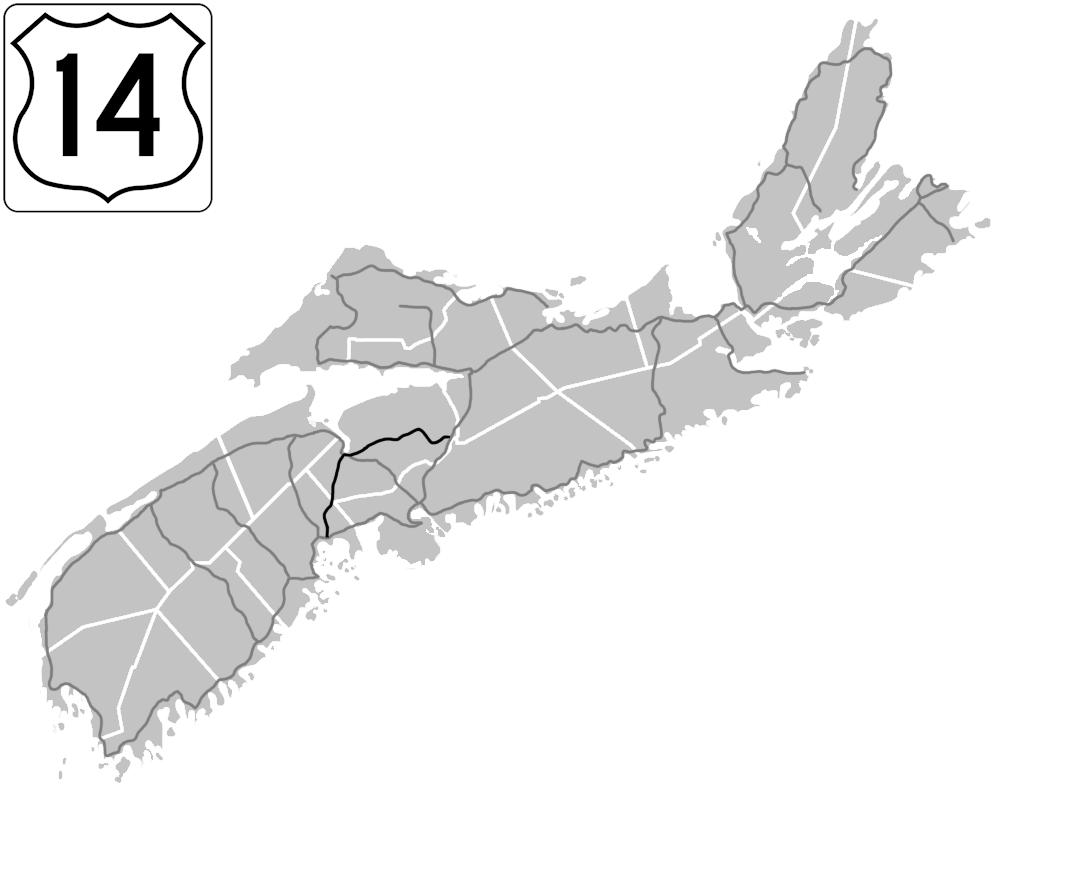

Route information
- Maintained by Nova Scotia Department of Transportation and Infrastructure Renewal
- Length: 120.7 km (75.0 mi)

Major junctions
- West end: Trunk 3 near Chester
- Hwy 103 near Chester; Trunk 1 in Windsor; Hwy 101 near Garlands Crossing; Hwy 102 near Milford Station
- East end: Trunk 2 in Milford Station

Location
- Country: Canada
- Province: Nova Scotia
- Counties: Hants, Lunenburg
- Towns: Windsor

Highway system
- Provincial highways in Nova Scotia; 100-series
← Trunk 12	→ Trunk 16

Trunk 14 is part of the Canadian province of Nova Scotia's system of Trunk Highways. The route runs from Chester to Milford Station through the Windsor area, for a distance of 121 kilometres (75 mi).

== Route description ==
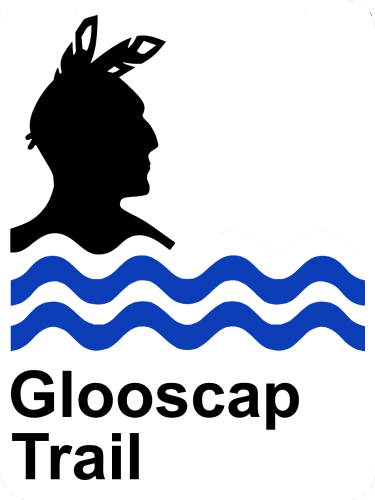
Part of the Glooscap Trail

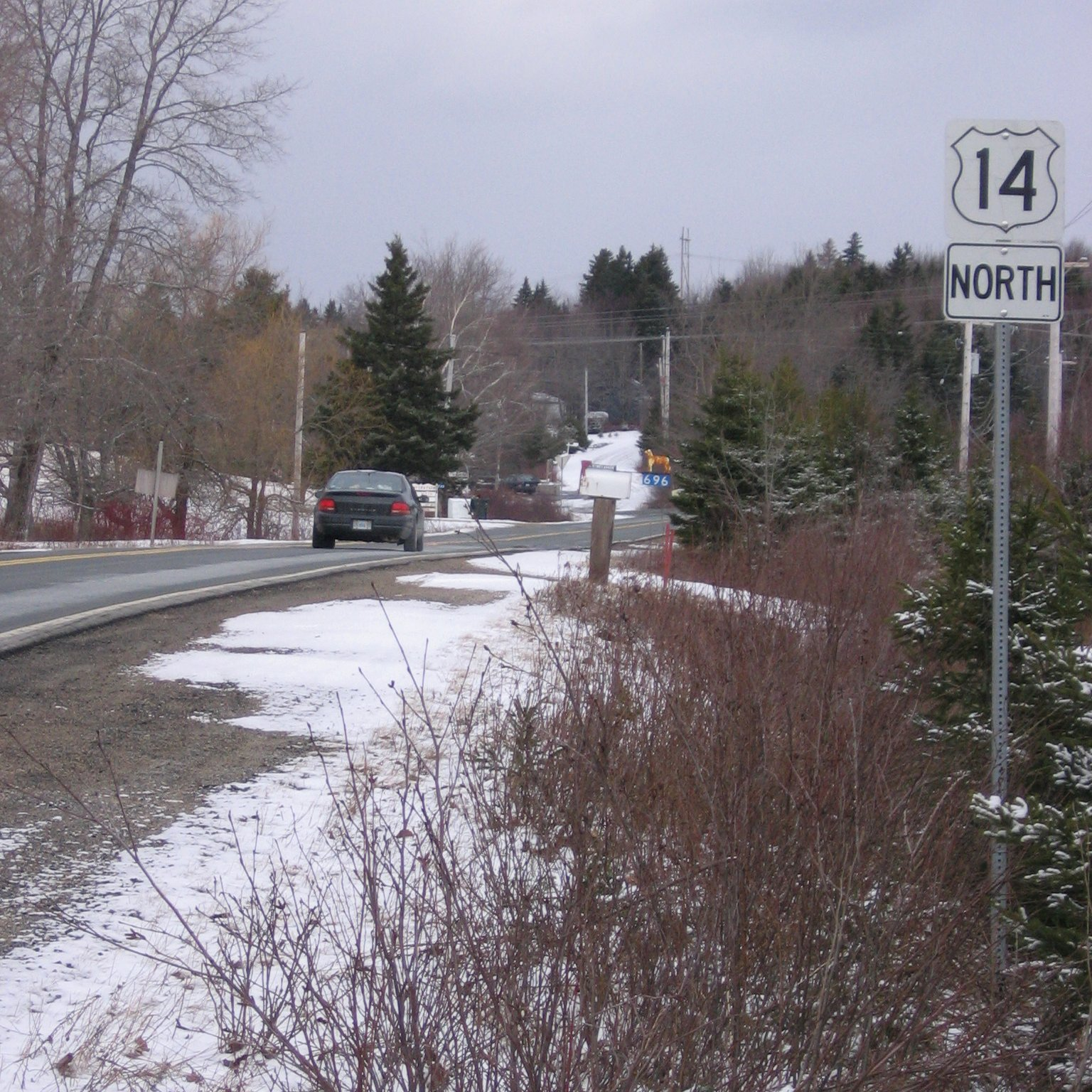
View of Route 14 outside Chester, Nova Scotia, where it is called Windsor Road.

From a junction with Trunk 3 and Highway 103 in Chester, Trunk 14 runs north along the Windsor Road to Sherwood beside Card Lake, then northeast through Vaughan and Martock to a junction with Trunk 1 at Currys Corner, in Windsor.

Trunk 14 follows Route 1 for a short distance to Garlands Crossing, where Trunk 14 branches off to the east. The route continues through the village of Brooklyn (running concurrently with Route 215 for a short distance) and then proceeds through the Rawdon region, turning southeast along the Nine Mile River to Lower Nine Mile River, where it turns eastward to its end at a junction with Trunk 2 and Highway 102 at Milford Station in the Musquodoboit Valley region.

== Major intersections ==
County	Location	km	mi	Destinations	Notes
Lunenburg	Chester	0.0	0.0	Trunk 3 (Lighthouse Route) – Chester, Hubbards, Bridgewater	Western terminus
Lunenburg	Chester	1.2	0.75	Hwy 103 – Bridgewater, Yarmouth, Halifax	Hwy 103 exit 8
Hants	Windsor	52.4	32.6	Trunk 1 west (Evangeline Trail) – Windsor, Mount Denson, Hantsport	West end of Trunk 1 concurrency
Hants	Garlands Crossing	54.2	33.7	Trunk 1 east (Evangeline Trail) – St. Croix	East end of Trunk 1 concurrency
Hants		55.2	34.3	Hwy 101 – Falmouth, Wolfville, Yarmouth, Dartmouth, Halifax	Hwy 101 exit 5
Hants	Brooklyn	64.0	39.8	Route 215 west – Halifax	West end of Route 215 concurrency; Route 215 heads southeast but signed west
Hants	Brooklyn	54.2	33.7	Route 215 east / Route 236 – Stanley, Walton	West end of Route 215 concurrency; Route 215 heads northwest but signed east
Hants	Centre Rawdon	80.8	50.2	Route 202 – Clarksville, Gore, South Rawdon, Lakelands	
Hants	Upper Rawdon	93.1	57.8	Route 354 – Kennetcook, Noel, Middle Sackville, Halifax	
Hants		98.2	61.0	Route 202 west to Route 354 – Gore, Kennetcook, Noel	
Hants	Lower Nine Mile River	110.3	68.5	Route 214 east – Elmsdale, Halifax	
Hants	Milford Station	119.9	74.5	Hwy 102 – Truro, Halifax; Route 224 north – Shubenacadie	Hwy 101 exit 5
Hants	Milford Station	120.7	75.0	Trunk 2 – Shubenacadie, Truro, Elmsdale, Halifax	Eastern terminus
1.000 mi = 1.609 km; 1.000 km = 0.621 mi: Concurrency terminus
