= Uniacke =

Uniacke may refer to:

== Given name ==
- Charles Uniacke Mader (1856–1929), merchant and political figure in Nova Scotia, Canada

== Surname ==
- Andrew Mitchell Uniacke (1808–1895), lawyer, banker, and politician in Nova Scotia
- Desmond Uniacke (1895–1933), British World War I flying ace
- James Uniacke (MP) (1736–1803), MP for Youghal (Parliament of Ireland constituency)
- James Boyle Uniacke (1799–1858), first Premier of the colony of Nova Scotia
- Luke Davies-Uniacke, Australian rules footballer with AFL club North Melbourne
- Norman Fitzgerald Uniacke (died 1846), lawyer, judge, and political figure in Lower Canada and Nova Scotia
- Richard G. F. Uniacke (1867–1934), British genealogist and librarian
- Richard John Uniacke (1753–1830), abolitionist, attorney general, member of Nova Scotia House of Assembly
- Robert Uniacke (1753–1802), MP for Youghal (Parliament of Ireland constituency)
- Robert Uniacke Fitzgerald (1751–1814), Irish politician
- Robert Fitzgerald Uniacke (1797–1870), clergyman in Halifax, Nova Scotia
- Robert Uniacke-Penrose-Fitzgerald (1839–1919), British Conservative politician
- Thomas Uniacke (died 1734), Irish politician, briefly sat as MP for Dungarvan (Parliament of Ireland constituency)

== Places ==
- East Uniacke, Nova Scotia, small community in Hants County, Nova Scotia, Canada
- Mount Uniacke, Nova Scotia, unincorporated community in Hants County, Nova Scotia, Canada
- South Uniacke, Nova Scotia, small community in Hants County, Nova Scotia, Canada
- Uniacke Square, public housing residential area in the north central area of Halifax, Nova Scotia
- Uniacke Estate Museum Park, centred on the home of Richard John Uniacke at Mount Uniacke
- Mount Uniacke, Co Cork, small community Co Cork, Ireland.

== See also ==
- Junibacken
- UNICE (disambiguation)
- Unac (disambiguation)
- Unik (disambiguation)
