= Nova Scotia Route 354 =

Highway in Nova Scotia, Canada

Route 354

Route information
- Maintained by Nova Scotia Department of Transportation and Infrastructure Renewal
- Length: 70 km (43 mi)

Major junctions
- South end: Hwy 101 in Middle Sackville
- Trunk 1 in Middle Sackville; Trunk 14 in Upper Rawdon; Route 202 in Gore; Route 236 in Kennetcook
- North end: Route 215 in Noel

Location
- Country: Canada
- Province: Nova Scotia

Highway system
- Provincial highways in Nova Scotia; 100-series
← Route 349	→ Route 357

Route 354 is a collector road in the Canadian province of Nova Scotia.

It is located in the central part of the province and connects Middle Sackville at Highway 101 with Noel at Route 215. From Middle Sackville to Beaver Bank it runs on the "Beaver Bank Road". Speed limits vary from 50km/h for a short section in Lower Sackville to 80km/h for the majority of the route past Beaver Bank.

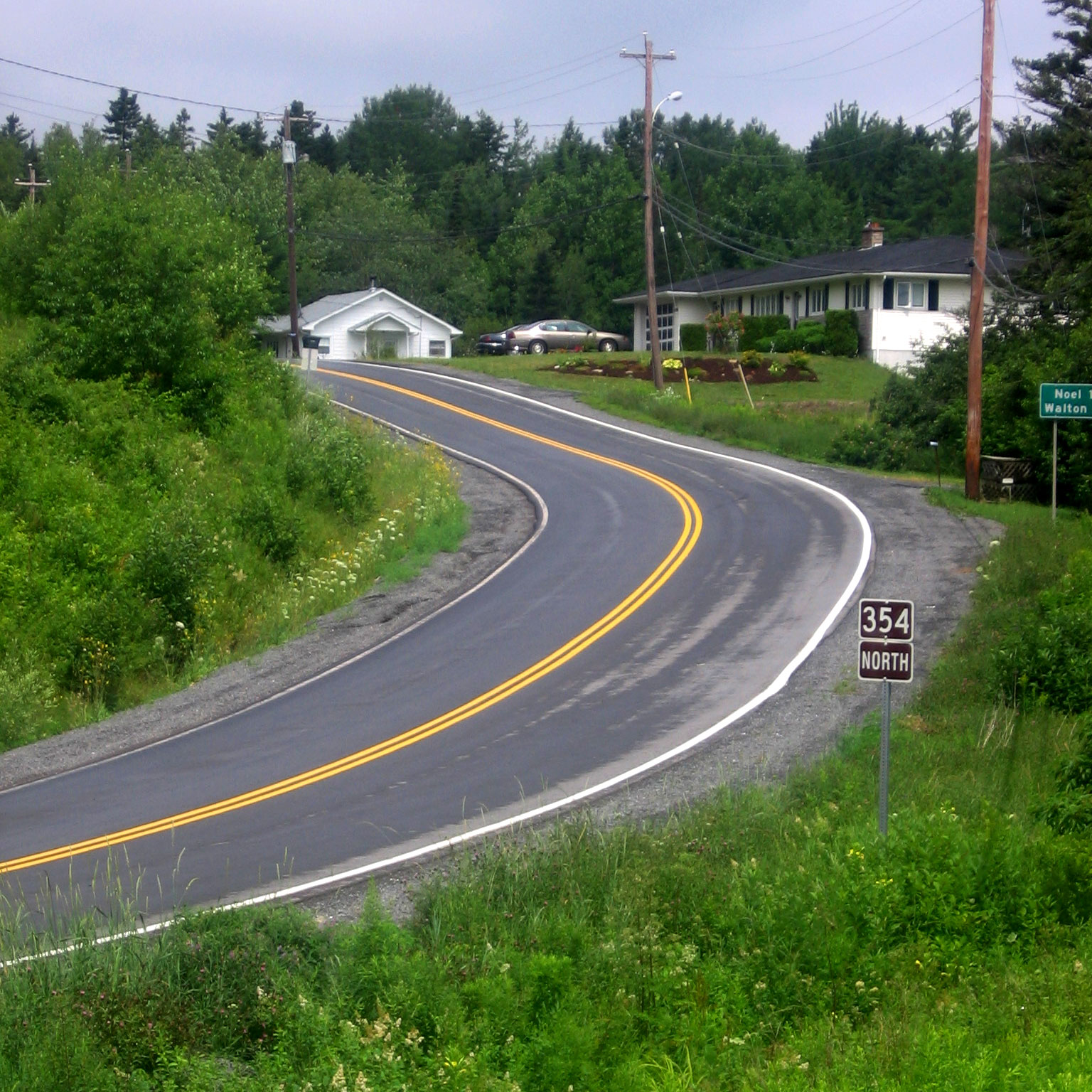
Section of Route 354 in Kennetcook, Nova Scotia

== Communities ==
- Middle Sackville
- Beaverbank
- Middle Beaverbank
- North Beaverbank
- Beaver Bank Villa
- Upper Rawdon
- Gore
- Kennetcook
- Noel Road
- North Noel Road
- Gormanville
- Noel

== See also ==
- List of Nova Scotia provincial highways
