= Hants =

Hants may refer to:

- Hampshire, a county in England, often abbreviated Hants
  - Mid Hants Watercress Railway, in Hampshire
- Hants County, Nova Scotia, a Canadian county named for the English one
  - East Hants, Nova Scotia, a municipal district
  - West Hants, Nova Scotia, a municipal district
  - Hantsport, Nova Scotia, the town and port
  - Electoral districts (ridings) in the county include:
    - Hants (electoral district)
    - Hants (provincial electoral district)
    - Hants East
    - Hants West
    - Kings—Hants
    - Halifax—East Hants
    - Colchester—Hants
- Hant's Harbour, Newfoundland and Labrador, a Canadian town
