= Nova Scotia Route 236 =

Highway in Nova Scotia, Canada

Route 236

Route information
- Maintained by Nova Scotia Department of Transportation and Infrastructure Renewal
- Length: 77 km (48 mi)

Major junctions
- West end: Route 215 in Brooklyn
- Route 354 in Kennetcook; Route 215 in South Maitland; Route 289 in Green Oaks
- East end: Hwy 102 in Truro

Location
- Country: Canada
- Province: Nova Scotia
- Counties: Hants, Colchester

Highway system
- Provincial highways in Nova Scotia; 100-series
← Route 224	→ Route 239

Route 236 is a collector road in the Canadian province of Nova Scotia.

It is located in Hants County and Colchester County, connecting Brooklyn at Route 215 with Truro at Highway 102/Trunk 2.

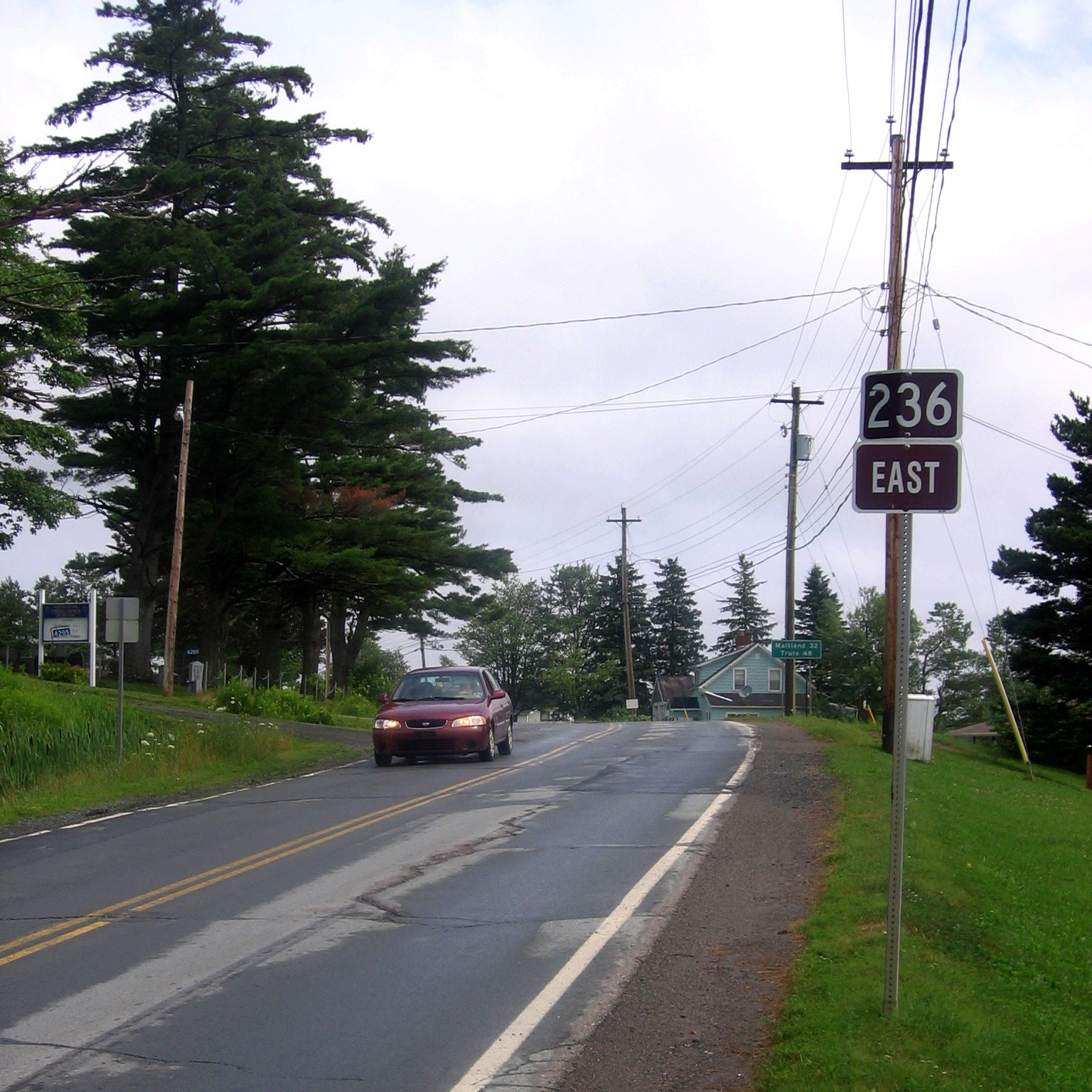
Section of Route 236 in Kennetcook

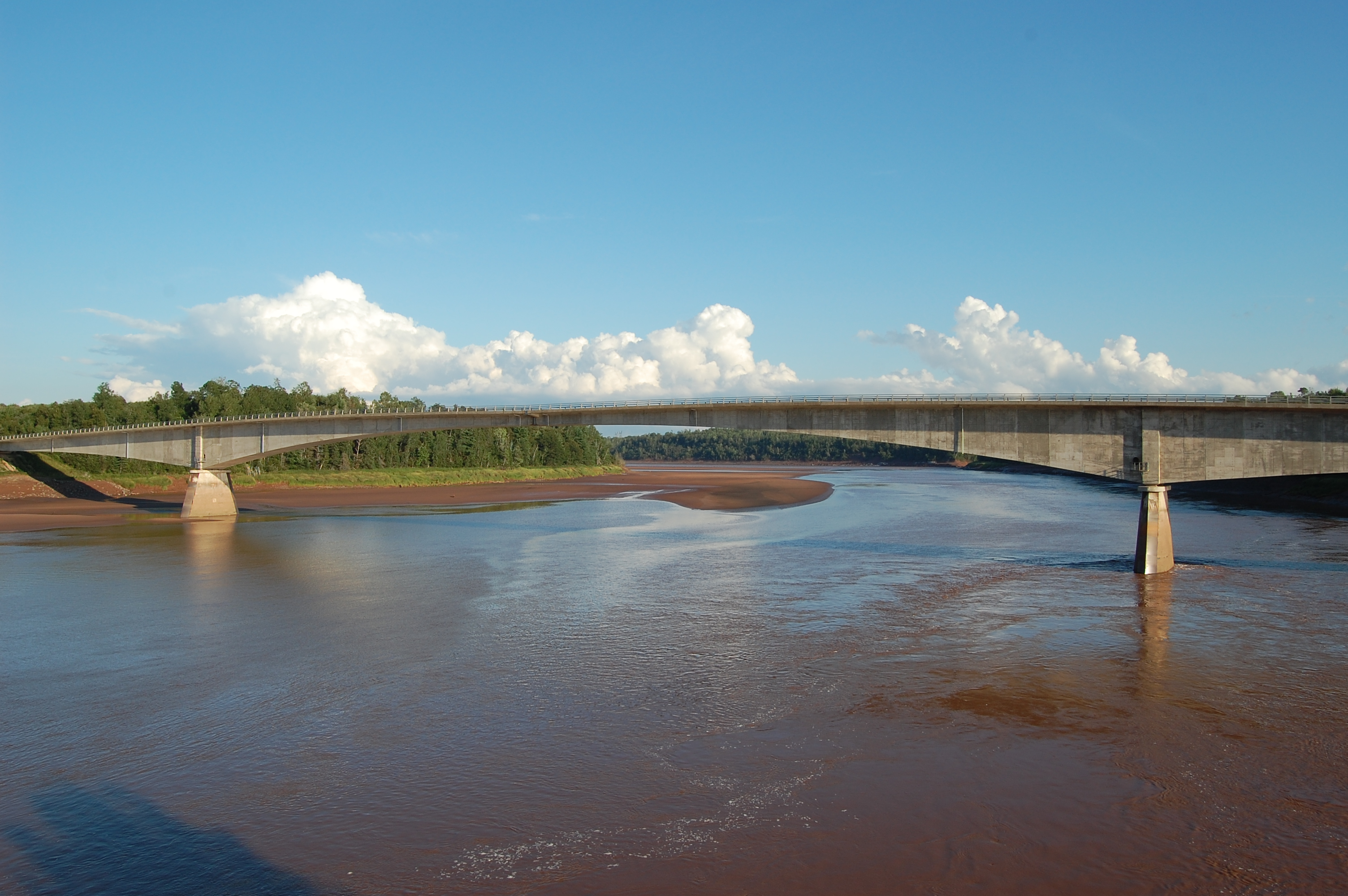
South Maitland Bridge over the Shubenacadie River

== Communities ==
- Brooklyn
- Union Corner
- Scotch Village
- Mosherville
- Stanley
- Clarksville
- Kennetcook
- South Maitland
- Green Oaks
- Beaver Brook
- Old Barns
- Lower Truro
- Truro

== See also ==
- List of Nova Scotia provincial highways
