= Nova Scotia Highway 102 =

Highway in Nova Scotia

Highway 102
- Veterans Memorial Highway (Fall River to Truro); Bicentennial Drive (exit 0 to exit 5)
- Highway 102 highlighted in red

Route information
- Maintained by Nova Scotia Department of Public Works
- Length: 101 km (63 mi)
- Existed: 1958–present

Major junctions
- South end: Bayers Road in Halifax
- Hwy 103 in Halifax; Hwy 101 / Trunk 1 in Bedford; Hwy 107 in Bedford; Hwy 118 / Trunk 2 at Fall River; Trunk 2 at Enfield; Trunk 14 at Milford; Trunk 2 in Truro; Trunk 2 / Trunk 4 in Onslow
- North end: Hwy 104 (TCH) in Onslow

Location
- Country: Canada
- Province: Nova Scotia
- Counties: Hants, Colchester, Halifax Regional Municipality, East Hants

Highway system
- Provincial highways in Nova Scotia; 100-series
← Hwy 101	→ Hwy 103

Highway 102 is a north–south 100-series highway in the Canadian province of Nova Scotia that runs from Halifax to Onslow, immediately north of the town of Truro.

In 2000, the section of Highway 102 between Fall River and Truro was redesignated as Veterans Memorial Highway. Between Fall River and Halifax it is known as Bicentennial Drive, Bicentennial Highway, or the shortened abbreviation Bi-Hi.

== Route description ==
The highway follows a 102-kilometre (63 mi) route through the central part of the province linking Highway 103, Highway 101, Highway 107, Highway 118, and Highway 104, the Trans-Canada Highway.

The entire highway is a divided four-lane freeway, with the exception of a five-lane (three lanes northbound) section between the Highway 118 interchange at Miller Lake and a point between exits 6 and 7 near the Halifax International Airport at Enfield. This three-lane northbound section is a relic of the previous configuration of this section of Highway 102. Previously, the section from Fall River to near Enfield was a three-lane undivided section, including a centre passing lane favouring northbound traffic. When the highway was twinned, the three lanes were left in place for northbound traffic. Portions of Highway 102 south of the Halifax International Airport pass through several microclimates and are notorious for frequent variations in visibility due to fog caused by elevation changes.

== History ==
=== Early development ===
The highway parallels the route of its predecessor, Trunk 2, and was developed in stages from 1958 to the 1970s. Initially, some sections were controlled access two-lane, as well as four-lane. The route has also changed somewhat, particularly during the mid-1970s when the last part to be constructed resulted in the bypass of Shubenacadie and Stewiacke.

The original portion of the highway from Dutch Village Road to Fall River was opened in October 1958, the bicentennial year of the First General Assembly of Nova Scotia (1758); as such, it is the oldest section of controlled access highway in Atlantic Canada. This portion of the highway was officially named Bicentennial Drive, but it has become known as the "Bicentennial Highway", often shortened to "Bi-Hi", even in official documents.

In the early 1960s, an overpass was constructed to extend the highway to Bayers Road in Halifax.

A new grade-separated interchange serving the Halifax International Airport opened in the 1972/73 fiscal year.

The Shubenacadie Bypass segment of Highway 102 started construction in 1974/75 and was opened to traffic in 1976/77. The C$17-million project, at the time the most expensive-ever undertaking by the former Department of Highways, stretches from Trunk 14 in Milford to Commo Road, and served to bypass the towns of Shubenacadie and Stewiacke. This highway section was built as a divided four-lane road, completing the divided highway from Waverley to Truro.

Work began to widen upgrade the highway to a four-lane divided facility between Bedford and the Prospect Road Connector (the Highway 103 interchange). Upon completion in 1979/80, this left the section of Highway 102 between Bedford and Waverley the only remaining undivided segment.

An interchange serving the Aerotech Business Park (exit 5A) opened in 1986/87. An interchange serving the new Bayers Lake Industrial Park opened in late December 1989.

=== 2000 and later ===
In 2000, the portion of Highway 102 between Miller Lake and Truro was redesignated as Veterans Memorial Highway.

New ramps connecting the highway to Dutch Village Road (now Joseph Howe Drive) in Halifax were opened on 24 November 2001. The ramps formerly exited onto Westerwald Street, and were rebuilt and realigned at a cost of $2 million.

A new interchange at Larry Uteck Boulevard (designated Exit 2B) was opened in October 2010 between Exits 2 (Kearney Lake Road) and 3 (Hammonds Plains Road). It was built at a cost of $24.4 million. It has since been connected on the west side of the interchange to Kearney Lake Road. This is the first major interchange to be built on Highway 102 since the mid-1990s and is intended to serve the rapidly growing community of Bedford South and the future area of Bedford West. The interchange is based on the traditional diamond layout but uses roundabouts instead of signalized intersections. As part of this project, Larry Uteck Boulevard was extended to the new interchange and now provides a direct connection between Highway 102 and Bedford Highway, serving new residential retail areas. In November 2014, Larry Uteck Boulevard was extended to connect to Kearney Lake Road from Highway 102. The existing portion of Kearney Lake Road between the new extension and Hammonds Plains Road also became part of Larry Uteck Boulevard, terminating Kearney Lake Road at the new intersection (civic 454).

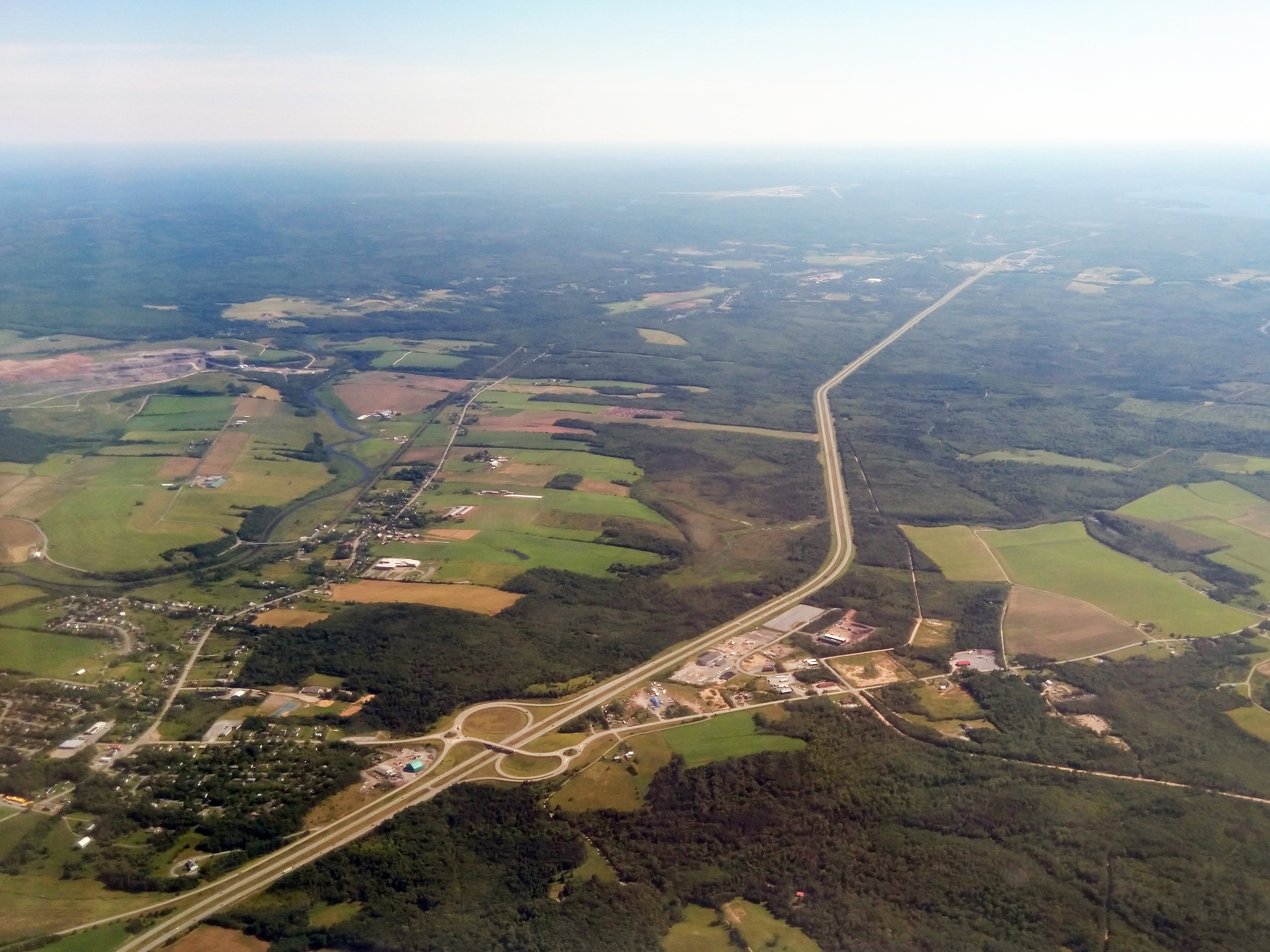
Highway 102 at exit 9, near Milford Station, Nova Scotia, showing the interchange rebuilt in 2010

In 2010, the Milford interchange (exit 9) was reconstructed.

An underpass beneath Highway 102 between Dunbrack Street and Lacewood Drive, built to link the Fairview neighbourhood with Bayers Lake Industrial Park, opened to traffic on 9 December 2011.

A new interchange at Lantz (Exit 8A), around two kilometres north of Exit 8, opened in December 2021. An access road was built to connect the interchange to Trunk 2 next to the East Hants Sportsplex. The project cost around C$28 million which was split between the federal and provincial governments. The bridges over Nine Mile River were replaced with wider, three-lane structures as part of this work.

=== Highway 103 interchange redevelopment ===
Between 2018 and 2020, the interchange between Highway 102 and Highway 103 underwent a $20-million upgrade that also involved modification of the nearby interchange at Dunbrack Street. The project included replacement of the Highway 103 overpass across Highway 102, minor northbound ramp realignments, major reconfiguration of southbound ramps, installation of new lighting, and installation of a tunnel beneath Highway 103.

Construction began with grubbing in early 2018, with construction of the new, four-lane overpass and tunnel commencing shortly thereafter. The new overpass and tunnel were constructed next to the old overpass to minimize traffic disruption. The interchange was closed between December 6–8, 2019 for demolition of the old overpass.

On March 19, 2020, the new tunnel beneath Highway 103 opened, marking the completion of the southbound ramp reconfiguration. Ramps on the northbound side of Highway 102 were only realigned slightly to align with the new overpass. Ramps on the southbound side of Highway 102 saw a larger reconfiguration. Exit 1D to Dunbrack street on Highway 102 was closed, replaced by access via Exit 1A and the new tunnel. Access to Highway 102 southbound from Highway 103 is provided by a realigned Exit 1B which passes over the tunnel. Access to Dunbrack Street from Highway 103 is now accessed directly by a new Exit 1D which merges with the exit road of the tunnel.

== Future development ==
Highway 102 near Halifax was the subject of a 2009 study called Highway 102 Corridor Study which examined the performance of the existing highway and projected which upgrades will be required in the future.

The proposed Highway 113 would create a new interchange between Larry Uteck Boulevard (Exit 2B) and Hammonds Plains Road (Exit 3). Highway 113 is intended to be a connector from Highway 102 to Highway 103, serving as a bypass to the heavily traveled Hammonds Plains Road (Route 213). Highway 113 is not yet budgeted and in addition some opposition has been mounted due to the route proposed, which would bisect the proposed Blue Mountain-Birch Cove Lakes Regional Park.

== Speed ==
The initial speed limit on the highway was 100 km/h (60 mph) until 1997, when it was raised to 110 km/h (70 mph) for the section between the interchange with Highway 118 (approximately km 26) and exit 13A at Millbrook (approximately km 92). South of Highway 118 and north of Millbrook, the highway retains its original 100 km/h speed limit.

From the 1970s to the early 1990s, Highway 102 was actively patrolled by the RCMP using aerial surveillance for speed limit violations. The aerial surveillance program was restarted in 2005.

== Exit list ==
From south to north:

County	Location	km	mi	Exit	Destinations	Notes
Halifax	Halifax	0.0	0.0		Bayers Road, Mailing Street	At grade; official Hwy 102 southern terminus
Halifax	Halifax	0.5	0.31	0	Joseph Howe Drive	Inbound exit; outbound entrance
Halifax	Halifax	1.9	1.2	1D	Dunbrack Street (Trunk 32)	No southbound exit; exits 1K/1H on Trunk 32; Trunk 32 is unsigned
Halifax	Halifax	2.7	1.7	1A	Hwy 103 west (Lighthouse Route) to Trunk 3 / Route 333 – Peggys Cove, Yarmouth, Dunbrack Street	
Halifax	Halifax	2.7	1.7	1A	Dunbrack Street (Trunk 32)	Southbound exit only
Halifax	Halifax	5.1	3.2	2A	Lacewood Drive — Bayers Lake	
Halifax	Halifax	8.1	5.0	2	Kearney Lake Road	
Halifax	Halifax	10.1	6.3	2B	Larry Uteck Boulevard	
Halifax	Bedford	13.1	8.1	3	Hammonds Plains Road (Route 213)	Northbound signed as exits 3A (east) and 3B (west)
Halifax	Lower Sackville; Bedford	17.0	10.6	4A	Trunk 1 east (Bedford Highway) to Trunk 2 / Trunk 7 – Dartmouth	Exits 1G/1H on Hwy 101; southbound exit via exit 4C
Halifax	Lower Sackville; Bedford	17.0	10.6	4B	Hwy 101 / Trunk 1 west (Evangeline Trail) – Lower Sackville, Windsor	Exits 1G/1H on Hwy 101; southbound exit via exit 4C
Halifax	Lower Sackville; Bedford	18.4	11.4	4C	Glendale Avenue / Duke Street	
Halifax	Lower Sackville; Bedford	18.4	11.4	4C	Hwy 107 east – Burnside, Dartmouth	Opened in December 2024
Halifax	Fall River	25.2	15.7	5	Trunk 2 / Route 318 – Waverley, Fall River, Wellington	Northbound access to Hwy 118
Halifax	Fall River	25.5	15.8	—	Hwy 118 south to Hwy 107 / Hwy 111 – Dartmouth, Halifax	Southbound exit, northbound entrance
Halifax		32.3	20.1	5A	To Trunk 2 (Aerotech Drive) / Route 212 – Wellington	
Halifax		35.6	22.1	6	Halifax Stanfield International Airport	
Halifax	Enfield	41.0	25.5	7	Trunk 2 – Enfield, Oakfield, Wellington	
Hants	Elmsdale	47.9	29.8	8	Route 214 – Lantz, Windsor	
Hants	Lantz	49.8	30.9	8A	To Trunk 2 – Lantz	Opened in 2022
Hants	Milford	58.2	36.2	9	Trunk 14 / Route 224 – Shubenacadie, Rawdon	
Hants	Shubenacadie	65.2	40.5	10	Route 215 – Noel Shore, Maitland	
Colchester	Stewiacke	71.1	44.2	11	To Trunk 2 – Alton	
Colchester	Brookfield	84.4	52.4	12	Route 289 to Trunk 2 – Hilden, Upper Stewiacke	
Colchester	Millbrook First Nation	93.6	58.2	13A	Treaty Trail / Tower Road	
Colchester	Truro	96.2	59.8	13	To Trunk 2 / Truro Heights Connector Road	
Colchester	Truro	98.2	61.0	14	Trunk 2 south (Glooscap Trail) / Route 236 west (Robie Street) – Bible Hill, Lower Truro	South end of Trunk 2 concurrency
Colchester	Onslow	99.6	61.9	14A	Trunk 2 north (Glooscap Trail) / Route 311 / Trunk 4 – Tatamagouche, Masstown	Northbound exit, southbound entrance; north end of Trunk 2 concurrency
Colchester	Onslow	100.8	62.6	15	Hwy 104 (TCH) – Amherst, New Brunswick, New Glasgow, Cape Breton	Signed as exits 15E (east) and 15W (west); exit 15 on Hwy 104
1.000 mi = 1.609 km; 1.000 km = 0.621 mi: Concurrency terminus; Incomplete access; Unopened
