= East Uniacke, Nova Scotia =

Community in Nova Scotia, Canada

East Uniacke
- Location in Nova Scotia
- Coordinates: 44°54′26″N 63°46′52″W
- Country: Canada
- Province: Nova Scotia
- County: Hants County
- Municipality: East Hants Municipality
- Time zone: UTC-4 (AST)
  - Summer (DST): UTC-3 (ADT)
- Canadian Postal Code: B0N
- Area code: 902
- Telephone Exchange: 883
- NTS Map: 011D13
- GNBC Code: CAKYM

East Uniacke is an unincorporated community in the Canadian province of Nova Scotia, located in East Hants Municipality in Hants County.

East Uniacke Road is the main route passing through the area, connecting Trunk 1 to the south (via Etter Rd.) to Route 354 (Beaver Bank Road) to the north.
