= White Settlement =

White Settlement may refer to one of the following places:

- White Settlement, Nova Scotia
- White Settlement, Texas

== See also ==
- European colonization of the Americas
