= West Indian Road =

Community in Nova Scotia, Canada

Coordinates: 45°6′53″N 63°34′33″W

West Indian Road is an unincorporated community in the Canadian province of Nova Scotia, located in East Hants Municipality in Hants County. Situated along an upper branch of the Nine Mile River, the community was likely named after a path created by the Mi'kmaq and later turned into a main road by English settlers. A school was erected at West Indian Road in 1865.
