= Hants Border, Nova Scotia =

Community in Nova Scotia, Canada

Coordinates: 45°4′24.89″N 64°11′21.46″W

Hants Border (2006 population: 352) is a community in the Canadian province of Nova Scotia, located in Kings County next to West Hants municipality and Hantsport on Nova Scotia Trunk 1.

== Demographics ==
In the 2021 Census of Population conducted by Statistics Canada, Hants Border had a population of 408 living in 167 of its 173 total private dwellings, a change of 3.8% from its 2016 population of 393. With a land area of 1.29 km^{2} (0.50 sq mi), it had a population density of 316.3/km^{2} (819.2/sq mi) in 2021.
