= Cogmagun, Nova Scotia =

Community in Nova Scotia, Canada

Cogmagun
- Location within Nova Scotia
- Coordinates: 45°5′39″N 64°3′30″W
- Country: Canada
- Province: Nova Scotia
- County: Hants County
- Municipality: East Hants Municipality
- Highest elevation: 0 m (0 ft)
- Lowest elevation: 60 m (200 ft)
- Time zone: UTC-4 (AST)
  - Summer (DST): UTC-3 (ADT)
- Canadian Postal Code: B0N 2A0
- Area code: 902
- NTS Map: 021H01
- GNBC Code: CAHLQ

Cogmagun (/ˈkɒɡməɡən/) is an unincorporated community in the Canadian province of Nova Scotia, located in West Hants Regional Municipality in Hants County. Its name is derived from the Mi'kmaq word "Kogumegunuk" or "Kookemagun", which is thought to have meant "the crooked river". Another variation of the name was "Coquemegonde". The name of the community was changed to Hillford in 1895, however the original name remained in popular use.

The land in the area was granted to the settlers of Newport township in 1761, and is thought to have been settled before 1800. St. Mark's Anglican church was erected in Cogmagun in 1850, but was not consecrated until May 31st, 1863. A post office was established in the community on July 1st, 1866, with C. Thomas as the postmaster.
