= Nova Scotia Trunk 12 =

Road in Nova Scotia, Canada

Trunk 12

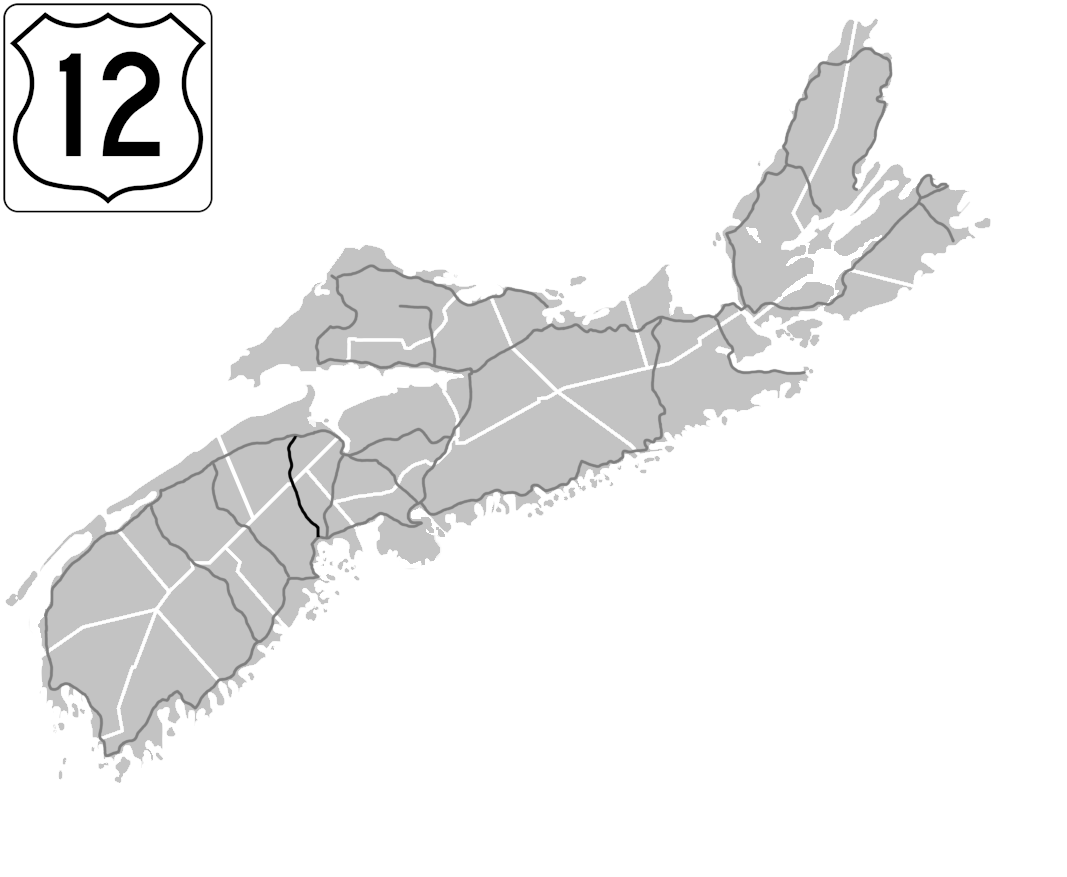

Route information
- Maintained by Department of Transportation and Infrastructure Renewal
- Length: 65.6 km (40.8 mi)

Major junctions
- South end: Trunk 3 in Chester Basin
- Hwy 103 near Chester Basin; Hwy 101 in North Alton
- North end: Trunk 1 in Kentville

Location
- Country: Canada
- Province: Nova Scotia
- Counties: Lunenburg, Kings
- Towns: Kentville

Highway system
- Provincial highways in Nova Scotia; 100-series
| ← Trunk 10 | → Trunk 14 |

Trunk 12 is part of the Canadian province of Nova Scotia's system of Trunk Highways. The route runs from Chester Basin to Kentville, a distance of 66 kilometres (41 mi).

== Route description ==
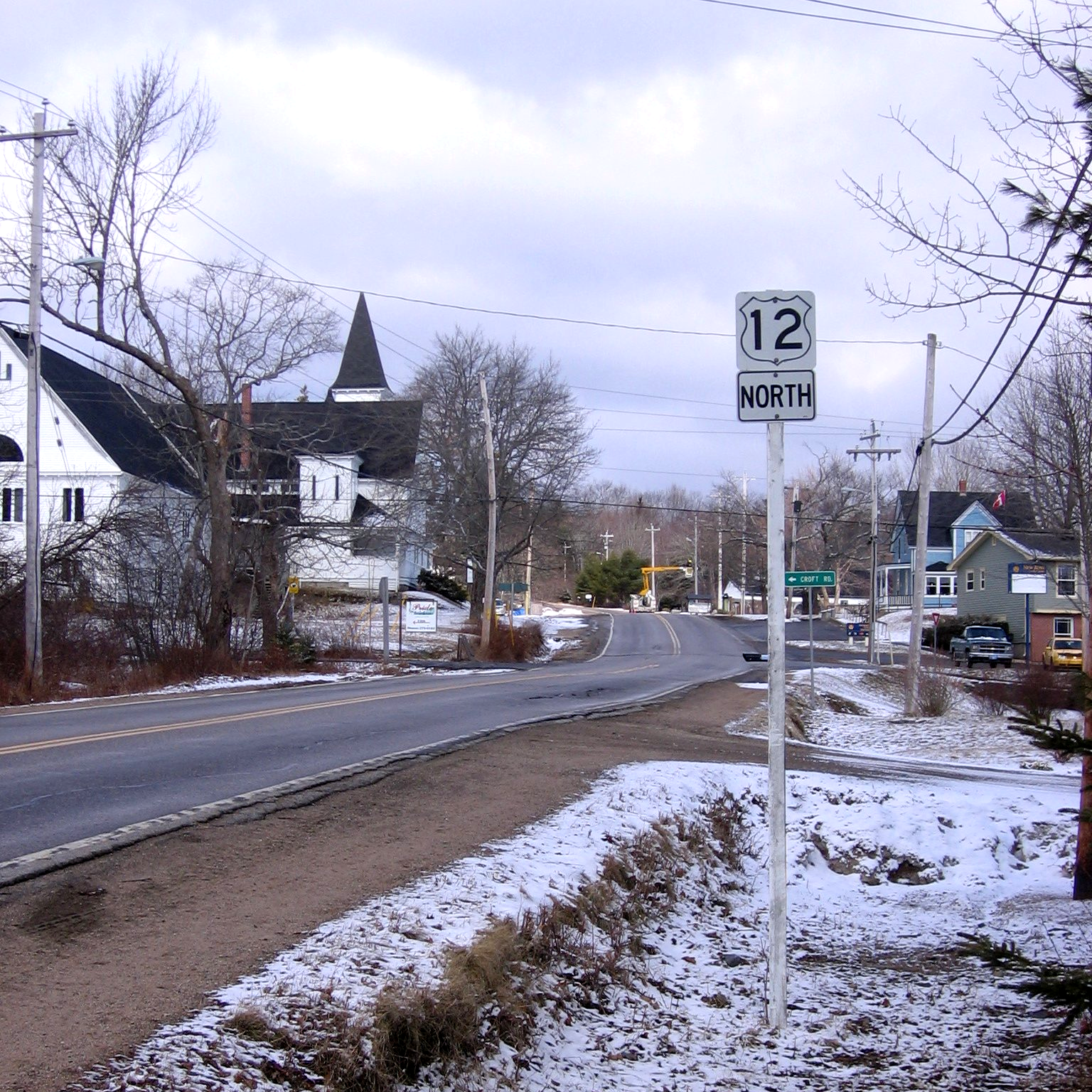
Route 12 in Chester Basin

The road's routing is through mostly uninhabited forest land, with a few small villages such as New Ross located on the route. For about 5 km, the road follows the eastern shore of Gaspereau Lake, the largest lake in Kings County, Nova Scotia.

== Communities ==
- Chester Basin
- Chester Grant
- Seffernsville
- New Ross
- Aldersville
- Blue Mountain
- South Alton
- Kentville

== Major intersections ==
| County | Location | km | mi | Destinations | Notes |
|---|---|---|---|---|---|
| Lunenburg | Chester Basin | 0.0 | 0.0 | Trunk 3 (Lighthouse Route) – Gold River, Western Shore, Bridgewater, Oak Island, Chester | Southern terminus |
| Lunenburg | Chester Basin | 1.2 | 0.75 | Hwy 103 – Mahone Bay, Bridgewater, Yarmouth, Hubbards, Halifax | Hwy 103 exit 9 |
| Lunenburg | New Ross | 24.1 | 15.0 | Forties Road / New Russell Road – Forties, Windsor | |
| Kings | North Alton | 61.9 | 38.5 | Hwy 101 – Berwick, Yarmouth, New Minas, Windsor, Halifax | Hwy 101 exit 13 |
| Kings | Kentville | 65.6 | 40.8 | Trunk 1 (Evangeline Trail / Main Street) – Coldbrook, New Minas, Wolfville | Northern terminus |
1.000 mi = 1.609 km; 1.000 km = 0.621 mi
