= Rufus Curry =

Canadian politician

Member of the Senate of Canada for Nova Scotia
- In office 12 March 1903 – 30 March 1905

Personal details
- Born: 31 August 1859 Avondale, Nova Scotia
- Died: 18 August 1934 (aged 74) Windsor, Nova Scotia
- Party: Liberal
- Profession: manufacturer, shipowner

Rufus Curry (31 August 1859 – 18 August 1934) was a manufacturer and painter in Nova Scotia. He was appointed to the Senate of Canada in 1903, but declined the appointment and never actually took his seat. Notwithstanding this, he is officially listed by the Parliament of Canada as having been a Liberal Party Senator from 1903 to 1905.

Curry was born in Avondale, Nova Scotia, the son of Frederick Curry, and joined his father's ship-owning and shipbuilding firm on reaching adulthood. He later inherited half of his father's estate, including all business and shipping interests. He moved to Windsor, Nova Scotia in the late 1890s, where he became a director of St. Croix Marine Insurance Company and a founder of the Electric Light Company of Windsor. He eventually served as Mayor of Windsor for one year.

He was appointed to the Senate on 12 March 1903, following nomination by Prime Minister Wilfrid Laurier to replace the recently deceased Clarence Primrose. A report in the Toronto Star newspaper indicates that he did not want the appointment, and declined to serve. However, no letter of resignation was received by the Governor General at that time.

He attempted to leave the Senate in March 1904 by submitting a letter of resignation to William S. Fielding, then the Minister of Finance in the House of Commons, although for some reason this was not accepted at the time. His resignation finally took effect on 30 March 1905, after the Committee on Orders and Customs of the Senate and Privileges of Parliament recommended that the Senate declare his seat vacant under the provisions of the British North America Act, 1867, which allows such an action after a Senator has missed two consecutive sessions.
