= Riverside Corner, Nova Scotia =

Community in Nova Scotia, Canada

Riverside Corner
- Location in Nova Scotia
- Coordinates: 45°7′58″N 63°47′16″W
- Country: Canada
- Province: Nova Scotia
- County: Hants County
- Municipality: East Hants Municipality
- Time zone: UTC-4 (AST)
  - Summer (DST): UTC-3 (ADT)
- Canadian Postal Code: B0N
- Area code: 902
- Telephone Exchange: 883
- NTS Map: 011E04
- GNBC Code: CBFVH

Riverside Corner is an unincorporated community in the Canadian province of Nova Scotia, located in East Hants Municipality in Hants County. Its name is descriptive, referring to a road junction situated beside the river.

One of the first settlers of the area was Hector McLean, who was working the land before being given a grant of 2000 acres on August 28, 1810. A schoolhouse was erected in Riverside Corner in 1872.
