= Belnan, Nova Scotia =

Community in Nova Scotia, Canada

Belnan
- Location in Nova Scotia
- Coordinates: 44°59′42″N 63°31′37″W
- Country: Canada
- Province: Nova Scotia
- County: Hants County
- Municipality: East Hants Municipality
- Time zone: UTC-4 (AST)
  - Summer (DST): UTC-3 (ADT)
- Canadian Postal Code: B2S
- Area code: 902
- Telephone Exchange: 259, 883
- NTS Map: 011D13
- GNBC Code: CACQR

Belnan is an unincorporated community in the Canadian province of Nova Scotia, located in East Hants Municipality in Hants County. Belnan is located between Elmsdale and Nine Mile River on Route 214, 42 kilometres northeast of Halifax.
