= Wellington Station, Nova Scotia =

Locality in Nova Scotia, Canada

Coordinates: 44°51′43.69″N 63°37′3.9″W

Wellington Station in Nova Scotia

Wellington Station is a locality in the Canadian province of Nova Scotia, located in the Halifax Regional Municipality.
