= Hillsvale, Nova Scotia =

Community in Nova Scotia, Canada

Hillsvale
- Location in Nova Scotia
- Coordinates: 44°57′4″N 63°52′53″W
- Country: Canada
- Province: Nova Scotia
- County: Hants County
- Municipalities: East Hants Municipality, West Hants Regional Municipality
- Time zone: UTC-4 (AST)
  - Summer (DST): UTC-3 (ADT)
- Canadian Postal Code: B0N
- Area code: 902
- Telephone Exchange: 883
- NTS Map: 011D13
- GNBC Code: CAQLY

Hillsvale is an unincorporated community in the Canadian province of Nova Scotia, located in both East Hants Municipality and West Hants Regional Municipality in Hants County.

Parts of present-day Hillsvale were a part of the Rawdon Township from the late 18th century to the mid 19th century.

Hillsvale was once the home of the McClare Brothers Lumber Mill (McClare Bros. Ltd), located in Hillsvale, West Hants. As of November 2021, you can still see what remains of the buildings and the sawdust piles behind them.
