= Hardwood Lands, Nova Scotia =

Community in Nova Scotia, Canada

Hardwood Lands
- Location in Nova Scotia
- Coordinates: 45°2′30″N 63°29′46″W
- Country: Canada
- Province: Nova Scotia
- County: Hants County
- Municipality: East Hants Municipality
- Time zone: UTC-4 (AST)
  - Summer (DST): UTC-3 (ADT)
- Canadian Postal Code: B0N
- Area code: 902
- Telephone Exchange: 883
- NTS Map: 011E04
- GNBC Code: CAPOM

Hardwood Lands is an unincorporated community in the Canadian province of Nova Scotia, located in East Hants Municipality in Hants County. The name of the community is descriptive, referring to its abundance of hardwood trees. The area was settled in 1816.

Hardwood Lands is home to a large sand pit, opened by Nova Scotia Sand & Gravel in 1954. Nova Scotia Sand & Gravel and the sand pit were purchased by Shaw Resources in 1966, and today supplies all sand for the runway of the Halifax Stanfield International Airport. The Hardwood Lands sand deposit is five kilometers in length and formed during the last ice age roughly 20,000 years ago.

In 1956, Hardwood Lands had a population of 173 people.
