= Maple Grove, Nova Scotia =

Community in Nova Scotia, Canada

Maple Grove
- Location in Nova Scotia
- Coordinates: 45°15′33″N 63°32′27″W
- Country: Canada
- Province: Nova Scotia
- County: Hants County
- Municipality: East Hants Municipality
- Time zone: UTC-4 (AST)
  - Summer (DST): UTC-3 (ADT)
- Canadian Postal Code: B0N
- Area code: 902
- Telephone Exchange: 883
- NTS Map: 011E05
- GNBC Code: CAXKN

Maple Grove is an unincorporated community in the Canadian province of Nova Scotia, located in East Hants Municipality in Hants County. The community was named for a prominent stand of maple trees in the area.

On February 8, 1813, Alexander Patterson received a land grant of 500 acres in Maple Grove along with James Dennison who received 250 acres. A school was built in Maple Grove in 1936.
