= Latties Brook, Nova Scotia =

Community in Nova Scotia, Canada

Latties Brook
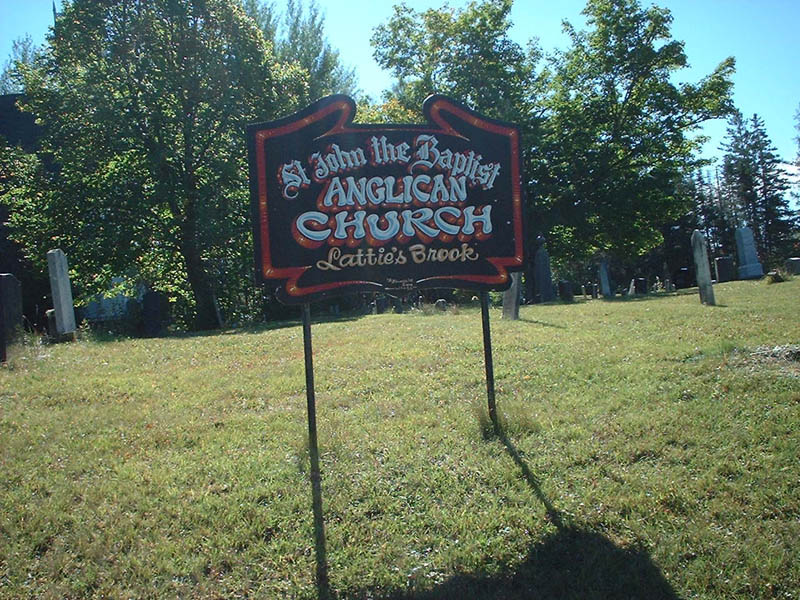
- Sign in front of St. John the Baptist Church in Latties Brook

- Location in Nova Scotia
- Coordinates: 45°14′12.78″N 63°34′15.03″W
- Country: Canada
- Province: Nova Scotia
- County: Hants County
- Municipality: East Hants

Latties Brook (formerly "Lattie's Brook") is an unincorporated community in the Canadian province of Nova Scotia, located in East Hants Municipality, Hants County. It shares the name with a river that runs through the community.

Latties Brook is thought to be named for early settlers in the area. James Mosher received a land grant of 500 acres in the area on April 6th, 1816. W. H. O. Haliburton was also provided a land grant of 300 acres in the area on July 13th, 1820.

Sometime prior to 1910, the Anglican church St. John the Baptist was constructed in Latties Brook.
