= Upper Kennetcook, Nova Scotia =

Community in Nova Scotia, Canada

Upper Kennetcook
- Location within Nova Scotia
- Coordinates: 45°12′6″N 63°39′27″W
- Country: Canada
- Province: Nova Scotia
- County: Hants County
- Municipality: East Hants Municipality
- Highest elevation: 110 m (360 ft)
- Lowest elevation: 30 m (98 ft)
- Time zone: UTC-4 (AST)
  - Summer (DST): UTC-3 (ADT)
- Canadian Postal Code: B0N 1T0
- Area code: 902
- Telephone Exchange: 883
- NTS Map: 011E04
- GNBC Code: CBMWS

Upper Kennetcook is an unincorporated community in the Canadian province of Nova Scotia, located in East Hants Municipality in Hants County.

== See also ==
- Kennetcook
