= Georgefield, Nova Scotia =

Community in Nova Scotia, Canada

Georgefield
- Location in Nova Scotia
- Coordinates: 45°12′15″N 63°33′22″W
- Country: Canada
- Province: Nova Scotia
- County: Hants County
- Municipality: East Hants Municipality
- Time zone: UTC-4 (AST)
  - Summer (DST): UTC-3 (ADT)
- Canadian Postal Code: B0N
- Area code: 902
- Telephone Exchange: 883
- NTS Map: 011E04
- GNBC Code: CANNI

Georgefield is an unincorporated community in the Canadian province of Nova Scotia, located in East Hants Municipality in Hants County. The locality of Burtons is located within Georgefield.

The community is named for George Miller, who was an early settler of the area in 1826. A schoolhouse was built in Georgefield in 1871.

The East Hants Waste Management Centre is located in Georgefield, and handles both garbage and recycled material for the Municipality of the District of East Hants.
