= Upper Burlington, Nova Scotia =

Community in Nova Scotia, Canada

Coordinates: 45°2′40.78″N 64°2′31.39″W

Upper Burlington in Nova Scotia

Upper Burlington is a community in the Canadian province of Nova Scotia, located in the West Hants Regional Municipality.

== See also ==
- Burlington, Nova Scotia
- Centre Burlington, Nova Scotia
- Lower Burlington, Nova Scotia
