= Burlington, Nova Scotia =

Community in Nova Scotia, Canada

Coordinates: 45°6′46.68″N 64°49′8.37″W

Burlington in Nova Scotia

Burlington is a community in the Canadian province of Nova Scotia, located in Kings County.

== See also ==
- Centre Burlington, Nova Scotia
- Lower Burlington, Nova Scotia
- Upper Burlington, Nova Scotia
