= Sweets Corner, Nova Scotia =

Community in Nova Scotia, Canada

Coordinates: 44°58′56.23″N 64°2′50.55″W

Sweet's Corner in Nova Scotia

Sweets Corner is an unincorporated community in the Canadian province of Nova Scotia, located in West Hants Regional Municipality.

The area was first settled by families named Dill, Cochran, Hunter and Sweet. One Sweet had a grocery store here at one time, about 1840. The place was named after him.

Construction of the New Westminster United Church in Sweets Corner began in 1936; the church was dedicated on 3 April 1938.
