= MacPhees Corner, Nova Scotia =

Community in Nova Scotia, Canada

MacPhees Corner
- Location in Nova Scotia
- Coordinates: 45°7′2″N 63°32′20″W
- Country: Canada
- Province: Nova Scotia
- County: Hants County
- Municipality: East Hants Municipality
- Time zone: UTC-4 (AST)
  - Summer (DST): UTC-3 (ADT)
- Canadian Postal Code: B0N
- Area code: 902
- Telephone Exchange: 883
- NTS Map: 011E04
- GNBC Code: CAXBM

MacPhees Corner (formerly McPhees Corner) is an unincorporated community in the Canadian province of Nova Scotia, located in East Hants Municipality in Hants County.

The community was named for the McPhee family, who were early settlers of the area. James, Evan, and Donald McPhee were given a 700 acre land grant in the area on February 6, 1822.

St. Thomas Anglican church was erected in the area in 1797. A new church building was later built in 1845 and consecrated in November 1892.
