= Stillwater, Hants, Nova Scotia =

Community in Nova Scotia, Canada

Coordinates: 44°57′35.78″N 63°52′45.55″W

Stillwater in Nova Scotia

Stillwater is a community in the Canadian province of Nova Scotia, located in West Hants Regional Municipality.

Stillwater was named after the Stillwater Brook which paralleled the railway for several hundred feet and crossed under the DAR mainline at the site of community. The arrival of the Nova Scotia Railway in 1858 (later to become the Windsor Branch of the DAR) opened up timber production in the forests and lakes around Stillwater. A number of sawmills with their own sidings surrounded the community which grew beside the tracks and included a large mill with its own siding and a school house. Stillwater was a regular station stop in the early years of the line and also included a coal shed and water tower for locomotives. Two spurs to other mills were located just east of Stillwater and another was located just west of Stillwater leading to Adams mill on Five Mile Lake just to the southeast of Stillwater.

However by the 1920s, most of the mills went out of operation and the community became a small seasonal logging and recreational fishing settlement served by a flag stop shelter and platform. Five Mile Lake was dammed in 1922 to provide a controlled water source for hydro power, which moved the coastline of the lake right beside the DAR line just east of Stillwater. This created a second nearby community of waterfront fishing cabins called Stillwater Lake.
