= North Alton, Nova Scotia =

Community in Nova Scotia, Canada

Coordinates: 45°3′4.1″N 64°30′55.1″W

North Alton in Nova Scotia

North Alton is a Canadian rural community in Kings County, Nova Scotia just outside Kentville.

The community is situated in the Annapolis Valley between South Alton and Kentville at the intersection of Trunk 12 and Highway 101.

In 2010 the annual Boston Christmas Tree came from North Alton.

A resident, Everett John Ward, made a fortune in the Klondike Gold Rush of 1898. A member of the North-West Mounted Police, he served in Dawson City for several years before striking it rich. Known thereafter as "Klondike Ward", he returned to Kentville in later life and made investments in the town.
