= Glenholme =

Community in Nova Scotia, Canada

Coordinates: 45°23′58″N 63°32′44″W

Glenholme in Nova Scotia

Glenholme is an unincorporated community in the Canadian province of Nova Scotia, located in Colchester County.
