= Lower Burlington, Nova Scotia =

Community in Nova Scotia, Canada

Coordinates: 45°5′16.16″N 64°8′36″W

Lower Burlington in Nova Scotia

Lower Burlington is a community in the Canadian province of Nova Scotia, located in the Municipality of West Hants.

== See also ==
- Burlington, Nova Scotia
- Centre Burlington, Nova Scotia
- Upper Burlington, Nova Scotia
