= Three Mile Plains, Nova Scotia =

Community in Nova Scotia, Canada

Three Mile Plains in Nova Scotia

Three Mile Plains is an unincorporated community in the Canadian province of Nova Scotia, located in West Hants Regional Municipality.

Three Mile Plains, along with Five Mile Plains, was originally inhabited by African-American settlers who called it Windsor Plains. The community was also once called Seven Mile Plains.

Three Mile Plains contains two churches, Windsor Plains Baptist Church and the Anglican Parish of Avon Valley. It also has an elementary school for grades primary-5 as well as a community hall. Major roads includes Panuke Road, Old Halifax Road, Three Mile Plains Crossroads, Mountain Road, Windsor Back Road, and Trunk 1.

== Education ==
=== Three Mile Plains District School ===
The current elementary school, Three Mile Plains District School, opened in 1963 with an initial enrollment of 300 students, which included children from Three Mile Plains and Five Mile Plains. The school was overcrowded and had to use the community centre to help accommodate the number of students. In the 1980s the school’s population started to decline because of a shrinking population in Three Mile Plains. In the 1990s the special education program closed, and the enrollment numbers fell again. In 2005, the school had an enrollment of 132 students; by 2007 it had risen to 160.

=== Five Mile Plains School ===
Five Mile Plains School was erected in 1945 and it became integrated in 1963. It was a one room school house for elementary students. Although this building isn’t used as an elementary school anymore it still stands and after the school closed it was briefly used as a community hall. Five Mile Plains had goals for students: “Respect Your Heritage, Respect Yourself, Respect Your Family”.
