= Urbania, Nova Scotia =

Community in Nova Scotia, Canada

Urbania
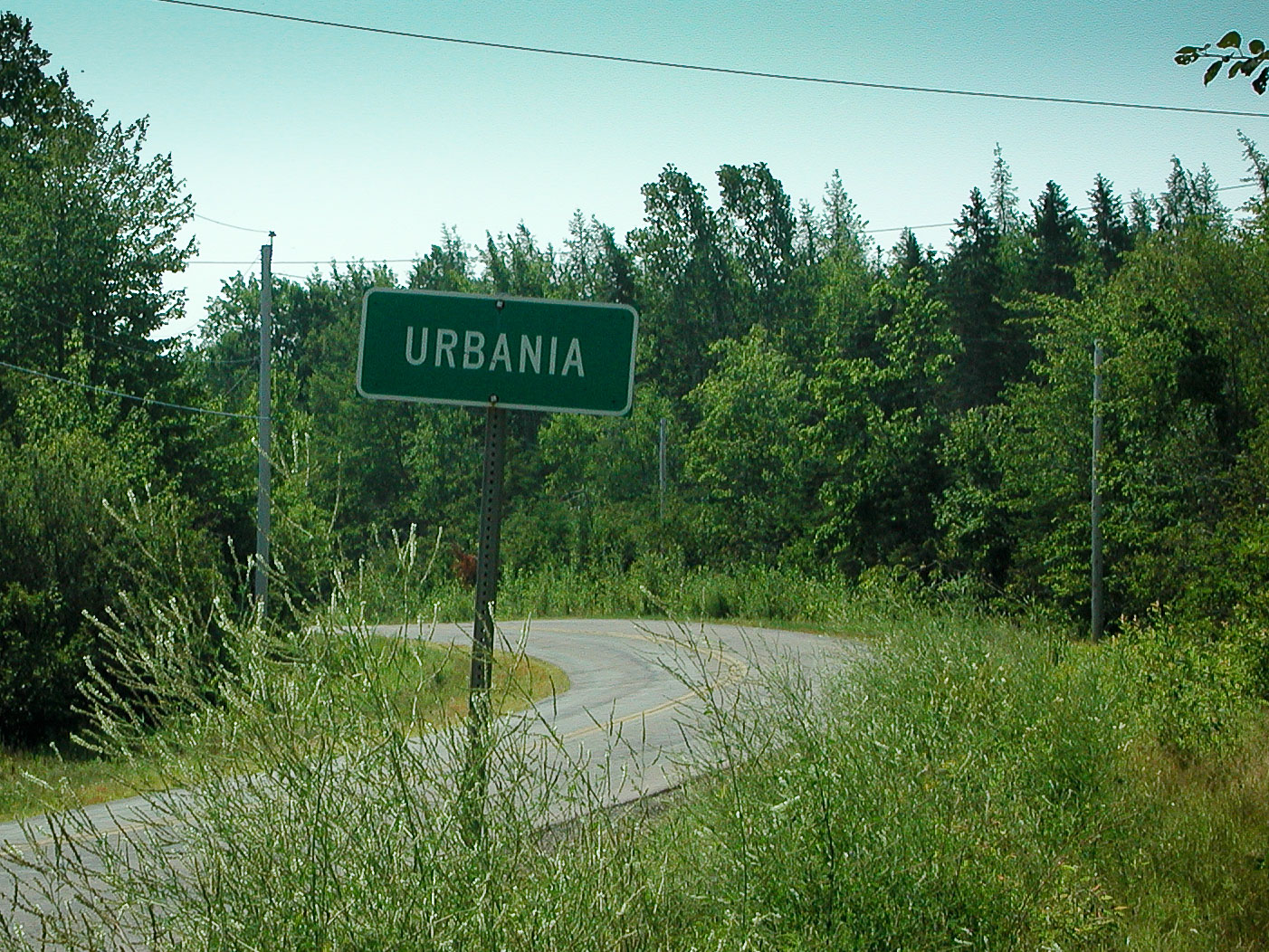
- Road sign in Urbania

- Location within Nova Scotia
- Coordinates: 45°12′53″N 63°25′33″W
- Country: Canada
- Province: Nova Scotia
- County: Hants County
- Municipality: East Hants Municipality
- Highest elevation: 120 m (390 ft)
- Lowest elevation: 0 m (0 ft)
- Time zone: UTC-4 (AST)
  - Summer (DST): UTC-3 (ADT)
- Canadian Postal Code: B0N 2H0
- Area code: 902
- Telephone Exchange: 883
- NTS Map: 011E03
- GNBC Code: CBNBF

Urbania is an unincorporated community in the Canadian province of Nova Scotia, located in East Hants Municipality in Hants County. Urbania was consistently the location of a post office serving the surrounding area from July 1 1870 until June 30 1966 when a new postal route was established in Shubenacadie. Present day Urbania consists mostly of farmland.

== History ==
Urbania was settled around 1822 and known as Carleton until 1860. The name "Urbania" is considered indicative of the hopes of the inhabitants when it was chosen as a name, deriving from urbis, Latin for "city".

In 1956, Urbania had a population of 87 people.
