= Gormanville, Nova Scotia =

Community in Nova Scotia, Canada

Gormanville
- Location in Nova Scotia
- Coordinates: 45°15′27″N 63°45′11″W
- Country: Canada
- Province: Nova Scotia
- County: Hants County
- Municipality: East Hants Municipality
- Time zone: UTC-4 (AST)
  - Summer (DST): UTC-3 (ADT)
- Canadian Postal Code: B0N
- Area code: 902
- Telephone Exchange: 883
- NTS Map: 011E05
- GNBC Code: CANZL

Gormanville is an unincorporated community in the Canadian province of Nova Scotia, located in East Hants Municipality in Hants County. The same families of Ultster Scots, the Densmores (arrived 1811) and O'Briens (arrived 1821), who had earlier settled Noel were the first to settle the area. The community was named much later after Matthew Gorman, who received a land grant in 1884. His two sons died young at age 22 and 27 and are buried in the Saint Francis Xavier Roman Catholic Cemetery, in Maitland.

Home of the Harvie 8, Avard, Edmund, Ernest, Victor, Ervin, Garnet, Burrell and Marven, sons of Richard and Sarah Harvie, are believed to be the most siblings from one family, from either North America or the British Commonwealth to serve and see action in World War II. Burrell and Marven made the ultimate sacrifice and did not return home.
