= Belmont, Hants, Nova Scotia =

Community in Nova Scotia, Canada

Belmont
- Location within Nova Scotia
- Coordinates: 45°2′42″N 64°4′36″W
- Country: Canada
- Province: Nova Scotia
- County: Hants County
- Municipality: West Hants Regional Municipality
- Time zone: UTC-4 (AST)
  - Summer (DST): UTC-3 (ADT)
- Canadian Postal Code: B0M
- Area code: 902
- NTS Map: 021H01
- GNBC Code: CACQN

Belmont (formerly Highfield) is an unincorporated community in the Canadian province of Nova Scotia, located in West Hants Regional Municipality.

The land encompassing Belmont was part of the Newport township, settled in 1761. Originally known as Highfield, the name was changed to Belmont in 1873. Belmont had a population of 106 people in 1956.
