= Tennycape, Nova Scotia =

Community in Nova Scotia, Canada

Tennycape
- Location in Nova Scotia
- Coordinates: 45°15′57″N 63°52′35″W
- Country: Canada
- Province: Nova Scotia
- County: Hants County
- Municipality: East Hants Municipality
- Time zone: UTC-4 (AST)
  - Summer (DST): UTC-3 (ADT)
- Canadian Postal Code: B0N
- Area code: 902
- Telephone Exchange: 883
- NTS Map: 011E05
- GNBC Code: CBLNQ

Tennycape (alternatively Tenecape) is a small community in the Canadian province of Nova Scotia, located in The Municipality of the District of East Hants in Hants County. The name of the community was erroneously printed as "Tenecape" on an official map in 1955, leading to long term confusion over the spelling of the name.

== Murder of the Little Peddler ==
On October 22, 1902, 16-year-old peddler Lion Lundore was bludgeoned to death for his watch by fellow peddler Syan Azabulley in Tennycape. This was the first documented murder in Hants County.

Both men were Assyrian peddlers passing through the village. Tennycape resident Edward Church was pursuing Syan Azabulley after he had swindled Church out of a revolver for a fake watch. Church heard the screams of the victim and upon arriving on the scene found Lion Lundore beaten with his throat cut. Azabulley then turned to chase Church, who escaped and later discovered the victim's body in an abandoned mine tunnel.

The men of the village tracked down Azabulley eating supper at the unsuspecting home of H.B. Huntley. A citizen's arrest was made by George Smith, a magistrate, along with Henry McLelland and Wilbert Lingard.

Azabulley was eventually taken to Windsor where he was sentenced to death for his crime and hanged on March 18, 1903, at 4:35am. Father Kennedy and Father Collins were both with the condemned man at the hanging.

Today, Syan Azabulley is buried in an unmarked grave in the Roman Catholic cemetery in Windsor. His victim, Lion Lundore, was buried in the Moose Brook cemetery and was known as the "Little Peddler".
