= Garlands Crossing, Nova Scotia =

Community in Nova Scotia, Canada

Coordinates: 44°58′28″N 64°6′35″W

Garlands Crossing in Nova Scotia

Garlands Crossing is a small community in the Canadian province of Nova Scotia, located in The Municipality of the District of West Hants in Hants County.
