= Minasville, Nova Scotia =

Community in Nova Scotia, Canada

Minasville
- Location in Nova Scotia
- Coordinates: 45°16′59″N 63°48′55″W
- Country: Canada
- Province: Nova Scotia
- County: Hants County
- Municipality: East Hants Municipality
- Time zone: UTC-4 (AST)
  - Summer (DST): UTC-3 (ADT)
- Canadian Postal Code: B0N
- Area code: 902
- Telephone Exchange: 883
- NTS Map: 011E05
- GNBC Code: CAZSU

Minasville is an unincorporated community in the Canadian province of Nova Scotia, located in East Hants Municipality in Hants County.

The area now including Minasville was part of a land grant given to Joseph Wilson in 1768. An additional land grant was given to William and Robert O'Brian in 1827. Minasville was created when the community of Moose Brook was divided in 1877, but did not receive its name until 1890.

Minasville was home to the "Mariner of Minasville" Captain William Scott (1846-1934). He served in the American Civil War and fought in the Seven Days Battle. A film about his life premiered at the Atlantic Film Festival.
