= Avondale, Hants, Nova Scotia =

Community in Nova Scotia, Canada

Avondale
- Location within Nova Scotia
- Coordinates: 45°01′23″N 64°07′25″W
- Country: Canada
- Province: Nova Scotia
- Municipality: West Hants
- Time zone: UTC-4 (AST)
  - Summer (DST): UTC-3 (ADT)
- Postal code: B0N 2A0
- Area code: 902
- GNBC Code: CABBW

Avondale is an unincorporated community in the Canadian province of Nova Scotia, located in the West Hants Regional Municipality. Located within Avondale is Newport Landing, location of the Avon River Heritage Society and Museum. Avondale is also home to the Avondale Sky Winery.
