= North Noel Road, Nova Scotia =

Community in Nova Scotia, Canada

North Noel Road
- Location in Nova Scotia
- Coordinates: 45°13′42″N 63°44′46″W
- Country: Canada
- Province: Nova Scotia
- County: Hants County
- Municipality: East Hants Municipality
- Elevation: 50–100 m (160–330 ft)
- Time zone: UTC-4 (AST)
  - Summer (DST): UTC-3 (ADT)
- Canadian Postal Code: B0N
- Area code: 902
- Telephone Exchange: 883
- NTS Map: 011E04
- GNBC Code: CBCAF

North Noel Road is a small community in the Canadian province of Nova Scotia, located in The Municipality of the District of East Hants in Hants County. The community is named after Noel Doiron.
