= South Uniacke, Nova Scotia =

Community in Nova Scotia, Canada

Coordinates: 44°50′28.55″N 63°46′22.4″W

South Uniacke in Nova Scotia

South Uniacke is a small community in the Canadian province of Nova Scotia, located in The Municipality of the District of East Hants in Hants County.

== See also ==
- Mount Uniacke, Nova Scotia
