= Ardoise =

Community in Nova Scotia, Canada

- Location within Nova Scotia
- Coordinates: 44°57′33″N 63°56′1″W
- Country: Canada
- Province: Nova Scotia
- Municipality: West Hants
- Highest elevation: 210 m (690 ft)
- Lowest elevation: 70 m (230 ft)
- Time zone: UTC-4 (AST)
  - Summer (DST): UTC-3 (ADT)
- Postal code: B0N 2A0
- Area code: 902
- NTS Map: 011D13
- GNBC Code: CAAVS

Ardoise (formerly Ardoise Hill) is a community in the Canadian province of Nova Scotia, located in West Hants Regional Municipality in Hants County. Its name is the French word for slate, and is considered descriptive of the geology of the area.

Reverend George Gillmore was given a land grant of 500 acres in Ardoise in 1786, but found the rocky landscape challenging to cultivate and moved away in 1791. A union meeting house was erected in Ardoise in 1830, and remained standing until at least 1967. A schoolhouse was erected in Ardoise before 1825, condemned in 1869, and a new schoolhouse erected in 1871.

Ardoise had a small gold mining industry from 1887 to 1904.
