= Bramber, Nova Scotia =

Community in Nova Scotia, Canada

Bramber
- Location within Nova Scotia
- Coordinates: 45°10′56″N 64°8′44″W
- Country: Canada
- Province: Nova Scotia
- Municipality: West Hants
- Highest elevation: 40 m (130 ft)
- Lowest elevation: 0 m (0 ft)
- Time zone: UTC-4 (AST)
  - Summer (DST): UTC-3 (ADT)
- Postal code: B0N 2A0
- Area code: 902
- GNBC Code: CBRJM

Bramber is a small community in the Canadian province of Nova Scotia, located in the Municipality of the District of West Hants in Hants County. It is possibly named after Bramber, Sussex, in England.
