= Unac =

Unac may refer to:

== People ==
- Sergio Uñac (born 1970), Argentine politician

== Places ==
- Unac (river), Bosnia and Herzegovina
- Unac, Ariège, commune in the Ariège department in southwestern France
- Unac, Plužine, Montenegro

== Other ==
- United Nations Association in Canada
