= Northfield, Hants, Nova Scotia =

Community in Nova Scotia, Canada

Northfield
- Location in Nova Scotia
- Coordinates: 45°15′13″N 63°40′35″W
- Country: Canada
- Province: Nova Scotia
- County: Hants County
- Municipality: East Hants Municipality
- Elevation: 45–100 m (148–328 ft)
- Time zone: UTC-4 (AST)
  - Summer (DST): UTC-3 (ADT)
- Canadian Postal Code: B0N
- Area code: 902
- Telephone Exchange: 883
- NTS Map: 011E05
- GNBC Code: CBBXV

Northfield is an unincorporated community in the Canadian province of Nova Scotia, located in East Hants Municipality in Hants County. The area is home to a Mennonite settlement.
