= Unik =

Unik may refer to:

- UNIK, Unik[Khanal] is a Nepalese people from Nepal.He is a Streamer
- Unik FK, a Swedish association football club
- Unik BK, a Swedish bandy club
