= Admiral Rock, Nova Scotia =

Community in Nova Scotia, Canada

Admiral Rock
- Location within Nova Scotia
- Coordinates: 45°10′13″N 63°24′30″W
- Country: Canada
- Province: Nova Scotia
- County: Hants County
- Municipality: East Hants Municipality
- Time zone: UTC-4 (AST)
  - Summer (DST): UTC-3 (ADT)
- Canadian Postal Code: B0N
- Area code: 902
- Telephone Exchange: 259, 883
- NTS Map: 011E03
- GNBC Code: CAAIZ

Admiral Rock is an unincorporated community in the Canadian province of Nova Scotia, located in East Hants Municipality in Hants County. It is presumed to be named for Admiral Alexander Cochrane, however it was also recorded in 1922 that the community was named for the presence of a rock with a "commanding appearance." Settlement of the area began in 1806.
