= Nova Scotia Route 214 =

Highway in Nova Scotia, Canada

Route 214

Route information
- Maintained by Nova Scotia Department of Transportation and Infrastructure Renewal
- Length: 10 km (6.2 mi)

Major junctions
- South end: Trunk 2 in Elmsdale
- Hwy 102 (Exit 8) in Elmsdale
- North end: Trunk 14 in Lower Nine Mile River

Location
- Country: Canada
- Province: Nova Scotia
- Counties: Hants

Highway system
- Provincial highways in Nova Scotia; 100-series
← Route 213	→ Route 215

Route 214 is a short north-south collector road in the south of the Canadian province of Nova Scotia, north of the Halifax. It travels across both forest and farmland and is paved for its entire route.

It is located in Hants County and connects Elmsdale at Trunk 2 with Lower Nine Mile River at Trunk 14.

== Route ==
Route 214 starts at Elmsdale on Highway 2. It begins by crossing Highway 102 at exit 8, almost one kilometer north of Trunk 2, where it then continues by going north-northwest for the rest of its route. The route then goes across Belnan, where it terminates on Trunk 14 at Upper Nine Mile River.

== Communities along Route 214 ==
- Elmsdale
- Belnan
- Upper Nine Mile River

=== Local roads served ===
- Garden Road
- Elmbel Road

== See also ==
- List of Nova Scotia provincial highways

== Sources ==
- MapArt (2008). Canada back road atlas / atlas des rangs et chemins. Oshawa, Ontario: MapArt Publishing. ISBN 978-1-55368-614-9.
