= Vaughan, Nova Scotia =

Community in Nova Scotia, Canada

Coordinates: 44°49′7.03″N 64°15′22.63″W

Vaughan in Nova Scotia

Vaughan is an unincorporated community in the Canadian province of Nova Scotia, located in West Hants Regional Municipality. The community includes the locality of Smiths Corner.
