= Moose Brook, Nova Scotia =

Community in Nova Scotia, Canada

Moose Brook
- Location in Nova Scotia
- Coordinates: 45°16′45″N 63°50′25″W
- Country: Canada
- Province: Nova Scotia
- County: Hants County
- Municipality: East Hants Municipality
- Elevation: 10–90 m (33–295 ft)
- Time zone: UTC-4 (AST)
  - Summer (DST): UTC-3 (ADT)
- Canadian Postal Code: B0N
- Area code: 902
- Telephone Exchange: 883
- NTS Map: 011E05
- GNBC Code: CBQXU

Moose Brook is an unincorporated community in the Canadian province of Nova Scotia, located in East Hants Municipality in Hants County. The name of the community is described in local folklore as originating from a story in which a wounded moose escapes two hunters by obscuring its trail in the brook.

The first of the land grants in the area was given to Joseph Northrup on April 13th, 1768. Northrup was later followed by Robert Faulkner, on May 19th, 1785; Samuel Brown, on August 10th, 1811; Colin Campbell, on December 15th, 1812; and Archibald and Janet Kerr, on February 23rd, 1815.

A post office was established in Moose Brook in May of 1863, under the direction of Thomas M. Reid. A Methodist church was erected in 1875, and was later purchased and converted to a Presbyterian church in 1887.

In 1877, the community of Moose Brook was divided into two communities, with the Eastern area taking the name of Minasville in 1890.
