= Cambridge, Hants County, Nova Scotia =

Community in Nova Scotia, Canada

Cambridge
- Location within Nova Scotia
- Coordinates: 45°12′3″N 64°5′34″W
- Country: Canada
- Province: Nova Scotia
- Municipality: West Hants
- Highest elevation: 120 m (390 ft)
- Lowest elevation: 0 m (0 ft)
- Time zone: UTC-4 (AST)
  - Summer (DST): UTC-3 (ADT)
- Postal code: B0N
- Area code: 902
- NTS Map: 021H01
- GNBC Code: CAFSY

Cambridge is an unincorporated community in the Canadian province of Nova Scotia, located in West Hants Regional Municipality in Hants County.
