= Pembroke, West Hants, Nova Scotia =

Community in Nova Scotia, Canada

Coordinates: 45°3′1.3″N 64°10′3.14″W

Pembroke in Nova Scotia

Pembroke is an unincorporated community in the Canadian province of Nova Scotia, located in West Hants Regional Municipality. The community is located west of Walton on Rainy Cove, part of the Minas Basin.

The Mi'kmaq word for Rainy Cove was "Kwanaskwe-gachech", meaning "driftwood." The area was once known as "Mutton Cove", and the name "Pembroke" likely refers to the 10th Earl of Pembroke.

A land grant of 3000 acres was given to Winckworth Tonge and his children on April 1, 1785. The area was primarily settled by Loyalists migrating from the Thirteen Colonies during the 1780s and 1790s.
