= Ellershouse, Nova Scotia =

Community in Nova Scotia, Canada

Coordinates: 44°56′49″N 64°0′13″W

Ellershouse in Nova Scotia

Ellershouse is a community in the Canadian province of Nova Scotia, located in West Hants Regional Municipality. The community is the birthplace of Medal of Bravery recipient Petty Officer 2nd Class John George Yurcak, M.B., C.D., Wall of Valour.
