= Chéverie, Nova Scotia =

Community in Nova Scotia, Canada

Coordinates: 45°9′25″N 64°10′30″W

Cheverie in Nova Scotia

Cheverie is a community in the Canadian province of Nova Scotia, located in the West Hants Regional Municipality in Hants County. The community has a history of gypsum mining.
