= Mosherville, Nova Scotia =

Community in Nova Scotia, Canada

Coordinates: 45°4′21″N 63°57′01″W

Mosherville in Nova Scotia

Mosherville is an unincorporated community in the Canadian province of Nova Scotia, located in West Hants Regional Municipality. The first recorded settlement in the area was founded by New England Planter James Mosher and his wife Lydia (Allan) Mosher (c. 1762), originally of Newport, Rhode Island.

Mosherville, Hants County is mentioned in Nova Scotia fiction writer Barry Wood's short story "Nowhere to Go" published in England's Postscripts #14 in 2008, and in Alden Nowlan's poem "The Mosherville Road".
