= Centre Burlington, Nova Scotia =

Community in Nova Scotia, Canada

Centre Burlington
- Location within Nova Scotia
- Coordinates: 45°4′2″N 64°6′14″W
- Country: Canada
- Province: Nova Scotia
- Municipality: West Hants
- Highest elevation: 30 m (98 ft)
- Lowest elevation: 0 m (0 ft)
- Time zone: UTC-4 (AST)
  - Summer (DST): UTC-3 (ADT)
- Postal code: B0N 2A0
- Area code: 902
- NTS Map: 021H01
- GNBC Code: CBRMN

Centre Burlington is an unincorporated community in the Canadian province of Nova Scotia, located in West Hants Regional Municipality in Hants County.

== See also ==
- Burlington, Nova Scotia
- Lower Burlington, Nova Scotia
- Upper Burlington, Nova Scotia
