= Middle Beaverbank, Nova Scotia =

Coordinates: 44°50′54.84″N 63°41′9.39″W

Middle Beaverbank in Nova Scotia

Middle Beaverbank is a rural community of the Halifax Regional Municipality in the Canadian province of Nova Scotia.
