= Windsor Forks, Nova Scotia =

Community in Nova Scotia, Canada

Coordinates: 44°56′22.09″N 64°11′22.7″W

Windsor Forks in Nova Scotia

Windsor Forks is an unincorporated community in the Canadian province of Nova Scotia, located in West Hants Regional Municipality.

== Education ==
Windsor Forks is home to the Windsor Forks District School which teaches grades primary to five.
