= Lower Truro =

Community in Nova Scotia, Canada

Coordinates: 45°21′43.33″N 63°21′40.48″W

Lower Truro in Nova Scotia

Lower Truro is a community in the Canadian province of Nova Scotia, located in Colchester County.

== See also ==
- Truro, Nova Scotia
