= Lakelands, Hants County, Nova Scotia =

Community in Nova Scotia, Canada

Coordinates: 44°55′19.3″N 63°52′53.58″W

Lakelands in Nova Scotia

Lakelands is a community in the Canadian province of Nova Scotia, located in the Municipal District of East Hants. This area between Windsor and Halifax was known to the Mi'kmaq as "Enskoomadedetic," meaning a place where conversation can be carried on at a long range, both being hidden. Thomas Nickleson Jeffery had a farm in the area by 1815.
