= Noel Road, Nova Scotia =

Community in Nova Scotia, Canada

Noel Road
- Location in Nova Scotia
- Coordinates: 45°12′16″N 63°44′15″W
- Country: Canada
- Province: Nova Scotia
- County: Hants County
- Municipality: East Hants Municipality
- Time zone: UTC-4 (AST)
  - Summer (DST): UTC-3 (ADT)
- Canadian Postal Code: B0N
- Area code: 902
- Telephone Exchange: 883
- NTS Map: 011E04
- GNBC Code: CBBPZ

Noel Road is an unincorporated community in the Canadian province of Nova Scotia, located in East Hants Municipality in Hants County. The community is named after Noel Doiron.

The community of Noel Road includes the locality of White Settlement.
