= Martock, Nova Scotia =

Community in Nova Scotia, Canada

Martock
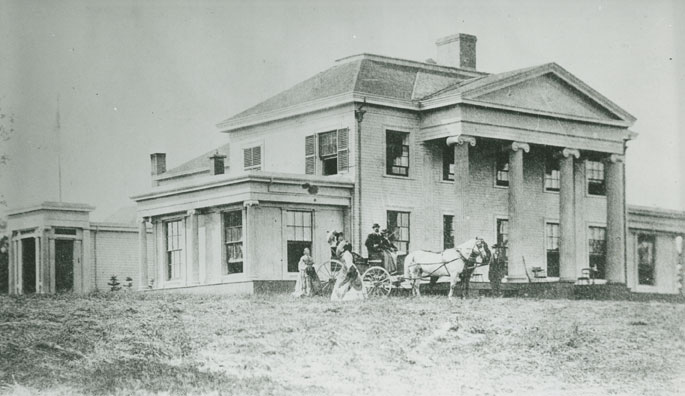
- Martock House

- Location within Nova Scotia
- Coordinates: 44°57′06″N 64°09′37″W
- Country: Canada
- Province: Nova Scotia
- Municipality: West Hants
- Named for: Martock, England
- Time zone: UTC-4 (AST)
  - Summer (DST): UTC-3 (ADT)
- Postal code: B0N 2T0
- Area code: 902
- GNBC Code: CAXSP

Martock is an unincorporated community in the Canadian province of Nova Scotia, located in the West Hants Regional Municipality.

The namesake of the community is Martock House, which was the original estate in the area. The Georgian style mansion was built in 1790 by Col. John Butler of England and originally boasted more than 4,000 acres (16 km^{2}) of land. Butler was given the estate and a number of slaves by George III and would name the estate for his birthplace of Martock, England. The home was owned by the Sweet family through much of the 19th and all of the 20th century.

The hills forming the Avon River valley in Martock host the Ski Martock ski resort.
