= Clarksville, Nova Scotia =

Community in Nova Scotia, Canada

Clarksville
- Location in Nova Scotia
- Coordinates: 45°6′2″N 63°49′54″W
- Country: Canada
- Province: Nova Scotia
- County: Hants County
- Municipality: East Hants Municipality
- Elevation: 20–50 m (66–164 ft)
- Time zone: UTC-4 (AST)
  - Summer (DST): UTC-3 (ADT)
- Canadian Postal Code: B0N
- Area code: 902
- Telephone Exchange: 883
- NTS Map: 011E04
- GNBC Code: CAHEX

Clarksville is an unincorporated community in the Canadian province of Nova Scotia, located in East Hants Municipality in Hants County.

Prior to the construction of the Midland Railway between Truro and Windsor, the area presently known as Clarksville was known as "Stanley". When the railway was completed, a station was constructed both at present-day Stanley and this community, and a new name was determined to be necessary. The community was named "Clarksville" after the Clark family, whose store had been a regular stopping place for railway officials during its construction.
