= South Alton, Nova Scotia =

Community in Nova Scotia, Canada

Coordinates: 45°1′16″N 64°32′16″W

South Alton in Nova Scotia

South Alton is a community in the Canadian province of Nova Scotia, located in Kings County.
