= Brooklyn, Hants County, Nova Scotia =

Community in Nova Scotia, Canada

Brooklyn
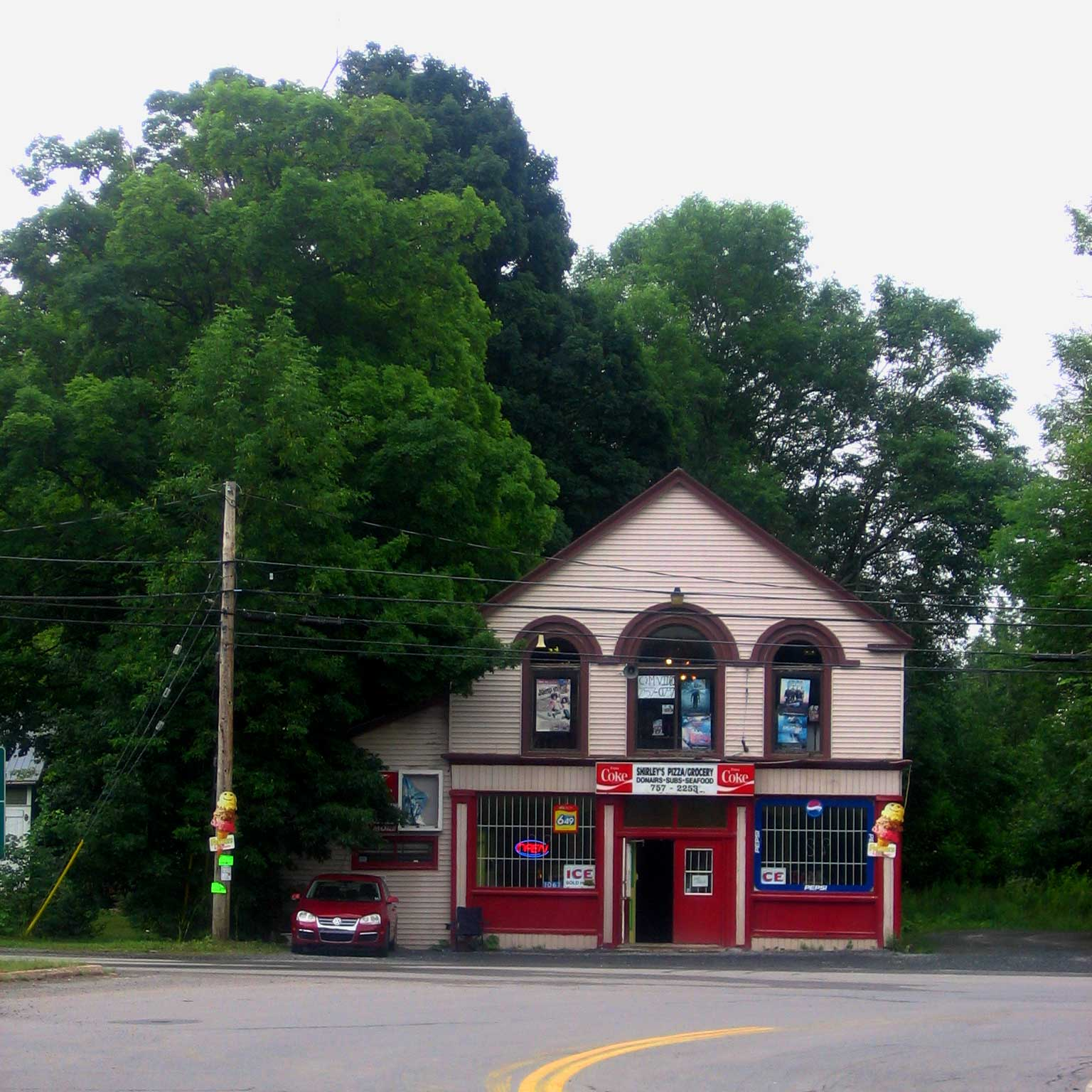

- Location within Nova Scotia
- Coordinates: 45°00′22″N 64°00′36″W
- Country: Canada
- Province: Nova Scotia
- Municipality: West Hants
- Time zone: UTC-4 (AST)
  - Summer (DST): UTC-3 (ADT)
- Postal code: B5A
- Area code: 902
- GNBC Code: CAFFI

Brooklyn is a rural community in the Canadian province of Nova Scotia, located in West Hants Regional Municipality. The area had a population of 916 people in 2016.

The Mi'kmaq referred to the area as Nelegakumik, meaning "broken snowshoes". Brooklyn is unusual in that its post office is officially called Newport.

== History ==
The township of Newport was established on 31 March 1761 'from the part of Falmouth east of the Pisiquid (now the Avon River) which was known as East Falmouth.' Named by Charles Morris, chief surveyor, he wrote: 'I have proposed to have it named Newport from my Lord Newport, a friend of Mr. Belcher's, and I believe that it will be agreeable to the people.' Jonathan Belcher, had served under Belcher and was in 1761 serving as Lt. Governor of Nova Scotia.

Two years later, Morris reported:'The inhabitants have imported large quantities of cattle and have this year cut hay sufficient for supporting them. The river Pisiquid running through [this township] is navigable for sloops to all the settlements. The town [Avondale] is situated in the centre.'

Many early settlers to the township under British rule were New England Planters from Newport, Rhode Island, which probably explains why Morris felt that residents might be agreeable to Lord Newport's name being attached to the new township. The initial grant was given to John Nutting (loyalist).

The former township of Newport incorporated all of modern-day Windsor, Nova Scotia and rural communities east of the Avon River. Although the township disappeared, many community names remained, including:

- Newport (now the community of Brooklyn)
- Newport Corner
- Newport Station

The centre of the community is located at the junction of Routes 14 and 215. Brooklyn saw increased development during the late 1800s after the Midland Railway built a line across Hants County between Windsor and Truro. Thus Brooklyn Station was created, although its post office would be called Newport (P.O.) and this was approved on 5 July 1951.

"Brooklyn Station", located 1 km north of Brooklyn on the banks of the Herbert River, became an important station on the Midland Railway when the line was completed in 1901 and the station became the site of a large sawmill and a feed mill, later becoming part of the Dominion Atlantic Railway system in 1905. The community name was shortened from Brooklyn Station to simply Brooklyn on 30 August 1966 while still maintaining its post office name of Newport. This was subsequently confirmed on 22 July 1993 and in the Nova Scotia Civic Address Review on 14 November 2005. For the purposes of clarification, the provincial government's Geographic Names Board confirmed Newport as a post office within the community of Brooklyn on 10 November 2005.

Railway service was declining through Newport during the 1960s and the line would be subsequently abandoned by the Dominion Atlantic Railway in 1986.

The economy of the Brooklyn area has historically been dominated by agriculture, logging, sawmilling, and gypsum mining, but in recent years it is becoming a bedroom community for Halifax.

West Hants Middle School (formerly Hants West Rural High School) is located in Newport.
