= West Hants Regional Municipality =

West Hants
- Regional municipality
- West Hants Regional Municipality; Municipality of the District of West Hants (1879-2020); Region of Windsor and West Hants Municipality (2020)
- Motto: Something Inspiring Awaits
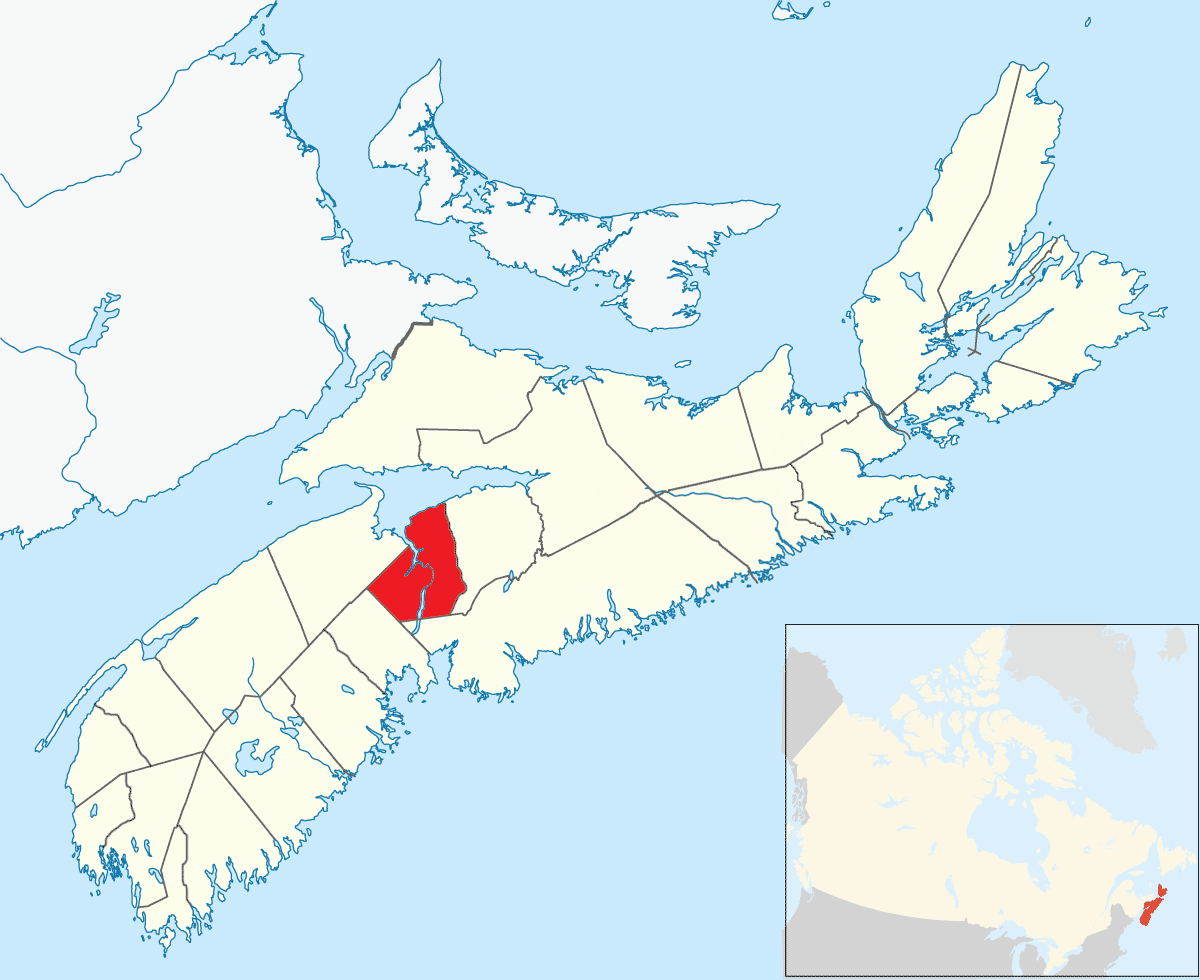
- Location of West Hants Regional Municipality
- Coordinates: 44°58′N 64°06′W
- Country: Canada
- Province: Nova Scotia
- County: Hants
- Incorporated: April 17, 1879
- Amalgamated: April 1, 2020
- Name change: October 6, 2020
- Electoral Districts Federal: Kings—Hants
- Provincial: Hants West

Government
  - Type: West Hants Municipal Council
  - Municipal Seat: Windsor
  - Mayor: Abraham Zebian

Area
  - Land: 1,244.09 km^{2} (480.35 sq mi)

Population (2016)
  - Total: 15,368
  - Density: 12.4/km^{2} (32/sq mi)
  - Change 2011-16: ▲0.3%
  - Census ranking: 275 of 4,870
- Time zone: UTC−04:00 (AST)
  - Summer (DST): UTC−03:00 (ADT)
- Area code: 902
- Dwellings: 6,101
- Median Income*: $46,036 CAD
- Website: Official website
- Median household income, 2005 (all households)

West Hants, officially named the West Hants Regional Municipality, is a regional municipality in Hants County, Nova Scotia, Canada.

It occupies the western half of Hants County, running from the Minas Basin to the boundary with Halifax County, sharing this boundary with the Municipality of the District of East Hants.

The Municipality of the District of West Hants amalgamated with Windsor on April 1, 2020, becoming the Region of Windsor and West Hants Municipality. It was renamed as West Hants Regional Municipality on October 6, 2020.

== Demographics ==
In the 2021 Census of Population conducted by Statistics Canada, the West Hants Regional Municipality had a population of 19,509 living in 8,374 of its 9,136 total private dwellings, a change of 2.6% from its 2016 population of 19,016. With a land area of 1,250.5 km^{2} (482.8 sq mi), it had a population density of 15.6/km^{2} (40.4/sq mi) in 2021.

Population trend
| Census | Population | Change (%) |
|---|---|---|
| 2016 | 15,368 | ▲0.3% |
| 2011 | 14,165 | ▲2.1% |
| 2006 | 13,881 | ▲0.7% |
| 2001 | 13,780 | ▼0.1% |
| 1996 | 13,792 | ▼1.3% |
| 1991 | 13,611 | N/A |

Mother tongue language (2006)
| Language | Population | Pct (%) |
|---|---|---|
| English only | 13,520 | 97.51% |
| Other languages | 225 | 1.62% |
| French only | 105 | 0.76% |
| Both English and French | 15 | 0.11% |

== Famous people ==
The poet George Elliot Clarke is from West Hants. His poem, "West Hants County" tells of the difficult condition of black workers in the gypsum mines at one time in its history.

== See also ==
- List of municipalities in Nova Scotia
