= Municipality of the District of East Hants =

Municipality in Nova Scotia, Canada

East Hants
- District municipality
- Municipality of the District of East Hants
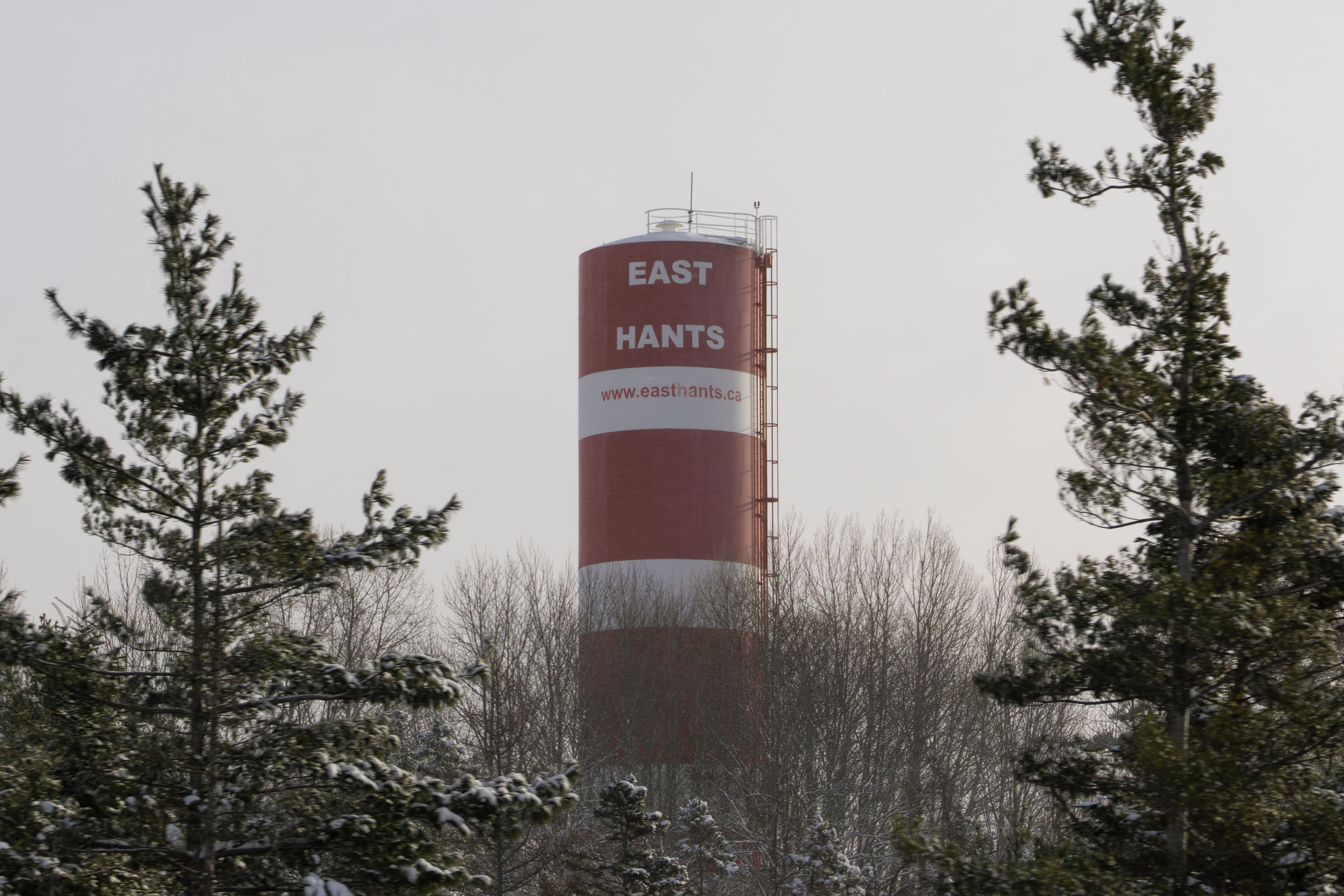

- Flag Seal
- Motto: Home of The World's Highest Recorded Tides
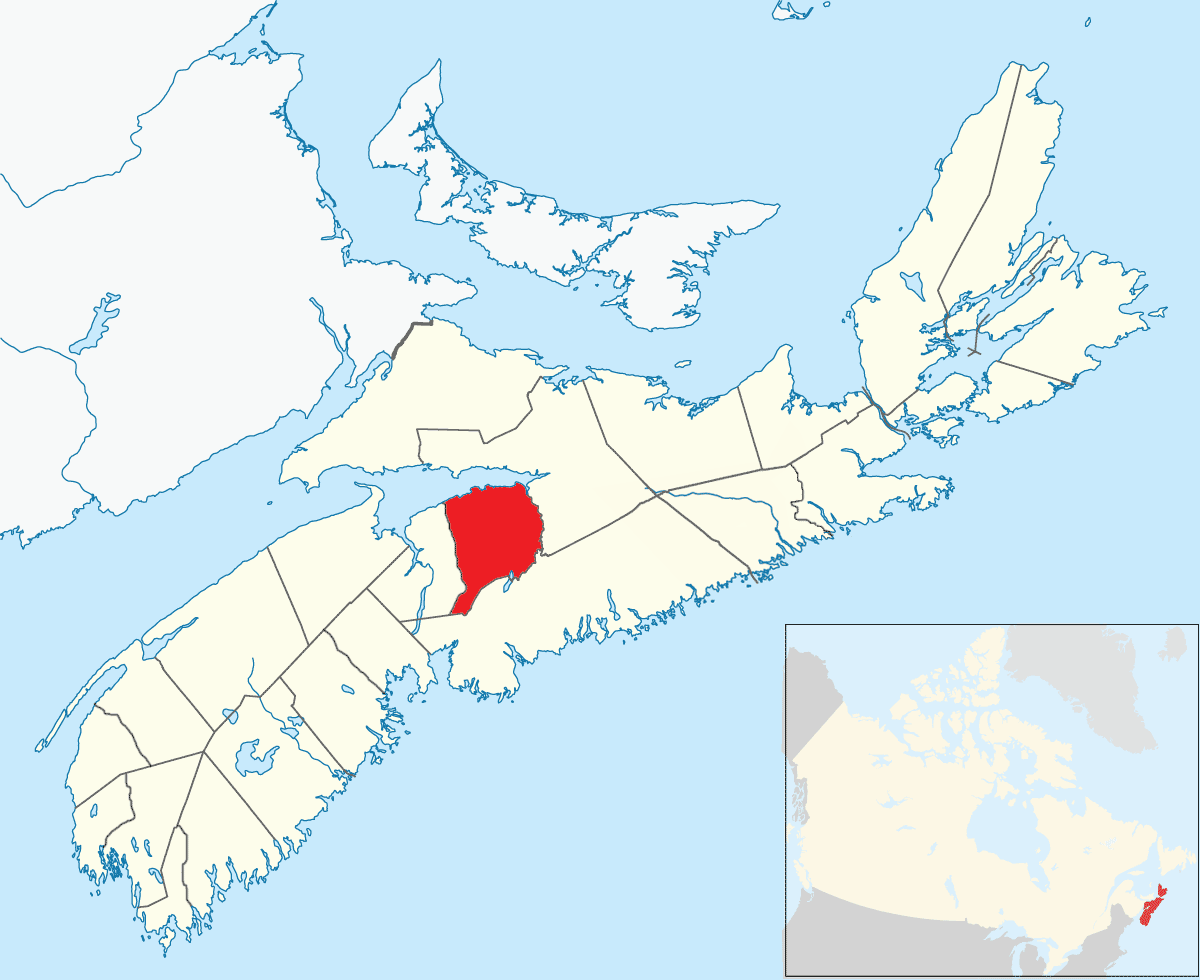
- Location of District of the Municipality of East Hants
- Coordinates: 45.05°N 63.75°W
- Country: Canada
- Province: Nova Scotia
- County: Hants
- Incorporated: April 14, 1879
- Electoral Districts Federal: Kings—Hants
- Provincial: Hants East

Government
  - Type: East Hants Municipal Council
  - Municipal Seat: Elmsdale
  - Warden: Eleanor Roulston

Area
  - Land: 1,786.56 km^{2} (689.79 sq mi)

Population (2021)
  - Total: 22,892
  - Density: 12.813/km^{2} (33.187/sq mi)
  - Change 2016-21: ▲2%
  - Census ranking: 197 of 4,831
- Time zone: UTC-4 (AST)
  - Summer (DST): UTC-3 (ADT)
- Area code: 902
- Dwellings: 8,753
- Median Income*: $56,591 CDN
- Website: Official website
- Median household income, 2005 (all households)

East Hants, officially named the Municipality of the District of East Hants, is a district municipality in Hants County, Nova Scotia, Canada. Statistics Canada classifies the district municipality as a municipal district.

With its administrative seat in Elmsdale, the district municipality occupies the eastern half of Hants County from the Minas Basin to the boundary with Halifax County, sharing this boundary with the West Hants Regional Municipality. It was made in 1861 from the former townships of Uniacke, Rawdon, Douglas, Walton, Shubenacadie and Maitland. Its most settled area is in the Shubenacadie Valley.

== History ==
The Municipality of East Hants was established in 1861 via the division of Hants County into two districts.

== Demographics ==
In the 2021 Census of Population conducted by Statistics Canada, the Municipality of the District of East Hants had a population of 22,892 living in 9,387 of its 10,046 total private dwellings, a change of 2% from its 2016 population of 22,453. With a land area of 1,786.53 km^{2} (689.78 sq mi), it had a population density of 12.8/km^{2} (33.2/sq mi) in 2021.

Population trend
Census	Population	Change (%)
2016	22,453	▲1.5%
2011	22,111	N/A (redefined boundaries)
2006	23,387	▲2.7%
2001	20,821	▲5.3%
1996	19,767	▲6.5%
1991	18,560	N/A

Mother tongue language (2006)
Language	Population	Pct (%)
English only	20,515	96.02%
Other languages	515	2.41%
French only	310	1.45%
Both English and French	25	0.12%

== Public works ==
The Public Works division operates two water utility distribution sites and three sewage collection and treatment systems for communities in the serviced areas adjacent to Highway 102 and along the Shubenacadie River. The division also operates an engineered spring which draws additional water from Grand Lake to the Shubenacadie River during low water level events.

Drinking water is distributed across 71.0 kilometers of main distribution lines. Wastewater is distributed through 80.5 kilometers of wastewater collection mains.

The Environmental Services division works closely with Public Works. This division monitors and reviews data to ensure compliance of operating approvals. Environmental Services also runs a watershed protection program that focuses on building awareness of watershed issues that impact watersheds of interest to the municipality.

== Notable people ==
- Hip hop artist Buck 65 is from Mount Uniacke, East Hants. Born Richard Terfry, he is also a radio host on CBC Radio.
- Luke Boyd, international recording artist better known as Classified, was born in Enfield, East Hants.

== Education ==
- Riverside Educational Centre middle school is located in Milford Station
- Elmsdale District School is located in Elmsdale
- Kennetcook District Elementary is located in Kennetcook
- Uniacke District School is located in Mount Uniacke
- Hants East Rural High School is located in Milford Station
- Hants North Rural High School is located in Kennetcook
- Cobequid District School is located in Noel
- Rawdon District School is located in Rawdon
- Shubenacadie District Elementary is an elementary schooled located in Shubenacadie

Chignecto-Central Regional Centre for Education is the school district for East Hants.

== See also ==
- East Hants Aquatic Centre
- List of municipalities in Nova Scotia
