= New Minas =

- Village
- Aerial view (2026)

- Flag
- Motto: "A Good Place To Live" "Shopping Centre of the Valley"
- Location of New Minas Nova Scotia
- Coordinates: 45°04′07″N 64°28′08″W
- Country: Canada
- Province: Nova Scotia
- County: Kings County
- Incorporated: September 1, 1968
- Electoral Districts Federal: Kings-Hants
- Provincial: Kings South

Government
  - Type: Village Commission
  - Chair: Dave Chaulk
  - MLA: Keith Irving Nova Scotia Liberal Party
  - MP: Kody Blois (L)

Population (2021)
  - Total: 4,662
- Time zone: UTC-4 (AST)
  - Summer (DST): UTC-3 (ADT)
- Postal code(s): B4N
- Website: newminas.com

New Minas is a Canadian village located in the eastern part of Kings County in Nova Scotia's Annapolis Valley. As of 2021, the population was 4,662.

== Geography ==
New Minas borders the town of Kentville to the west and the unincorporated community of Greenwich to the east. The town of Wolfville is further east on the other side of Greenwich. New Minas is approximately 100 km northwest of Halifax. The village is located along the south bank of the Cornwallis River occupying the lower slopes of the South Mountain. Nova Scotia's Highway No. 1 runs through the village forming the main street.

== History ==
New Minas was founded in 1682 by Acadians from the Grand Pré area, the largest of the settlements known as Les Mines or Minas after the French copper mines explored at Cape d'Or at the entrance to the Minas Basin in the 1600s. As the Minas settlement grew, families moved westward up the Cornwallis River led by Pierre Terriot and founded a new settlement which came to be known to English surveyors as "New Minas". The Acadians knew their settlement as St. Antoine. It was built beside a tidal island in the bend of the river, later known as Oak Island. They repeated the pattern of the Grand Pré settlement by connecting dykes to Oak Island to turn tidal marshland into productive farmland. The settlement grew to include a mill, chapel and burial ground at Oak Island. However the Acadians were expelled and the settlement was destroyed during the Bay of Fundy Campaign of the Acadian Expulsion in 1755. New England Planters resettled the area in 1760s as part of Horton Township but built their farms further from the river along the Old Post Road, later Nova Scotia's Highway No. 1.

New Minas was the site of one of the first accounts of a UFO sighting in North America on October 12, 1796. The diary of a merchant in Liverpool, Nova Scotia named Simeon Perkins reported that stories were circulating of ships flying in the air which "were said to be seen at one Mr. Ratchfords in New Minas" by a young woman and two men who at sunrise saw as many as fifteen "ships in the air ... and a man forward with his hand stretched out." Perkins continued, "the story did not obtain universal credit but some people believed it."

New Minas remained a predominantly farming and agricultural community between the towns of Kentville and Wolfville. The Dominion Atlantic Railway operated a gravel quarry at Oak Island in New Minas and served a growing number of food and bulk feed plants at New Minas in the mid 19th Century. However development increased with the construction of the Highway 101 expressway in the 1970s. With the village's low tax rate and the location between the population centres of Kentville and Wolfville, New Minas soon saw a shopping centre and numerous big box retail outlets and fast food shops established to make the village the retail centre for the eastern Annapolis Valley.

== Recent history ==
The village has been a major shopping mall destination since the early 1970s. In more recent decades, New Minas has been witness to a commercial boom which has seen many large retail outlets set up shop, while pre-existing retailers and many others have rebuilt into larger venues. One of the woes of the village is its heavy concentration of minimum-wage, service industry jobs. Other similarly sized communities nearby have a much wider range of income opportunities: Wolfville is an area supported by higher-education jobs with Acadia University, and Kentville is an area which supports itself with an industrial park, hospital, and an orientation toward professional centers. Due to New Minas having no hospital of its own, citizens must travel to Kentville by way of public transit or by use of their own vehicles to go to the hospital.

In recent years, New Minas has been lampooned by many of its citizens and tourists as having notoriously poor side roads. However, in the last 2–3 years, the Village of New Minas has been working on coercing the Province of Nova Scotia to focus on repairing these roads.

New Minas played host to the film crew of the popular television show Call Me Fitz. Where the filming took place used to be the old home of the local Kia Motors, but the local branch had moved to the other end of the town, so the showroom was converted into Fitzpatrick Motors.

Recently, a rotary was installed in the middle of New Minas to accommodate the increasing number of businesses and the new highway off-ramp from the nearby Highway 101 which has since finished construction as of 2018.
