= New Yarmouth =

Abandoned community in Canada

Coordinates: 45°22′31.5″N 64°49′46.5″W

New Yarmouth in Nova Scotia

New Yarmouth is an abandoned farming and forestry community which is now part of the Cape Chignecto Provincial Park in Cumberland County, Nova Scotia near the village of Advocate.

== Geography ==
New Yarmouth occupies a plateau 244 metres (800 feet) above West Advocate overlooking Advocate Bay, a branch of the Bay of Fundy. The highest point in Cape Chignecto Provincial Park is located on a summit of 275 metres (900 feet) just north of the New Yarmouth fire tower. McGahey Brook and Mill Brook have their source at New Yarmouth, draining south to Advocate Bay through deep ravines, while Copp Hollow Brook also begins at New Yarmouth, draining to the north. An abandoned log pond and several beaver ponds are found near the source of these brooks.

== History ==
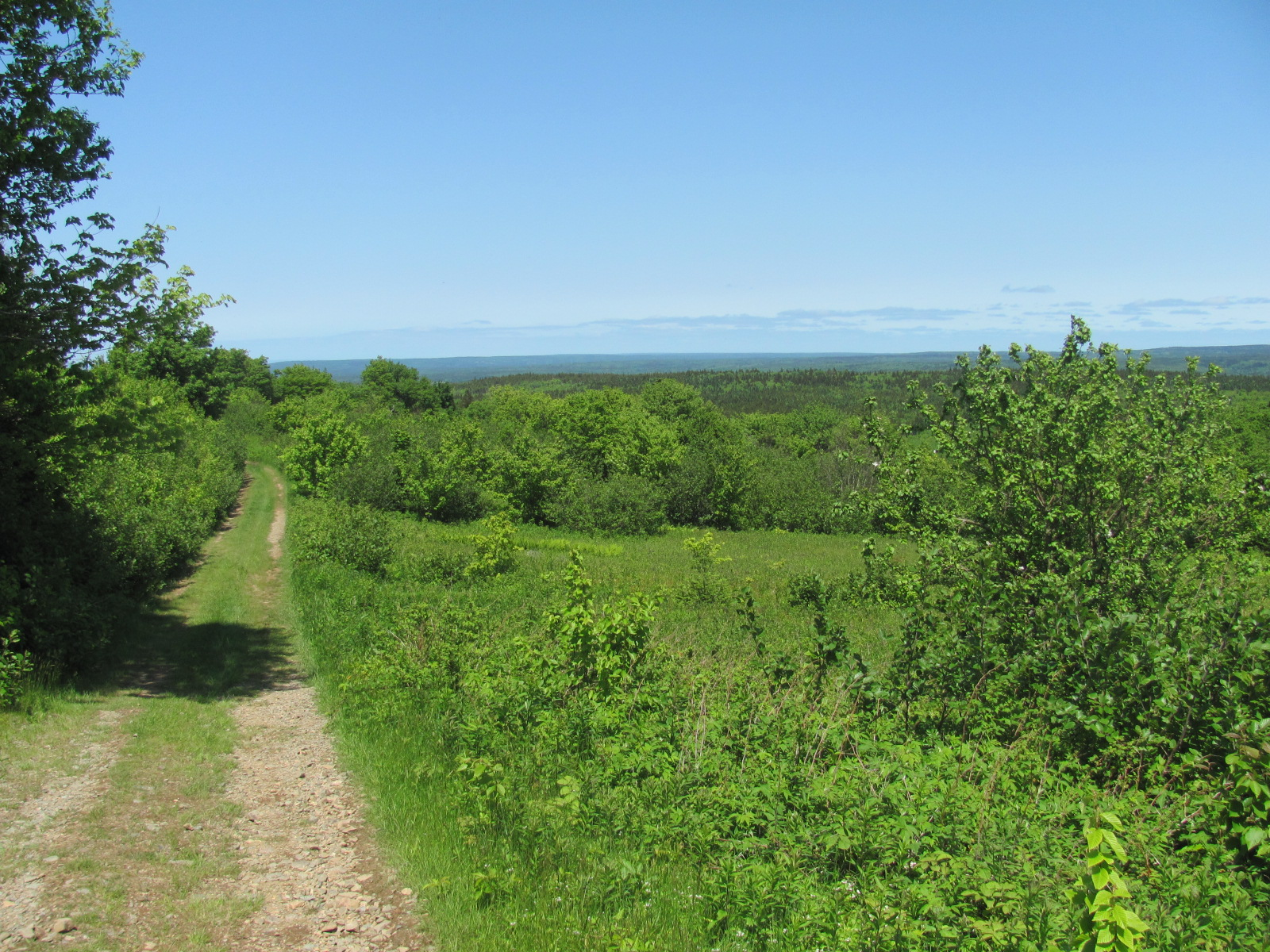
The abandoned farm fields of New Yarmouth

Land at New Yarmouth was first granted to Loyalist John Hall in 1785 and later granted to Alexander and John Grant in 1819 although neither family appear to have settled at New Yarmouth. By 1873, the Copps and Brown families had settled in the community. The expansion of lumbering in the Cape Chignecto area in the late 1800s brought more families to the area.

By 1904, the community had 10 homes and a school around the intersection of the New Yarmouth Road and Eatonville Road. The Wasson family became important landowners in New Yarmouth and contracted out timber lands, ran lumber camps for mills, and provided horse teams. However, a collapse in timber prices in the early 1920s caused many mills to close and logging operations around New Yarmouth declined. The school house closed and was moved to nearby Advocate where it was converted to a dwelling.

By the early 1950s, isolation and opportunities elsewhere led the last few families to leave, a similar fate also shared by nearby Eatonville as part of a postwar abandonment of isolated farming and forestry communities in Cumberland County. The land was used for blueberry harvesting and pulp wood harvesting by the Minas Basin Pulp and Paper company and later Scott Paper. Minas Basin Pulp and Paper built a fire look out tower at New Yarmouth in the 1940s. The Royal Canadian Air Force proposed building a combined radar and fire tower at New Yarmouth in 1960 to fill a gap in the Pine Tree Line radar system but the post was never built. The fire tower was later taken over the Nova Scotia's Department of Natural Resources and was staffed for many years by Lloyd E. Bennett of Advocate until his retirement in 1999.

The fire tower and cabin remained staffed seasonally by the Department of Natural Resources until 2012. However the fire tower was closed in 2013 by the Department of Natural Resources as part of a province-wide move to replace fire towers by air patrols and citizen reporting and demolished in June 2015.

== Today ==
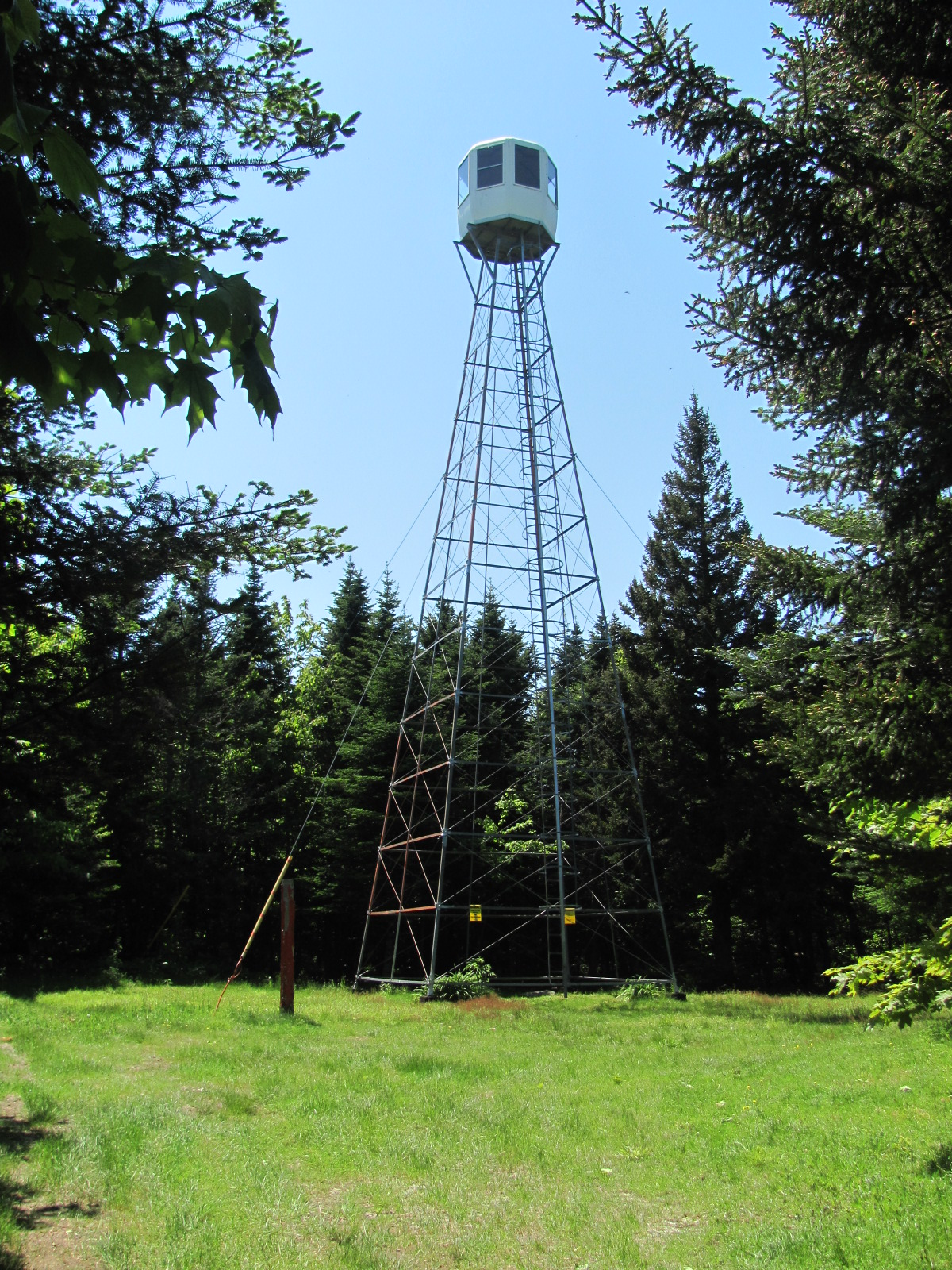
The New Yarmouth Fire Tower

Only fields, overgrown foundations, and a few hunting cabins remain at New Yarmouth. In 1989 the Cape Chignecto Provincial Park acquired some of the land where New Yarmouth once stood. The park's largest campsite is located in New Yarmouth and the park's main backpacking trail skirts the western edge of New Yarmouth. Blueberry fields are cultivated on some of the old farmlands. The road through New Yarmouth is used by park maintenance staff, hikers and hunters.
