= Chedabucto Fault =

Coordinates: 45°26′36.76″N 63°6′30.51″W

The Chedabucto Fault is a fault that divides Mainland Nova Scotia from the Minas Basin in the west to Chedabucto Bay in the east into the Avalon zone in the north and the Meguma Zone in the south. The Avalon and Meguma Zones are different because they belonged to different land masses that were widely separated from one another. The Avalon Zone was a part of Laurasia, while the Meguma Zone was a part of Gondwana. It marks the southern margin of the Cobequid Mountains. The Cobequid-Chedabucto Fault Zone is the most prominent geological feature of Nova Scotia.
