= Cape Chignecto Provincial Park =

Provincial park in Nova Scotia, Canada

- IUCN category II (national park)
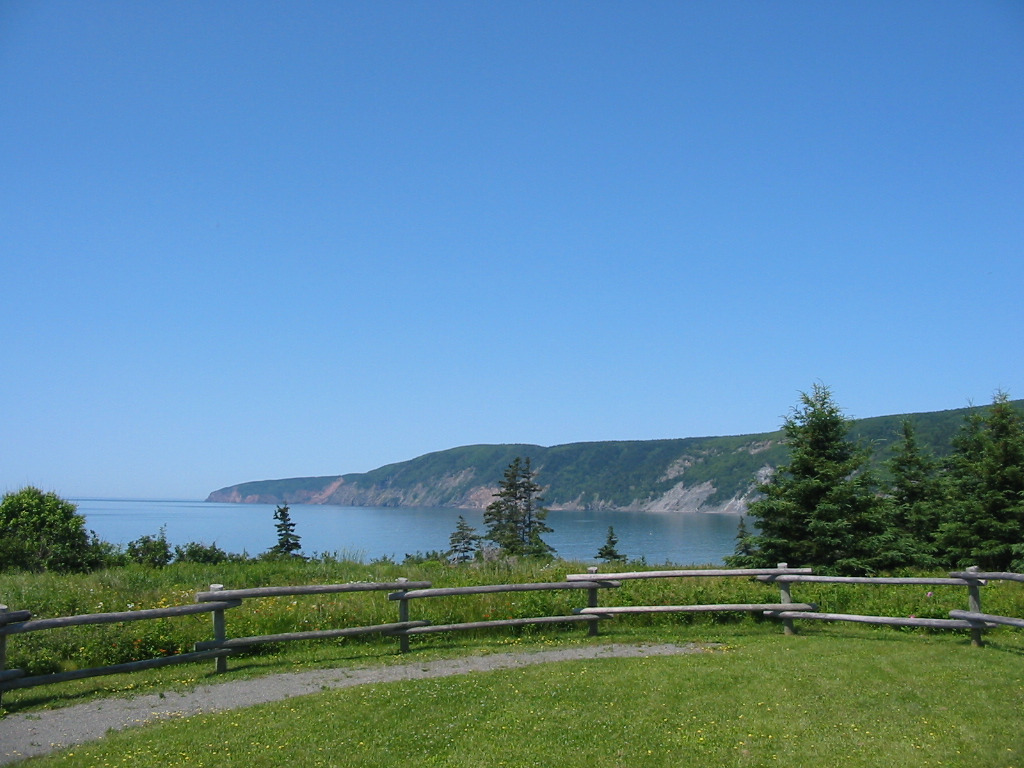
- The cliffs of Cape Chignecto viewed from Red Rocks trailhead and visitor centre
- Interactive map of Cape Chignecto Provincial Park
- Location: Nova Scotia, Canada
- Nearest city: Amherst, Nova Scotia, Truro, Nova Scotia
- Coordinates: 45°21′01″N 64°49′30.5″W
- Area: 42 km^{2} (16 sq mi), 4,200 ha (10,000 acres)
- Established: 1989
- Governing body: Nova Scotia Department of Natural Resources

Cape Chignecto Provincial Park is a Canadian provincial park located in Nova Scotia. A wilderness park, it derives its name from Cape Chignecto, a prominent headland which divides the Bay of Fundy with Chignecto Bay to the north and the Minas Channel leading to the Minas Basin to the east. The park, which opened in 1998, is the largest provincial park in Nova Scotia. It also anchors one end of the UNESCO Cliffs of Fundy Global Geopark.

== Landscape ==
The park's landscape is renowned for spectacular shoreline with extensive backpacking trails and scenic day hikes. The highest cliffs in Mainland Nova Scotia are located along the park's southern coast, measuring 200 metres (600 ft). The park occupies 42 square kilometres (16 sq mi) and has 30 kilometres (19 mi) of wilderness coastline with unique geological features such as raised beaches, caves and sea stacks. The complex geology was created by continental collision along the Cobequid fault. The spectacular coastal landscapes of the park make it popular for hikers and kayakers. It also contains several abandoned logging camps, saw mills and the ghost towns of Eatonville and New Yarmouth. A secluded ravine named Refugee Cove was the site where Mi'kmaq sheltered fleeing Acadians during the Expulsion of the Acadians.

The mixing of warm summer temperatures with the cold tidal waters of the Bay of Fundy create frequent fogs resulting in moist rain forest-like conditions which nurture "fog forests" of large red spruce and many unique and endangered species of lichens. The park's high southern cliffs support species of vetch and primrose with Alpine characteristics which are unique in Nova Scotia. Cape Chignecto also provides shelter for Nova Scotia's endangered mainland moose herd.

Tides rise and fall 12 metres along the park's coastline, producing rip currents and rapid flooding at certain points. Several hikers have been trapped and had to be rescued when rising tides trapped them against sheer cliffs, including a couple and a dog who had to be rescued from rising waters at Eatonville by a helicopter from CFB Greenwood in July 2014.

== Facilities ==
The park maintains over 50 kilometres of trails, both for day use hikers and overnight backpackers. An interpretation centre, picnic area, washrooms and giftshop are based at the trailhead at Red Rocks near the community of Advocate Harbour. In addition to 51 back country campsites and 28 walk-in sites, several overnight cabins and bunk houses on the trail system may be rented by hikers. A mothballed fire tower, closed since 2012, is located at the highest point of the park in New Yarmouth. A new, off-grid interpretation centre and day use trails at Eatonville were constructed in 2008–2009. Partially funded by a federal-provincial contribution of $350,000 announced in July 2008, the centre's completion was delayed by bad weather but opened on July 30, 2009. The Cape Chignecto Trails are part of the 400 km Cape to Cape hiking trail system under construction to connect Cape Chignecto with Cape George, Antigonish County. The park is open from mid June to mid October. It is accessible from Route 209 and is one of the features on the Fundy Shore Ecotour.

== History of the park ==
The Government of Nova Scotia purchased the land currently comprising the park in 1989 and added it to the Crown land reserve, administered by the Department of Natural Resources. This land was redesignated for a provincial park in the mid-1990s and Cape Chignecto Provincial Park opened to the public in 1998 after several years of planning and trail and campsite development. By area, Cape Chignecto is the largest provincial park in Nova Scotia.

Although Cape Chignecto is Nova Scotia's largest provincial park and is owned administered by Nova Scotia's Department of Natural Resources, it was created, and until 2012, run by a local community development organization, the Cumberland Regional Economic Development Association. The park was operated by a very small seasonal staff based in Advocate and Amherst, Nova Scotia. However, in the spring of 2012 the Department of Natural Resources took over management of the park and brought its fees in line with other provincial parks. In 2020, the Park was designated as part of the UNESCO "Cliffs of Fundy Global Geopark with the Three Sisters Day Use trails at Eatonville marking the beginning of the Geopark which stretches all around Cape Chignecto and down the coast to Debert.

== Pictures ==
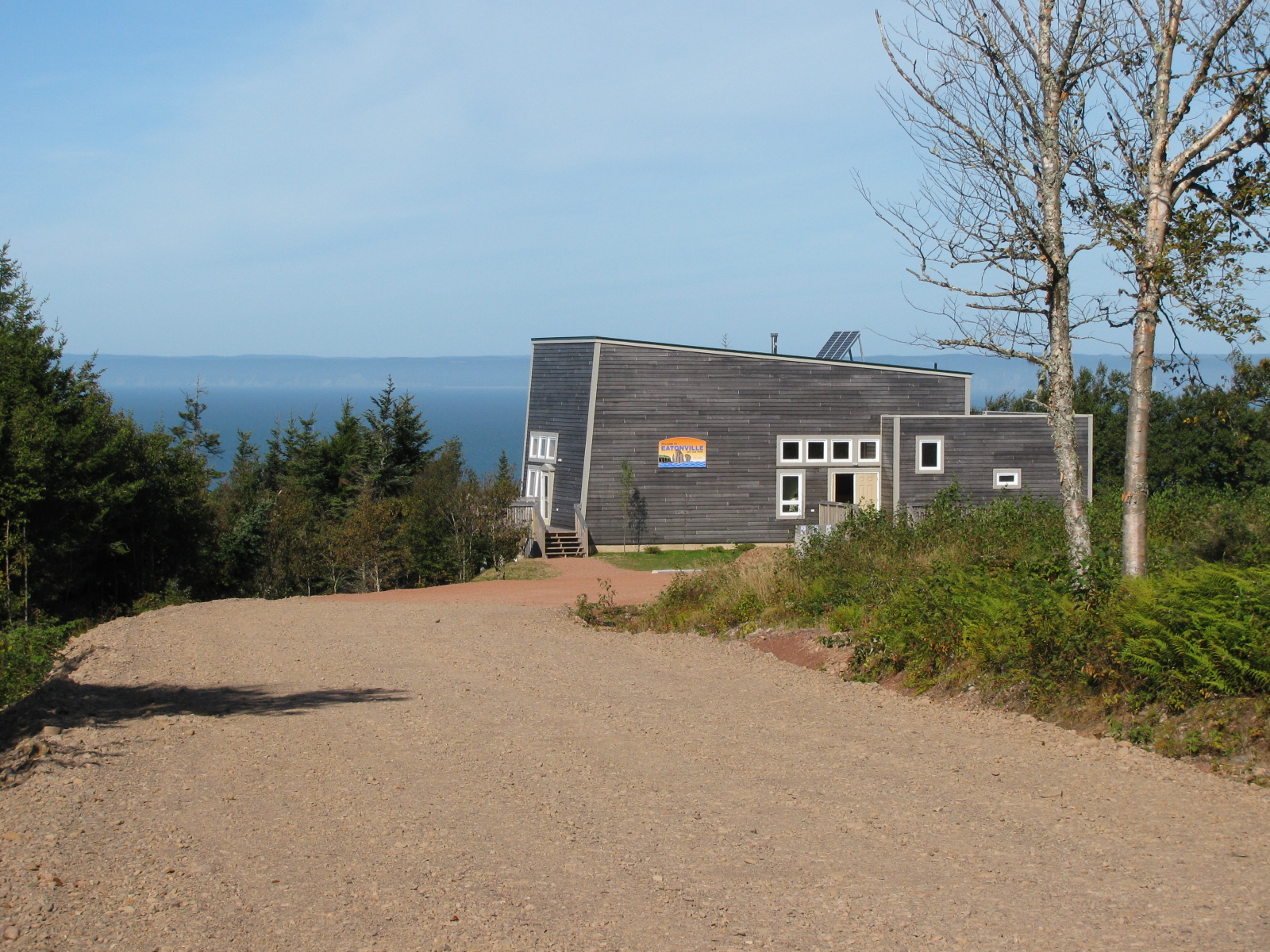
Eatonville Interpretation Centre

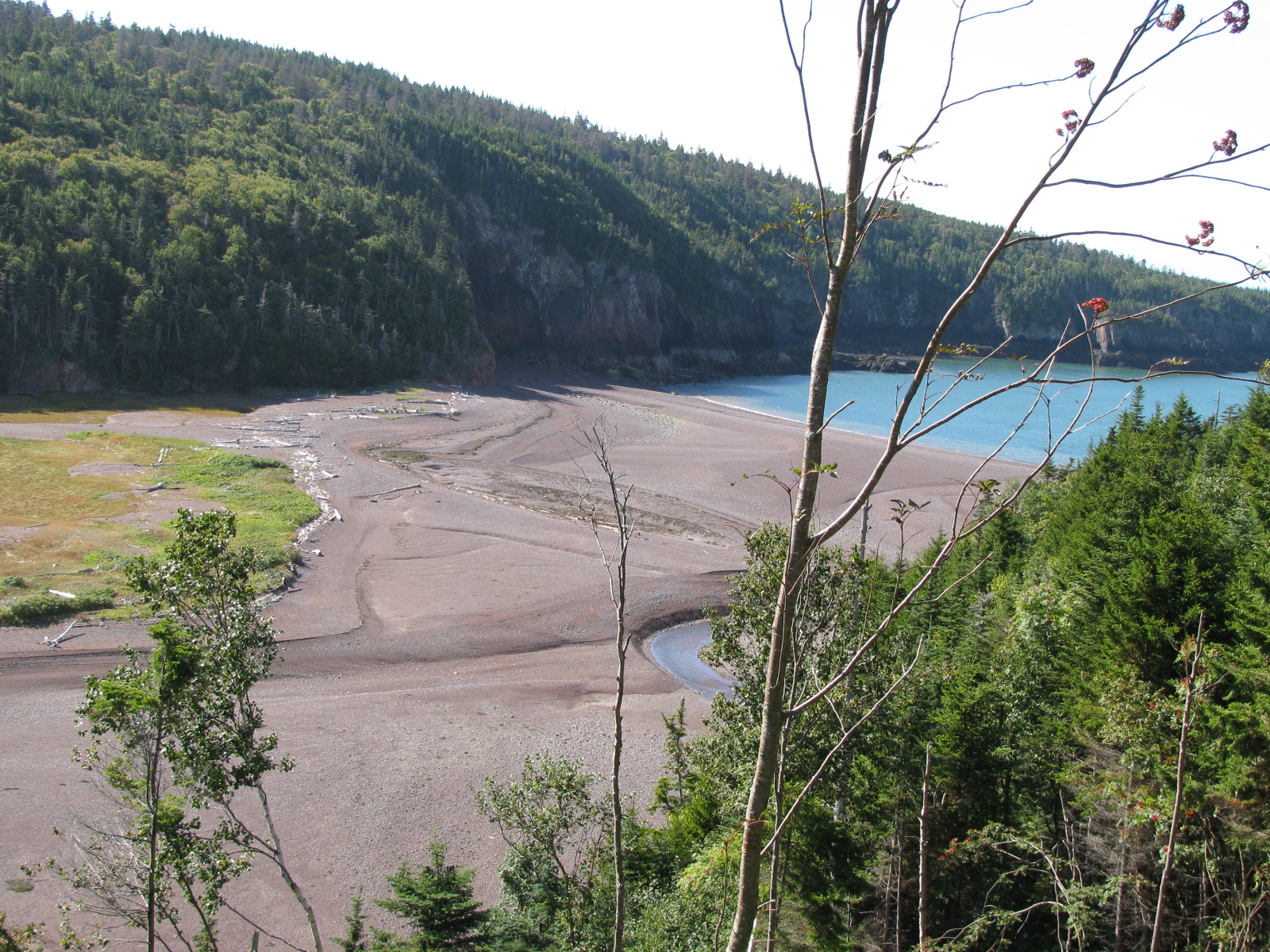
The park as viewed from atop the Eatonville Interpretation Centre

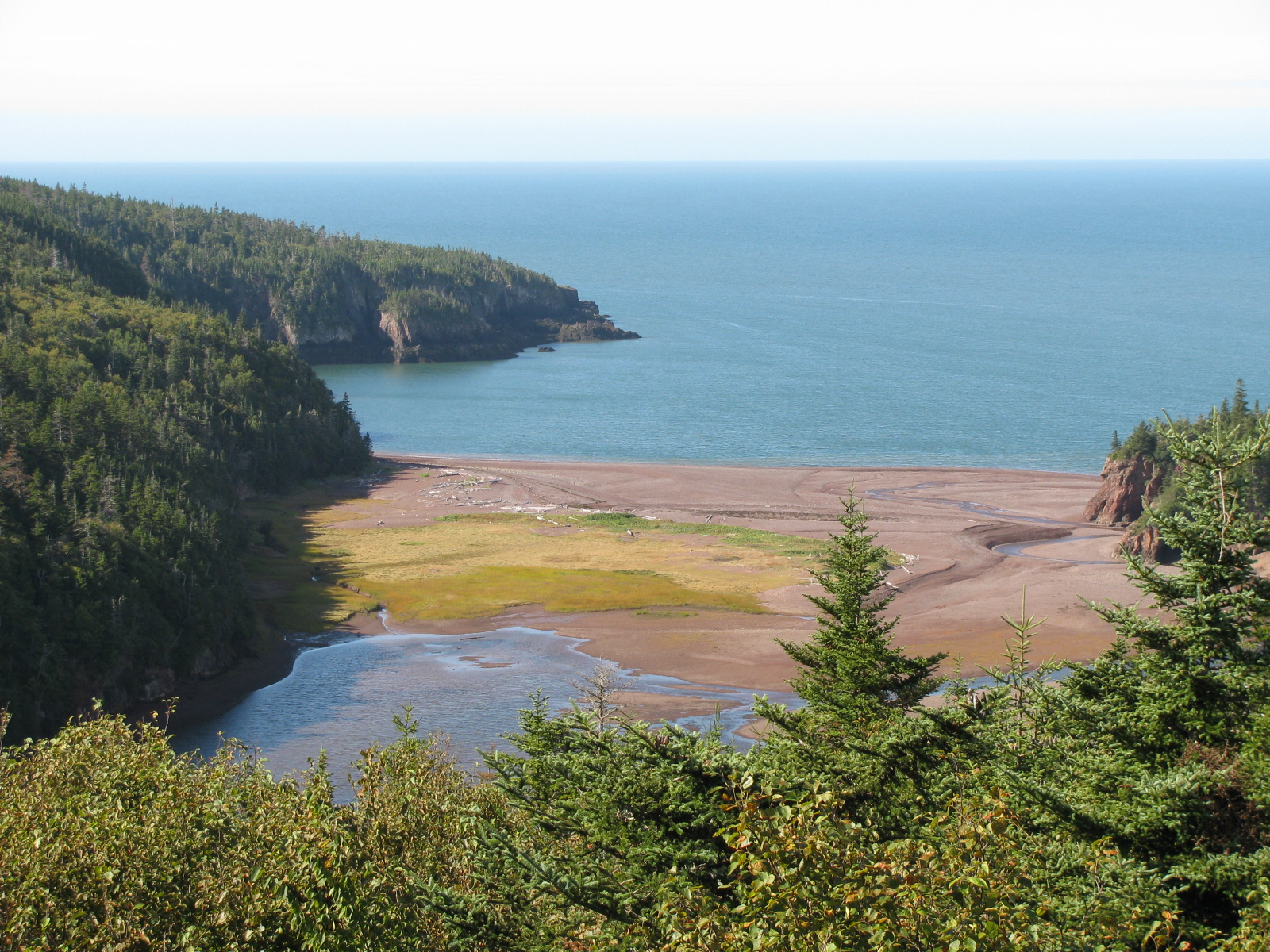
Eatonville Harbour saltmarsh and site of former mill and shipyard

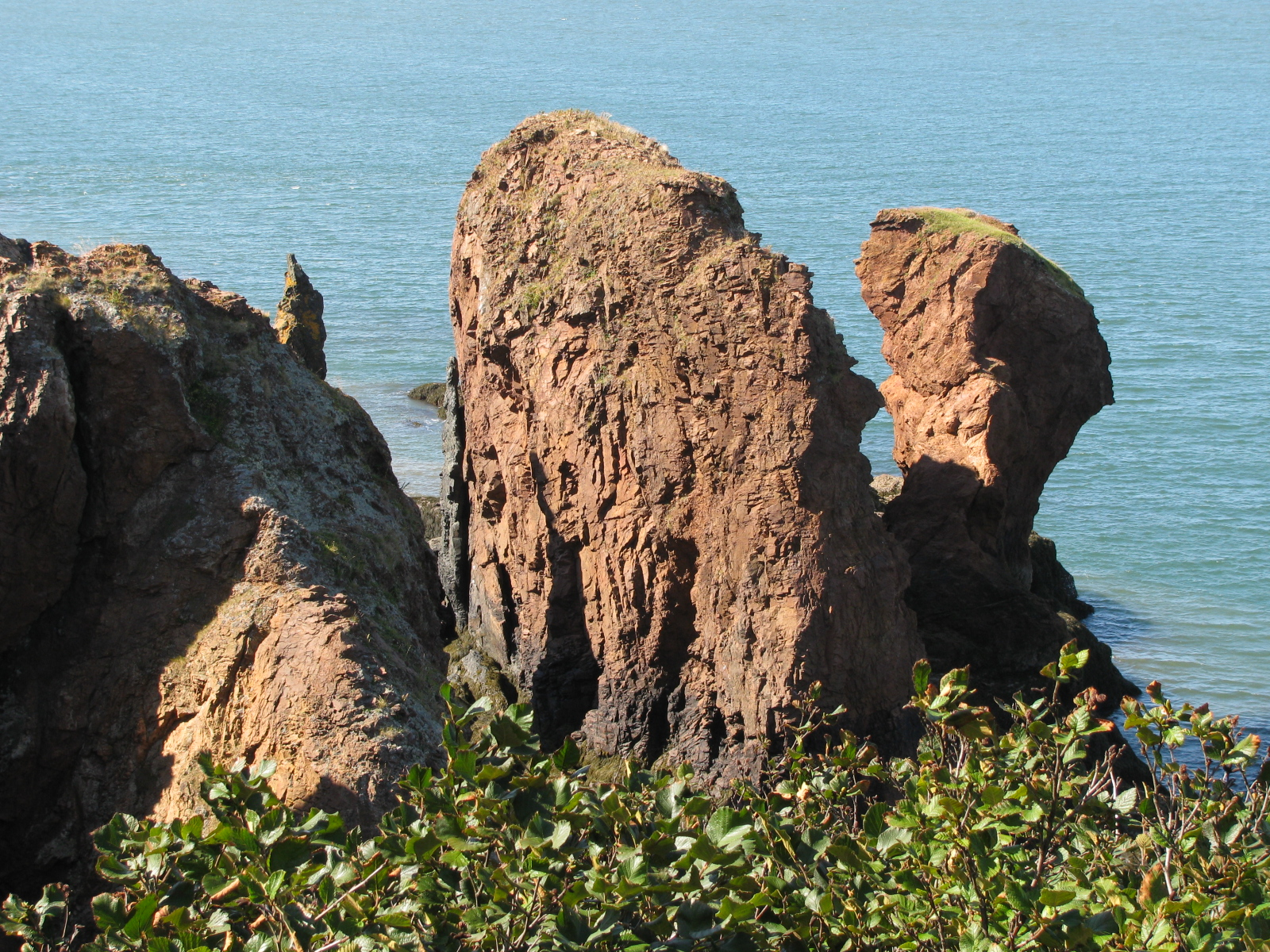
The "Three Sisters" sea stacks at Eatonville

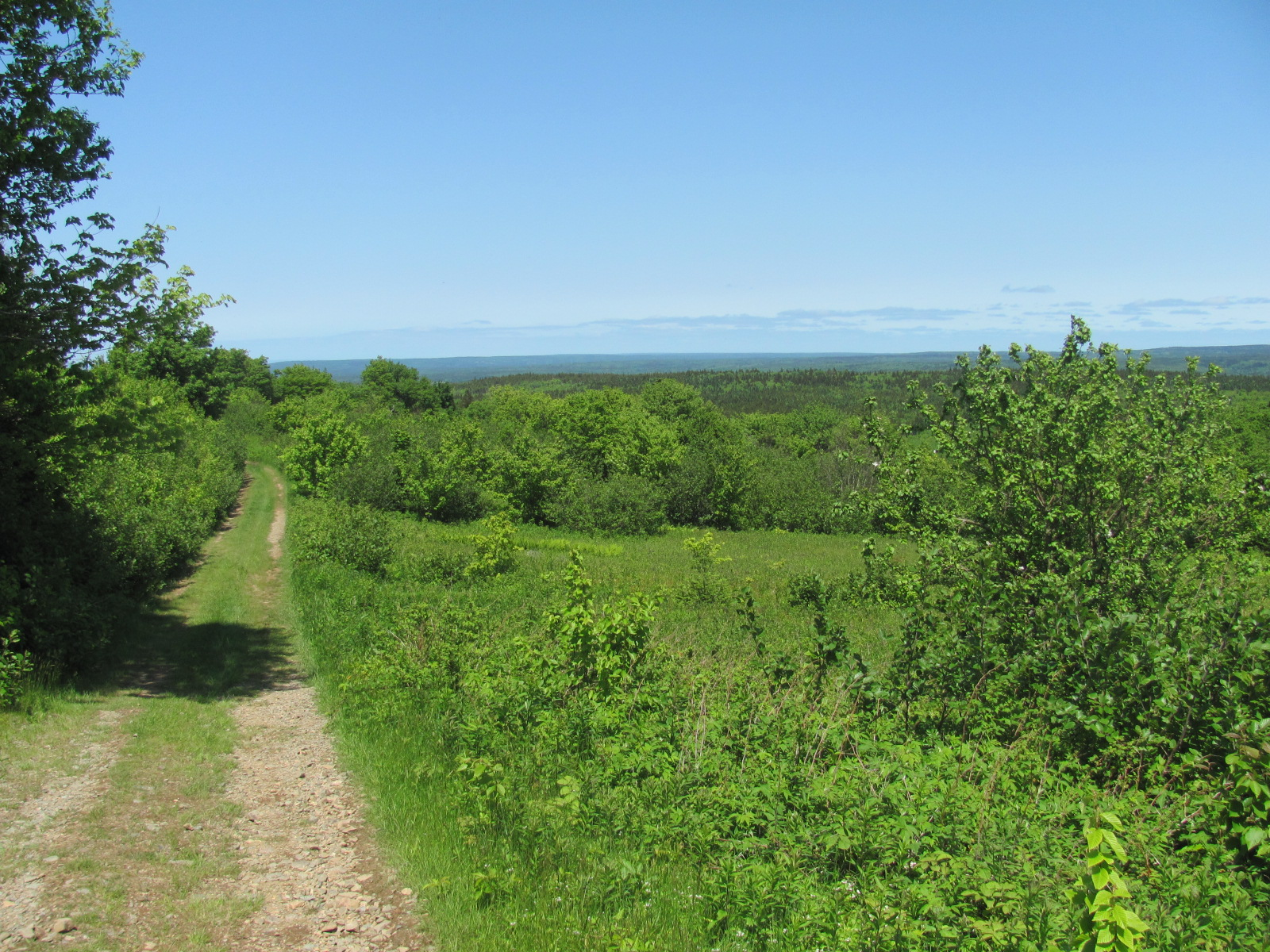
The abandoned upland farm fields of New Yarmouth
