= Eatonville, Nova Scotia =

Eatonville, Nova Scotia (formerly Three Sisters)
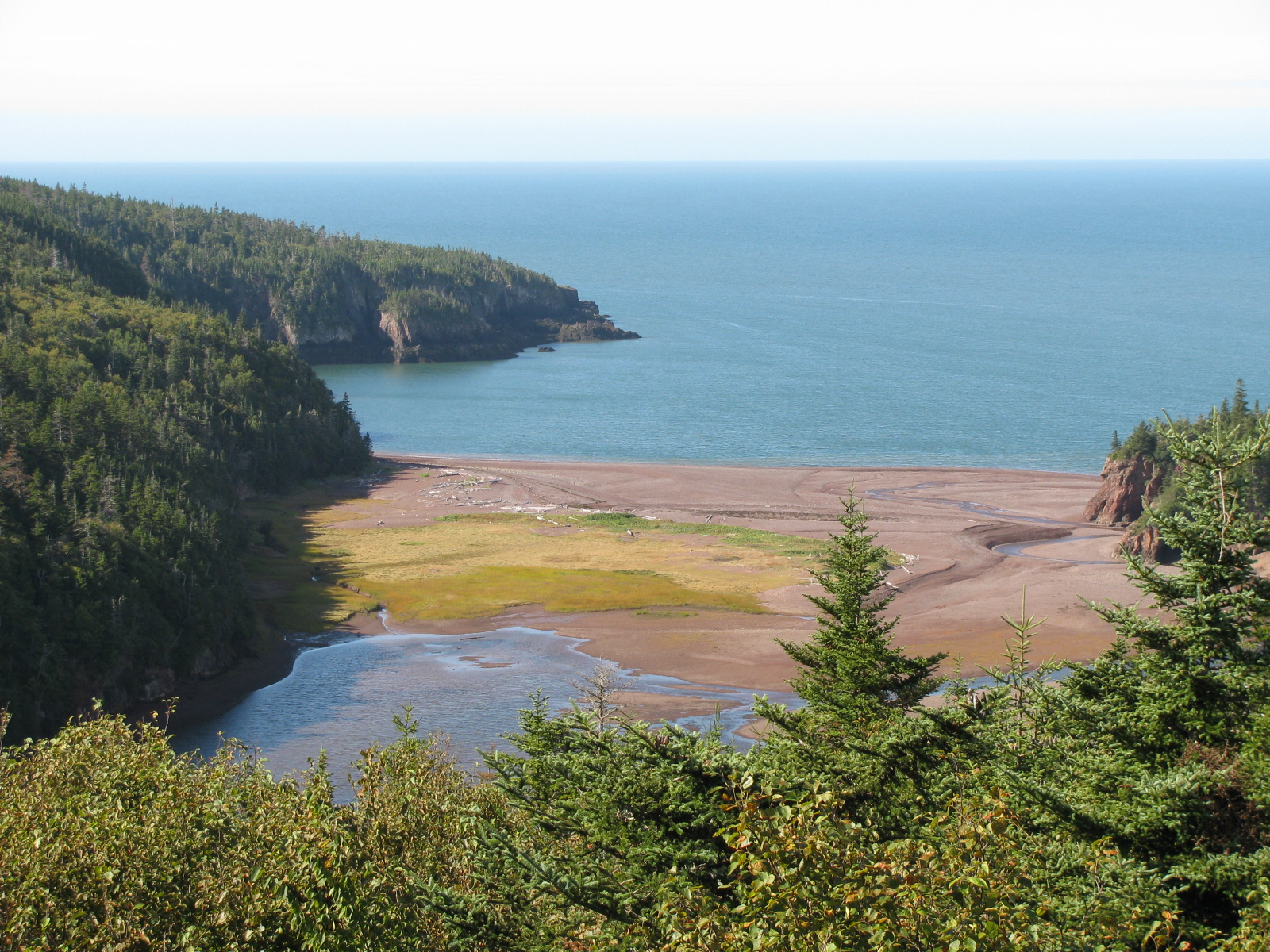
- Eatonville Harbour, showing the site of the mill and shipyard

- Location of Eatonville in Nova Scotia
- Coordinates: 45°25′12.5″N 64°54′55.2″W
- Country: Canada
- Province: Nova Scotia
- Founded: 1826
- Abandoned: circa 1940

Population
  - mid-1880s: 350 (Peak)
- Website: www.novascotiaparks.ca/parks/cape-chignecto.asp#facilities

Eatonville is a former lumber and shipbuilding village in Cumberland County, Nova Scotia. It includes a large tidal harbour at the mouth of the Eatonville Brook beside several dramatic sea stacks known as the "Three Sisters". It was founded in 1826 and abandoned in the 1940s. The site of the village is now part of Cape Chignecto Provincial Park.

== Early history ==
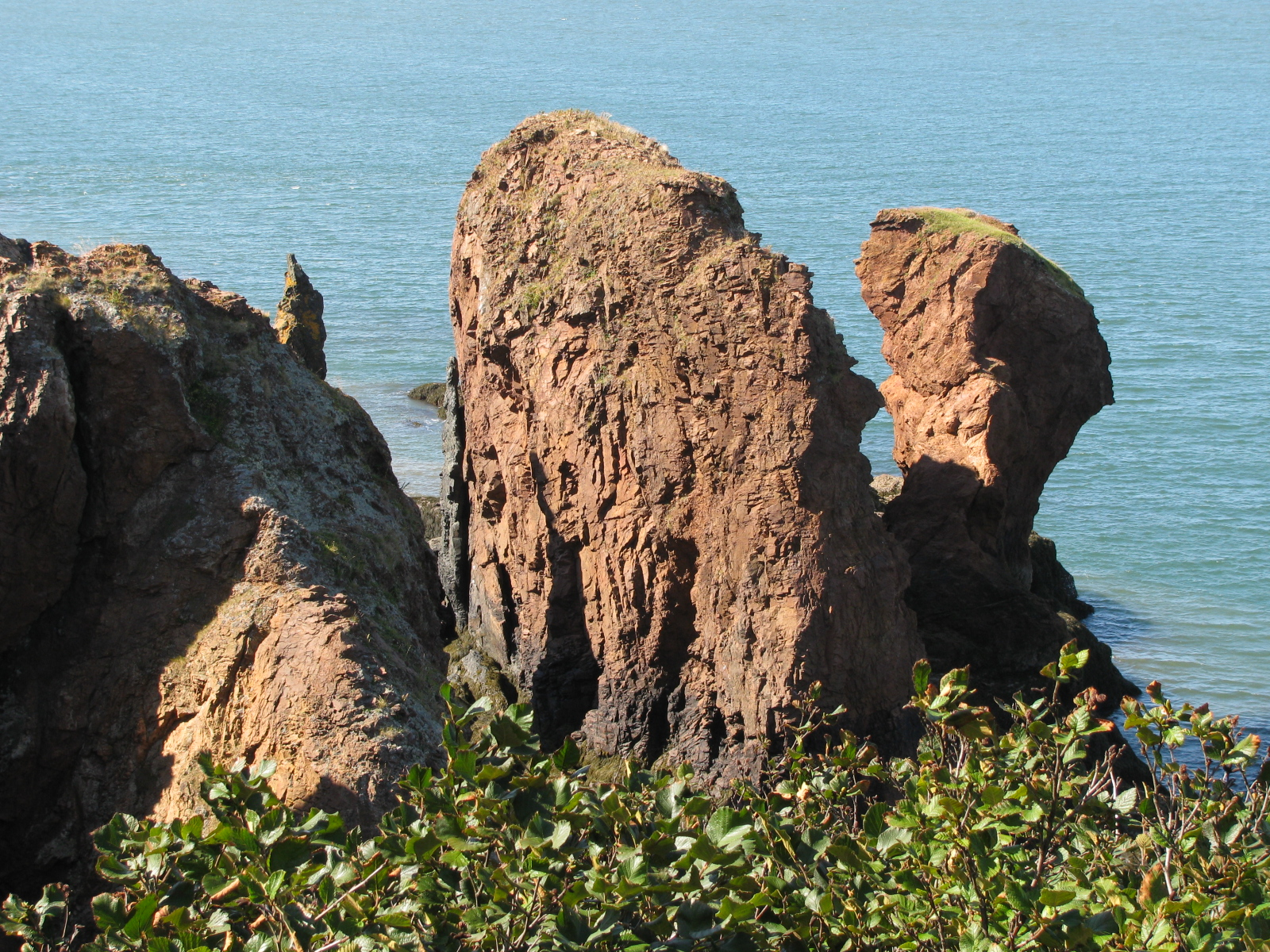
The "Three Sisters" sea stacks

The complex geology of Eatonville Harbour and powerful erosion forces of the Bay of Fundy tides created a series of dramatic sea stacks, stone arches and caves. Three of the sea stacks are closely grouped and known as the "Three Sisters". According to a Mi'kmaw legend, they were created by the mythical figure Glooscap when he turned a pack of dogs pursuing a moose into the stone towers. The fleeing moose became the Isle Haute and can be seen in the distance from the frozen stone forms of the Three Sisters.

Settlers established a small sawmill on crown land at the tidal harbour beside the sea stacks about 1826. Early families at the settlement which became known as "Three Sisters" included the McDade, McNamara, Atkinson and Spicer families. By 1837 they had built a rough, but much-used road to Advocate, the beginnings of what came to be known as the "Eatonville Road". The land around the community was granted to James McDade in 1851. The land around the harbour and extensive timber holdings inland along Cape Chignecto were purchased by David Rufus Eaton and Charles Frederick Eaton in 1864.

== Shipbuilding ==
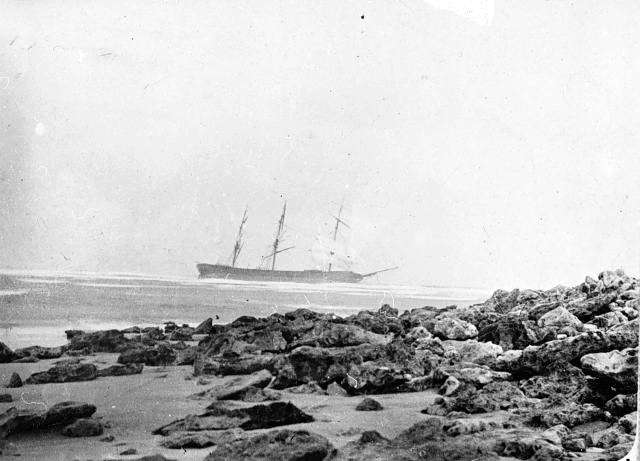
The Eatonville ship Joseph H. Scammell shipwrecked at Torquay, Australia in 1884

The Eatons built a series of saw mills, lumber camps and a large shipyard. The growing settlement around their mills was named after their family. A shipyard at the harbour produced over 20 large vessels beginning with the 1000 ton barque Chignecto in 1874 and finishing with the tern schooner J. L. Ralston in 1919.

Eatonville ships were noteworthy enough to attract coverage from Harpers Weekly Magazine which published an illustrated feature article on the launch of the barque Argenta at the Eaton's yard in 1890. A notable example was the large ship Joseph H. Scammell built at Eatonville in 1884 which became a famous shipwreck in Australia when she sank in 1891. Eatonville Harbour attracted considerable shipping for the timber export trade. Two small tugs were based at the harbour to assist in docking ships and moving timber rafts and the volume of shipping led to the construction of the Eatonville Lighthouses on the beach south of the wharf which operated from 1909 to 1923.

The harbour witnessed several shipwrecks including the spectacular wreck of the three masted schooner Marjorie J. Sumner which was severely damaged in the harbour in 1906 when it toppled over at low tide and was crushed by its large deckload of timber. The shipyard and large sawmill were located at the harbour while the main village, known as "the Old Town" was located 1 mile (2 km) inland. The two were connected by a "tramway", a horse-drawn pole railway.

== Lumber Industry ==
The Eaton's first sawmill was upriver in the "Old Town". In the 1890s, they built a much larger sawmill at Eatonville Harbour. The mill was a large steam-powered operation which could produce 60,000 board feet (100 m^{3}) of lumber a day, but the Eatons "preferred to cut less, waste nothing and strive for quality." This allowed them to make the most sustainable use of their Cape Chignecto timber holdings which also had the advantage of very few forest fires because the "fog forests" of Cape Chignecto are constantly damp from Bay of Fundy fogs.

A network of logging camps across Cape Chignecto connected by trails and log driving streams fed the Eatonville Mills while the adjacent settlement of New Yarmouth provided supplies, horse teams and workers. The village had a population of 350 people in its peak years. About 250 people lived in the Old Town which included a post office, two stores, a combined school and church and a blacksmith shop. About 100 people lived in Eatonville Harbour which had a separate post office and a large store. The store attracted customers from surrounding villages across eastern Cumberland County, drawn by its extensive array of imported goods. The store boasted fine parquet floors and one of the earliest telephone connections in the area.

== Decline ==
The Eatons sold their holdings to the Elderkin family in 1897. The population dwindled after World War One as timber stands were exhausted and wooden shipbuilding collapsed. The large mill was eventually destroyed by fire. The village was largely abandoned by the 1930s. Seasonal cutting and exports of timber from scows continued into the 1940s. The last year-round resident left in 1943, although the descendants of several Eatonville families maintain cabins in the area. The surrounding forests were logged by various Cumberland County Mills but especially for pulpwood by the Scott Paper Company until the 1980s.

== Present day ==
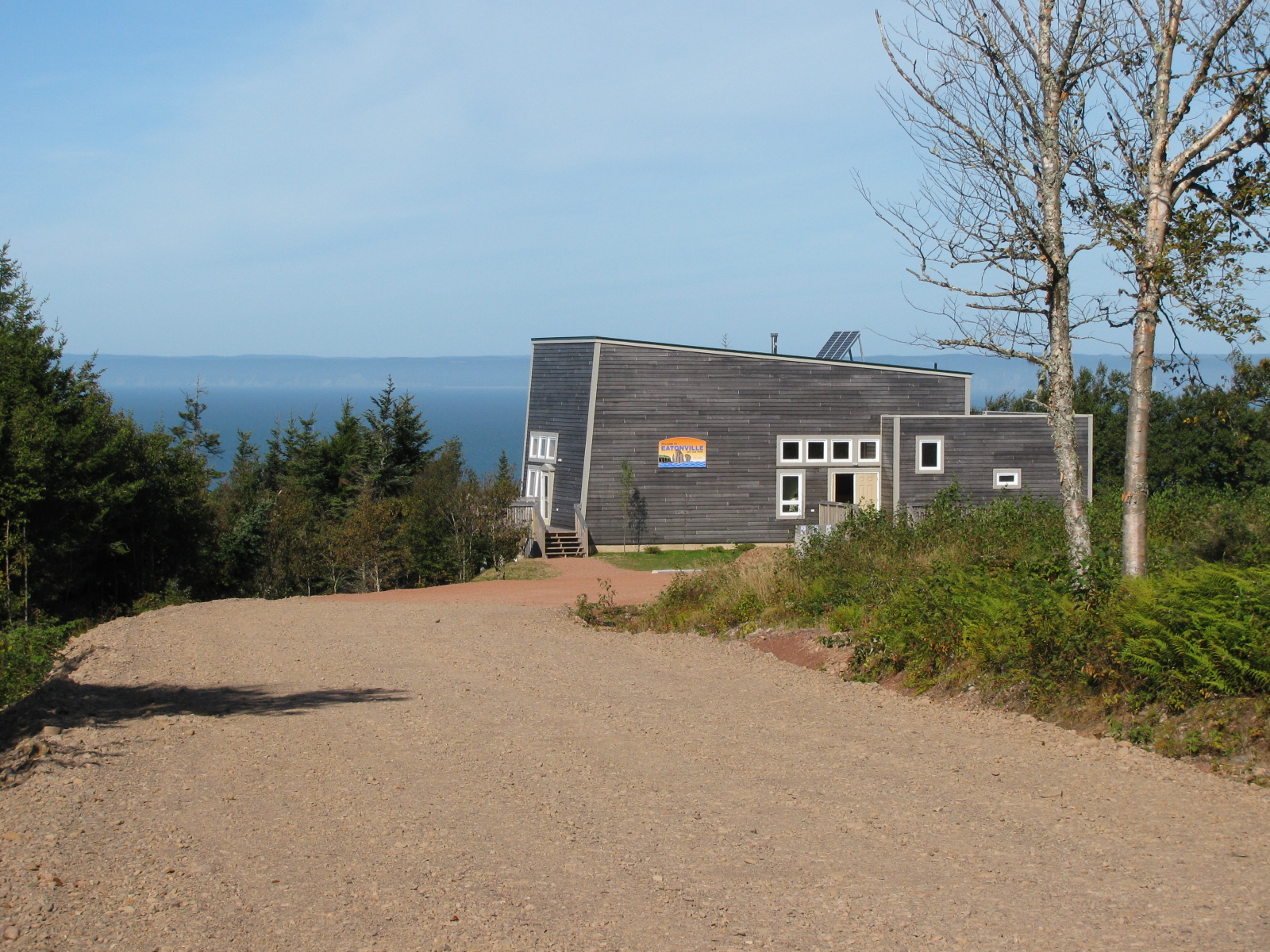
Eatonville Interpretation Centre in 2009

The Eatonville Road became a seasonal wilderness public road for off-road vehicles maintained by volunteers from Advocate to Eatonville and through to Spicers Cove. In 1989, the Eatonville site became part of Cape Chignecto Provincial Park. The old village site is crossed by the park's main backpacking trail which follows the former tramway for several kilometres and connects to a bunkhouse and wilderness campsites at Eatonville's "Old Town" site. The sea stacks and beach at the harbour are a popular kayak destination.

In July 2009, the Park built an "off-the-grid" seasonal interpretation centre accessible by car from Spicers Cove along with a network of short day hikes overlooking the harbour, the Three Sisters sea stacks and a dramatic Raised beach at nearby Squally Point. The interpretation centre closed due to maintenance and environmental problems in 2013, but the Eatonville day use trails and look-offs remained open. In 2020, the Eatonville Day Use trail system centred on the Three Sisters sea stacks became an anchor of the UNESCO Cliffs of Fundy Global Geopark which begin at Eatonville and stretch around Cape Chignecto and down the coast to Debert. The Cliffs of Fundy Geopark organization was able secure funding from the Canadian federal government in May 2026 to repair the building, replacing the siding, windows, doors and repairing some floor joists. The centre reopened for seasonal use in July 2026.

The tidal harbour at Eatonville floods very quickly at high tide and can trap hikers attempting to explore the sea stacks from the beach. Two hikers and a dog were trapped by the tide in 2014 and had to be rescued by a helicopter from CFB Greenwood.
