= Cape Chignecto =

Headland in Nova Scotia, Canada

Coordinates: 45°20′00″N 64°56′57″W

Cape Chignecto in Nova Scotia

Cape Chignecto is a headland located on the Bay of Fundy coast of the Canadian province of Nova Scotia.

Cape Chignecto is located at the westernmost tip of Cumberland County and is the western limit of the Cobequid Hills, a low mountain range that is part of the Appalachian Mountains and extends across the northern part of the Nova Scotia peninsula.

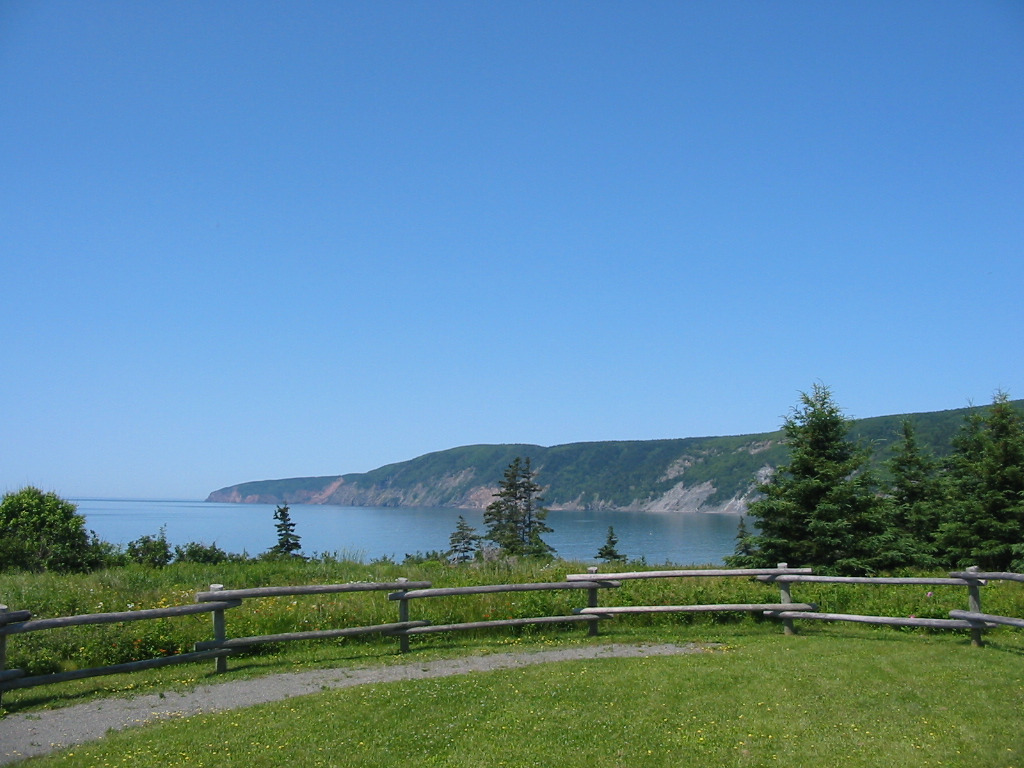
Cape Chignecto viewed from the southeast at the Cape Chignecto Provincial Park trailhead

The cape bifurcates the Bay of Fundy into Chignecto Bay to the north and the Minas Channel, leading to the Minas Basin to the east. Since 1998 the cape has been located within Cape Chignecto Provincial Park, the largest provincial park in the province and a renowned wilderness reserve. The cape features a rugged topography with reportedly the highest cliffs on the Nova Scotia peninsula, created by the upthrusting Cobequid fault.

The cape is mostly uninhabited. It includes the ghost towns of Eatonville and New Yarmouth. The nearest inhabited village is Advocate, Nova Scotia.

The name "Chignecto" derives from the Mi'kmaw name Siknikt, meaning "drainage place", the name of the Mi'kmaq District in which the cape is located.
