= Dory Rips =

Extreme tidal agitation of waters

Coordinates: 45°17′27″N 64°46′27.5″W

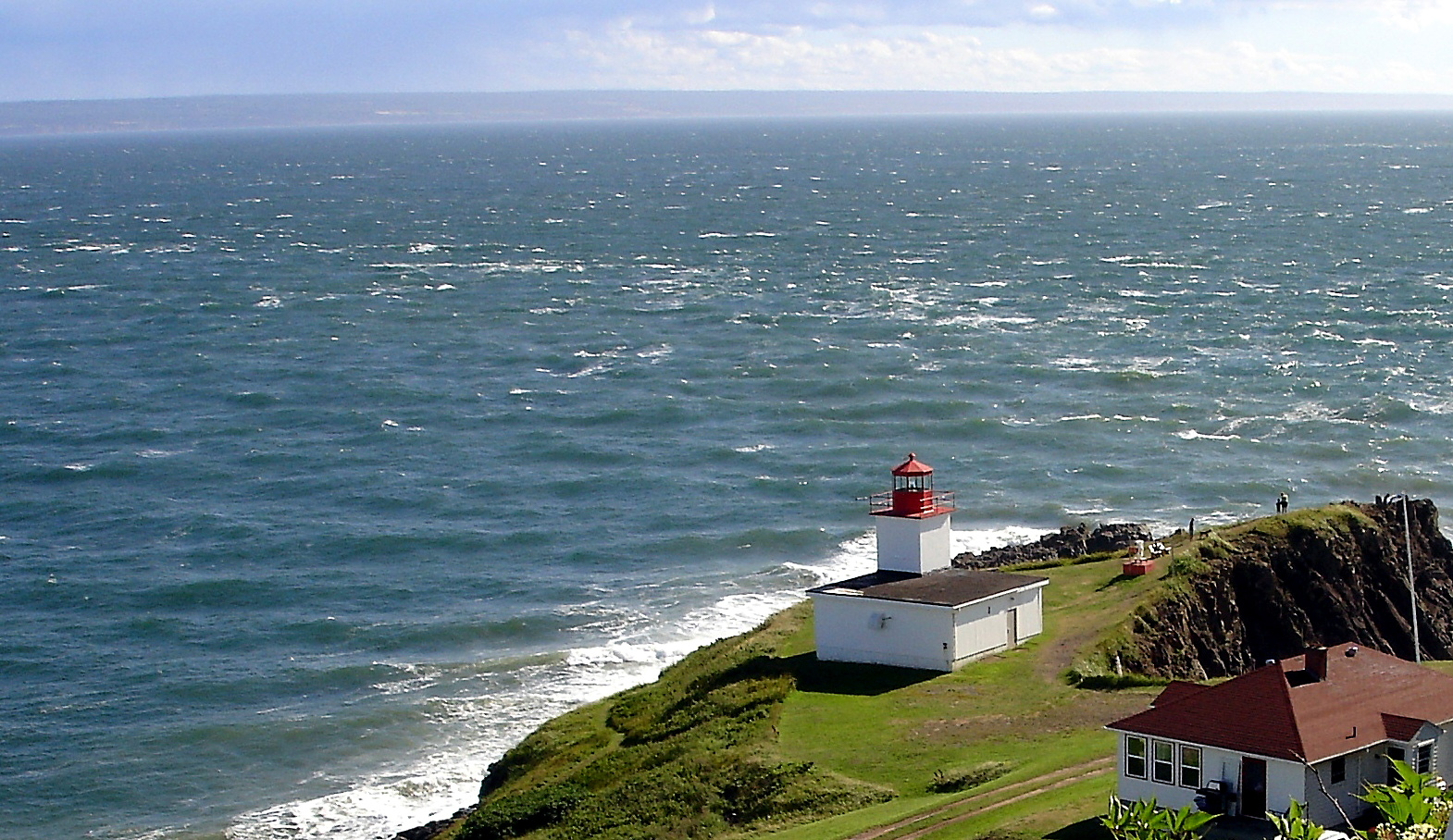
Cape d'Or lighthouse overlooking the Dory Rips

The Dory Rips is a phenomenon involving extreme tidal agitation of waters located in the Bay of Fundy off the headland of Cape d'Or in Nova Scotia, Canada.

The phenomenon occurs at the entrance to the Minas Basin, which is known for the globe's highest tides.

The turbulence does not result from a simple rip tide, but rather from the collision of three opposed tidal currents whose violence is enhanced by the presence of a subsurface reef that forces the water upward. The powerful incoming tidal current loops back and collides with itself while another current, coursing in semicircular fashion around Advocate Bay, slams into the collision point at a 90-degree angle.

== Marine Hazard ==
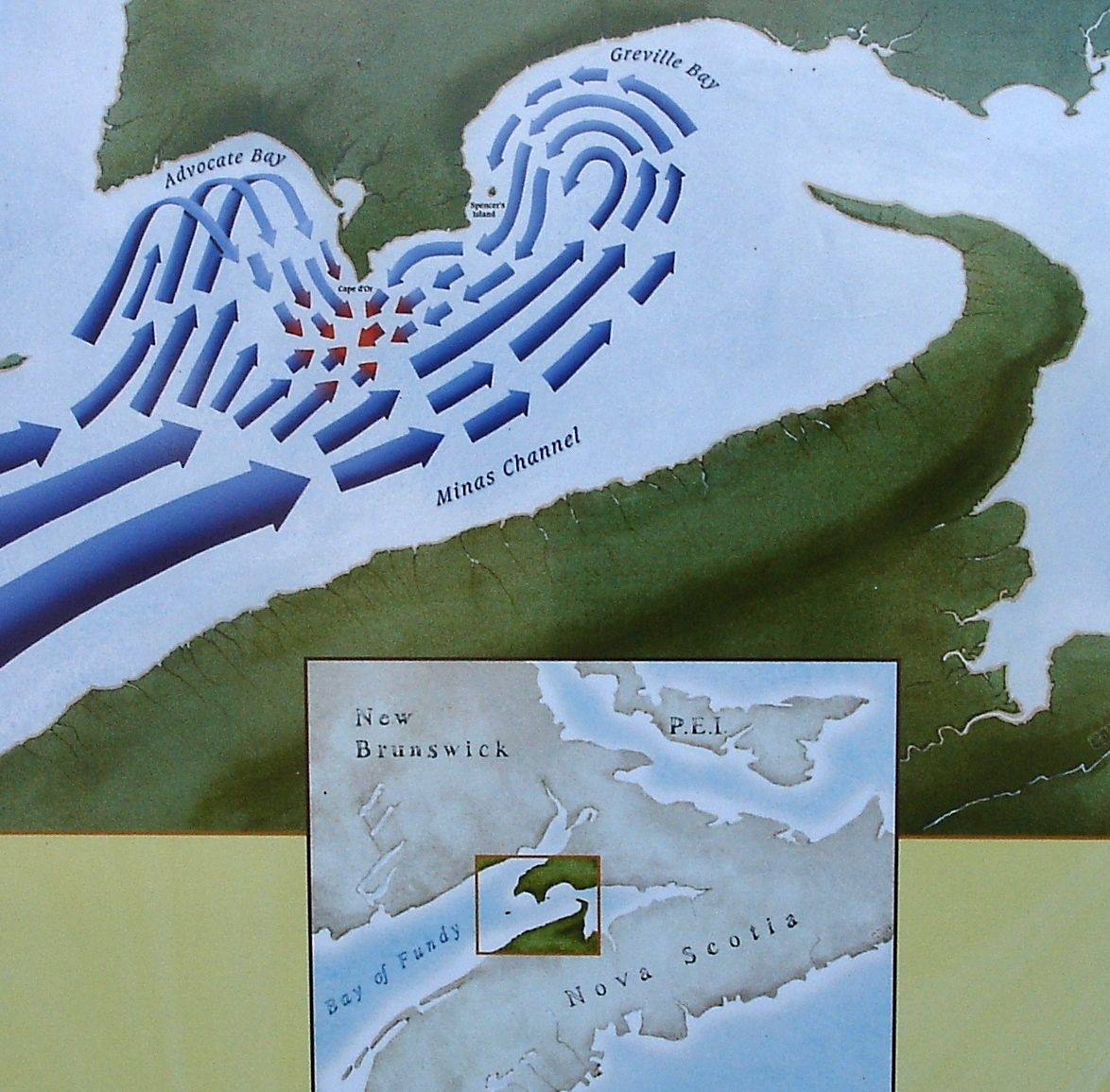
Diagram showing the currents creating the Dory Rips

To warn mariners away from the Dory Rips, a foghorn was placed at Cape d'Or in 1875 and a lighthouse, which is still operational, was established in 1922.

== See also ==
- Rip current
