= Economy, Nova Scotia =

Community in Nova Scotia, Canada

Coordinates: 45°23′N 63°55′W

Location of Economy in Nova Scotia

Economy (2006 pop.: 1,111) is an unincorporated rural community situated along the north shore of the Minas Basin/Cobequid Bay, at approximately 45°23'N, 63°54'W, in Colchester County, Nova Scotia. In the late 19th century, it was known for its shipbuilding industry.

== History ==
The place name comes from the 18th century Acadian L'Économie, an adaptation of the Mi'kmaq First Nation word for the location, kenomee, meaning 'a place of land jutting into the sea'. Mi'kmaqs presumably named the area thus because the shoreline juts out into the Minas Basin at what is now known as Economy Point. East of this point marks the beginning of Cobequid Bay. Mi'kmaqs hunted and gathered throughout the region for thousands of years prior to the settlement of Acadian families in the Economy area.

== Economy ==
The economy is based on logging, firewood, wild lowbush blueberry and weir fishing. There is also a soft-shelled clam digging industry.

== Landmarks ==
Landmark buildings are the Scott house, church and the recently closed historic General Store.
