= Cobequid fault =

Coordinates: 45.38°N 64.07°W

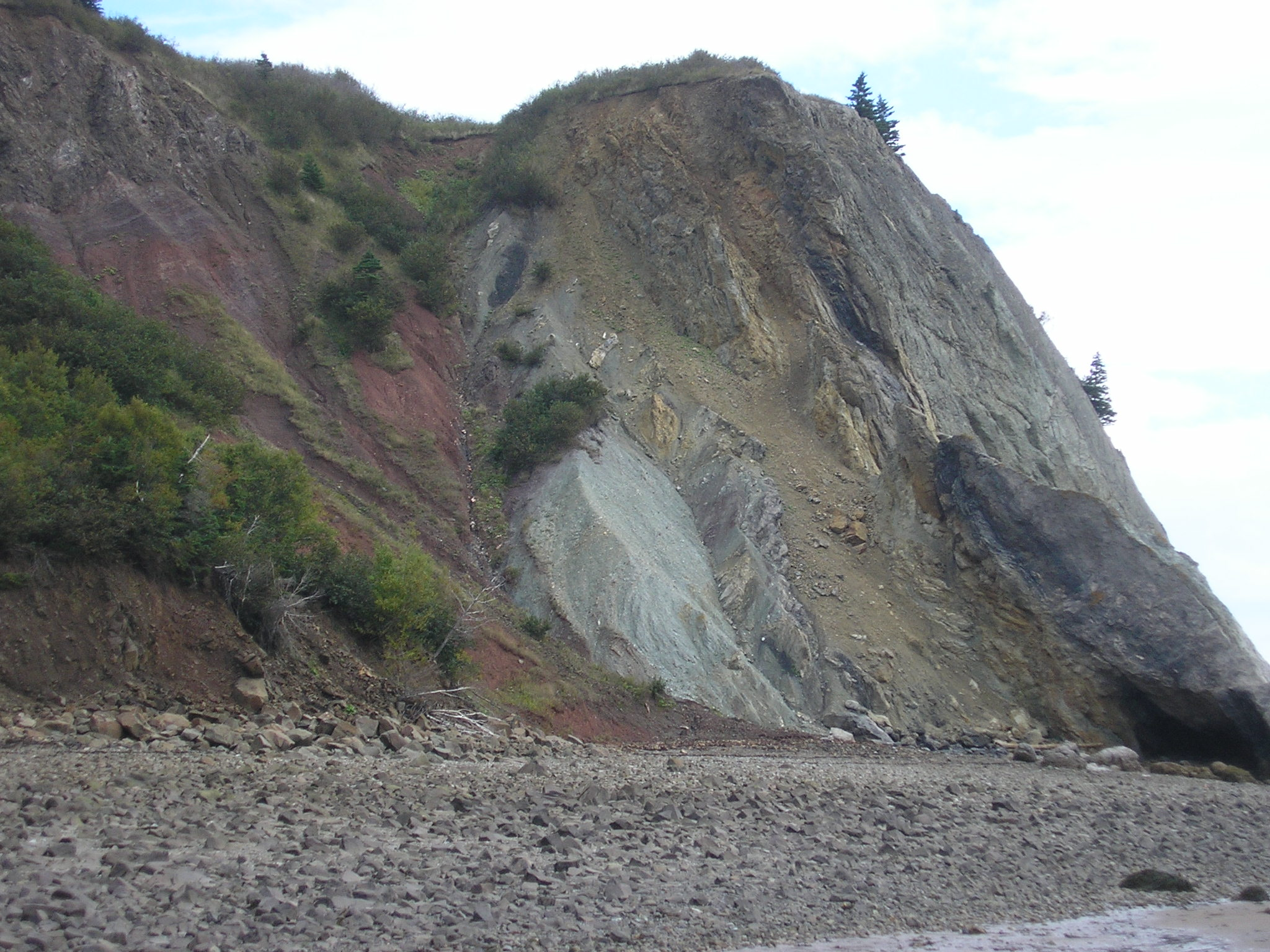
Part of the Cobequid fault zone exposed in cliffs to the west of Clarke Head, near Parrsboro, Nova Scotia, juxtaposing Lower Carboniferous Windsor Group against Upper Triassic to Lower Jurassic Blomidon group.

The Cobequid Fault is a fault that is the extension of the Chedabucto Fault. This fault runs from Truro to Cape Chignecto south of the Cobequid Hills. Both the Cobequid fault and the Chedabucto Fault form the Minas Fault zone splitting Nova Scotia into the Avalon Zone and the Meguma Zone. Movement on the Cobequid Fault started before 400 million years ago and end around 40 million years ago. Between that time around 350 million years violent volcanic eruptions at Spicers Cove north Cape Chignecto Provincial Park and 50 million years after grey sandstone rich in fossil plants were deposited. At Five Islands Provincial Park there are red rocks formed by the large accumulation of mud, sand and gravel around 210 million years ago.
