= Basalt Headlands =

Coordinates: 45°23′38.64″N 63°48′43.28″W

The Basalt Headlands are a chain of intermittent high-cliffed bluffs and islands that fringe the northern edge of the Minas Basin, Nova Scotia, Canada. Its name comes from the basaltic outcrops that formed about 200 million years ago when this region was volcanically active by continental rifting.

== See also ==
- Volcanism of Canada
- Volcanism of Eastern Canada
