= Les Mines =

Coordinates: 45.1°N 64.4°W

Location of Les Mines in Nova Scotia

Les Mines was the name generally applied the Acadian settlements in the western Minas Basin in Nova Scotia. They included the villages of Grand-Pré, New Minas, Rivière-aux-Canards but usually excluded the villages at Pisiguit, Cobequid, and Beaubassin. The name originated with early French explorers who identified copper mines at Cape d'Or as "Les Mines" and the name was gradually transferred to identify the Basin beyond Cape d'Or and its settlements. Founded in the 1680s, the communities which comprised Les Mines grew and prospered based on skilled development of dyked marsh lands for agriculture. However the settlements were destroyed in the 1755 Bay of Fundy Campaign of the Deportation of the Acadians.

== Evolution of the population ==
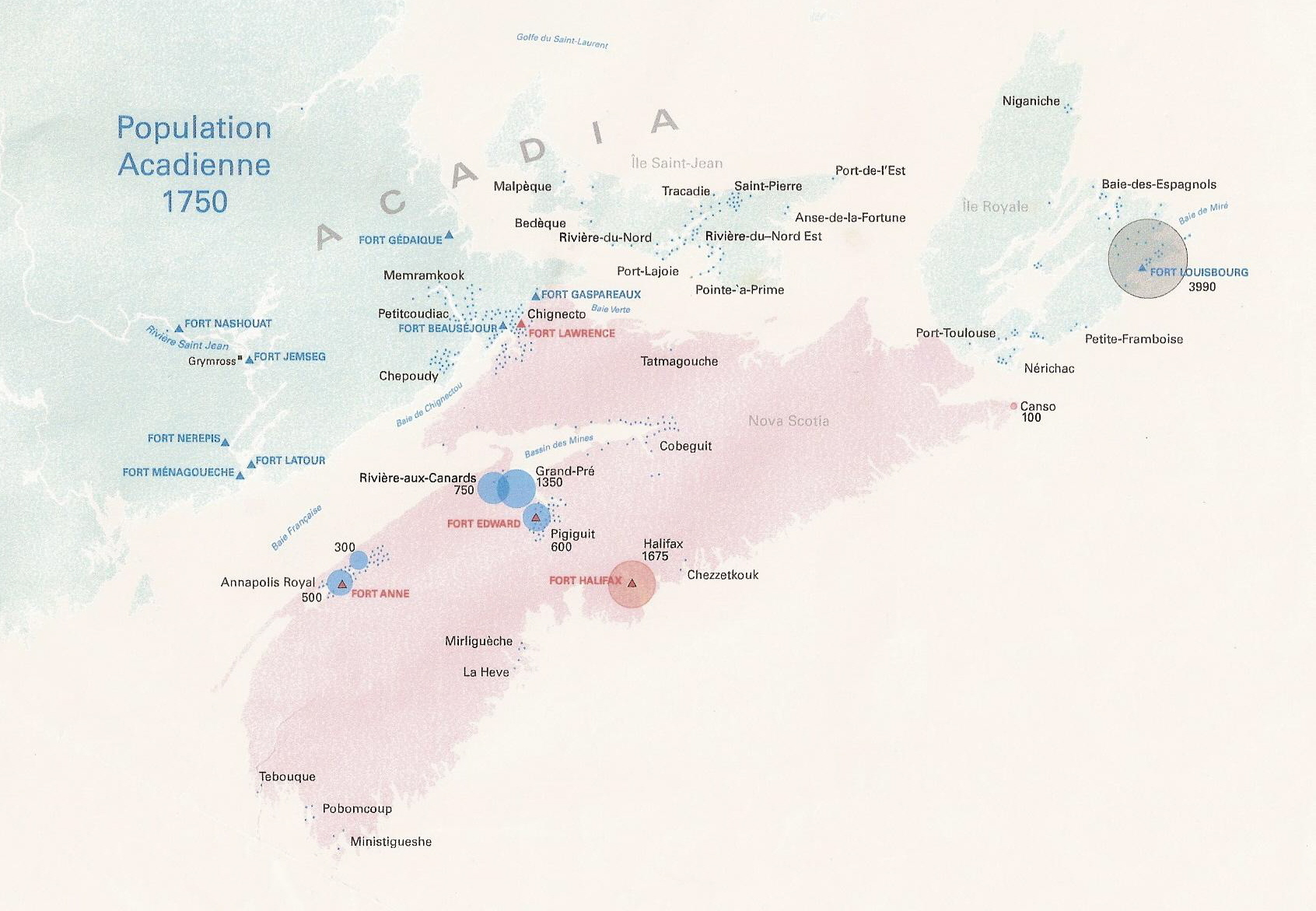
Population of Les Mines in 1750

Year	Inhabitants
1689	57
1689	165
1689	305
1701	487
1703	527
1707	677
1714	1,031
1730	2,500
1737	2,736
1750	2,450
1752	928

From the table, one can notice that by 1752, already more than half the population of Les Mines had migrated to Isle Saint-Jean (P.E.I.) and Isle Royale (Cap Breton).
