= Greenwich, Nova Scotia =

Community in Nova Scotia, Canada

Coordinates: 45°5′1.94″N 64°23′59.48″W

Greenwich in Nova Scotia

Greenwich is a rural community in the Canadian province of Nova Scotia, located in eastern Kings County. It was previously known as Noggins Corner, as travellers could procure a noggin of rum at a local public house.

The community is bordered to the south by the Wolfville Ridge, immediately west of the town of Wolfville and east of the village of New Minas. It is also bordered on the north by the south bank of the Cornwallis River (also known as Chijekwtook), opposite the village of Port Williams.

== History ==
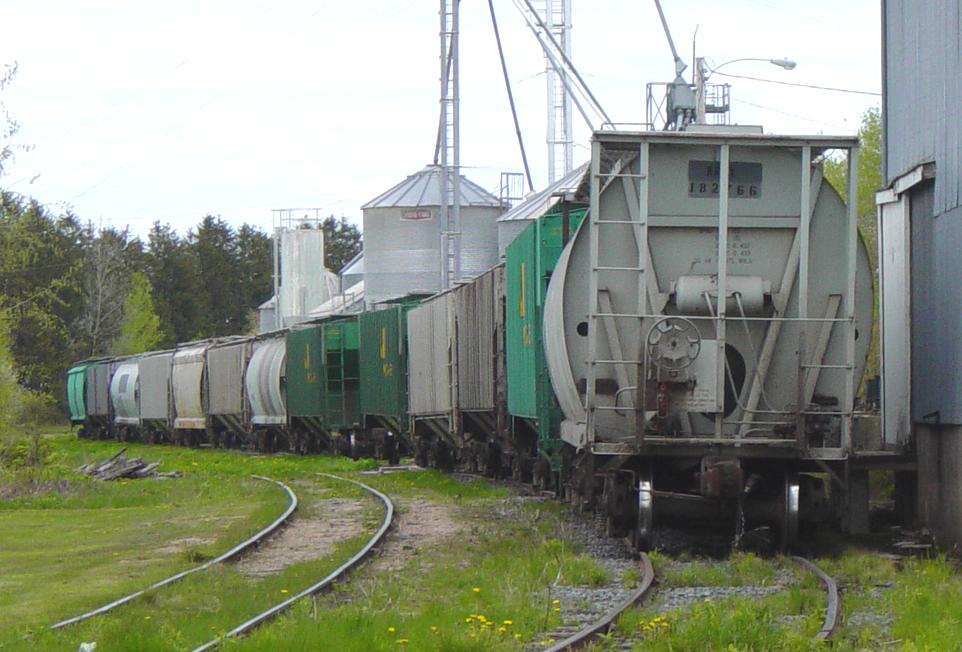
Railway cars at the feed mill in Greenwich in the last years of year service, 2005

Greenwich has been primarily agricultural in nature since being first settled by families including the Bishop and Forsyth families, who settled here in 1760 as New England Planters; both of these families still farm in Greenwich today. The Windsor and Annapolis Railway arrived in 1869. Greenwich served as the station for nearby Port Williams. In 1884, the first apple warehouse in Nova Scotia was built in Greenwich beside the station, quickly followed by many others in the 1890s paving the way for a rapid growth in the apple industry in Nova Scotia. Rail service lasted until 2006 and attracted bulk distributors for feed and fuel.

== Economy and services ==
Greenwich has a population of approximately 300 people. Agriculture remains an important industry but water, sewer, hydrant, street-lights, bus transit and sidewalk services have attracted residential and retail growth within easy access of both New Minas and Wolfville. Greenwich is also served by a volunteer fire department. The community has hosted Horton High School in two different locations since 1959.

== Greenwich United Church (now Bishop Hall) ==
In 1906, Andrew R. Cobb designed the plans for a new building to replace the original Methodist meeting house from 1833. The new building was completed in 1910 and the old meeting house was demolished. In 1923 it became the United Church of Greenwich and was part of the United Church of Canada. In 2012, the congregation amalgamated with congregations of several surrounding communities to form the Orchard Valley United Church. The Greenwich church building was sold to Noggins Corner Farm and has been renamed Bishop Hall. It currently functions as a space for community gatherings.
