= Cape d'Or =

Headland in Nova Scotia, Canada

Cape D'Or Lighthouse Cape d'Or Lighthouse
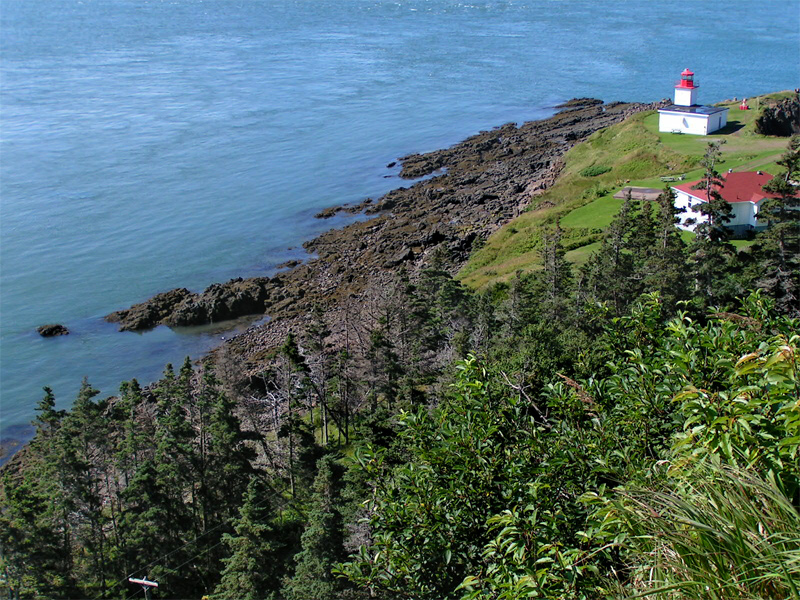
- Cape d'Or Lighthouse
- Location: Cape d'Or; Advocate; Nova Scotia; Canada
- Coordinates: 45°17′27.2″N 64°46′27.23″W

Tower
- Constructed: 1874 (fog horn station); 1922 (first)
- Construction: concrete tower
- Height: 9 metres (30 ft)
- Shape: quadrangular tower with balcony and lantern attached at one corner fog signal building
- Markings: white tower, red lantern
- Power source: mains electricity
- Operator: Lighthouse at Cape d'Or
- Fog signal: 3 blasts every 60s.

Light
- First lit: 1965 (current)
- Focal height: 24 metres (79 ft)
- Range: 13 nmi (24 km; 15 mi)
- Characteristic: Fl W 6s.

Cape d'Or is a headland located near Advocate, Cumberland County, on the Bay of Fundy coast of the Canadian province of Nova Scotia.

The cape marks the north point of the entrance to the Minas Basin. Cape d'Or is a continuation of the North Mountain tholeiitic basalt formation, and is marked by dramatic 200 m (660 ft) cliffs on its western side and 30 m (98 ft) cliffs on its southern side overlooking treacherous tidal currents in the Minas Channel. A basalt reef extends from the Cape into the Bay of Fundy where it intersects the violent waters of the Dory Rips, a rip tide created by the collision of three strong tidal currents.

== History ==
Cape d'Or was called L'mu'juiktuk by the Mi'kmaq, the native people of Nova Scotia. The cape was a centre of tool production and trade for the Mi'kmaq because of veins of hard dense rock such as chert which could be shaped to form sharp edges for tools and weapons. The Mi'kmaq also obtained copper from deposits in the basalt. An archaeological excavation near the lighthouses in 1980 found extensive native artifacts dated to about 2000 years ago.

The Cape was named by French explorers (Cape of Gold) because bright native copper deposits appeared golden. Samuel de Champlain explored the copper deposits at Cape d'Or in 1607 and bestowed the name Port of Mines on nearby Advocate Harbour to reflect the seams of copper ore at Cape d'Or. The French did not establish a mine at Cape d'Or as the massive cliffs and tides made the copper seams difficult to access but the name "Les Mines" became associated with the upper Bay of Fundy beyond Cape d'Or which became known as the "Baie des Mines", later Minas Basin, and the Acadian communities around the southern shore of the Minas Basin which became known as Les Mines.

Mineral rights at Cape d'Or were later granted to the Duke of Chandos but he was unable to establish a mine. However, in 1897 the Colonial Copper Company began a mine at Cape d'Or. Based out of New York and headed by J. A. Hanway, the company invested several million dollars in developing the site which went into operation in 1900. Three shafts were sunk along the cliff line and an ore processor was built. The shafts were connected to the processor and a shipping terminal at nearby Horseshoe Cove by a short narrow-gauge railway. A small company town was built with worker and manager houses. However, by 1905 the mine stopped excavation when the copper veins proved disappointing yields as they were excavated. The site was abandoned in 1907. The houses were shipped by sea to communities around the Bay of Fundy.

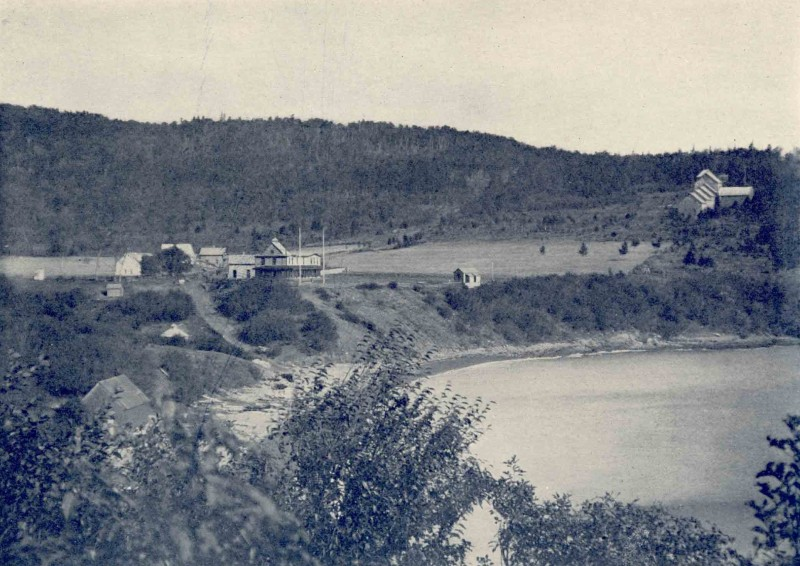
View of Horseshoe Cove circa 1905. The concentrating plant is at upper right.

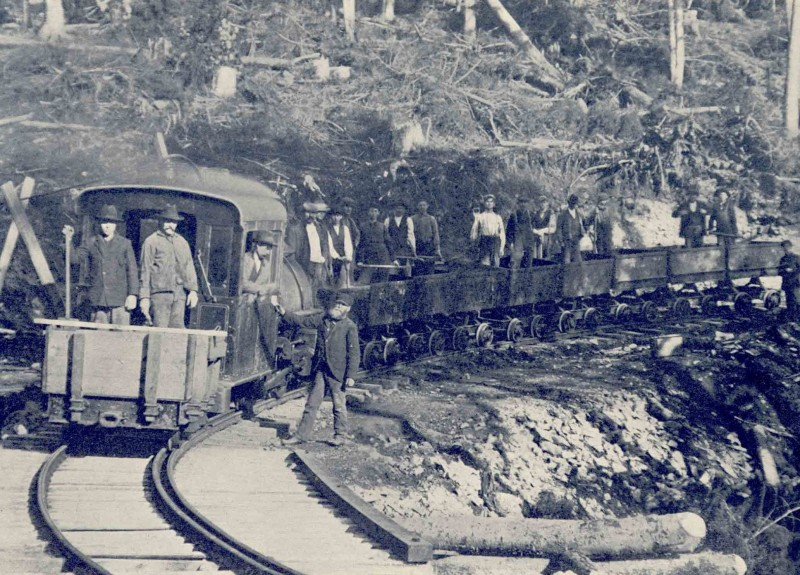
Miners for the Colonial Copper Company posing on the narrow gauge railway.

== Cape d'Or Lighthouse ==
A steam-powered foghorn was established at Cape d'Or in 1875. A square wooden lighthouse was added in 1922, re-using a lighthouse tower originally located at Apple River. Two new bungalows were built for the lightkeeper and the assistant lightkeeper in 1958 and a new concrete lighthouse was built in 1965. The last keeper was Ernie Morris who served until the light was de-staffed in 1989. The Advocate District Development Association obtained a lease through the County of Cumberland to preserve the site and its structures in 1995. The lightkeeper's houses were repaired. Today, one serves as the Lightkeeper's Kitchen restaurant and the other as a Guesthouse.

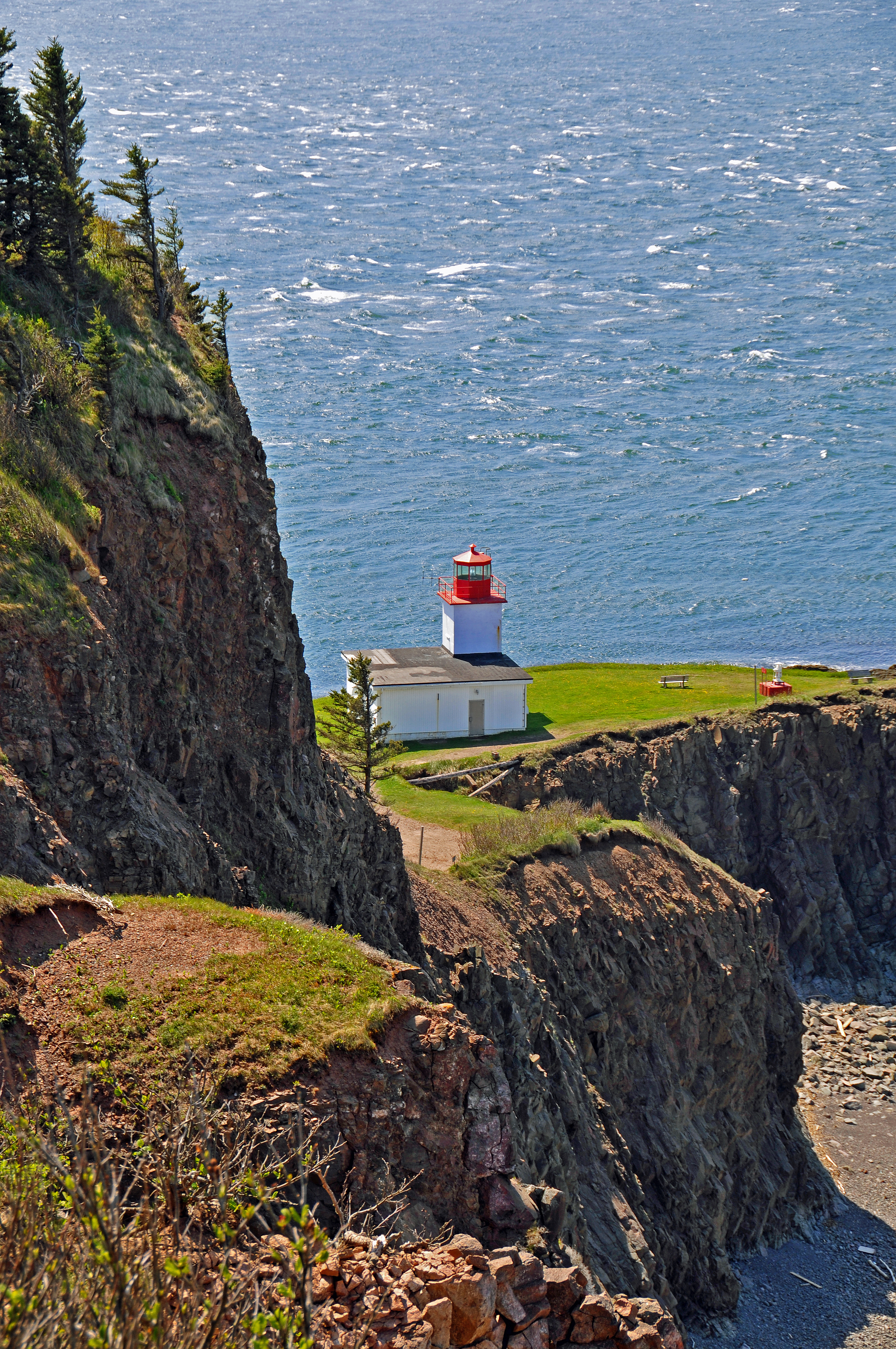
The lighthouse from the cliffs.

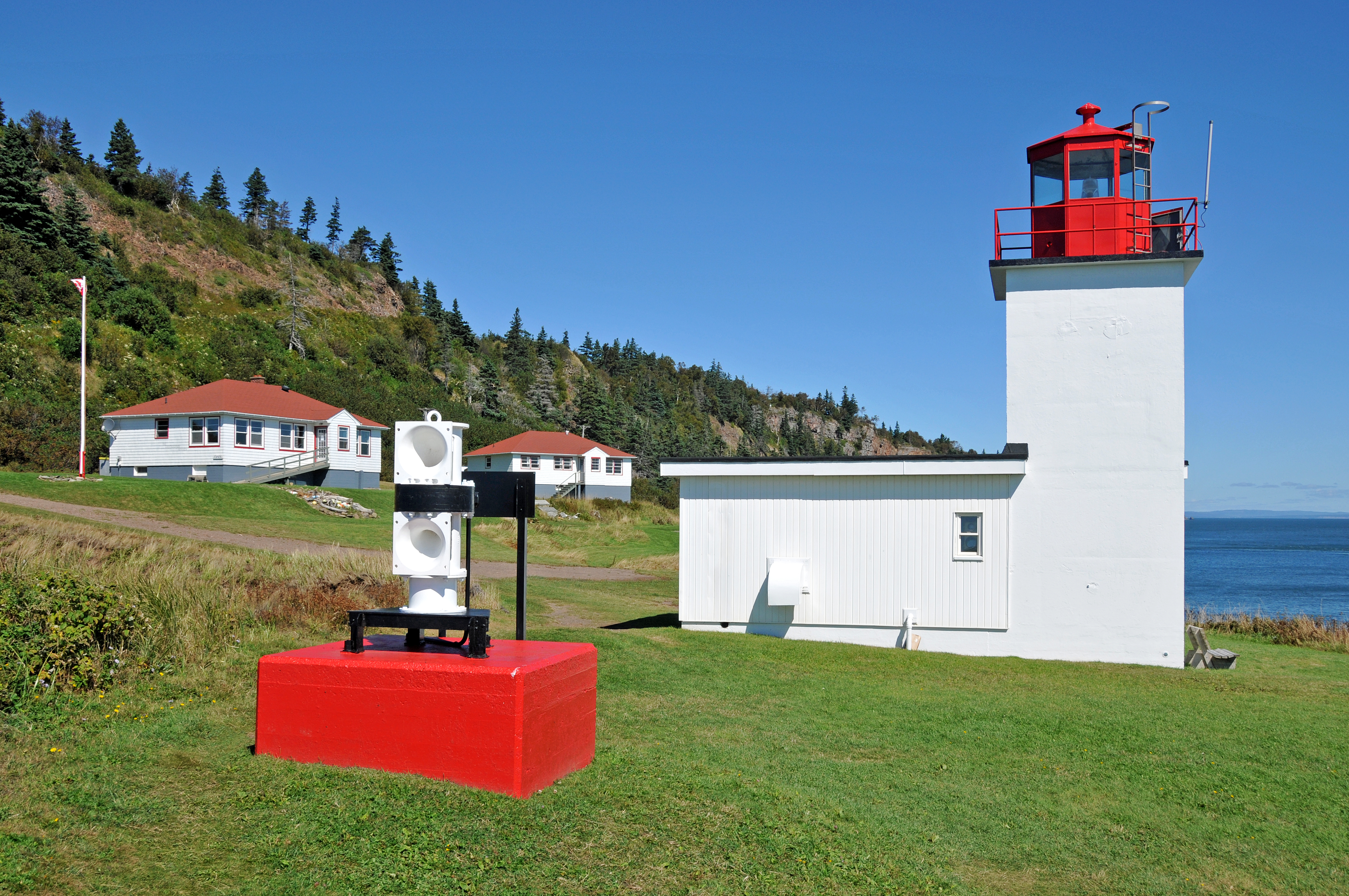
Lighthouse, foghorn and keeper's dwellings.

== Scenery ==
Most of the Cape is heavily forested, but the areas beside and above the lighthouse are cleared and grassy providing excellent long-distance views of the cliffs, sea stacks and tidal rips in good weather. The Cape's dramatic rocky landscapes have attracted many photographers including fashion photographers from Vogue Magazine who used Cape d'Or for a fashion shoot in 2015 featuring Karlie Kloss and Dylan Brosnan.

== Natural history ==
The basalt rock that comprises Cape d'Or contains many minerals including copper, cuprite, calcite, apophyllite and many zeolite minerals including stilbite, analcime, chabazite, mesolite, thomsonite, and others. The minerals form in isolated vugs, veins, and breccias and are often beautifully crystallized. The forest is mixed hardwood and softwood with many plants that favor the coastal environment.

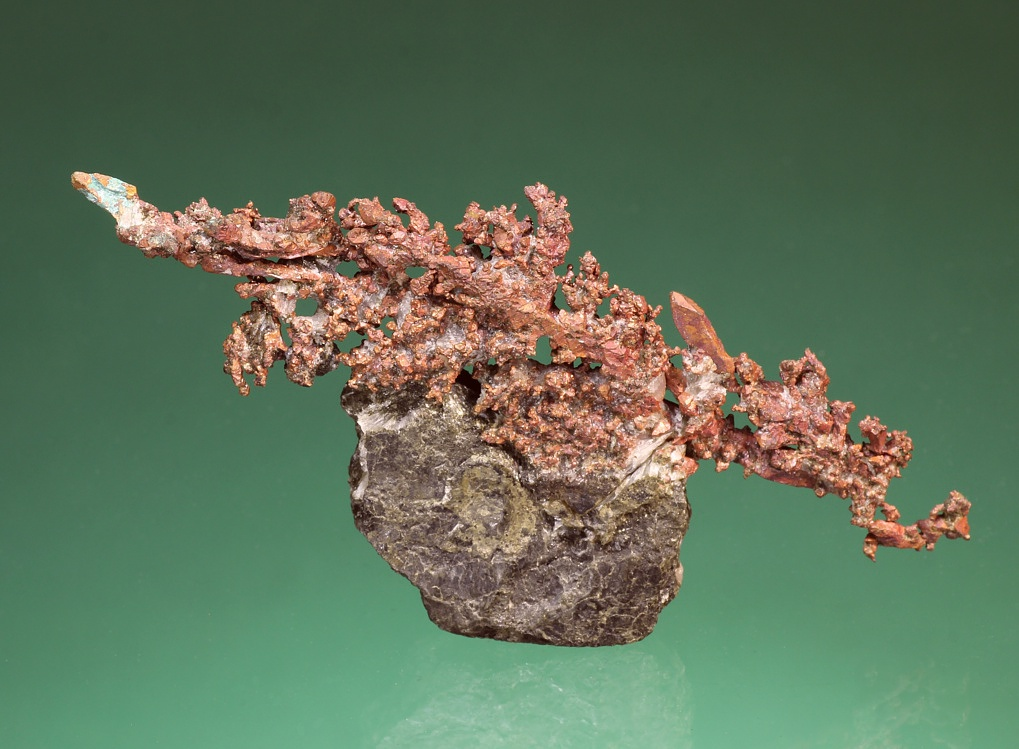
Native copper crystals on basalt, from Cape d'Or.

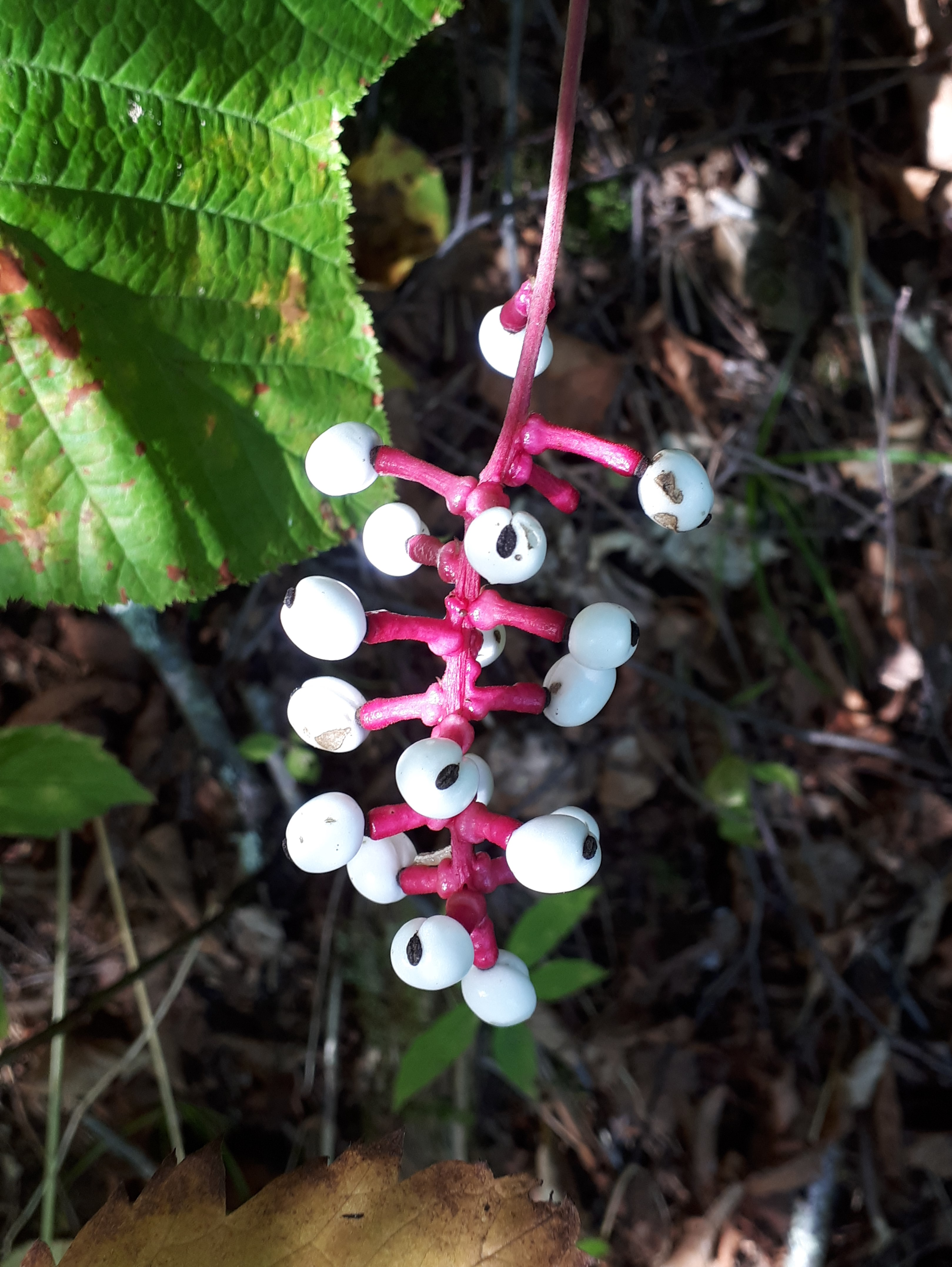
Fruit of the white baneberry plant, Cape d'Or.

== See also ==
- Dory Rips
- Volcanology of Canada
- Volcanology of Eastern Canada
- List of lighthouses in Canada
