= Advocate Harbour =

Community in Nova Scotia, Canada

Advocate
- Advocate Harbour
- Location of Advocate Harbour in Nova Scotia
- Coordinates: 45°20′10″N 64°46′55″W
- Country: Canada
- Province: Nova Scotia
- County: Cumberland
- Electoral Districts Federal: Cumberland-Colchester
- Provincial: Cumberland South

Government
  - MP: Stephen Ellis (Conservative Party of Canada)
  - MLA: Tory Rushton (Progressive Conservative Party)

Area
  - Total: 27.20 km^{2} (10.50 sq mi)
- Highest elevation: 159 m (522 ft)
- Lowest elevation: 0 m (0 ft)

Population (2011)
  - Total: 826
- Time zone: UTC-4 (Atlantic Standard Time)
- Postal code: BOM 1A0
- Area code: 902

Advocate Harbour (2011 pop.: 826) is a rural community located in Cumberland County, Nova Scotia, Canada.

The community is situated on Route 209 and has a small well-protected fishing harbour opening on the Bay of Fundy; the harbour dries at low tide.

The community's economy is tied to the seasonal industries of fishing and tourism. The scenic Cape d'Or Lighthouse and Cape Chignecto Provincial Park attract tourists and hikers. Due to the extreme tidal range in this area it is also a well-known sea kayaking destination. The coastal erosion creates sea stacks, caves and arches, and a long rocky beach with large amounts of driftwood is popular with beachcombers. The community is featured on the Fundy Shore Ecotour.

Low-lying parts of the community are protected by a seawall which was damaged by a storm in 2008. Some residents are prepared for 72 hours of isolation in the event of a storm that breaches the seawall, with supplies of food and bottled water. As of 2012, the seawall has been repaired and reinforced by construction crews. The reinforcements of the seawall are several piles of very large boulders within tidal range, and the seawall itself is reinforced with medium-sized boulders of the same nature.

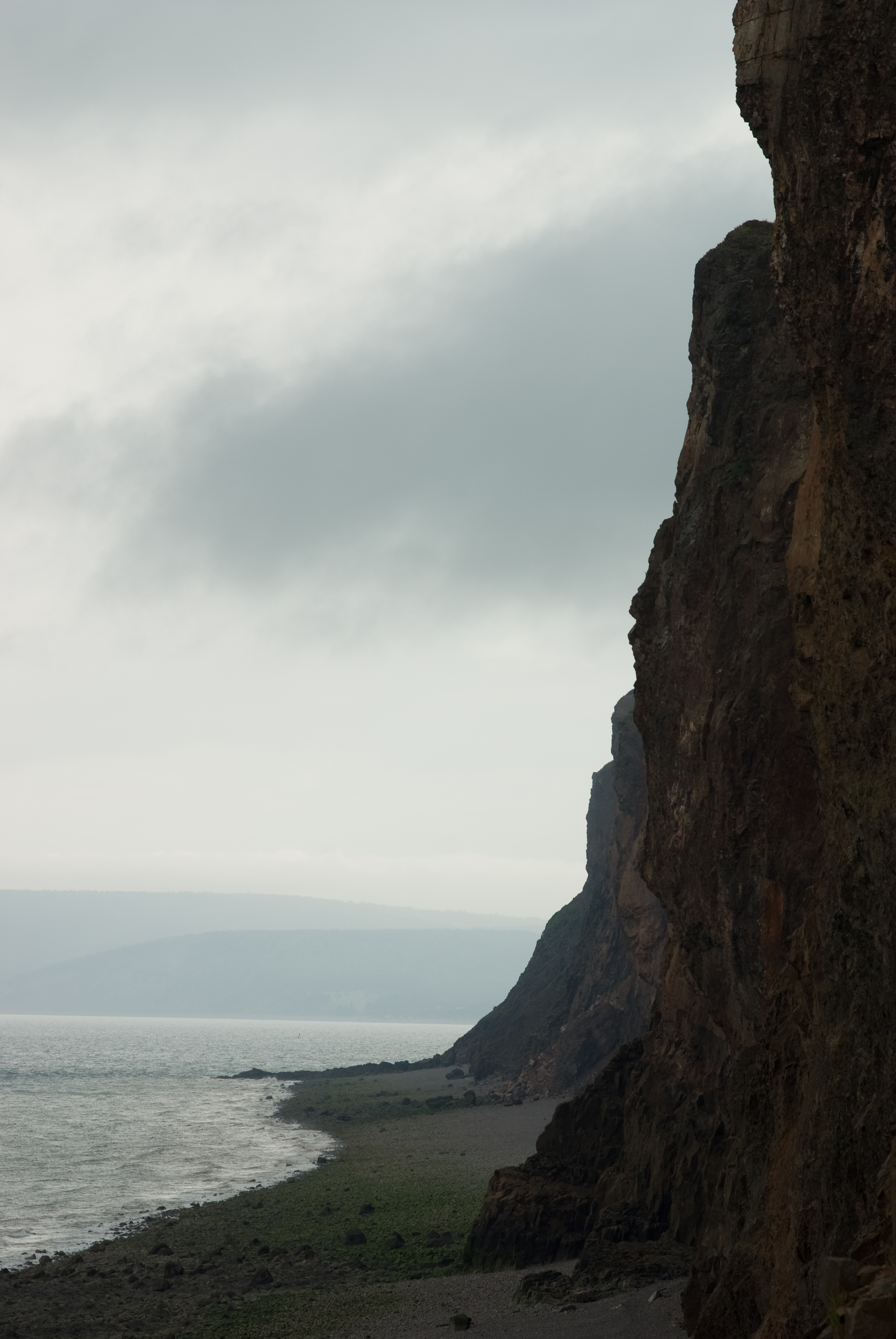
Cliffs of Cape Chignecto, Cape Chignecto Provincial Park, by Advocate Harbour along the Bay of Fundy in Nova Scotia

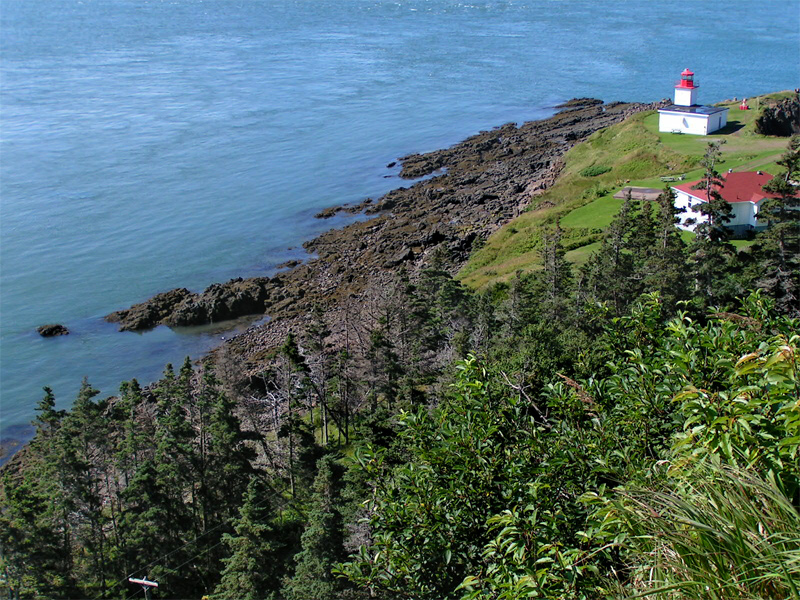
Cape d'Or Lighthouse near Advocate Harbour, Nova Scotia

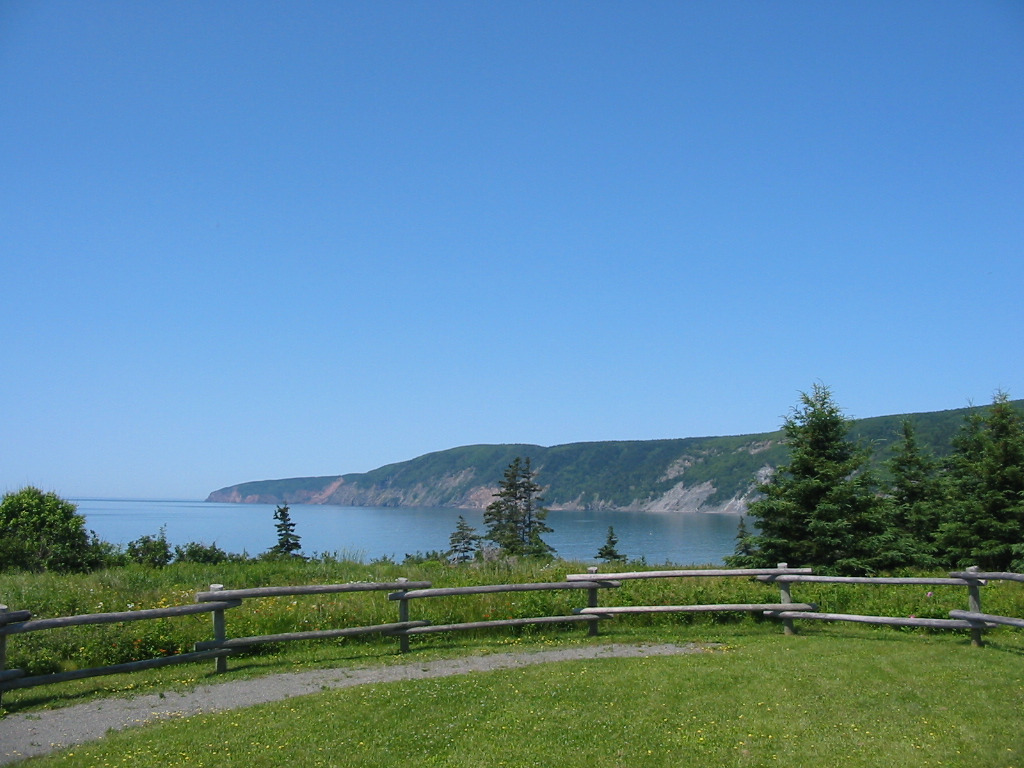
Cliffs of Cape Chignecto, taken from the entrance to Cape Chignecto Provincial Park, Advocate Harbour, Nova Scotia, Canada
