= Minas Basin =

Inlet in the Bay of Fundy, Nova Scotia, Canada

- French: Bassin des Mines
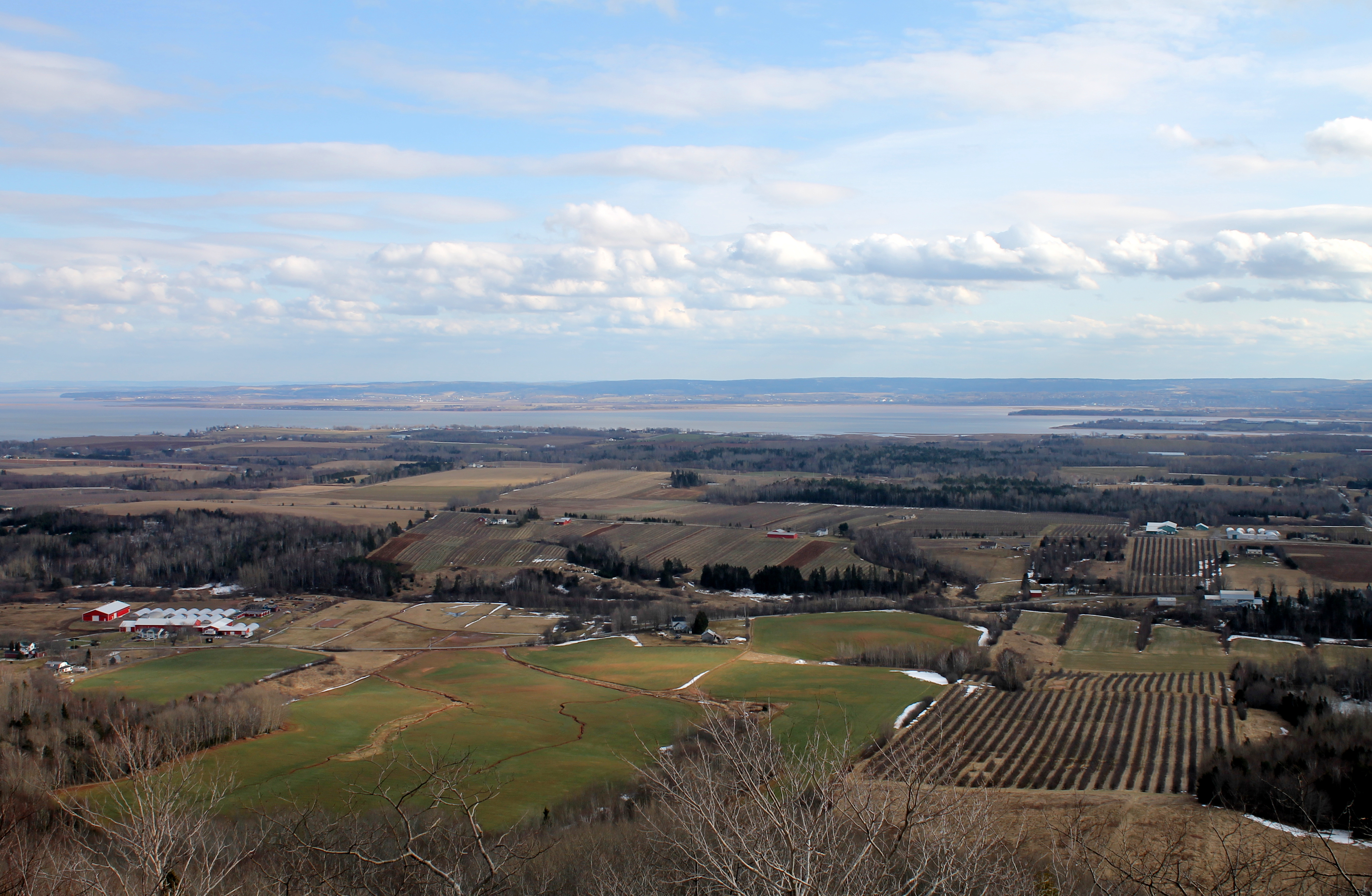
- Looking east across the Southern Bight of Minas Basin from The Lookoff

- Location within Nova Scotia
- Location: Nova Scotia
- Coordinates: 45°15′N 64°10′W
- Type: Inlet
- Part of: Bay of Fundy
- Settlements: Truro, Wolfville, Parrsboro

Ramsar Wetland
- Official name: Southern Bight-Minas Basin
- Designated: 5 November 1987
- Reference no.: 379

The Minas Basin (French: Bassin des Mines) is an inlet of the Bay of Fundy and a sub-basin of the Fundy Basin located in Nova Scotia, Canada. It is known for its extremely high tides.

== Geography ==
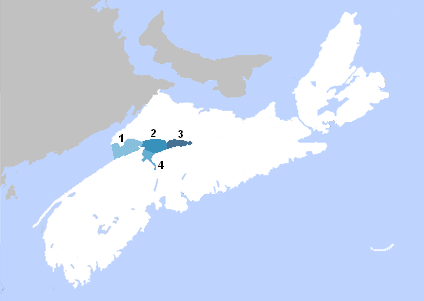
Map showing: (1) Minas Channel, (2) Central Minas Basin, (3) Cobequid Bay, (4) Southern Bight

The Minas Basin forms the eastern part of the Bay of Fundy which splits at Cape Chignecto and is delineated by the massive basalt headlands of Cape Split and Cape d'Or. The Minas Basin is divided into four sections: (1) the Minas Channel, from the shortest line between Cape Chignecto and the Annapolis Valley Shore to Minas Passage, between Parrsboro and Cape Blomidon; (2) Central Minas Basin, from Minas Passage to the mouth of Cobequid Bay, the shortest line point between Economy and the Noel Shore; (3) Cobequid Bay which extends to the mouth of the Salmon River; and (4) the Southern Bight, from the mouth of the Avon River to the shortest line between Cape Blomidon and the Noel Shore.

Several large rivers drain into the Minas Basin: the Shubenacadie River, Cornwallis River, Avon River, Gaspereau River, and Salmon River. Lesser rivers include the Canard River, Diligent River, Farrell River, and the Debert River. Along the northern edge of the Minas Basin lies a chain of intermittent high-cliffed basaltic bluffs and islands called the Basalt Headlands.

On the northern shore of the Minas Basin, around the Gaspereau River, and around the Salmon River, extensive areas of farmland have been created using dykes with sluices (one-way flow control valves), a form of polderisation.

=== Tides ===
Burntcoat Head, located on the "Noel Shore" along the south side of the Minas Basin, is the location of the highest tidal range ever recorded, exceeding 16-metre (52 ft) (during a spring tide only) and has one of the highest average tidal ranges every day. The waters of Minas Bay exchange with the main part of the Bay of Fundy through the Minas Channel which flows between Cape Split and Cape Sharp, creating extremely strong tidal currents. Near Cape d'Or, the turbulent collision of currents is known as the Dory Rips. The water in Minas Basin is a dense and nearly opaque reddish brown due to large amounts of suspended silt which are continually churned by tidal currents. At mid-tide, the currents exceed 8 knots (4-metre (13 ft) per second), and the flow in the deep, 5-kilometre (3.1 mi) -wide channel on the north side of Cape Split equals the combined flow of all the rivers and streams on Earth together (about 4-cubic-kilometre (0.96 mi^{3}) per hour).

== Communities ==
Several communities border the Minas Basin or the rivers that flow into it. The largest is the town of Truro which lies at the head of Cobequid Bay. Smaller centres include Parrsboro, Wolfville, Windsor and Maitland. Other communities include Great Village, Bass River, Five Islands, Economy, Walton, and Kingsport.

Historically, the north and southern sides of the basin were connected by a succession of ferries, which operated for more than 200 years, from Acadian times to 1941. The last ferry connected Parrsboro, Wolfville, and Kingsport and was called the MV Kipawo ferry, whose name was derived from the three communities.

=== Parks ===
Provincial parks at Anthony (near Truro), Five Islands, and Cape Blomidon allow visitors to enjoy and explore the Minas Basin. Community parks interpreting the Basin include the Kingsport waterfront and the Wolfville harbour park in Kings County; the Walton Lighthouse and Burntcoat Head Lighthouse in Hants County and the Lookout Tower in Economy and the Ottawa House Museum in Parrsboro in Cumberland County.

== History ==
=== Settlement ===
The Mi'kmaq were the first people to inhabit the area around the Minas Basin. Mi'kmaq tradition ties the god Glooscap in with significant geographical features such as Cape Blomidon and Five Islands.

Portuguese explorers and traders arrived in the early 1500s.In the 1600s came the French among them were the French explorer Samuel de Champlain who explored the copper deposits at Cape d'Or at the entrance to the Basin in 1607. Champlain bestowed the name Port of Mines onto the nearby Advocate Harbour to reflect the seams of copper ore at Cape d'Or. While the French did not establish a mine, the name "Les Mines" became associated with the upper Bay of Fundy beyond Cape d'Or which became known as the "Baie des Mines"', later Anglicized to Minas Basin.

French Acadian settlements began in the late 1600s first with settlements around the southern shore of the Minas Basin which became known as Les Mines. The Acadians had a particularly significant impact on the area in that they reclaimed considerable farmland through the use of dykes and aboiteaux. They founded in the area Grand-Pré, Les Mines, Pisiguit, Cobequid, Rivière-aux-Canards, and Beaubassin. Even today their dyke systems—greatly expanded by later additions—are still used near Truro and Wolfville at Port Williams and Grand Pré. In 1755, the British forcibly expelled the over 12,000 Acadians from Grand Pré, Pisiguit, Cobequid, and Beaubassin, in what became known as the Grand Dérangement, or Great Expulsion.

== Demography ==
During the Acadian era, virtually all inhabitants lived in distributed clusters or villages, with no single place dominating. The area was administered from Port Royal, later Annapolis Royal. The following table shows the population of the region during the Acadian era:

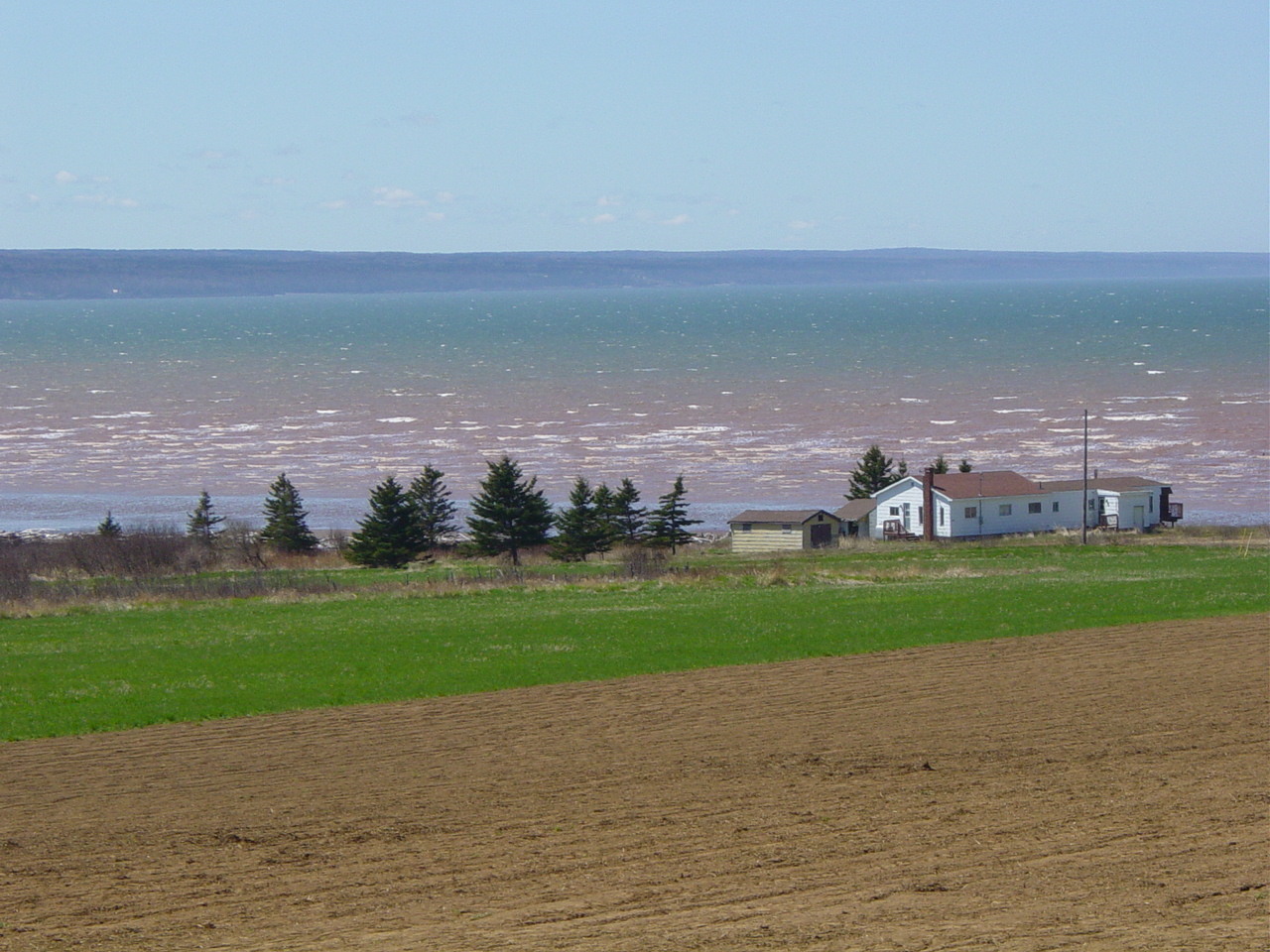
The Minas Basin in early May

Population of the Minas Basin
Year	Number of inhabitants
1671	?
1686	57
1693	305
1698	?
1701	487
1703	527
1707	677
1714	1,031
1730	2,500
1737	3,736
1748	5,000

The vacant Acadian settlements around the Minas Basin were succeeded by the New England Planters who arrived in 1760 and were later joined by Loyalists settlers in the 1780s. The Planters maintained operation of the ferry, rebuilt and expanded the Acadian dyke systems, and reclaimed more farmland from the Basin through projects like the Wellington Dyke in 1816.

== Industry ==
The communities around the Minas Basin were sustained by fishing, logging, farming, mining, boat building and shipbuilding. In the late 19th Century the Basin's shipyards produced some of the highest numbers of wooden ships in Canadian history and some of the largest, including the ship William D. Lawrence, the largest wooden ship built in Canada along with the giant barques Kings County, Canada's largest four masted-barque and Hamburg, Canada's largest three-masted barque. The tidal water also provided a means of transporting commodities such as lumber, apples and gypsum and powered Tide mills at locations such as Canning, Hantsport and Walton.

Mining included gypsum (several locations including Windsor and Cheverie), iron (Londonderry), barite (near Walton and the Eureka Mine at Five Islands), manganese (several locations including Cheverie and Tennycape), and copper (the Colonial Copper Company at Cape d'Or). Gypsum was shipped from Hantsport until 2009.

There have been attempts to generate energy from the rough waters of Minas Basin. However, the attempts were not successful.

== Nature ==
Marine mammals include seals and porpoises. Fish include bass, shad, and flounder; lobster, crab, mussel, and clam are common. Many types of seaweed, sponges, worms, seajellys and more are also found. Birds include sandpipers, terns (visitors only), eagles, falcons, seagulls, herons, and kingfishers.

Fossils are found near Parrsboro, Blue Beach and other areas along the Avon River. Rarely, fossils have been found at Evangeline Beach, Burntcoat Head, and other locations. These fossils include various shells (brachiopods, molluscs), sponges, trees, fish, amphibians, reptiles, and dinosaurs. Trace fossils include vertebrate footprints, fish fin-tracks, invertebrate trackways (ex. scorpions at Blue Beach), raindrop imprints, and wave ripples. They range from the beginning of the Carboniferous to the Jurassic. They were deposited when the region was warm and tropical, later when it was covered by a shallow sea, and later still when it was a desert.

Minerals include a variety zeolites from the basalt cliffs at Cape Split, the area around Parrsboro, Five Islands and Cap D'Or. These include Nova Scotia's provincial mineral stilbite, as well as heulandite, analcime, chabazite, gmelinite, natrolite and thomsonite. Other minerals found in the basalts include calcite, magnetite, copper, and quartz (often as amethyst). Beautiful agate is also found. In the sedimentary rocks, gypsum is commonly found at Blomidon, Clarke Head, and near Windsor in both the colorless variety (selenite) and the fibrous variety (satin spar), the latter sometimes being bright orange. Other minerals from the sedimentary rocks include pyrite, calcite, barite, manganite, and pyrolusite. Small amounts of fluorite, celestite, howlite have also been found at Cheverie.
