= Glooscap (ship) =

Sailing ship built in 1891

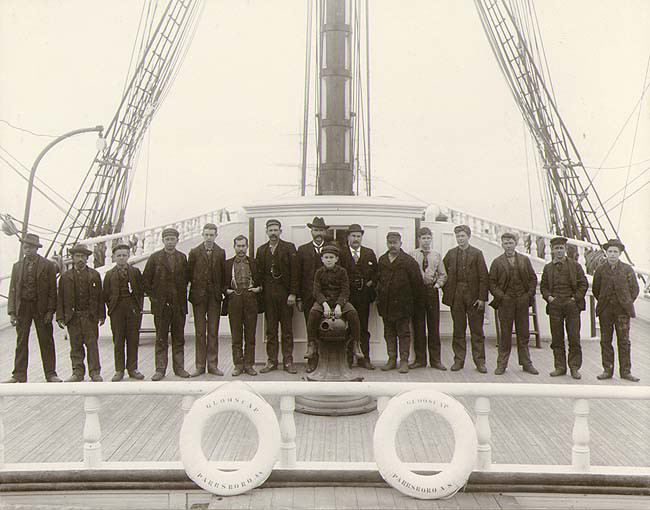

History

Canada
- Name: Glooscap
- Namesake: Glooscap, spiritual figure of the Mi'kmaq people
- Port of registry: Parrsboro, Nova Scotia
- Builder: Spencers Island Company, Spencer's Island, Nova Scotia
- Launched: August 5, 1891
- Identification: Code Letters JCNL
- Fate: Converted to Gypsum barge 1914
- Notes: Official Number 100108

General characteristics
- Tonnage: 1721 gross tons
- Length: 238 ft (73 m)
- Beam: 42.9 ft (13.1 m)
- Depth: 23.9 ft
- Decks: 2
- Propulsion: Sail
- Sail plan: Full-rigged ship
- Notes: Specifications from Glooscap 1914 Registry Form

Glooscap was a full-rigged sailing ship built in 1891 at Spencer's Island, Nova Scotia in the Minas Basin of the Bay of Fundy. The ship was named after Glooscap, the spiritual hero figure of the Mi'kmaq people. Glooscap was the culmination of several decades of large-scale ship building in the small village of Spencers Island. She was the last square rigger built along the Parrsboro Shore and the largest ship ever built in Cumberland County, Nova Scotia. She circled the world in her first year of operation, carrying freight to Liverpool, Cape Town, Australia, and New York City. She made frequent subsequent voyages to the Pacific. Although built in the twilight period of the Age of Sail, Glooscap earned good profits for her owners shipping freight around the world for two decades under the command of two noted captains, the brothers George T. Spicer and Dewis Spicer of Spencers Island. Glooscap was converted to a gypsum barge in 1914. The ship is featured in exhibits at the lighthouse museum in Spencer's Island and at the Age of Sail Heritage Centre in Port Greville.
