= Spencers Island =

Community in Nova Scotia, Canada

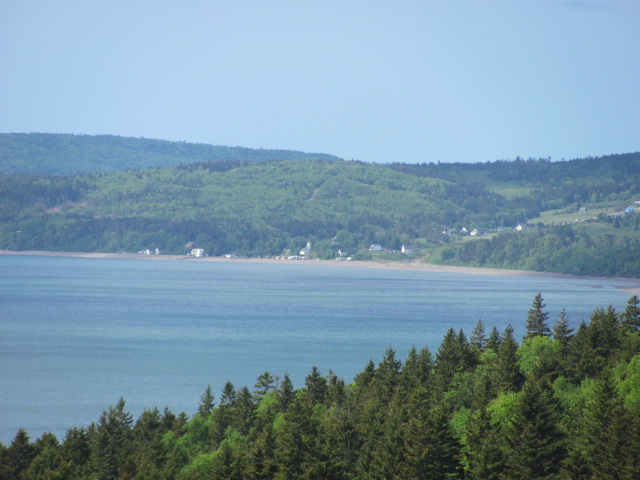

- Location of Spencers Island within Nova Scotia
- Coordinates: 45°20′59.90″N 64°44′8.65″W
- Country: Canada
- Province: Nova Scotia
- Municipality: Cumberland County
- Time zone: UTC-4 (AST)
- Postal code: B
- Area code: 902
- Telephone exchange: 392

Spencers Island is a rural community in Cumberland County, Nova Scotia, located at the western end of Greville Bay on the Bay of Fundy. The community is named after a small island 45°19′50″N 64°41′30″W of the same name located offshore from nearby Cape Spencer. According to local oral history, the island, cape and community trace their name to a man named Spencer who is buried on the island. However the name more likely comes from Lord Spencer, a British statesman at the time the community was settled.

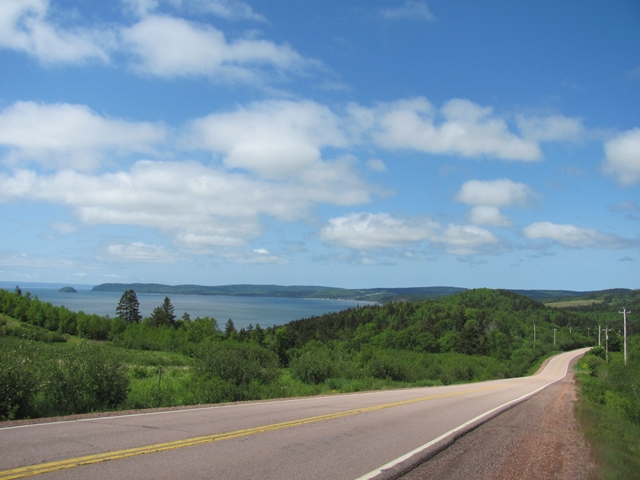
A view of Spencers Island from Fraserville showing the island and village

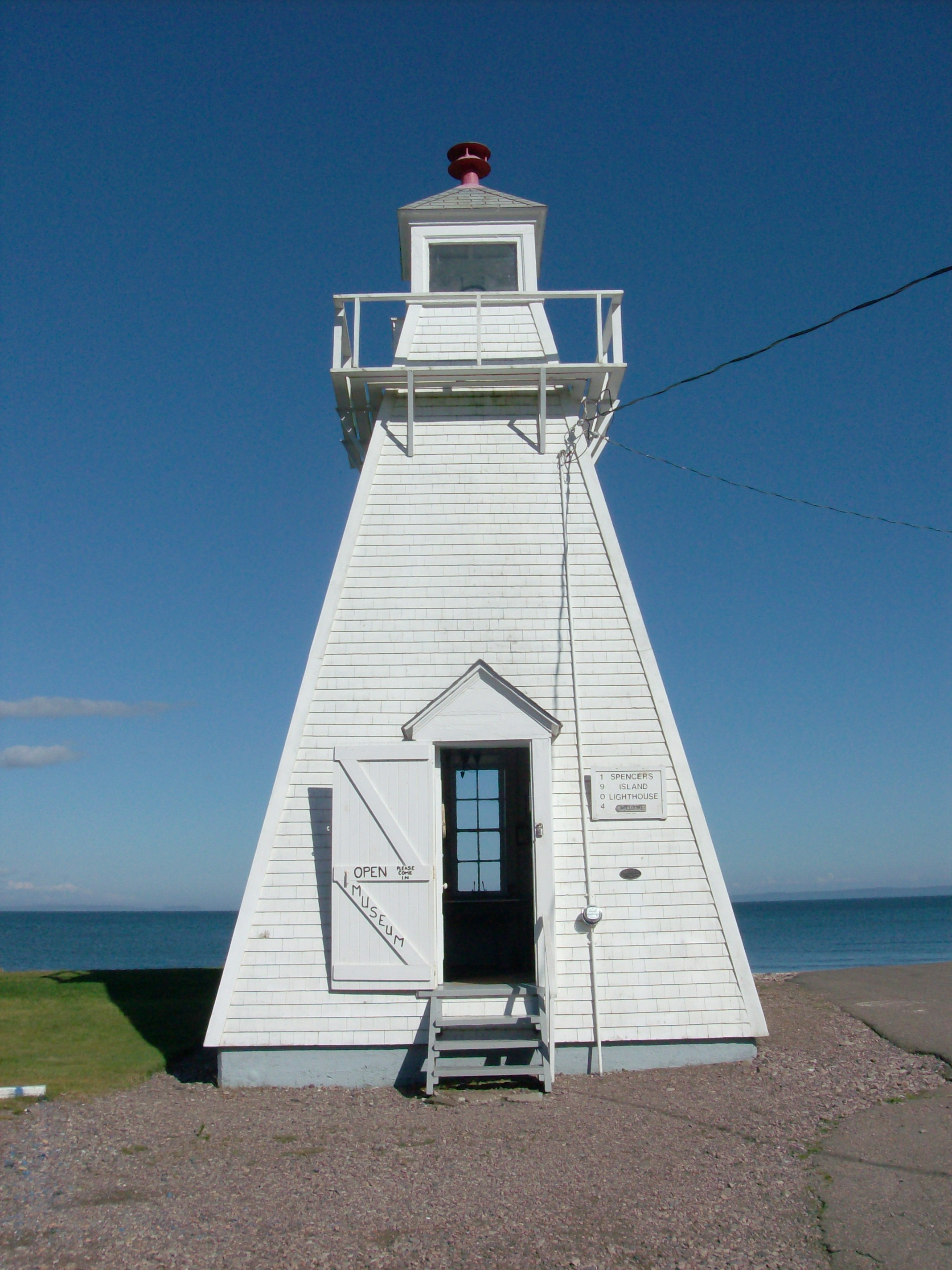
Spencers Island Lighthouse

Spencers Island was used seasonally by the Mi'kmaq who called it Wochuk, meaning small kettle island. The first recorded settlement was by the Spicer families in 1778. Spencers Island became an important shipbuilding centre during the latter days of the Age of Sail. The first large vessel from its shipyards was the Amazon built in 1861 and later to become famous as the Mary Celeste. Many larger vessels followed including the full-rigged ship Glooscap in 1891, the largest ship built in Cumberland County and the last square rigger built along the Parrsboro Shore. The former shipyard area is now part of the Old Shipyard Beach Campground.

The community is located at 45º21'16"N, 64º42'54"W, with the community of Advocate Harbour to the west and the community of Port Greville and village of Parrsboro to the east. It is located on Route 209 and one of the communities that form the Fundy Shore Ecotour.

The community of Spencers Island contains a historic lighthouse dating to 1904, a beach, campground and cafe. The lighthouse has recently been granted permission by the Canadian Coast Guard to turn the light back on, and is open to the public with pictures of the ship building and ship building artifacts on display. A plaque in the lighthouse recognizes Stanley Spicer, a noted local historian who helped save the lighthouses and wrote many books on the history and shipping of the Bay of Fundy. A picnic park is located beside the lighthouse and a public boat ramp has also been re-built for small craft to be launched from mid-tide to high tide. Public bathrooms are available from June to September.
