= Parrsboro Shore =

Coordinates: 45°24′N 64°38′W

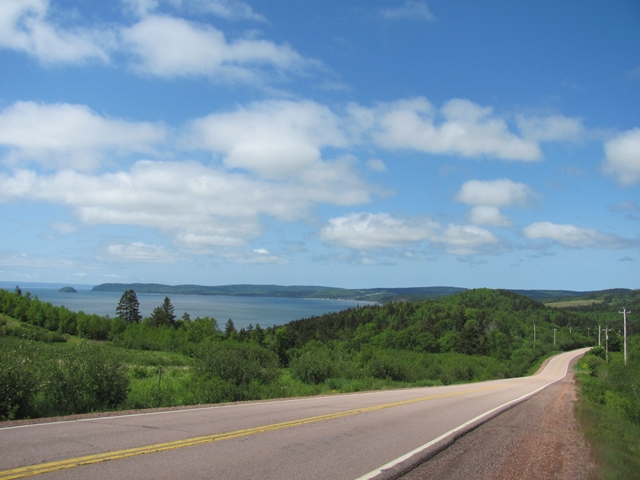
A view of the Parrsboro shore showing Spencers Island

The Parrsboro Shore is an area of Cumberland County, Nova Scotia consisting of the shoreline communities west of the town of Parrsboro. The Parrsboro Shore is generally defined as stretching along the Bay of Fundy from the town of Parrsboro westward around Cape Chignecto as far as Apple River. It includes the communities of Diligent River, Fox River, Port Greville, Ward's Brook, Fraserville, Spencer's Island, Advocate, the ghost town of Eatonville. Linked by Nova Scotia's Route 209, the communities form part of the Fundy Shore Ecotour.

The area is named because the communities form a hinterland for the town of Parrsboro. The Parrsboro Shore was once a major lumbering and shipbuilding centre producing 400 vessels. The area's history is preserved at the Age of Sail Heritage Centre in Port Greville and at the Parrsboro Shore Historical Society at Ottawa House in Parrsboro.
