= Fraserville =

Fraserville may refer to:

- Fraserville, Ontario, a community in Peterborough County, Ontario,
- Fraserville, Nova Scotia, a community in Cumberland County, Nova Scotia,
- a historical name for Rivière-du-Loup, Quebec.
