= West Bay, Cumberland County =

Community in Nova Scotia, Canada

West Bay
- West Bay, Cumberland County in Nova Scotia
- Coordinates: 45°24′N 64°21′W
- Country: Canada
- Province: Nova Scotia
- Municipality: Cumberland County
- Time zone: UTC-4 (AST)
- Postal code: B
- Area code: 902
- Telephone Exchange: 254

West Bay is a rural community in the Canadian province of Nova Scotia, located in Cumberland County.

It is situated on the north shore of the Minas Basin, west of Partridge Island, adjacent to the town of Parrsboro.
