= Farrells River =

River in Nova Scotia, Canada

Coordinates: 45°24′56.6″N 64°18′54.2″W

Farrells River in Nova Scotia

Farrells River, formerly known as Parrsboro River, is a small river that flows south into an aboiteau on Parrsboro Harbour on the Minas Basin near the town of Parrsboro, Nova Scotia.

Miꞌkmaq summer encampments bordered the river near the current Glooscap restaurant on a flat which is now blueberry fields with bee hives.

A story is told of a small plane flown by novice Air Force pilots that was forced to land in heavy fog in Parrsboro Bay. The local people, hearing the engines in trouble in the sky, lit fires along the Farrell River to indicate a landing strip on the ice at the mouth of the river. The young pilot landed the plane, but bounced, and it cleared the bridge, barely tipping telegraph wires and landing on the other side with no casualties.

== See also ==
- List of rivers of Nova Scotia
