= Eldon George =

Canadian geologist and fossil collector (1931–2018)

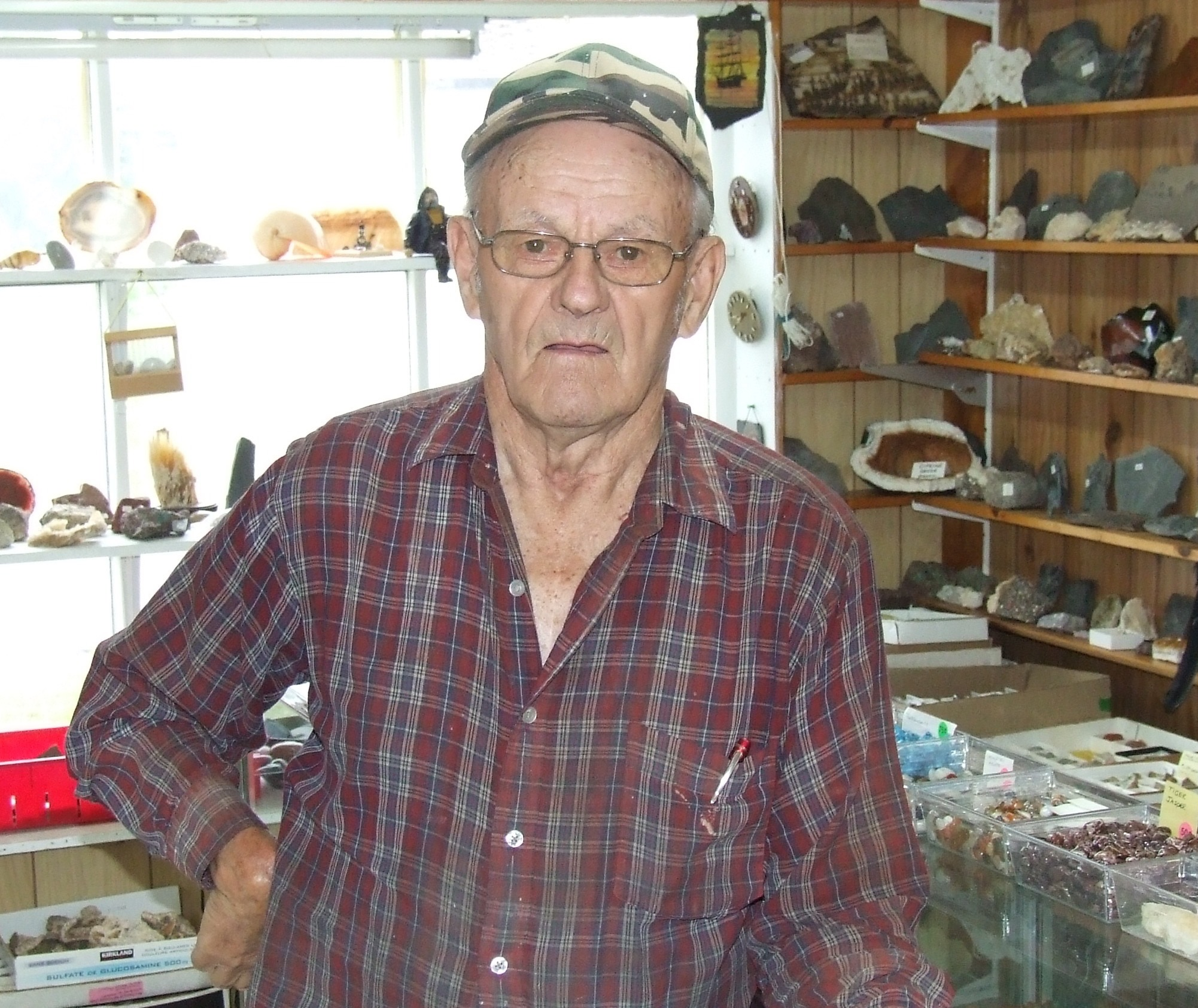
- George in 2013
- Born: May 10, 1931; Parrsboro, Nova Scotia, Canada
- Died: November 29, 2018 (aged 87)
- Occupation(s): Fossil collector Geologist

Eldon Thomas George ONS (May 10, 1931 – November 29, 2018) was a Canadian fossil collector and amateur geologist who made many significant discoveries on the shores of Minas Basin and the Bay of Fundy from the time that he began his fossil and mineral hunting career in the 1940s. George found the world's smallest dinosaur tracks in 1984 near Parrsboro, Nova Scotia, Canada. His other finds include a wide variety of fossilized amphibian and dinosaur prints that were displayed, along with the world's smallest dinosaur tracks, at his Parrsboro Rock and Mineral Shop and Museum. One of them is a 17-inch (43 cm) track that may have been a primitive, two-legged, crocodile-like creature that was nearly 20 feet (6.1 m) long. George's other discoveries include a fossilized insect with three pairs of wings and a tiny horseshoe crab that supplies a "missing link" in the area's natural history.

George's interest in mineralogy led him to become an influential advocate for stilbite as Nova Scotia's provincial mineral.

Over the decades, George's discoveries and stories have been featured or mentioned in a wide variety of publications including The Christian Science Monitor, The New York Times and National Geographic. He also appeared in the five-part CBC Television series Geologic Journey, narrated by David Suzuki.

== Life and work ==
George was born in Parrsboro, Nova Scotia, Canada in 1931. His career as an amateur geologist began after his right arm was fractured in a fall when he was nine. His injury healed poorly, leaving him unable to participate in sports with his peers, so he began exploring the beaches and cliffs near his home collecting rocks and semi-precious stones, and teaching himself gemology. He also began discovering a wide array of fossils.

In 1948, George opened his Rock and Mineral Shop and Museum in Parrsboro where he displayed his huge collection of mineral and fossil specimens until he sold his business and donated the collection in 2015 for a special display in Parrsboro's Fundy Geological Museum. In 1966, he helped organize the Rockhound Roundup, a yearly event that drew thousands of visitors to Parrsboro. Today, it has evolved into the annual Nova Scotia Gem and Mineral Show.

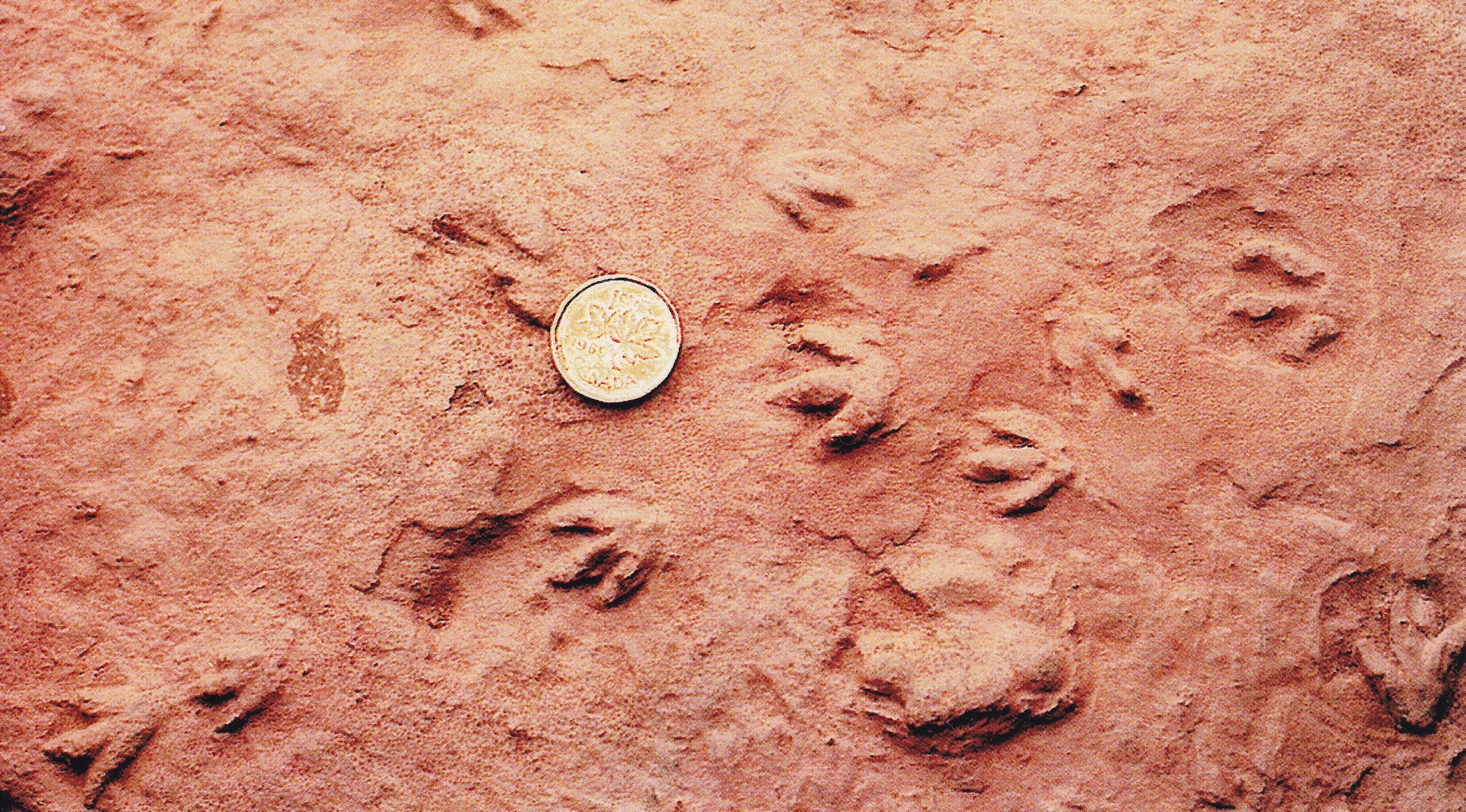
World's smallest dinosaur footprints

George's fossil discoveries altered scientific views. Until a few decades ago, most paleontologists did not see the Fundy shoreline as a rich source of fossils. George's many finds, along with those of paleontologist Paul E. Olsen, changed their opinions. On April 10, 1984, he made a discovery that drew the world's attention to Wasson Bluff, on the shores of the Minas Basin about eight kilometres (5 mi) from Parrsboro. While riding along the shoreline on his all-terrain vehicle (ATV), he picked out what appeared to be tiny tracks. Using a pocket knife, he gradually exposed five fossil trackways imprinted in a slab of sandstone measuring 16 × 14 inches (40 × 35 cm). At first, he thought the three-toed tracks had been made by a reptile, but Olsen identified them as dinosaur prints. The prints belonged to a theropod dinosaur about the size of a small bird, such as a sparrow or robin.

In 1986, a scientific team that included Paul Olsen, discovered hundreds of thousands of fossils at Wasson Bluff, one of the biggest troves ever found.

Fossil discoveries on the Fundy shoreline are especially significant because they date from 200 million years ago, the boundary between the Triassic and Jurassic geological periods, when about half of the Earth's living creatures suddenly became extinct giving rise to dinosaurs and the mammals that eventually succeeded them. Many of the fossils that date from that time remain hidden, buried under North American forests, farmland or cities. But, the Fundy tides constantly expose them in the cliffs that George had spent a lifetime exploring. "The tides here are like 20,000 bulldozers," he says, "excavating and changing the land every day."

George died on November 29, 2018, at the age of 87.

== Awards and honours ==
In 2013, George received the Order of Nova Scotia, the province's highest honour, for his fossil discoveries, for community leadership and for bringing the world's attention to Nova Scotia's geological heritage. The Order's summary of his achievements states: "His lifelong passion for fossil collecting and his rare finds have brought world experts to his doorstep."

The Atlantic Geoscience Society awarded Eldon George the Laing Ferguson - Distinguished Service Award in 2013. The award recognizes "exceptional and altruistic contributions to the Atlantic Geoscience Society" as well as those who "foster public appreciation of Atlantic Geoscience over a long period of time."

In 2014, George received a Tourism Champion award from the Tourism Industry Association of Nova Scotia.
