= Greville Bay =

Coordinates: 45°22′N 64°35′W

Greville Bay, Nova Scotia

Greville Bay is situated in northern Nova Scotia, Canada. It is attached to the Bay of Fundy and is often associated with Port Greville.

Nova Scotia–born, Juno Award–winning jazz saxophonist Mike Murley recorded a piece titled "Greville Bay" on his 1997 Jazz Report Awards Album of the Year Conversation Piece.
