= CICR-FM =

Community radio station in Parrsboro, Nova Scotia

- Parrsboro, Nova Scotia; Canada
- Frequency: 99.1 MHz
- Branding: Parrsboro Community Radio

Programming
- Format: Community radio

Ownership
- Owner: Parrsboro Radio Society

History
- First air date: September 2008

Technical information
- Class: LP
- ERP: 50 watts
- HAAT: 32 metres
- Transmitter coordinates: 45°24′32″N 64°19′36″W

Links
- Webcast: CICR Streaming Radio
- Website: Parrsboro Community Radio

CICR-FM, branded as Parrsboro Community Radio, is a Canadian community radio station operating in Parrsboro, Nova Scotia. CICR-FM broadcasts at 99.1 FM with an effective radiated power of 50 watts.

Owned by the Parrsboro Radio Society, the station was licensed on September 19, 2008 and began broadcasting in September 2008.
