= Age of Sail Heritage Centre =

Coordinates: 45°24′54.5″N 64°33′07.5″W

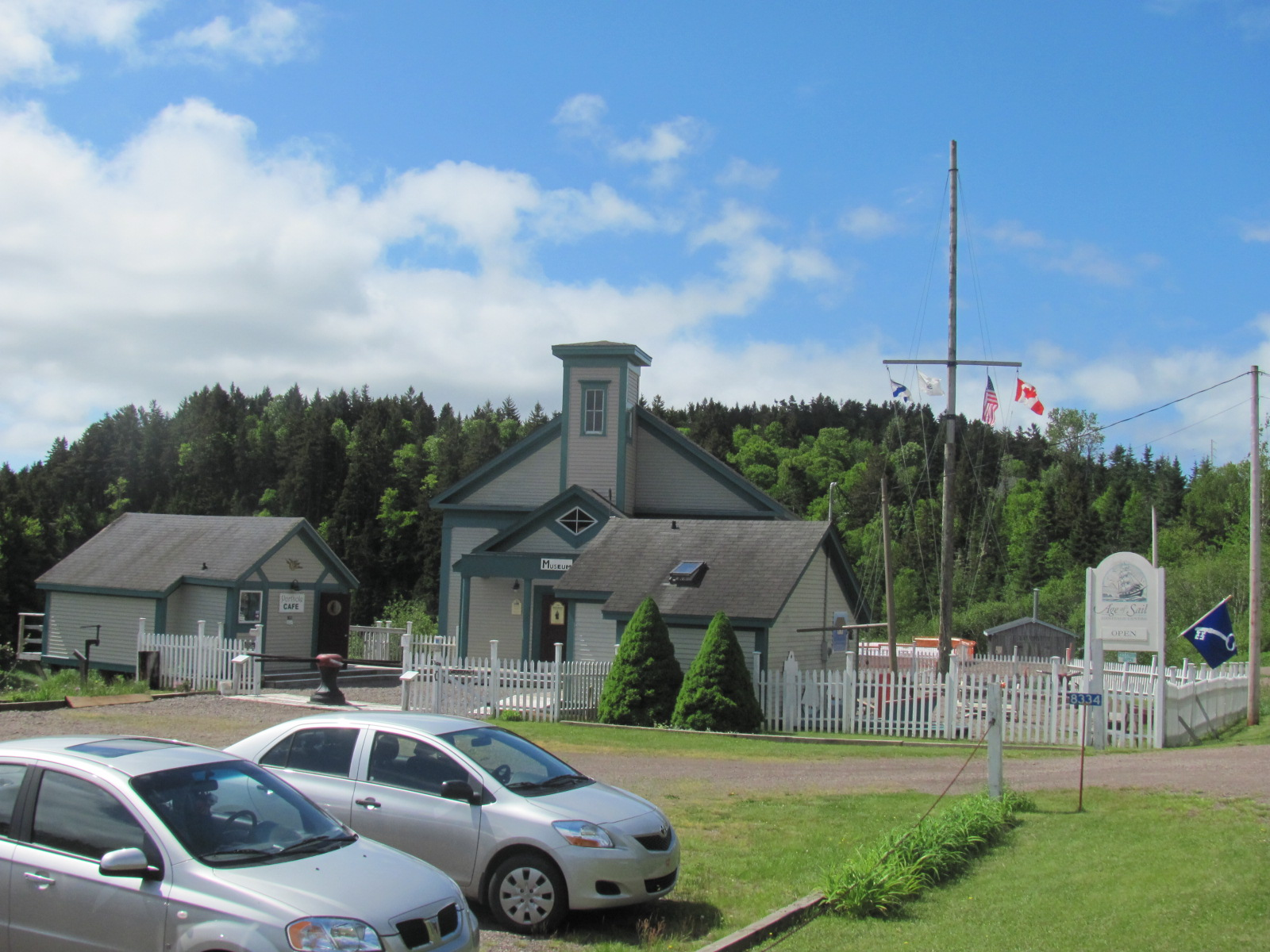
- Established: 1994
- Location: 8334 Route 209; Port Greville, Nova Scotia Canada
- Type: Community and Marine Museum
- Curator: Oralee O'Byrne
- Website: www.ageofsailmuseum.ca

The Age of Sail Heritage Centre (also known as the Age of Sail Heritage Museum) is a museum and heritage centre at Port Greville, Nova Scotia, Canada. It focuses on the history of Parrsboro Shore communities along the Minas Channel of the Bay of Fundy with an emphasis on the area's shipbuilding and lumbering heritage.

== The Site ==
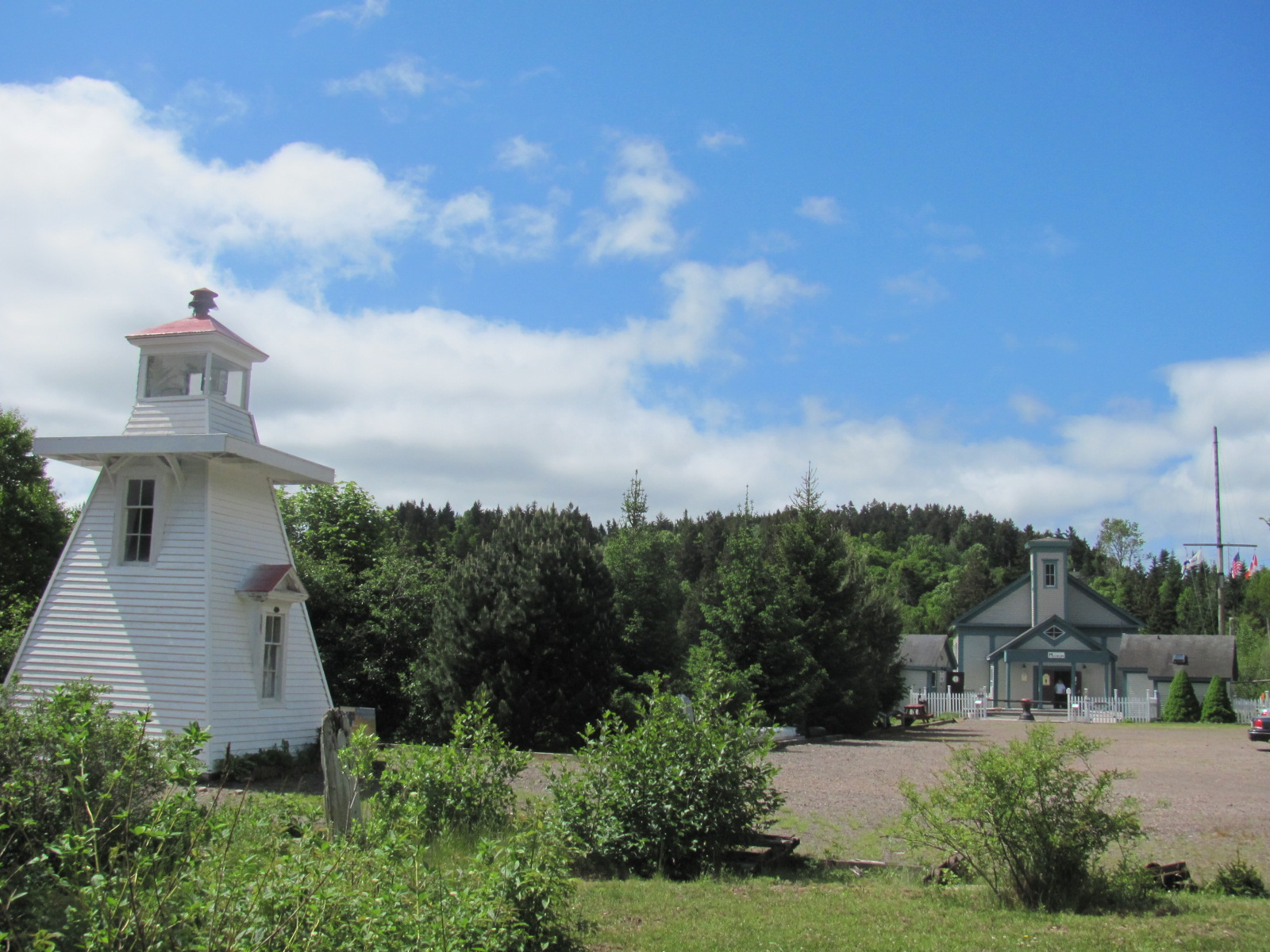
The Port Greville Lighthouse on the Grounds of the museum

The Museum consists of a number of historic buildings moved to a central site on the banks of a scenic ravine beside the tidal Greville River. The main building is a former 1854 Methodist Church. In addition to the original building the site is home to a cafe/gift shop, the Port Greville Lighthouse, a boat shed, a blacksmith shop and a band saw shed. Several walking trails lead from the museum to historic and natural features along the river.

== History ==
The heritage centre began with the Greville Bay Recreation and Development Group formed in 1981 to develop the Port Greville area. The group at first developed a picnic park on the old Red House Landing Site and worked on building and maintaining washrooms and a picnic area. In 1988 the chair of the group Ross Colins put forward the idea of a museum. In 1991, the Greville Bay Shipbuilding Museum Society was incorporated with the goal of protecting and preserving working heritage" with a "hands-on shipbuilding museum" focusing on the Parrsboro Shore's extensive lumbering and shipbuilding history.

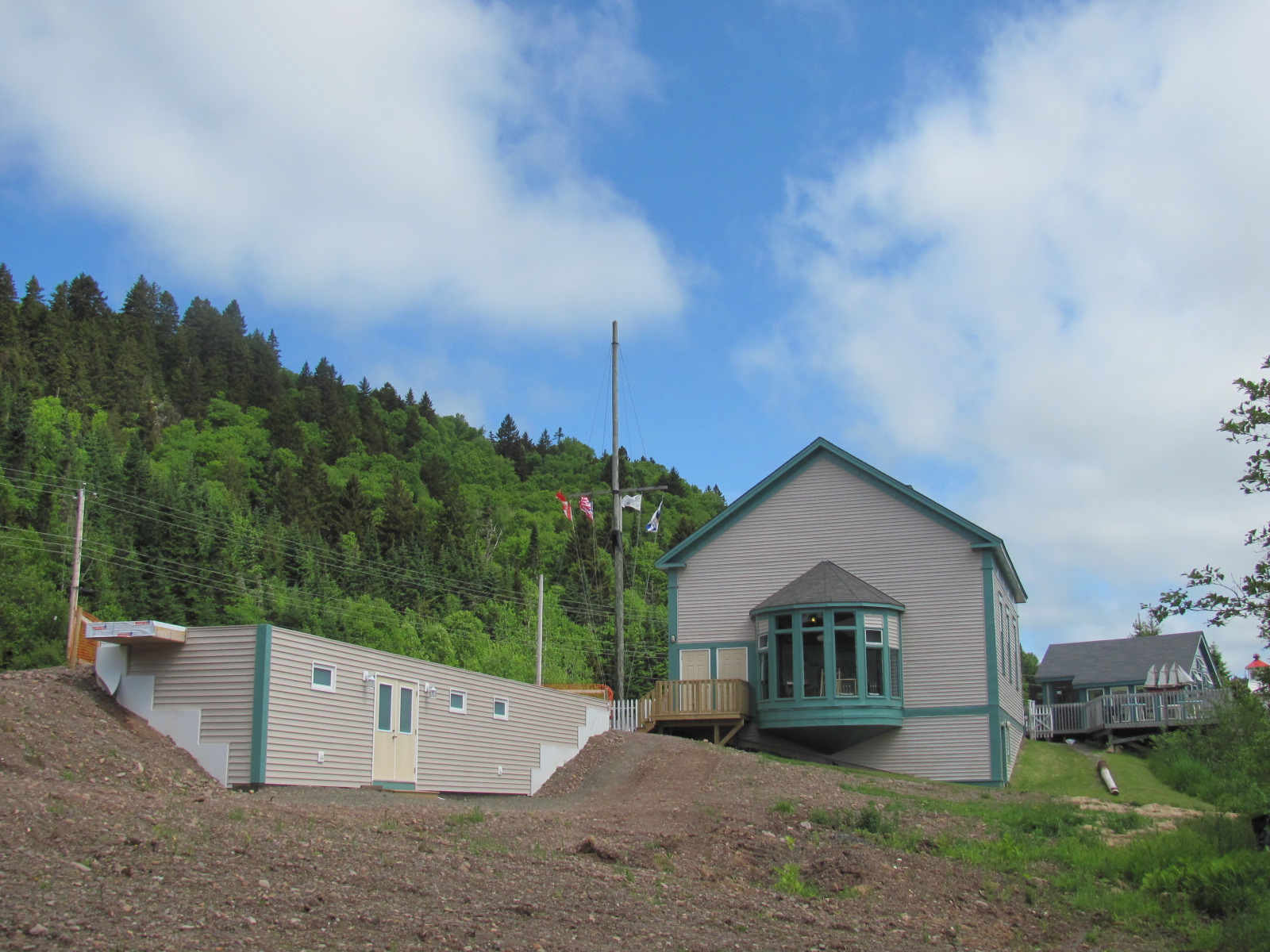
The 2011 expansion to the museum

Later that same year the committee took on the task of clearing and cleaning the site and erected an information building. In 1992 the McLeod family donated a building, formerly the Cochrane Hall and originally a Methodist church built in 1854. It was dismantled and moved 2 kilometres to the site where it sat for a year as funding was raised. In 1993, reconstruction began.

In 1994, the Age of Sail Heritage Centre Museum was opened to the public. After its first year the centre won a provincial architecture award for innovative design. An expansion is underway for 2011 to provide public events, research and conservation space.

The museum is staffed chiefly by volunteers with community support. A curator as well as 2 or 3 students are hired per season. Items in the collections number over 2,000 with everything from period fashion, to hand tool, models and equipment as well as numerous photographs and archives. The museum is one of the attractions of the Fundy Shore Ecotour.
