= Fraserville, Nova Scotia =

Community in Nova Scotia, Canada

Fraserville
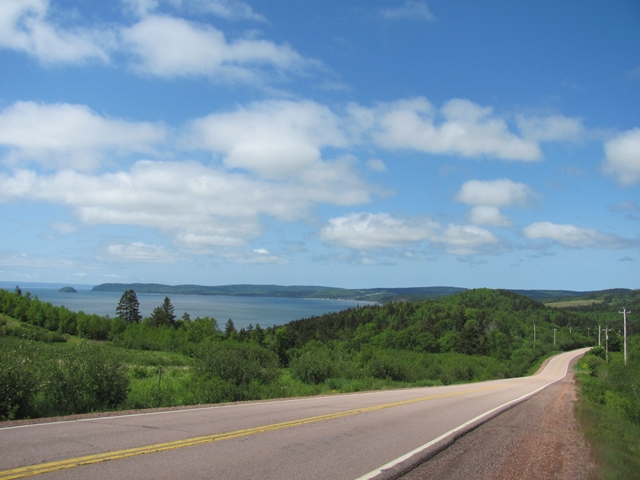
- A view from Fraserville showing Spencers Island

- Location within Nova Scotia
- Coordinates: 45°23′26″N 64°40′6″W
- Country: Canada
- Province: Nova Scotia
- Municipality: Cumberland County
- Time zone: UTC-4 (AST)
- Postal code: B
- Area code: 902
- Part of a series about Places in Nova Scotia

Fraserville is a rural community in the Canadian province of Nova Scotia, located in Cumberland County. It is located along Route 209 and one of the communities along the Fundy Shore Ecotour. It is adjacent to Spencer's Island to the west and East Fraserville to the east.
