= Wasson Bluff =

Cliff in Nova Scotia, Canada

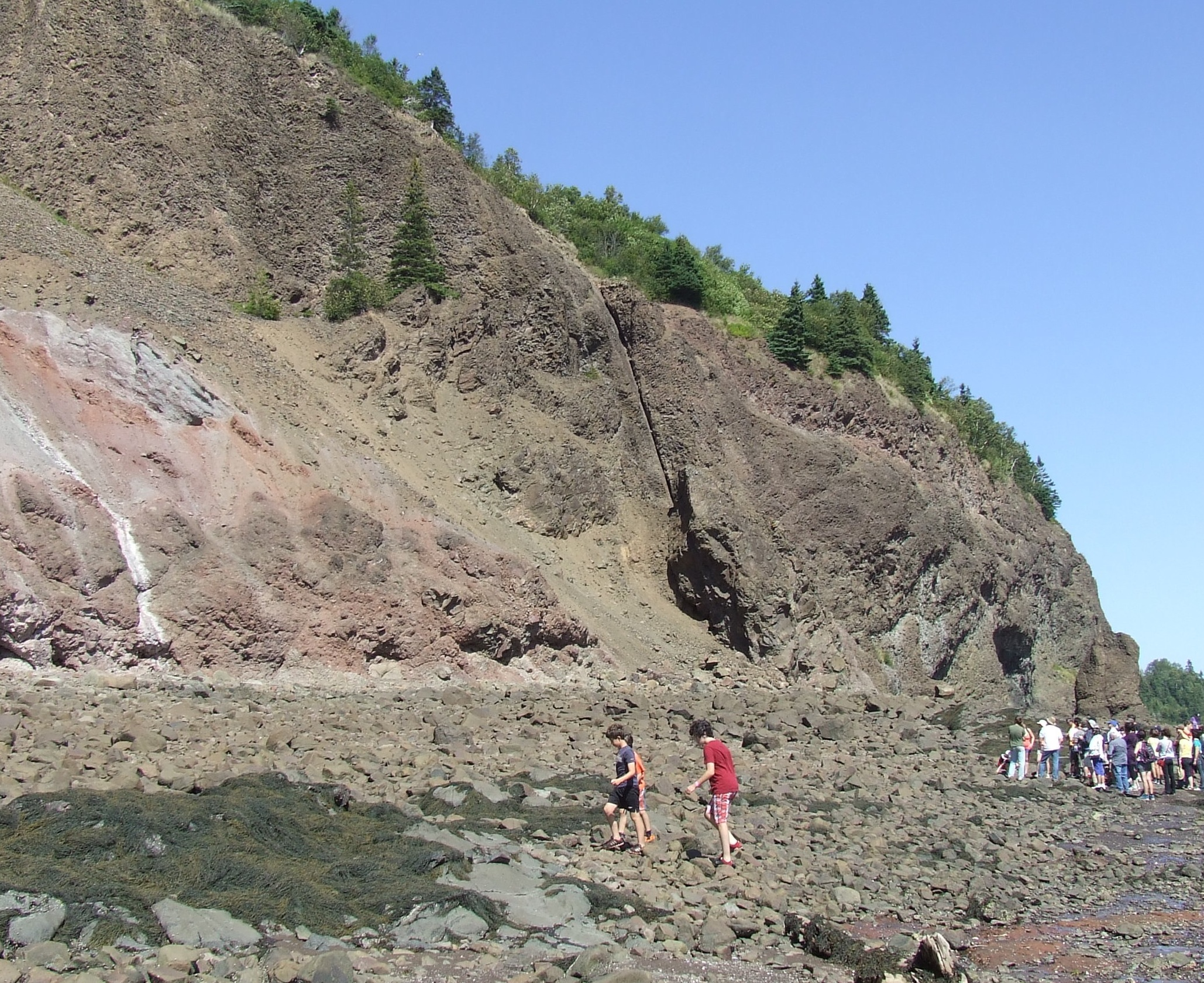
- Wasson Bluff's most easterly cliff showing reddish sandstone and grey basalt

- Location within Nova Scotia
- Location: Canada
- Coordinates: 45°23′30″N 64°14′32″W

Wasson Bluff (also known as Wasson's Bluff) is the name applied to a series of imposing cliff faces on the north shore of the Minas Basin about 5 miles (8.0 km) east of the town of Parrsboro, Nova Scotia. The cliffs, which stretch approximately one mile (1.6 km) from Wasson Brook in the east, to Swan Creek in the west, consist of 200-million-year-old rocks that have yielded a wide array of fossils including more than 100,000 bones from Canada's oldest-known dinosaurs as well as the smallest dinosaur tracks ever found. The fossils date from a critical time in the evolution of life, the boundary between the Triassic and Jurassic geological periods, when mass extinctions led not only to the dominance of the dinosaurs, but also to the evolution of groups of vertebrates, such as fish, crocodiles, frogs and mammals, whose descendants are still alive today. The abrasive action of the tides, considered to be the world's highest, constantly exposes fossils on the cliff faces, shores and seabed.

In 1990, Paul E. Olsen, one of the paleontologists who has conducted extensive fossil excavations at Wasson Bluff wrote: "Every time I stand before these cliffs, I feel dwarfed by the immensity of time."

== Geology ==
The cliffs at Wasson Bluff stand at the edge of the ancient rift valley known as the Fundy Basin. It was created when the supercontinent Pangaea began to break up about 225 million years ago. As the continental plates moved apart, they ruptured, and blocks subsided or rose along fault lines creating complex, twisted layers of rock turned at odd angles.

The orange and red sandstones visible at Wasson Bluff formed as rivers swollen by intense rains carried coarse sediments from nearby highlands into the Fundy Basin. Other deposits came from wind-blown sand dunes or from the sediments on the bottoms of shallow lakes that, at various times, occupied the floor of the basin. As Pangea broke apart, magma rose to the surface through deep fissures in the Earth's crust erupting as lava flows. This massive volcanic activity created the greenish-grey columns and grey-black blocks of basalt that form large sections of the cliffs.

== Fossil discoveries ==
=== Tiny dinosaur tracks ===
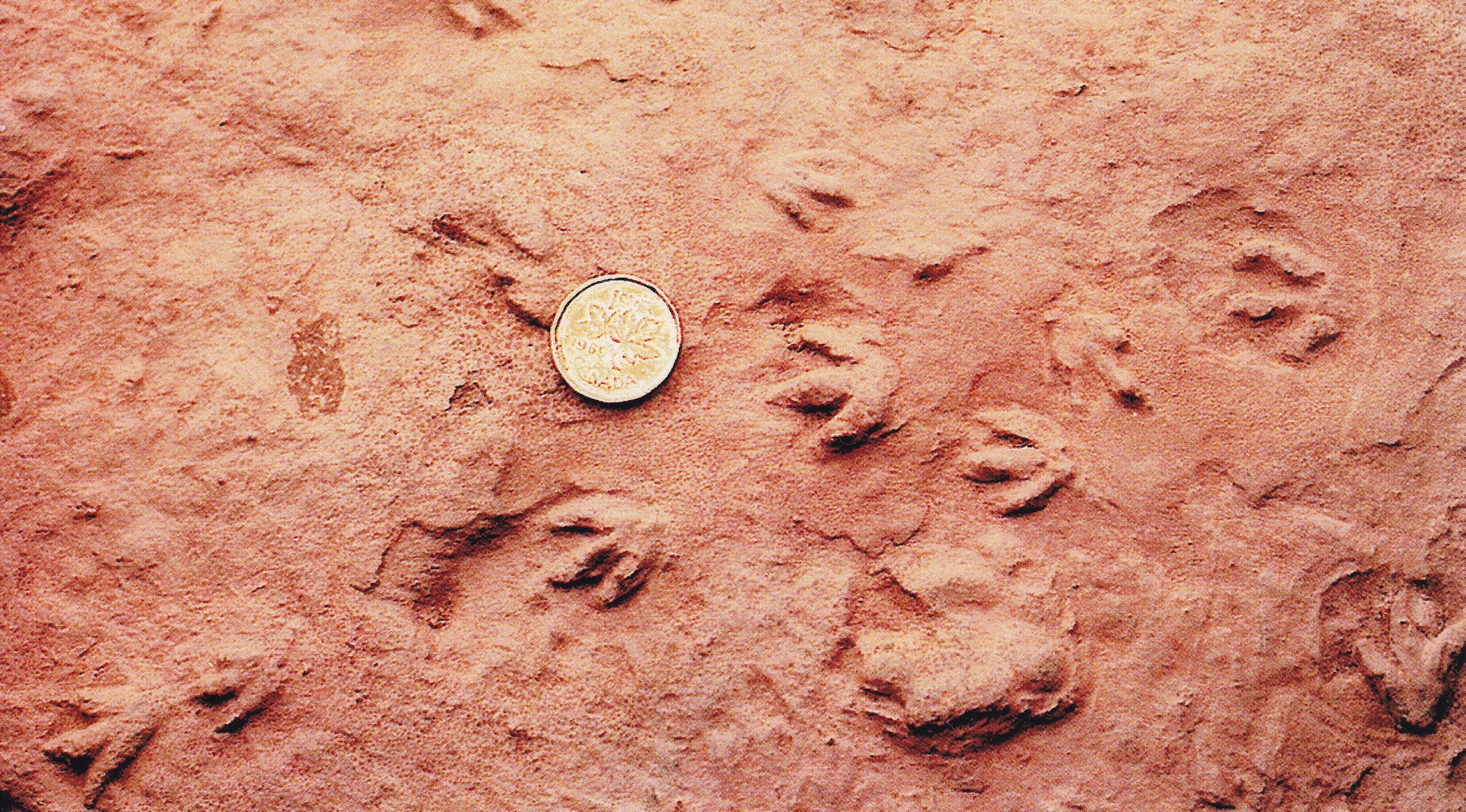
World's smallest dinosaur tracks

On April 10, 1984, veteran fossil hunter and amateur geologist, Eldon George, made a discovery that drew the world's attention to Wasson Bluff. George was riding along the shoreline on his all-terrain vehicle when he stopped behind an outcropping to take shelter from the wind. As he bent over his ATV to warm his hands, his experienced eye picked out what appeared to be tiny tracks. Using a jackknife, he gradually exposed five fossil trackways imprinted in a slab of sandstone measuring 16 by 14 inches (41 cm × 36 cm). The three-toed, penny-sized footprints were made by a theropod dinosaur about the size of a robin. They were the smallest dinosaur tracks ever found.

Although the tiny dinosaur tracks are Eldon George's most famous discovery, he made many others in a career that began in the 1940s and ended with his death in 2018. His finds include a wide variety of fossilized amphibian and dinosaur prints that were displayed, along with the world's smallest dinosaur tracks, at his Parrsboro Rock and Mineral Shop before he donated them to the Fundy Geological Museum in 2015. One of them, also found at Wasson Bluff, is a 17-inch (43 cm) track that may have been made by a primitive, two-legged, crocodile-like creature that was nearly 20 feet (6.1 m) long.

=== Rich fossil beds ===
In January 1986, American paleontologists Paul Olsen and Neil Shubin announced they had recovered hundreds of thousands of bones at Wasson Bluff, the largest fossil find in North America dating from the geological period 200 million years ago known as the Triassic-Jurassic boundary. It was a time when massive lakes of lava spewed from fissures in the earth as the supercontinent Pangea broke apart. Some scientists believe that the volcanic eruptions and the poisonous gases they released caused the mass extinction of nearly half of the world's creatures ending a period dominated by huge reptiles and enabling dinosaurs to become dominant. The sandstone and basalt cliffs at Wasson Bluff were formed during the Triassic-Jurassic boundary. They contain fossil remains of the creatures who lived both before and after the mass extinction.

In 1984, Neil Shubin found the jaw of a mammal-like reptile known as a trithelodont, the first such discovery in North America. The next summer he and Paul Olsen, along with Hans-Dieter Sues of the Royal Ontario Museum and William Amaral, Charles Schaff, and Steven Orzack of Harvard University, uncovered 12 complete skulls of trithelodonts, a discovery that has helped scientists gain a better understanding of the origins of mammals. They also retrieved many other fossils including teeth from small, bird-hipped dinosaurs, skulls of lizard-like creatures known as sphenodontids, ancestral crocodile bones and skulls, as well as fossilized fish and shark bones.

== Restrictions on fossil collection ==
A special permit is required before anyone can collect fossils or use rock hammers in the Wasson Bluff area. The site is protected under Nova Scotia's Special Places Protection Act. The law aims to preserve places that are important for cultural, historical and environmental reasons and that are significant sites for scientific research.
