= Fundy Geological Museum =

Museum in Nova Scotia, Canada

Coordinates: 45°23′41.3″N 64°14′15.3″W

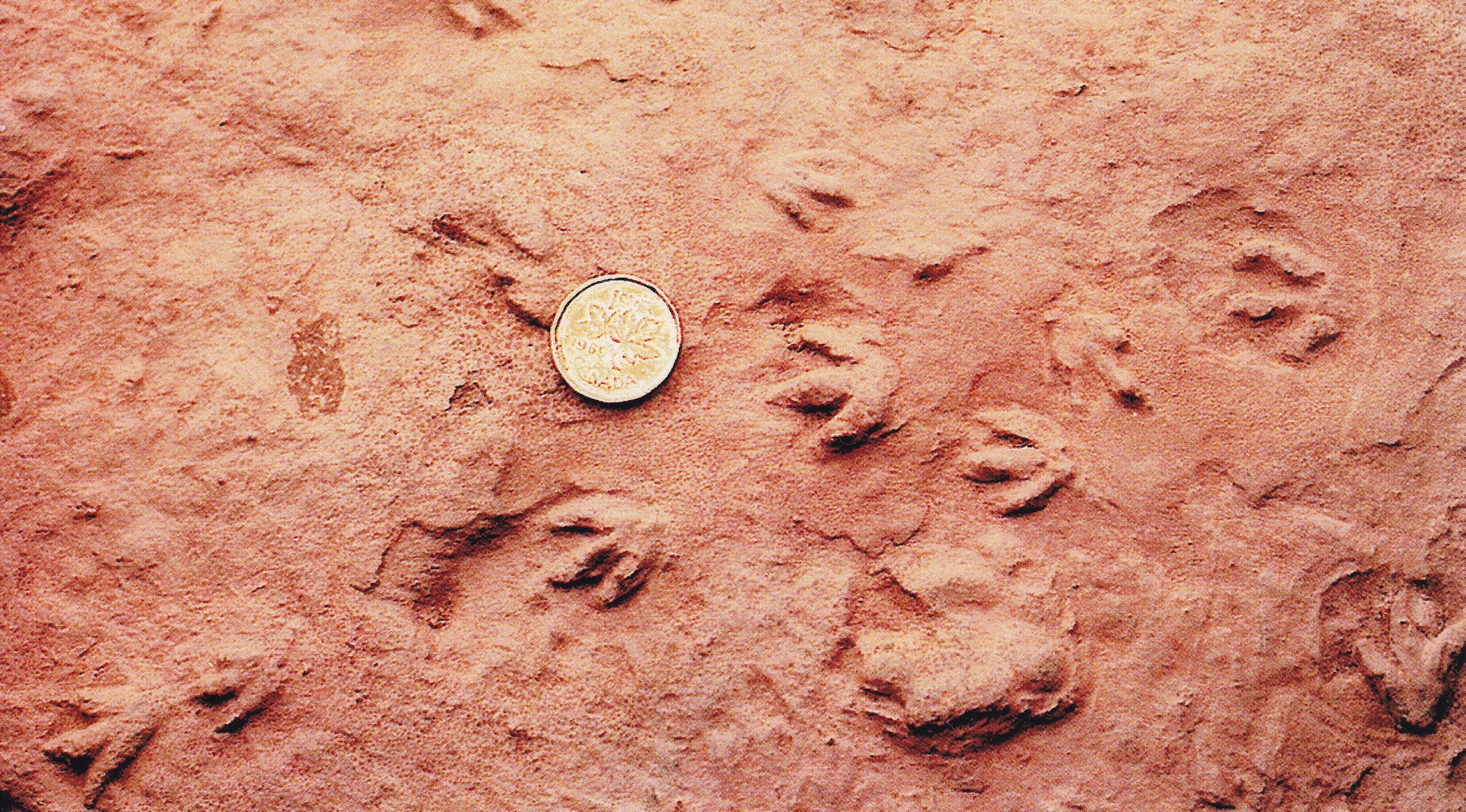
- World's smallest dinosaur tracks housed at the museum.
- Established: 1993
- Location: Parrsboro, Nova Scotia, Canada
- Type: Geological Museum
- Website: fundygeological.novascotia.ca

The Fundy Geological Museum is a geological museum in Parrsboro, Nova Scotia, Canada. It first opened in 1993. It has received over 300,000 visitors since it opened, averaging more than 21,000 per year. The museum is part of the Nova Scotia Museum system.

== Exhibits ==
The museum is primarily focused on the paleontological discoveries made at nearby Wasson Bluff, a geological site preserving fossils from around the time of the Triassic-Jurassic extinction, including Canada's oldest known dinosaurs such as the prosauropod dinosaur, Plateosaurus engelhardti and the theropod Coelophysis. It also contains exhibits on local minerals, the Joggins Fossil Cliffs, as well as an explanation of the Bay of Fundy tides.

== Other resources ==
The museum also has a gift shop and a laboratory where researchers are currently uncovering the skeleton of a 200-million-year-old Prosauropod dinosaur. It also hosts Nova Scotia's Gem and Mineral Show every year. The Gem and Mineral Show has been held annually for more than 40 years.

== Opening hours ==
From June 1 to October 15, the museum is open from 9:30 a.m. to 5:30 p.m. daily. For the rest of the year it operates on reduced winter hours.

== See also ==
- List of museums in Nova Scotia
