= East Fraserville =

Community in Nova Scotia, Canada

- Location of East Fraserville, Nova Scotia
- Coordinates: 45°23′53″N 64°38′26″W
- Country: Canada
- Province: Nova Scotia
- Municipality: Cumberland County
- Time zone: UTC-4 (AST)
- Postal code: B
- Area code: 902

East Fraserville is a rural community in the Canadian province of Nova Scotia, located in Cumberland County.
