= Parrsboro Harbour =

Coordinates: 45°23′16.14″N 64°19′12.62″W

Parrsboro Harbour at high tide, looking from Parrsboro Aboiteau.

Lighthouse at the mouth of Parrsboro Harbour where it meets the Minas Basin.

Parrsboro Harbour is a Canadian harbour located in Cumberland County, Nova Scotia.

Situated on the north shore of the Minas Basin at its western boundary, the harbour is fed by several fresh water sources:

- Farrell River (through the Parrsboro Aboiteau)
- Mill Creek
- Whitehall Creek

The harbour is completely tidal, emptying at low tide. It is marked by a lighthouse on the west side of the harbour entrance.

The town of Parrsboro sits on the shores of the harbour.

The harbour became a port of registry in 1850. In its peak years of the 1890s, over 1646 ships arrived and departed annually. Today it is regularly used by fishing vessels, a few recreational vessels and occasional visits by coastal freighters.
