= Parrsboro =

Community in Nova Scotia, Canada

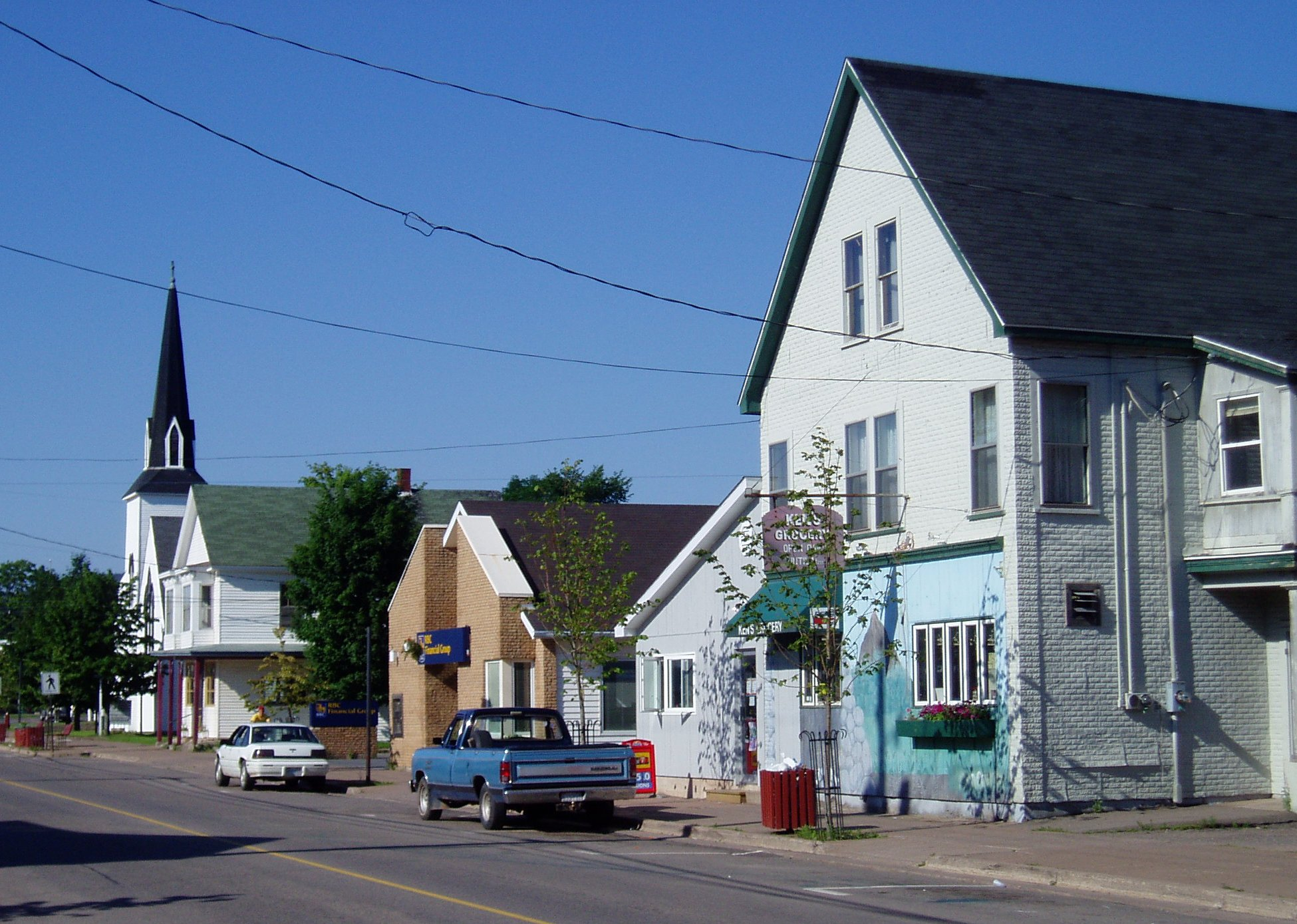
- Main Street Parrsboro

- Flag Seal
- Motto: Parrsboro 'Rocks'
- Location of Parrsboro
- Coordinates: 45°24′21″N 64°19′33″W
- Country: Canada
- Province: Nova Scotia
- Municipality: Municipality of the County of Cumberland
- Founded: 1670
- Incorporated: July 15, 1889
- Dissolved: November 1, 2016
- Electoral Districts Federal: Cumberland-Colchester
- Provincial: Cumberland South

Government
  - Councilor: Marchel Strong
  - MLA: Tory Rushton
  - MP: Alana Hirtle

Area (2016)
  - Total: 14.80 km^{2} (5.71 sq mi)
- Highest elevation: 47 m (154 ft)
- Lowest elevation: 0 m (0 ft)

Population (2016)
  - Total: 1,205
  - Density: 81.4/km^{2} (211/sq mi)
- Time zone: UTC-4 (AST)
  - Summer (DST): UTC-3 (ADT)
- Postal code: B0M 1S0
- Area code: 902
- Telephone exchange: 254
- Median Earnings*: $27,472
- NTS Map: 021H08
- GNBC Code: CBCYW
- Website: https://cumberlandcounty.ns.ca/
- Median household income, 2005 ($) (all households); Places in Nova Scotia

Parrsboro is a community located in Cumberland County, Nova Scotia, Canada.

A regional service centre for southern Cumberland County, the community is also known for its port on the Minas Basin, the Ship's Company Theatre productions, and the Fundy Geological Museum.

== History ==
Before the arrival of European settlers, Parrsboro was a portage point for Mikmaq travellers along the Minas Basin and Cumberland County river systems. The native inhabitants called the region "Awokum," meaning a 'short-cut' or 'passing-over point.'

The first European settlers were the Acadians in 1670 at the western mouth of the Parrsboro Harbour, near Partridge Island. After they were expelled in 1755, they were replaced by New England Planters. The centre of settlement gradually shifted from Partridge Island to the sheltered estuary of the Parrsboro River where a harbour and surrounding mills grew. The settlement, at first named Mill Village, was renamed Parrsboro in honour of Nova Scotia Governor John Parr in 1784, and the town was incorporated on July 15, 1889.

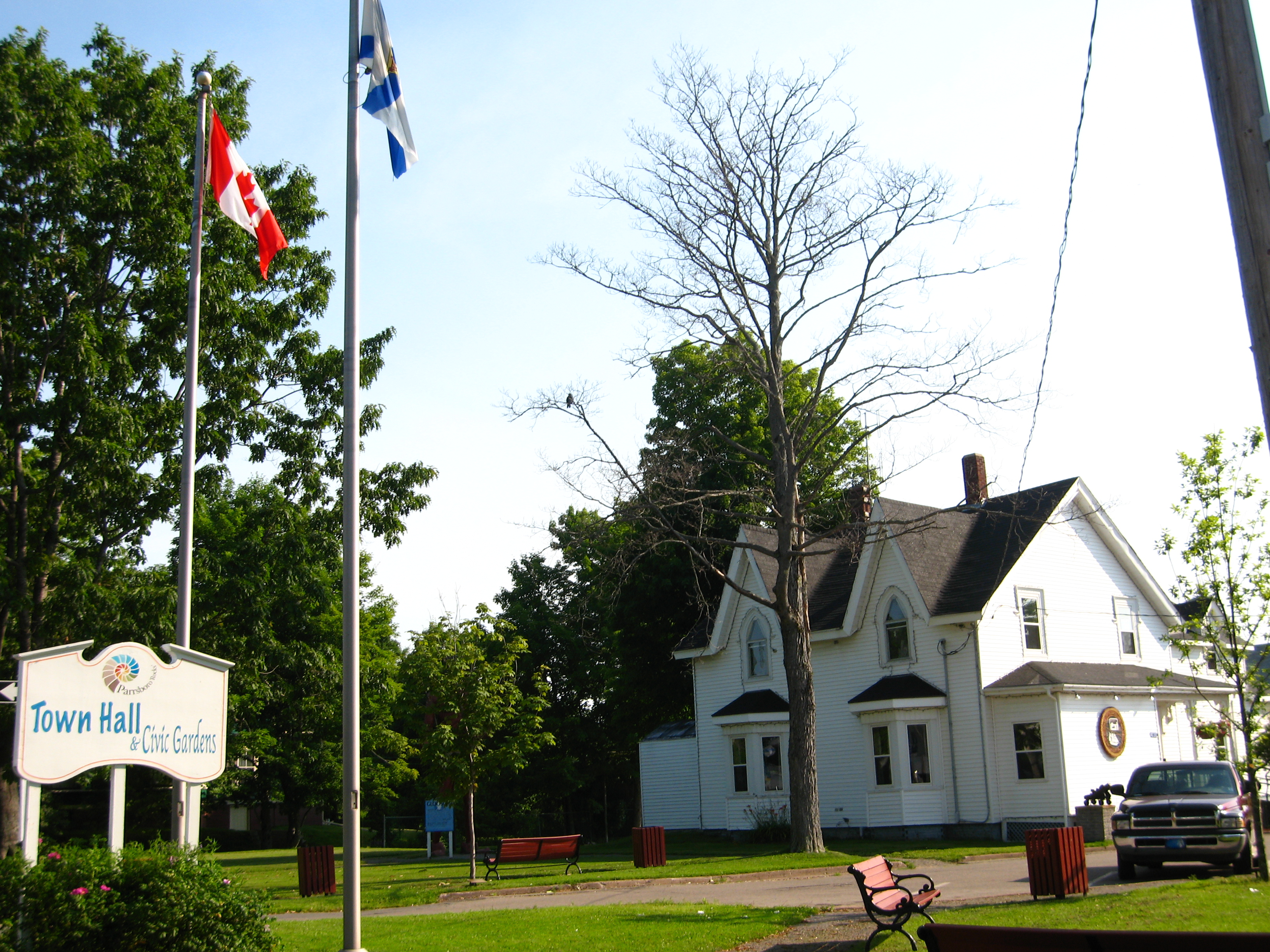
The Old Town Hall and Civic Gardens

Parrsboro thrived in the mid 19th century as the hub of a string of shipbuilding communities from Economy to Advocate collectively known as the "Parrsboro Shore". The town became a port of registry in 1850 for over 115 locally built schooners as well as giant square riggers, culminating in the largest, the ship Glooscap in 1891. In its peak years of the 1890s, over 1646 ships arrived and departed annually.

The Springhill and Parrsboro Railway began service to the town from the coal mining town of Springhill on July 1, 1877; Parrsboro became a coal shipping port for the Springhill mines, primarily serving Saint John, New Brunswick. Railway service to Parrsboro was abandoned on June 14, 1958, following several years of declining shipments, several months before the 1958 mining disaster.

Throughout the late 19th century and first four decades of the twentieth century, Parrsboro saw daily ferry service across the Minas Basin to the Annapolis Valley ports of Kingsport and Wolfville. The 13th and final vessel in this service, operated by the Dominion Atlantic Railway, was the MV Kipawo, which is now permanently beached at Parrsboro and incorporated into the Ship's Company Theatre performance centre.

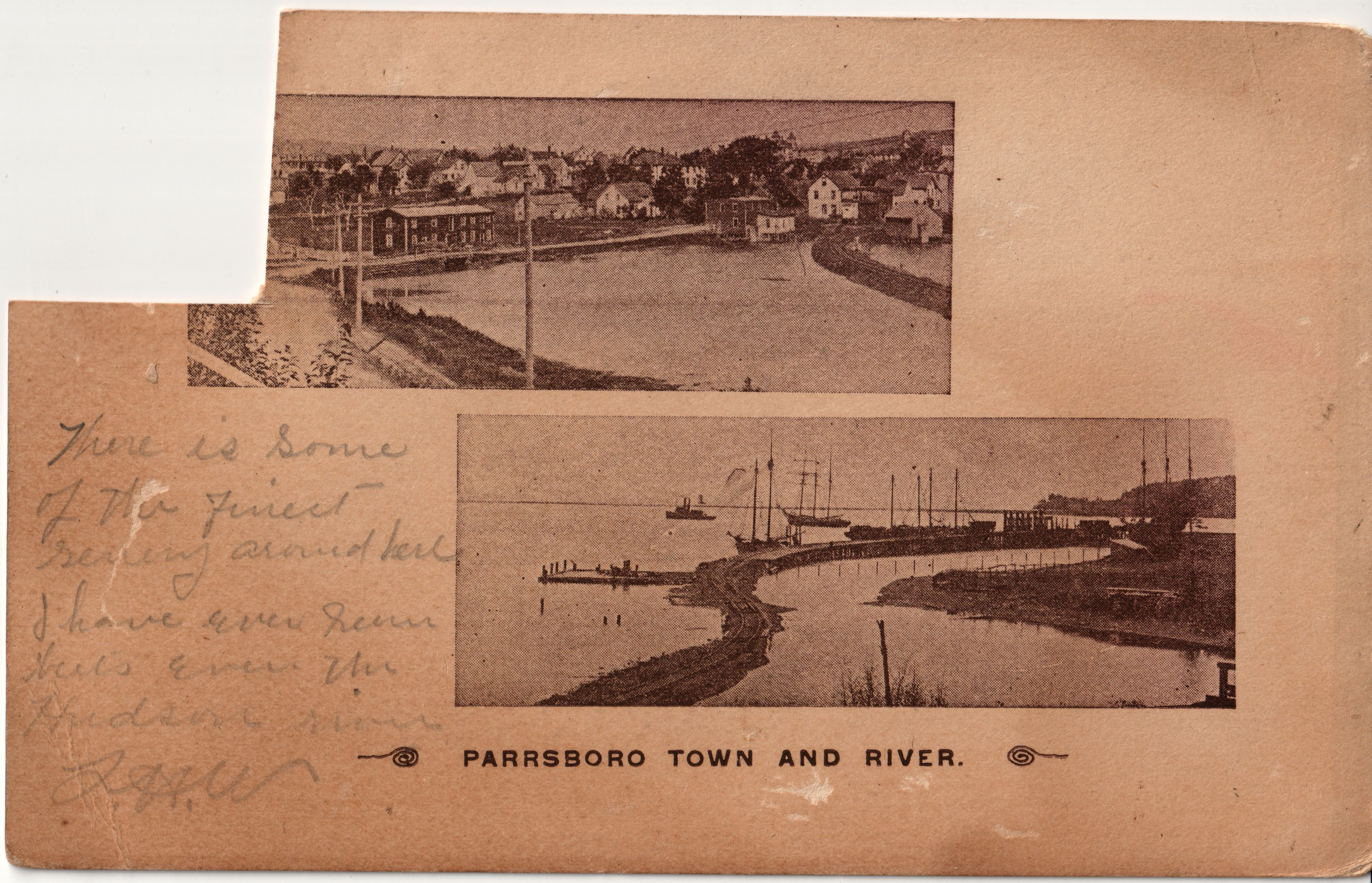
Parrsboro Town and River about 1906

A Handley Page V/1500 named Atlantic made a forced landing in Parrsboro July 5, 1919. When the starboard engine failed the pilot, Major Brackley saw the lights of the town during the night and landed. After three months, the aircraft was repaired and departed for Greenport, New York, Parrsboro's sister town. The local Air Cadet Squadron, 689 Handley Page, is named after this event.

On April 10, 1984, Parrsboro resident Eldon George located the world's smallest dinosaur footprints at Wasson Bluff, a series of cliffs to the east of Parrsboro Harbour. The prints are now on display at the Parrsboro Rock and Mineral Shop and Museum, owned by George.

== Municipal governance ==
Parrsboro was incorporated as a town on July 15, 1889. On October 5, 2015 the Town Council filed an application for dissolution with the Nova Scotia Utility and Review Board. The NSURB held public hearings in November 2015 and issued a decision on June 15, 2016 granting the application. The Town of Parrsboro was dissolved effective November 1, 2016 and merged into the larger Municipality of the County of Cumberland.

== Climate ==
Climate data for Parrsboro, 1991–2020 normals, extremes 1897–present
Month	Jan	Feb	Mar	Apr	May	Jun	Jul	Aug	Sep	Oct	Nov	Dec	Year
Record high °C (°F)	18.2 (64.8)	16.9 (62.4)	20.0 (68.0)	27.2 (81.0)	31.0 (87.8)	31.7 (89.1)	33.3 (91.9)	33.3 (91.9)	29.4 (84.9)	27.4 (81.3)	22.5 (72.5)	18.9 (66.0)	33.3 (91.9)
Mean daily maximum °C (°F)	−0.8 (30.6)	−0.5 (31.1)	3.0 (37.4)	8.8 (47.8)	15.1 (59.2)	19.7 (67.5)	23.1 (73.6)	23.1 (73.6)	19.3 (66.7)	13.7 (56.7)	7.9 (46.2)	2.4 (36.3)	11.2 (52.2)
Daily mean °C (°F)	−5.8 (21.6)	−5.6 (21.9)	−1.6 (29.1)	4.0 (39.2)	9.6 (49.3)	14.1 (57.4)	17.5 (63.5)	17.5 (63.5)	14.1 (57.4)	8.8 (47.8)	3.6 (38.5)	−1.9 (28.6)	6.2 (43.2)
Mean daily minimum °C (°F)	−10.8 (12.6)	−10.5 (13.1)	−6.2 (20.8)	−0.9 (30.4)	4.0 (39.2)	8.5 (47.3)	11.9 (53.4)	11.8 (53.2)	8.9 (48.0)	3.9 (39.0)	−0.7 (30.7)	−6.2 (20.8)	1.1 (34.0)
Record low °C (°F)	−35.6 (−32.1)	−35.0 (−31.0)	−27.2 (−17.0)	−23.9 (−11.0)	−9.4 (15.1)	−3.9 (25.0)	−0.6 (30.9)	−3.9 (25.0)	−5.6 (21.9)	−11.7 (10.9)	−23.3 (−9.9)	−31.7 (−25.1)	−35.6 (−32.1)
Average precipitation mm (inches)	112.5 (4.43)	83.9 (3.30)	96.3 (3.79)	104.8 (4.13)	98.0 (3.86)	100.2 (3.94)	85.2 (3.35)	82.3 (3.24)	122.0 (4.80)	114.4 (4.50)	111.9 (4.41)	135.6 (5.34)	1,247.1 (49.10)
Average snowfall cm (inches)	60.9 (24.0)	48.8 (19.2)	45.5 (17.9)	17.0 (6.7)	1.4 (0.6)	0.0 (0.0)	0.0 (0.0)	0.0 (0.0)	0.0 (0.0)	0.1 (0.0)	10.6 (4.2)	46.0 (18.1)	230.3 (90.7)
Average precipitation days (≥ 0.2 mm)	17.6	16.3	16.2	16.6	16.2	14.9	14.0	13.7	14.0	15.3	16.9	18.9	190.4
Average snowy days (≥ 0.2 cm)	10.8	9.6	8.0	3.4	0.36	0.0	0.0	0.0	0.0	0.05	2.6	8.7	43.4
Average relative humidity (%) (at 15:00 LST)	70.6	65.6	60.4	58.9	61.9	64.7	67.5	65.8	66.3	67.1	70.6	74.6	66.2
Source: Environment Canada (snow 1981–2010)

== Area features ==
Historical population
Year	Pop.	±%
1881	1,206	—
1891	1,909	+58.3%
1901	3,391	+77.6%
1911	2,856	−15.8%
1921	2,748	−3.8%
1931	1,919	−30.2%
1941	1,971	+2.7%
1951	1,906	−3.3%
1956	1,849	−3.0%
1961	1,834	−0.8%
1981	1,799	−1.9%
1986	1,729	−3.9%
1991	1,634	−5.5%
1996	1,617	−1.0%
2001	1,529	−5.4%
2006	1,401	−8.4%
2011	1,305	−6.9%
2016	1,205	−7.7%
2021	1,327	+10.1%

As with much of rural Nova Scotia, the primary industry in Parrsboro is tourism. The community is known for its seasonal theatre productions at the Ship's Company Theatre, fossil and rock hounding attractions, museums, high tides and heritage buildings. The cliffs along the Minas Basin to the east and west of Parrsboro contain fossils of prehistoric animals and plants. Many fossils are on display in local museums.

Of the three museums in Parrsboro, two are dedicated to geological history. The Fundy Geological Museum, located along the eastern shore of Parrsboro Harbour, and the Parrsboro Rock and Mineral Shop and Museum, along the western shore, display many unearthed discoveries and provide information on the history of the region's landscape.

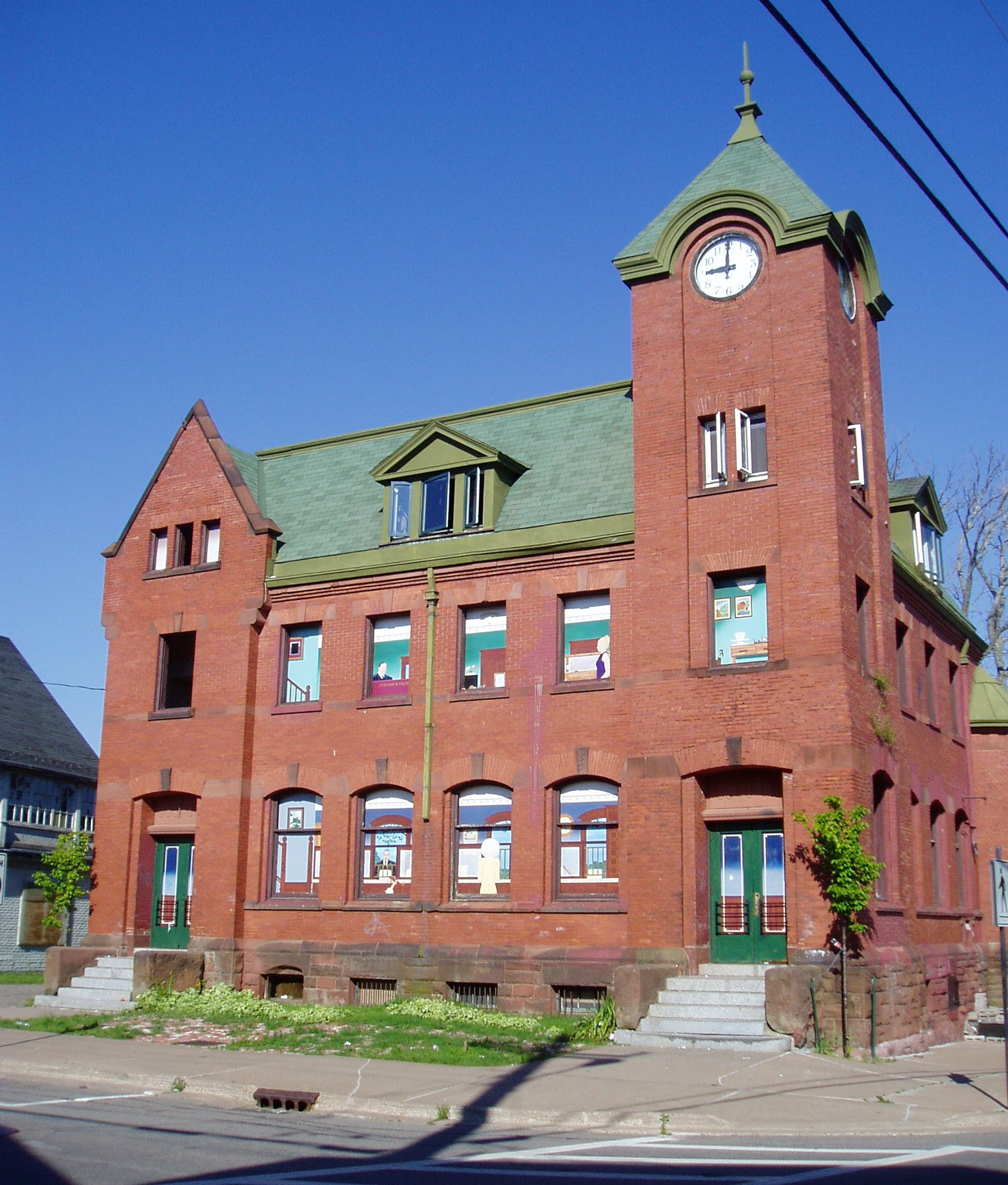
The former post office, armoury and customs house (1913) was converted into a space for artistic and cultural activities, but it is closed now.

The third museum is the Ottawa House. It was built 1775 but contains evidence of Acadian construction as well as several additions. Located along the western coast of Parrsboro Harbour, near Partridge Island, it occupies the original town site and is near the legendary landing site of Henry Sinclair, 1397, and the factual site of Samuel de Champlain, 1607. It was the summer home of Father of Confederation Sir Charles Tupper, 1860s, and was named in honour of Canada's Capital. A major focus is Parrsboro's shipbuilding history and the museum has many artifacts that date from the Age of Sail.

A three-storey clock tower is a prominent feature of Parrsboro's Main St. The tower is part of a big, red-brick government building that was partially opened in 1913 and completed the following year. The building housed an armoury that conducted military training during both World Wars, a post office, a customs house and a weather station. The federal government sold it to private interests in 1973 when the post office moved to another location.

A cultural and community centre, known locally as The Hall, has been a prominent feature of community life for more than a century. It is located in a former Presbyterian Church at 44 King St. that dates from 1884. The Town of Parrsboro purchased the building in 1942 and used it for school purposes. It served as a school auditorium and music room as well as a space for household and vocational training. The extensively renovated building is now run by the Parrsboro Band Association. It features concert performances by the Parrsboro Citizens' Band, one of the oldest such citizens' bands in Canada. Professional musicians also perform at The Hall and there are frequent community "Open Mic" nights. Films are regularly shown in its movie theatre and it provides space for community meetings, theatre rehearsals and fundraising events.

Other community features include local churches, a public library, a primary and secondary school, and a 50-watt radio station, Parrsboro Community Radio, heard at 99.1 FM.

== Economy ==
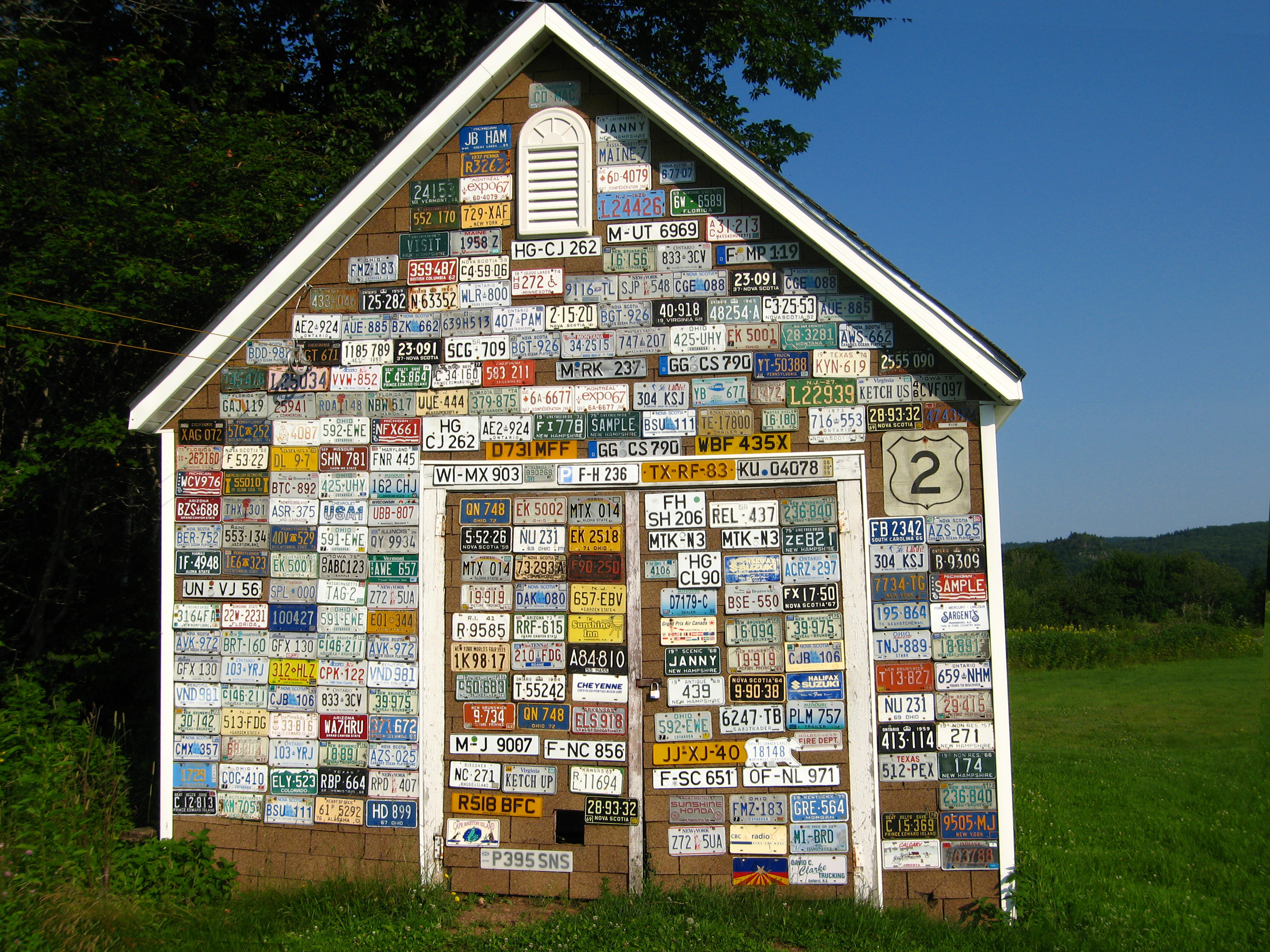
Tourism is the town's main industry.

Although Parrsboro has a flourishing tourism industry and several small businesses, the community - common to many maritime communities faces economic challenges. The decline of wooden shipbuilding in the late 19th century dealt a severe blow to the local economy, along with neighbouring communities such as Port Greville and Shulie. The community also suffered from the depletion of local forests and the closing of the Springhill coal mines which ended coal shipments and railway service. A further blow was felt from highway route changes in the late 1950s as part of the Trans-Canada Highway project; Highway 2 was the primary highway from Truro to Amherst until the upgrading (and new construction) of Highway 4 through the Wentworth Valley to form the present-day expressway Highway 104. These changes contributed to an economic decline in Parrsboro in the latter half of the 20th century after some businesses, such as the O'Regan's garage and car dealership, moved to larger population centres.

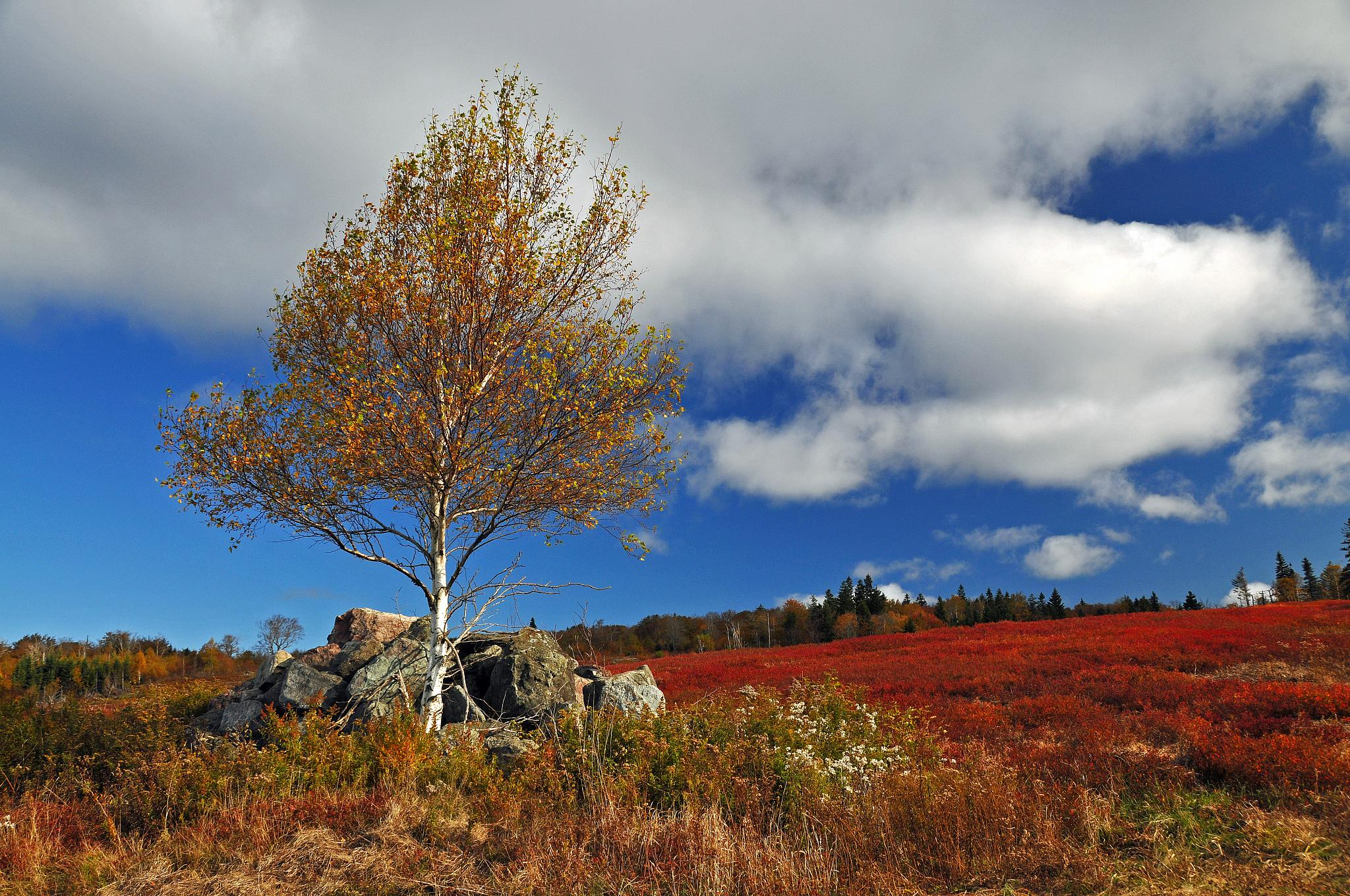
Parrsboro blueberry fields

A number of businesses have remained consistent and sustainable in Parrsboro, owing to the community's central location along the north shore of the Minas Basin. There is a number of small coastal fishing operations in the area and the community is also the base of operations for several large blueberry harvesting companies, as well as being home to Granby Furnaces, a firm which has found a success in producing home heating appliances (oil furnaces, cast boilers, heat exchangers, etc) for export. There are many seasonal accommodations businesses in the Parrsboro area to serve the tourism industry, which primarily operates during the summer and fall seasons.

In 2006, Headz Gamez, a British Columbia-based board game manufacturer, announced that it was relocating 1,500 manufacturing jobs from its facilities in China to Parrsboro. Promises of manufacturing facilities, employee housing and recreation facilities were made; however, the project was cancelled later that year after the CEO sold off his personal company stock and resigned his position. The company declared bankruptcy in early 2007.

== Notable residents ==
- Walter Harris Callow
- Sir Charles Tupper
- Abraham Pineo Gesner
- Eldon George
- Charles Brenton Huggins

== Demographics ==
The 2021 Census of Population conducted by Statistics Canada showed a population of 1327 living in the former Town of Parrsboro living in 662 of its 817 total private dwellings, a change of 10.1% from its 2016 population of 1,205. With a land area of 14.8 km^{2} (5.7 sq mi), it had a population density of 81.4/km^{2} (210.9/sq mi) in 2016.

== Sister cities ==
- Greenport, New York, United States

== See also ==
- List of municipalities in Nova Scotia
