= Port Greville =

Community in Nova Scotia, Canada

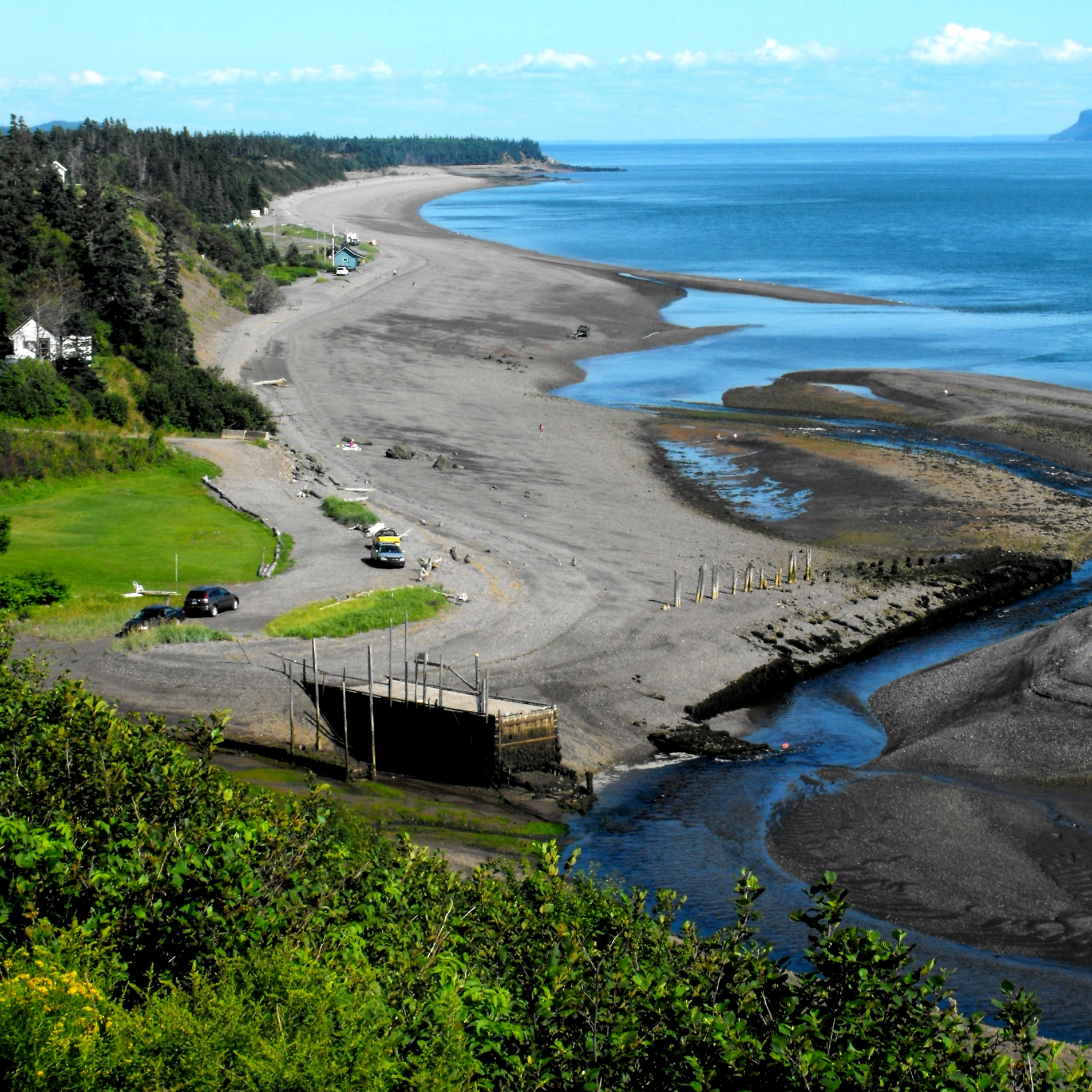
- Beach at low tide in Port Greville, showing remnants of early port facilities

- Location of Port Greville, Nova Scotia
- Coordinates: 45°24′N 64°32′W
- Country: Canada
- Province: Nova Scotia
- Municipality: Cumberland County
- Founded: 1784
- Electoral Districts Federal: Cumberland-Colchester
- Provincial: Cumberland South

Government
  - Councilor: Marchel Strong
  - MLA: Tory Rushton (PCNS)
  - MP: Alana Hirtle
- Highest elevation: 133 m (436 ft)
- Lowest elevation: 0 m (0 ft)
- Time zone: UTC-4 (AST)
- Postal code: B0M-1T0
- Area code: 902

Port Greville is a rural community in Cumberland County, Nova Scotia. It is named after the Greville Bay, a small section of the Bay of Fundy. It is also home of the Age of Sail Museum of maritime history.

== History ==
Port Greville was the location of the construction of many sailing ships used in trade mainly with the American New England states. Many sea captains came from the area with names such as Wagstaff, Pettis and Merriam.

One such vessel was the three masted schooner 'Minas King', captained by George Merriam with his cousin J.Randall Merriam operating as first mate. Randall Merriam later became a Master Mariner (inland waters) and captained several of the Canadian National ferries operating between Cape Tormentine New Brunswick and Borden PEI.

=== Lighthouse ===
Port Greville's lighthouse was built in 1907 along Wagstaff Road, where it overlooked the harbour. After the Wagstaff-Hatfield Shipyard closed in the 1970s, traffic in the harbour decreased and the lighthouse was no longer necessary. After being discontinued by the Coast Guard, the lighthouse was removed from its original location in 1981 and taken to Cape Breton Island, where it became a decorative feature at the Coast Guard College in Westmount.

After the Age of Sail Museum opened in 1994, community members formally requested to have the lighthouse returned to Port Greville. The Coast Guard brought the lighthouse back to the community in 1998. It currently sits on the grounds of the Age of Sail Museum.

== Geology ==
Port Greville straddles the Minas Fault Zone. Though the fault is not currently experiencing seismic activity, its effects can be viewed from space and on the ground. The portion of Port Greville south of the fault line is characterized by flat and open fields, while the northern part is defined by hills and forests. Prominent fault scarps can be viewed along the Greville River.

== Fire Department ==
The FPW Volunteer Fire Brigade is located in Port Greville. The name FPW stands for "Fox River, Port Greville, Wards Brook", as the department serves these two neighbouring communities in addition to Port Greville. Brookville is also located within the service area of FPW.
