= List of communities in Antigonish County =

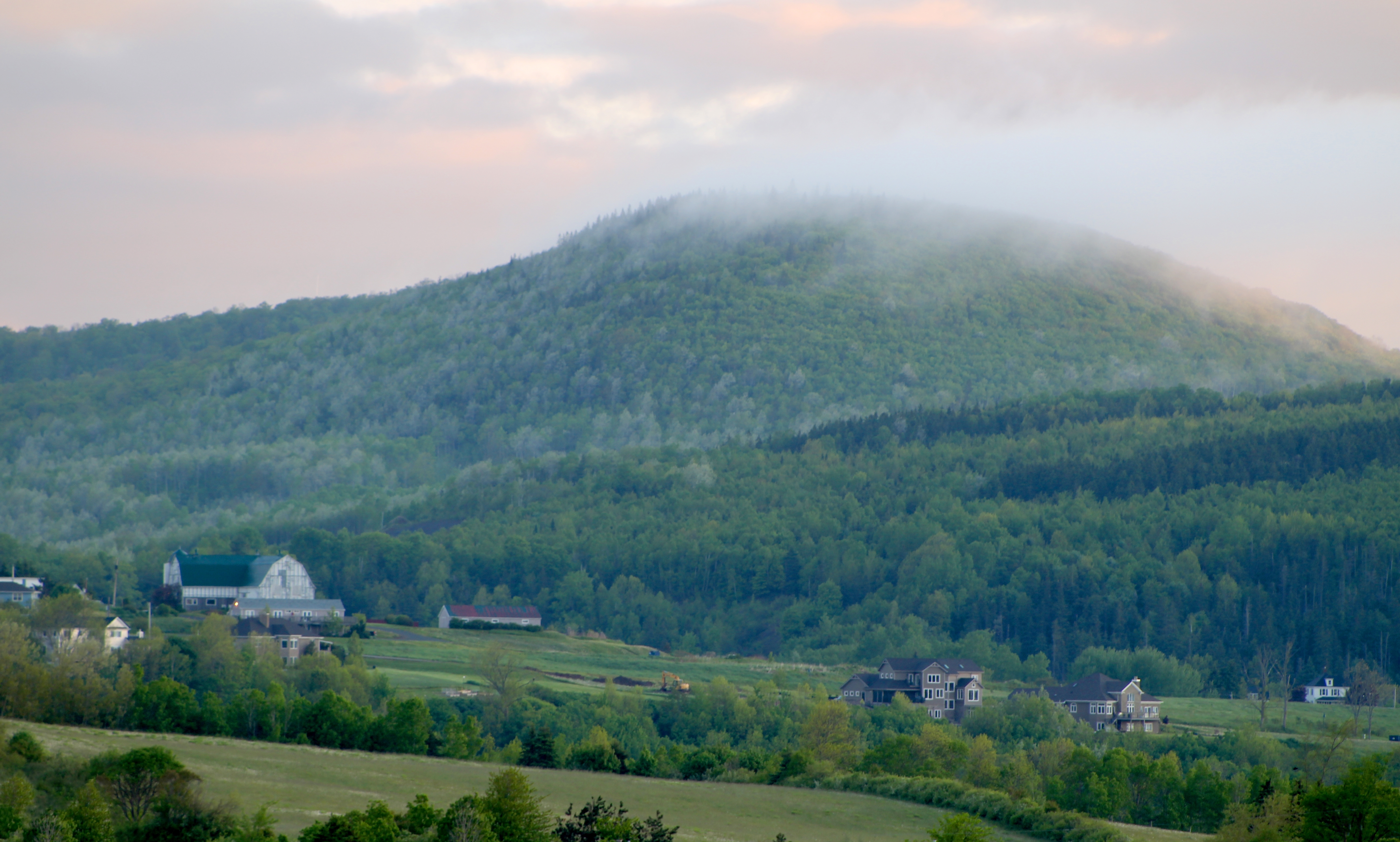
Sugarloaf Mountain, Antigonish, Nova Scotia

Antigonish County, Nova Scotia contains a number of communities. Many of them have Gaelic names.

Communities are ordered by the highway on which they are located, whose routes start after each terminus near the largest community.

== Trunk routes ==
- Trunk 4: James River – Antigonish – Lower South River – Bayfield Road – Afton 23 – Tracadie – Monastery – Linwood
- Trunk 7: Antigonish – Salt Springs – Ashdale – Glen Alpine – North Lochaber – Lochaber
- Trunk 16: Monastery – Upper Big Tracadie

== Arterial highway ==
- Highway 104: Pomquet Forks – Auld's Cove

== Collector roads ==
- Route 245: Antigonish – North Grant – Malignant Cove – Doctors Brook – Arisaig – McArras Brook
- Route 316: St. Andrews – Frasers Mills – Upper South River
- Route 337: Antigonish – Antigonish Harbour – Morristown – Lakevale – Cape George – Ballantynes Cove – Livingstone Cove – Georgeville – Malignant Cove

== Rural roads ==
- Addington Forks
- Bayfield
- Big Marsh
- Brierly Brook
- Caledonia Mills
- Clydesdale
- Dunmaglass
- Havre Boucher
- Heatherton
- Ireland
- Merland
- Marydale
- Morar
- New France
- Ohio
- Pomquet
- Southside Antigonish Harbour
- St. Joseph
- West Lochaber
