= List of historic places in Antigonish County, Nova Scotia =

Antigonish County is a historical county and census division of Nova Scotia, Canada. This list compiles historic places recognized by the Canadian Register of Historic Places within the county.

== List of historic places ==
Name	Address	Coordinates	Government recognition (CRHP №)	Wikidata ID	Image
Antigonish County Court House National Historic Site of Canada	170 Main Street; Antigonish NS	45°37′00″N 62°00′00″W	Federal (7354)	Q23015916	Upload Photo
Leonard Carey Archibald House	40 Old South River Road; Antigonish NS	45°37′13″N 61°58′42″W	Antigonish municipality (15208)	Q137259067	Upload Photo
Bayfield School	588 Bayfield Road; Bayfield NS	45°37′44″N 61°44′47″W	Bayfield municipality (15668)	Q137259079	Upload Photo
Cape George Heritage School Museum	5758 Highway 337; Cape George NS	45°51′05″N 61°55′40″W	Cape George municipality (14585)	Q136799071	Upload Photo
Cape George Lighthouse	Highway 337; Cape George NS	45°52′27″N 61°54′01″W	Federal (20718)	Q28375755	More images
Holy Rosary Church	6205 Highway #337; Ballantynes Cove NS	45°51′28″N 61°55′32″W	Ballantynes Cove municipality (15401)	Q137259093	Upload Photo
Kings United Church	21 Copper Lake Road; Loch Katrine NS	45°24′57″N 61°57′03″W	Loch Katrine municipality (14084)	Q137259139	Upload Photo
Kirk Place	219 Main Street; Antigonish NS	45°37′21″N 61°59′22″W	Nova Scotia (6804)	Q137259169	Upload Photo
Captain MacDougall House	12559 Havre Boucher Road; Havre Boucher NS	45°39′20″N 61°31′31″W	Havre Boucher municipality (15185)	Q137259176	Upload Photo
Bard John MacLean Cemetery	No. 4 Highway; Glen Bard NS	45°20′33″N 62°05′27″W	Nova Scotia (7331)	Q137259187	Upload Photo
MacPhee House	1550 Highway 7 North Lochaber NS	45°27′17″N 62°00′42″W	North Lochaber municipality (15102)	Q137259199	Upload Photo
Manson House	Highway #7; North Lochaber NS	45°26′49″N 62°00′52″W	Nova Scotia (5235), North Lochaber municipality (15167)	Q137259209	Upload Photo
Pettipas House	9707 Highway 4 Tracadie NS	45°37′15″N 61°38′14″W	Tracadie municipality (15043)	Q137259228	Upload Photo
St. George's Church	9415 Highway 337; Georgeville NS	45°49′27″N 62°01′25″W	Georgeville municipality (14171)	Q137259232	Upload Photo
St. Joseph's Glebe House	2733 Addington Forks Road; St. Joseph NS	45°32′21″N 62°04′39″W	Nova Scotia (4237), St. Joseph municipality (15207)	Q137259243	Upload Photo
St. Margaret's Church	5559 Highway 245; Arisaig NS	45°46′31″N 62°09′57″W	Arisaig municipality (15384)	Q137259273	Upload Photo
Saint Ninian's Cathedral	121 Saint Ninian's Street; Antigonish NS	45°37′12″N 61°59′37″W	Nova Scotia (4600)	Q26907430	More images
St. Peter's Roman Catholic Church	9676 Highway #4; Tracadie NS	45°37′25″N 61°38′26″W	Nova Scotia (7337), Tracadie municipality (15390)	Q137259284	Upload Photo
Tracadie United Baptist Church	274 Highway 16; RR#1; Monastery NS	45°34′54″N 61°35′19″W	Monastery municipality (15181)	Q137162611	Upload Photo

== See also ==
- List of historic places in Nova Scotia
- List of National Historic Sites of Canada in Nova Scotia
- Heritage Property Act (Nova Scotia)
