= St. Georges Bay (Nova Scotia) =

Bay in Nova Scotia, Canada

Coordinates: 45.75°N 61.75°W

Location of St. Georges Bay in Nova Scotia

St. Georges Bay is a bay with shore on the Nova Scotia peninsula and Cape Breton Island, Canada, thus comprising a sub-basin of the Gulf of St. Lawrence.

The bay measures approximately 25 kilometres (16 mi) wide at its mouth, between Cape George in the west, and Black Point in the east. Its western shore measures approximately 23 km (14 mi) in length from the northern tip of Cape George south to the entrance to Antigonish Harbour. Its southern shore measures approximately 43 km (27 mi) in length from the entrance to Antigonish Harbour through to the Strait of Canso at East Havre Boucher. The eastern shore measures approximately 42 km (26 mi) from Heffernan Point north to Black Point.

St. Georges Bay marks the northern end of the Strait of Canso, one of three outlets for the Gulf of St. Lawrence. It is a busy coastal shipping route on account of the Canso Canal; the Canadian Coast Guard maintains a Vessel Traffic Service (VTS) for the bay called "Canso Traffic" with separation schemes defining sea lanes on nautical charts.

== Islands ==
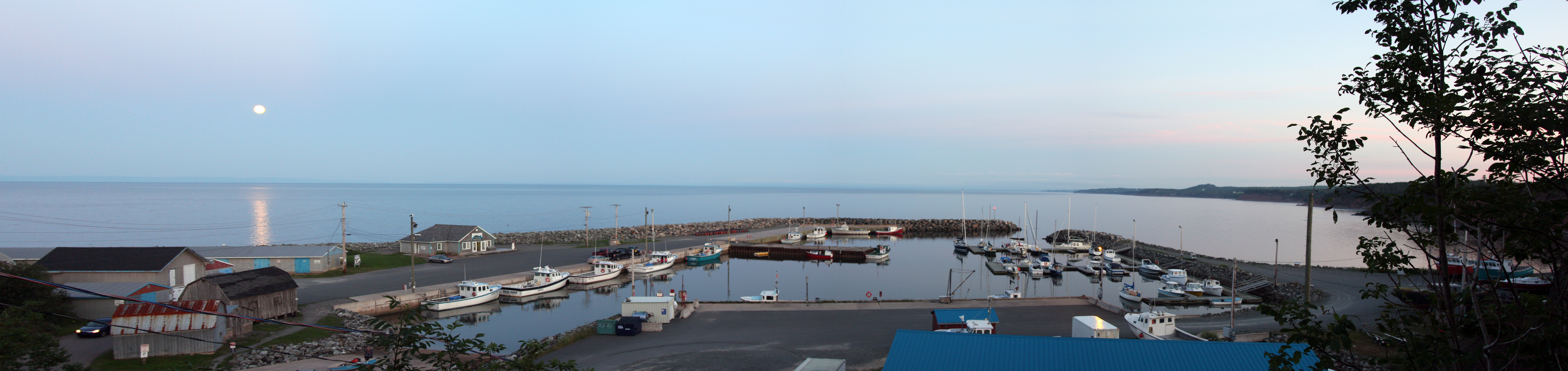
St. Georges Bay as seen from the marina at Ballantynes Cove

Islands within the bay include from northeast to south to northwest:

- Port Hood Island
- Henry Island

== Communities ==
Communities along the shoreline of St. Georges Bay include (from northwest to south to northeast):

Antigonish County

- Ballantynes Cove
- Cape George
- Lakevale
- Morristown
- Antigonish Harbour
- Antigonish
- Greenwold
- Williams Point
- Southside Antigonish Harbour
- Pomquet
- Bayfield
- Afton
- Tracadie
- Monastery
- Linwood
- Havre Boucher

Inverness County

- Craigmore
- Judique
- Judique North
- Harbourview
- Port Hood
- Port Hood Island

== See also ==
- List of communities in Nova Scotia
