= Sunrise Trail =

Roadway in Nova Scotia, Canada

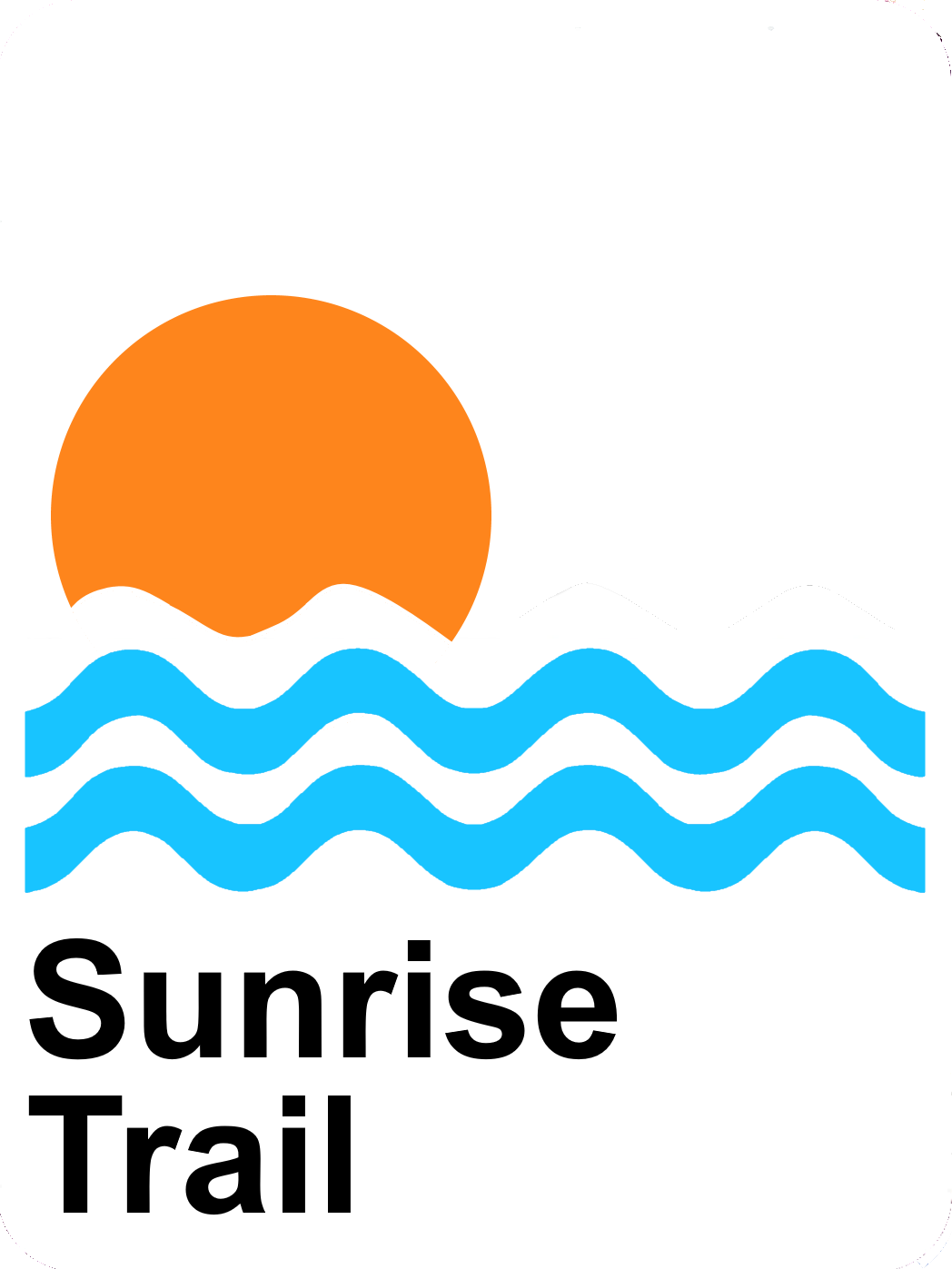
Sunrise Trail

Route information
- Maintained by Department of Transportation and Infrastructure Renewal
- Length: 333 km (207 mi)
- Component highways: Trunk 4; Trunk 6; Hwy 104 (TCH); Hwy 106 (TCH); Route 245; Route 337; Route 366

Major junctions
- West end: Trunk 6 / Hwy 104 (TCH) in Amherst
- East end: Canso Causeway

Location
- Country: Canada
- Province: Nova Scotia
- Counties: Cumberland County, Colchester County, Pictou County, Antigonish County

Highway system
- Provincial highways in Nova Scotia; 100-series

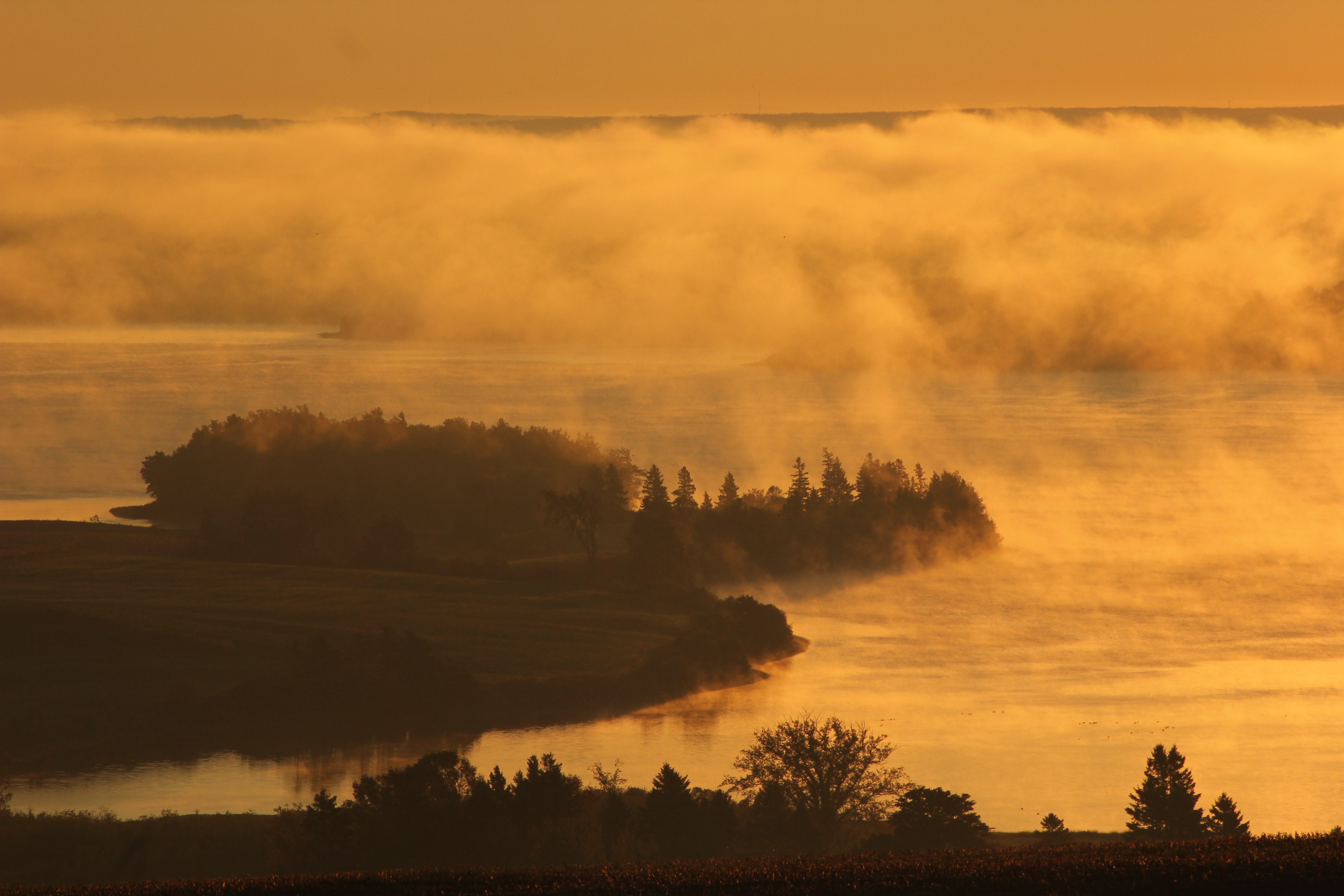
Sunrise over Antigonish Harbour on Nova Scotia's Sunrise Trail

The Sunrise Trail is a scenic roadway in the Canadian province of Nova Scotia. It is located along the province's North Shore on the Northumberland Strait for 333 km (207 mi) from Amherst to the Canso Causeway.

== Routes ==
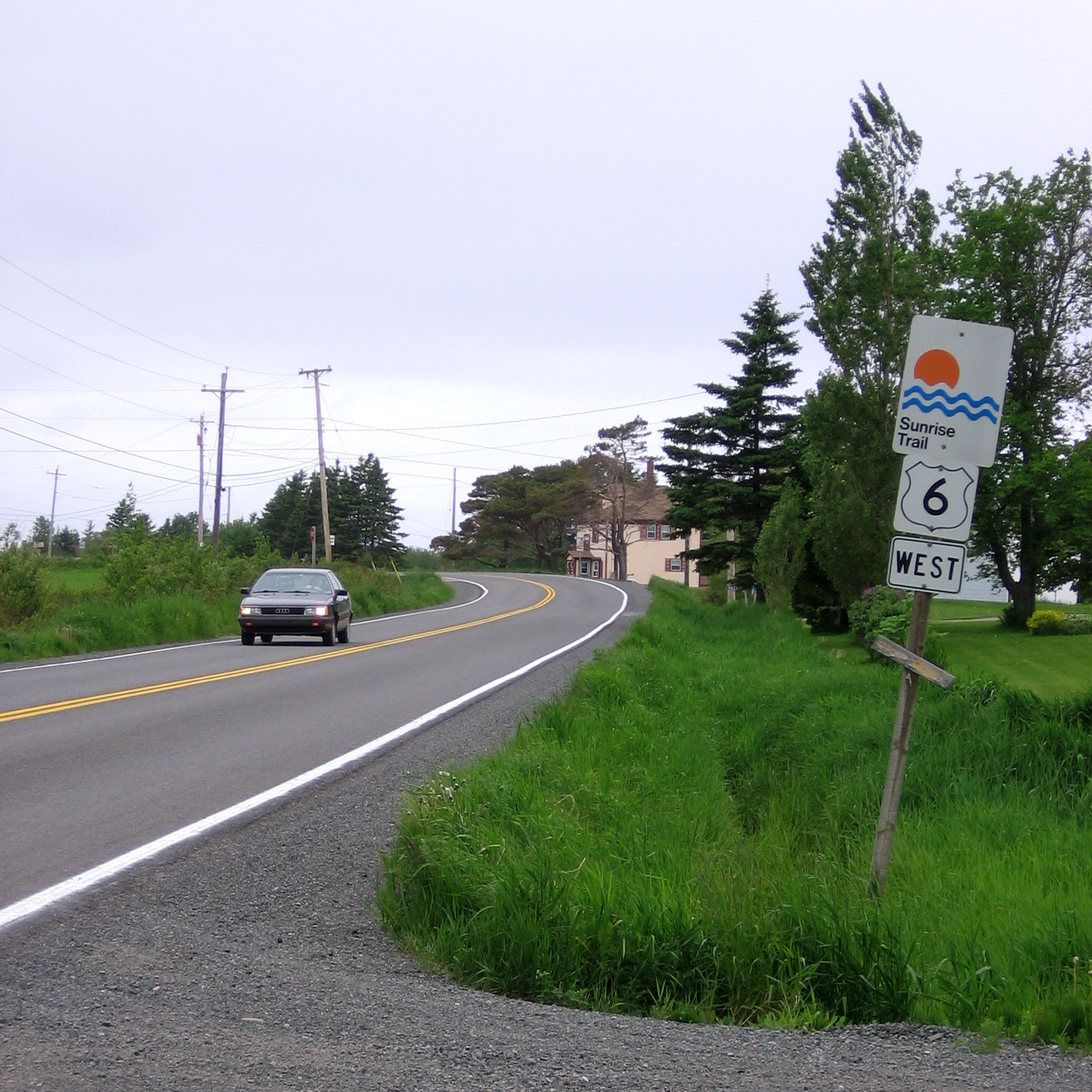
Nova Scotia Trunk 6 in the community of Toney River, about 16 kilometres east of Pictou

- Trunk 4
- Trunk 6
- Route 245
- Route 337
- Route 366
- Highway 104
- Highway 106

== Communities ==
- Amherst
- Truemanville
- Tidnish Bridge
- Tidnish
- Lorneville
- Port Howe
- Pugwash
- Wallace
- Malagash
- Tatamagouche
- River John
- Caribou
- Pictou
- New Glasgow
- Antigonish
- Doctors Brook
- Lower Barney's River
- Morristown
- Cape George
- Georgeville
- Malignant Cove
- Tracadie
- Havre Boucher
- Auld's Cove

== Parks ==
- Amherst Shore Provincial Park
- Arisaig
- Bayfield Beach
- Caribou/Munroes Island Provincial Park
- Fox Harbour Beach
- Gulf Shore Beach
- Heather Beach
- Melmerby Beach
- Nelson Memorial Provincial Park
- Northport Beach
- Powells Point
- Pomquet Beach
- Rushtons Beach
- Tatamagouche Provincial Park
- Tidnish Dock Provincial Park
- Waterside Beach
