= Nova Scotia Route 337 =

Highway in Nova Scotia, Canada

Route 337

Route information
- Maintained by Nova Scotia Department of Transportation and Infrastructure Renewal
- Length: 52 km (32 mi)

Major junctions
- South end: Trunk 4 in Antigonish
- North end: Route 245 in Malignant Cove

Location
- Country: Canada
- Province: Nova Scotia
- Counties: Antigonish

Highway system
- Provincial highways in Nova Scotia; 100-series
← Route 336	→ Route 340

Route 337 is a collector road entirely within Antigonish County, Nova Scotia. It is part of the Sunrise Trail scenic travelway and connects Antigonish with Malignant Cove.

== Route description ==
Route 337 begins 1 kilometre (0.62 mi) east of downtown Antigonish, on the main street, Trunk 4. It leaves the town heading northeast along Bay Street, passing near the hospital. It then follows St. Georges Bay for 30 kilometres (19 mi) heading north, until Cape George, where it turns west to follow the coast of the Northumberland Strait for 20 kilometres (12 mi). It ends at Malignant Cove, on Route 245.

== Communities ==
- Antigonish
- Morristown
- Ballantynes Cove
- Cape George
- Georgeville
- Malignant Cove
- Lanark
- Lakevale

== See also ==
- List of Nova Scotia provincial highways
