= Arisaig, Nova Scotia =

Community in Nova Scotia, Canada

Arisaig
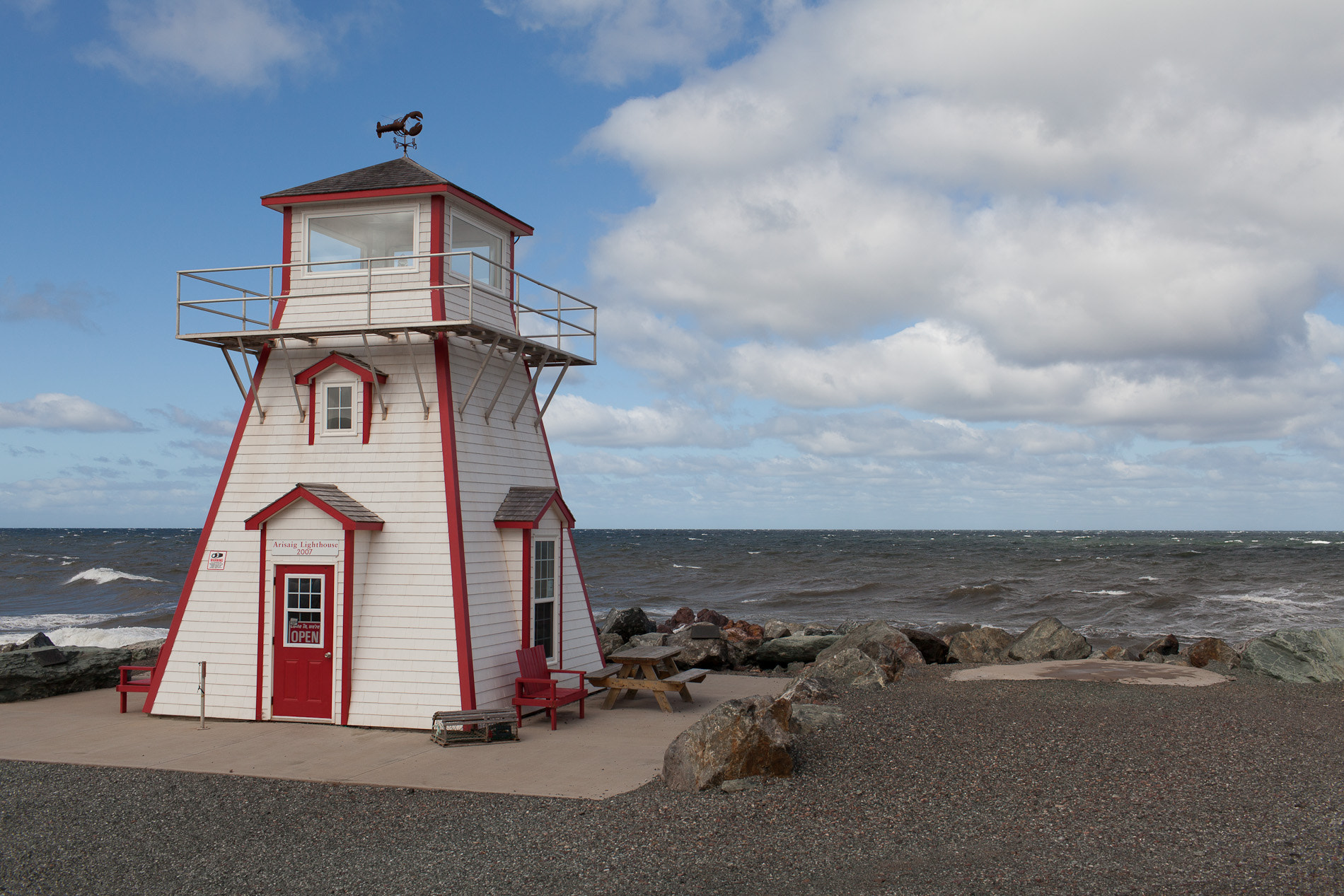
- Arisaig Lighthouse

- Location within Nova Scotia
- Coordinates: 45°45′37″N 62°09′45″W
- Country: Canada
- Province: Nova Scotia
- Municipality: Antigonish
- Time zone: UTC-4 (AST)
  - Summer (DST): UTC-3 (ADT)
- Postal code: B2G 2L1
- Area code: 902
- GNBC Code: CAAWP

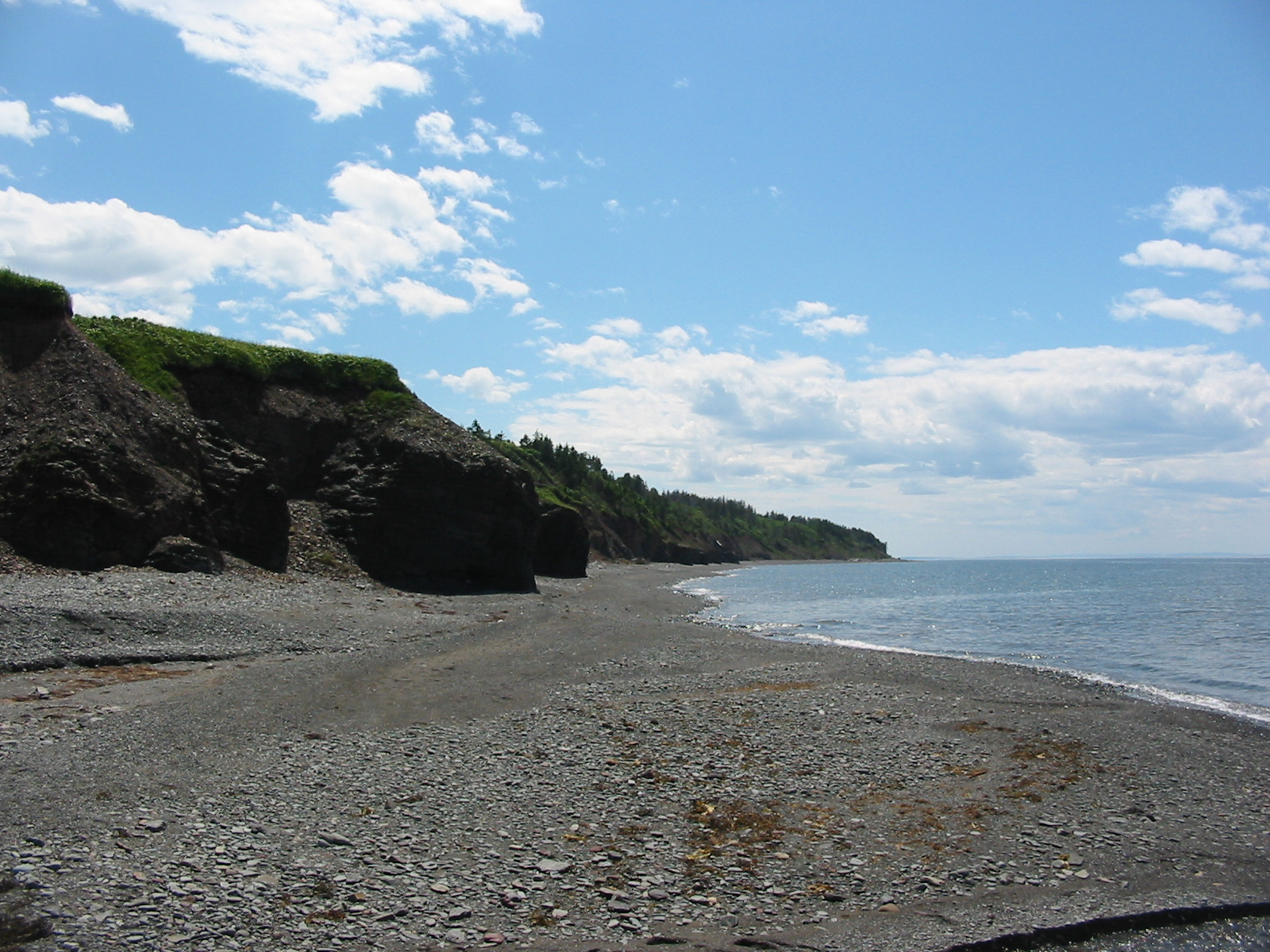
The beach at Arisaig

Arisaig (/ɛrɪsɛɡ/), (Scottish Gaelic: Àrasaig) is a small community in Antigonish County, Nova Scotia, Canada. It is located on the north coast of eastern mainland Nova Scotia, on the Northumberland Strait, and is connected to the town of Antigonish to the southeast and to New Glasgow to the west by Route 245, the "Sunrise Trail". Nearby communities include Doctors Brook, Malignant Cove, Knoydart, and McArras Brook.

The community was founded c. 1785 by Scottish immigrants who named it after their home, Arisaig, on the west coast of Scotland.

There is a government wharf and recently rebuilt lighthouse situated at Arisaig Harbour. The Roman Catholic church is dedicated to St. Margaret of Scotland. The present church was constructed in 1878 and the parish itself was established in 1792. Two cairns are situated in the community - one near the wharf marking the approximate site of the original log cabin church, and a second near the present church commemorating the centennial of its construction.

Despite being a member of the Nova Scotia branch of the Free Church of Scotland, the poet Iain mac Ailein, a highly important figure in both Scottish Gaelic literature and in that of Canadian Gaelic, felt able to build a very close friendship with Fr. Colin P. Grant, the Roman Catholic priest assigned to St. Margaret of Scotland Church in Arisaig. So close was their friendship that Iain Mac Ailein composed a work of Canadian Gaelic praise poetry in honor of Fr. Grant.

Arisaig Park, which borders on the Northumberland Strait, features significant fossil deposits.
