= Nova Scotia Route 245 =

Highway in Nova Scotia, Canada

Route 245

Route information
- Maintained by Nova Scotia Department of Transportation and Infrastructure Renewal
- Length: 63 km (39 mi)

Major junctions
- West end: Trunk 4 in Sutherlands River
- Route 337 in Malignant Cove
- East end: Trunk 4 / Trunk 7 in Antigonish

Location
- Country: Canada
- Province: Nova Scotia
- Counties: Pictou, Antigonish

Highway system
- Provincial highways in Nova Scotia; 100-series
| ← Route 242 | → Route 246 |

Route 245 is a collector road in the Canadian province of Nova Scotia. Route 245 is part of the Sunrise Trail.

The route spans Pictou and Antigonish counties and connects Sutherlands River at Exit 27 on Highway 104 with Antigonish at Trunk 4.

== Communities ==
- Sutherlands River
- Egerton
- Merigomish
- Lower Barney's River
- Doctors Brook
- Malignant Cove
- Maryvale
- Antigonish

== Parks ==
- Arisaig Provincial Park

== History ==
The entirety of Collector Highway 245 was once designated as Trunk Highway 45.

== See also ==
- List of Nova Scotia provincial highways
