= Lochaber (disambiguation) =

Lochaber is an area of the Highlands of Scotland.

Lochaber can also mean:

== Places ==
- Lochaber, Nova Scotia, in Antigonish County
  - North Lochaber, Nova Scotia, in Antigonish County
  - South Lochaber, Nova Scotia, in Guysborough County
  - West Lochaber, Nova Scotia, in Antigonish County
- Lochaber Mines, Nova Scotia, in the Halifax Regional Municipality
- Lochaber, Quebec, a township
- Lochaber-Partie-Ouest, Quebec, a township

== Other ==
- Lochaber axe, a Scottish war axe
- "Lochaber", a Scottish folk melody best known as the tune for "Mingulay Boat Song"
