= École du Sommet =

Coordinates: 44°42′00.23″N 63°40′43.12″W

École Secondaire du Sommet

Location
- 500 Larry Uteck Boulevard; Halifax, Nova Scotia; Canada

Information
- Established: 2010
- Principal: Joël Arsenault
- Grades: 6–12
- Mascot: Griffe le Cougar
- Team name: Cougars
- Website: sommet.ednet.ns.ca

École Secondaire du Sommet is a French public high school in Halifax, Nova Scotia. It is part of the Conseil scolaire acadien provincial. It opened in 2010 with grades 6 to 11, and now serves grades 6 to 12. It was established to diminish the number of students from the overcrowded school École du Carrefour, and now accommodates over 600 students. It is situated on Larry Uteck Boulevard. The mascot of this school is the Cougar. It was officially opened 5 December in 2010 even though students started in September. The current principal of the school is Joël Arsenault alongside vice principal Émilie Vaillancourt.
