= Greenwold =

Greenwold may refer to:

in Canada

- Greenwold, Nova Scotia

in the United States

- Greenwold (Dover, Delaware) listed on the National Register of Historic Places listings in Kent County, Delaware

In India

- Greenwold, Ghaziabad, UP
