= Turbonilla whiteavesi =

Scientific classification
- Kingdom: Animalia
- Phylum: Mollusca
- Class: Gastropoda
- Family: Pyramidellidae
- Genus: Turbonilla
- Species: T. whiteavesi

Binomial name
- Turbonilla whiteavesi Bartsch, 1909

Species of gastropod

Turbonilla whiteavesi is a species of sea snail, a marine gastropod mollusk in the family Pyramidellidae, the pyrams and their allies.

== Distribution ==
This species occurs in the following locations:

- North West Atlantic

== Notes ==
Additional information regarding this species:

- Distribution: Shediac Bay and Prince Edward Island (from the northern tip of Miscou Island, N.B. to Cape Breton Island south of Chéticamp, including the Northumberland Strait and St. George's Bay to the Canso Causeway)
- Habitat: infralittoral of the Gulf and estuary
