= Dunmaglass =

Dunmaglass may refer to:

- Dunmaglass, Nova Scotia
- Dunmaglass, Scotland
