= Big Marsh, Nova Scotia =

Big Marsh, Nova Scotia could be the following places in Nova Scotia:

- Big Marsh in Antigonish County
- Big Marsh in Inverness County
