= Henry Island =

Henry Island may refer to:

- Henry Ice Rise, an ice rise in the Ronne Ice Shelf, Antarctica
- Henry Island, Antigua and Barbuda, an island in Antigua and Barbuda
- Henry Island (India), an island in India
- Henry Island (North Channel), an island in North Channel, Ontario
- Henry Island (Nova Scotia), an island in Nova Scotia
- Henry Island (Washington), an island in the San Juan Islands

== See also ==
- Henry Lawrence Island
- Henry Islands, a group of four small islands in the western part of Henry Bay, Antarctica
