= Paqtnkek-Niktuek No. 23 =

- Indian reserve
- Paqtnkek-Niktuek No. 23 Paqtnkek-Niktuek No. 23 (Canada)
- Coordinates: 45°35′55″N 61°44′28″W
- Country: Canada
- Province: Nova Scotia

Paqtnkek-Niktuek No. 23, formerly Pomquet and Afton 23, is a Miꞌkmaq reserve located in Antigonish County, Nova Scotia. It is one of three reserves owned by the Paqꞌtnkek First Nation. It comprises three blocks of land, all of which have been bisected by Nova Scotia Highway 104; two populated areas are near Afton, the third between Pomquet Forks and Heatherton.
