= Glen Alpine =

Glean Alpine may mean:

- Glen Alpine, New South Wales, Australia
- Glen Alpine, North Carolina, United States
- Glen Alpine, Nova Scotia, Canada
- Glen Alpine, Toowoomba, a heritage-listed house in Queensland, Australia
