= Pomquet =

Community in Nova Scotia, Canada

Coordinates: 45°37′36.9″N 61°50′40.8″W

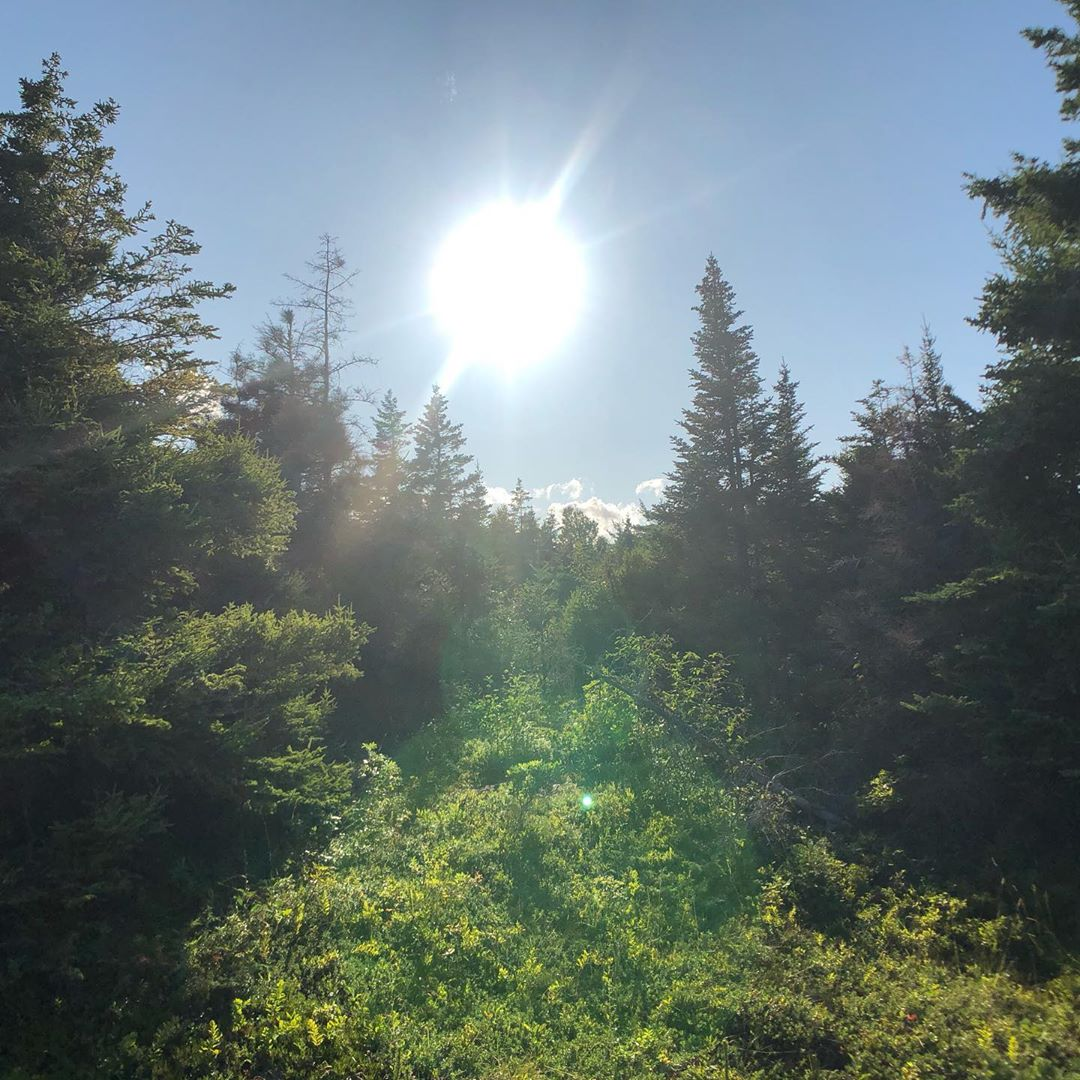
Pomquet Beach

Pomquet, Nova Scotia

Pomquet (/ˈpɒmkɛt/, French: [pɔ̃kɛ], locally [pʊmtʃɛt]) is a small Acadian village in Antigonish County, Nova Scotia, Canada.

Pomquet is home to approximately 900 inhabitants, mostly of Acadian ancestry. Many others visit and decide to make Pomquet their home for its beauty, sense of community, and connection to land and water. The community is nestled along two harbours (Pomquet and Monk's Head) separated from St. George's Bay by the barrier island that houses the unique Pomquet Beach.

Pomquet's beginnings date back thousands of years, when the Mi'kmaq settled the land and made use of the richness of the harbours, the bay and the forests. Acadians affected by the Great Expulsion of 1755, and French settlers came to the area in the late 18th century, and cleared the land bordering the two harbours for farmland. The relationship between the Mi'kmaq and the Acadians was one of mutual respect.

Pomquet residents have a strong sense of community, which was historically centred on the Roman Catholic Church. The Église Ste. Croix was built on a promontory in the centre of the community in the late 19th century. The church has been a focal point for many members of the community. The cemetery below the church records the genealogical history of the majority of families in Pomquet, including the founding families.

École Acadienne de Pomquet, which provides P-12 education entirely in French, is another focal point for community events.

Chez Deslauriers, la Société Acadienne Sainte-Croix (SASC) and the Pomquet Museum provide historical/touristic informations for visitors.

Pomquet has evolved into a community with a strong sense of self and connection to the land and water. Farming and fishing continue to be practiced in Pomquet, but most residents have found employment in the larger centre of Antigonish.

== History ==
The name Pomquet, also historically spelled Pomquette, is derived from the Mi'kmaq word "popumkek" or "pogumkek" likely meaning "sandy beach", "a good place to land", or "a sand beach with bushes growing on it". All of these are in reference to Pomquet Beach. The name "Pomquet" pays homage to the first inhabitants of the area – the Mi'kmaq.

The Ta’n Weji-sqalia’tiek Mi’kmaw Place Names Digital Atlas and Website Project, launched in 2010, lists the translation as "poqmkek" meaning "holes made for fishing". It also cites Silas Rand's Micmac Place-Names in the Maritime Provinces and Gaspé Peninsula (1919) which translates "pogumkek" as "raining along" and "dry sand".

It is not known when the first native people arrived in the Pomquet area. Mi'kmaq artifacts have been found in several locations along the shores of Pomquet Harbour, and Acadian oral history suggests that at least two burial grounds were present, one in Pomquet Point and the other in Monk's Head, at the site of the first chapel in Pomquet.

Pomquet was first settled by Acadians in 1773. These Acadians were exiles from Saint-Malo, France. They arranged passage to Nova Scotia with merchants from nearby Jersey, a British Crown Dependency. The families likely initially arrived in the Acadian community of Arichat and then traveled to Tracadie and Havre Boucher, before moving westward along the coastline to Pomquet Harbour.

The first families to arrive and settle on the shores of Pomquet Harbour were named Broussard, Duon (now Deon, D'Eon and DeYoung), Doiron, and Vincent (all Acadians) and Louis Lamarre, a Frenchman. When they arrived, 23 Mi'kmaq families were living in the area. In 1789, these five families were issued land grants along Pomquet Harbour and Taylor Creek (located near the present community hall) by the Nova Scotia government.

These families were joined between 1785 and 1794, by another group of exiled Acadians who had made their way from St. Malo and were likely related to the first group of settlers by marriage. These families were named Brosard (Broussard), Landry, Boudrot (now Boudreau), Melançon (now Melanson), Rosia (now Rogers), and Daigle, and accompanied by Louis Morell of Quebec. Another 16 land grants were issued in 1793 to the original settlers and to those following them.

In 1817, two soldiers (likely originally from Belgium), captured by the British during the Napoleonic Wars and imprisoned on Georges Island in Halifax Harbour made their way to Pomquet. They were Jean-Baptiste Reny-Rombaud or Reny-Rimbeau (now Rennie) and Jean-Baptiste Vendome (now Venedam). Settlers that arrived later in the 19th century included Philipart (likely French), LeCroix (now Cross) from St. Pierre and Miquelon, Toupais (likely French), Drouillet (origin unknown), Wolfe (from Chezzetcook), Benoit (from Tracadie), and Deslauriers (originally Jacquet from Quebec and now Delorey) from Tracadie.

The early settlers were self-sufficient, and initially survived mainly by fishing. They fished flatfish (flounder), eel, and smelts from Pomquet Harbour, trout and salmon from Pomquet River, and mackerel and lobsters from St. George's Bay.

After a few years, the settlers began clearing the land for growing crops and raising livestock.

From the initial arrival by Acadians, the settlement of Pomquet was linked to the Acadian communities of Arichat and Chéticamp in Cape Breton, economically, culturally, religiously, and by familial connections. The first Acadian and French settlers in Pomquet were mostly Roman Catholic and shortly after their arrival, were served by the Roman Catholic Church.

For the first few years after their arrival, the goal of the Acadian settlers was survival, establishing a claim to the land, and then clearing the land for farming. They were aided to a great extent by the Mi'kmaq and their knowledge of the land.

== École Acadienne de Pomquet ==
L'école Acadienne de Pomquet was built in 2001. There are more than 200 students from kindergarten to grade 12 that attend the school. The school is a member of the Conseil Scolaire Acadien Provincial (CSAP).
