= Toney River, Nova Scotia =

Community in Nova Scotia, Canada

Coordinates: 45°46′11.27″N 62°53′28.45″W

Toney River in Nova Scotia

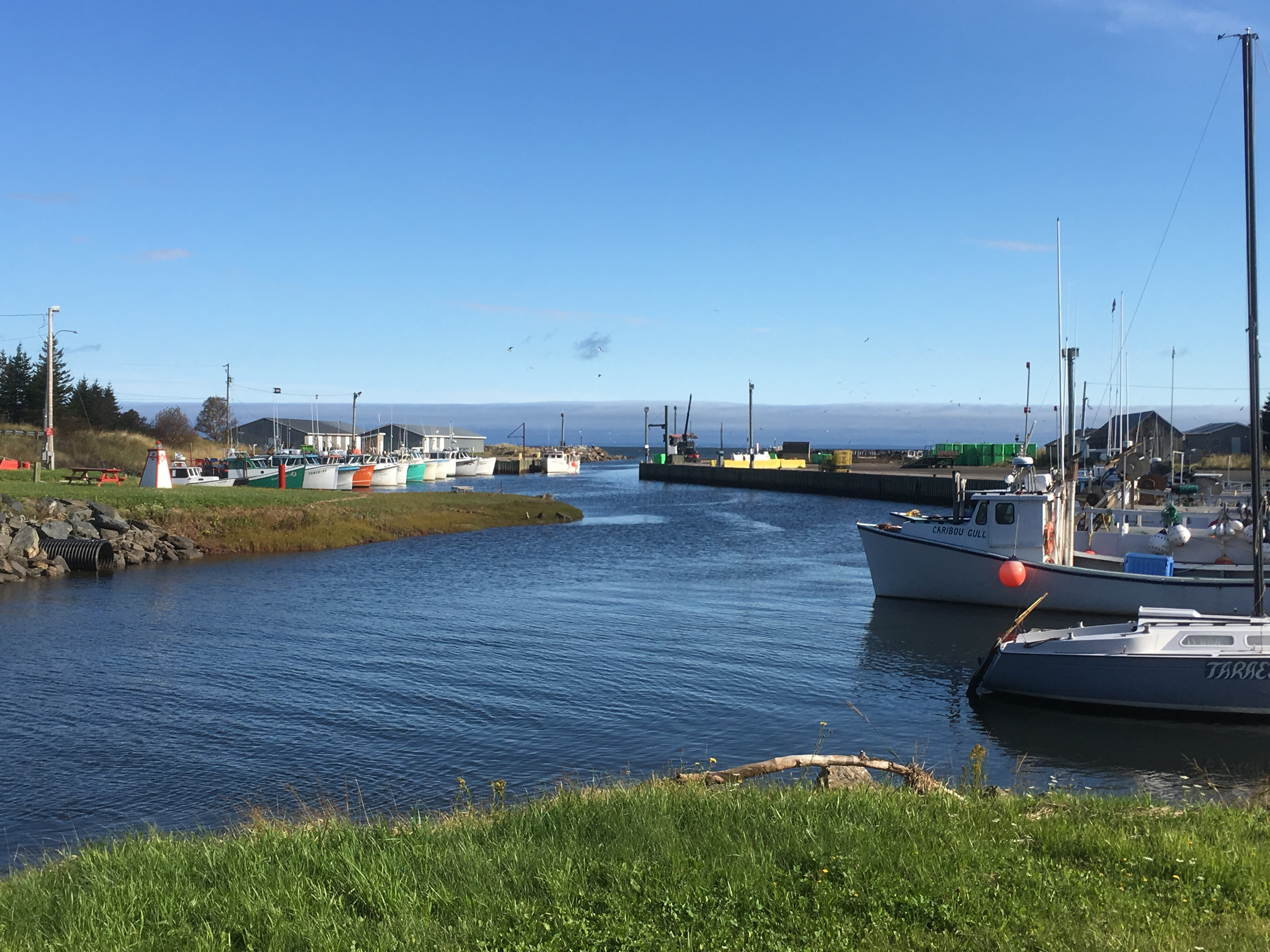
View seaward through Toney River harbor.

Toney River is a community in the Canadian province of Nova Scotia, located at the mouth of the Toney River in Pictou County. The river has a deep, narrow estuary which has been improved seaward of the Sunrise Trail bridge as a harbour including moorings for about a dozen fishing boats. The community is named after a Mi'kmaq chief who is reported to have signed the Halifax Treaties in 1761.

== History ==
Captain Toney, for whom the river and community was named, was an Acadian trader, who moored his ship at the mouth of the river to trade with the Mi'kmaq. He sailed along the coast from Quebec to New England exchanging the furs he received from the Mi'kmaq for food and manufactured goods. Although he might have preferred to remain neutral to continue this trading profession, the English considered him an enemy during the French and Indian War. (Toney may be the Mi'kmaq interpretation of Tourneur.) At the conclusion of hostilities, Captain Toney used his knowledge of the languages learned while trading to negotiate peace with the English for his Mi'kmaq trading partners. The Mi'kmaq sheltered Captain Toney as a member of their tribe so he might avoid the Acadian Expulsion. Toney River became part of the Philadelphia grant where the early Huguenot settlers remembered Captain Toney's name as Ledurney. (Ledurney is possibly their translation of Le Tourneur.)
