= École Bois-Joli =

School in Nova Scotia, Canada

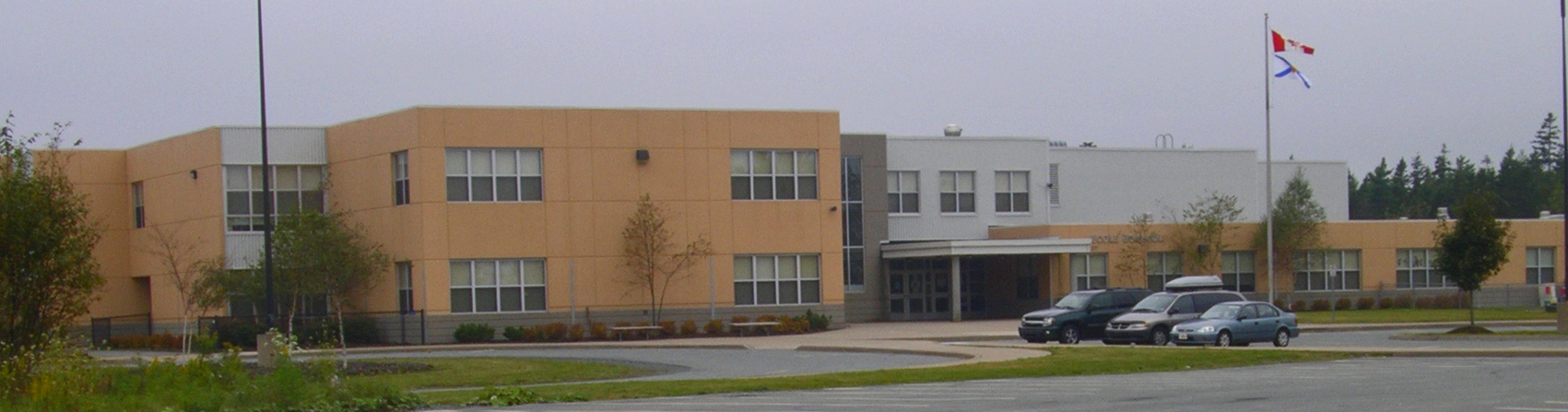

Location
- 211 Avenue du Portage; Dartmouth, Nova Scotia; Canada; 44°42′19.3″N 63°31′58.2″W

Information
- School type: Elementary School
- School board: Conseil scolaire acadien provincial
- Grades: Primary to 4
- Language: French
- Website: bois-joli.ednet.ns.ca
- Last updated: October 22, 2021

École Bois-Joli is a Canadian French language public school in Dartmouth, Nova Scotia. It is operated by Conseil scolaire acadien provincial.

After grade 4, students will continue their studies at École du Carrefour.
