= Merland =

Community in Nova Scotia, Canada

Coordinates: 45°34′37.78″N 61°40′13.98″W

Merland in Nova Scotia

Merland is a small community in the Canadian province of Nova Scotia, located in Antigonish County.

At one time named "Usher", changed by an Act of Parliament to its present name in 1868. It was first settled by the following Irish families: Dominic Daley, Thomas Coffey, Thomas Power, Michael Hogan and Patrick Dunn, about the end of the eighteenth century. It is said this place was named in honor of a former priest the Reverend James Merle. Merle is, the Scotch name for a black bird.
