= Ballantynes Cove =

- Unincorporated Community
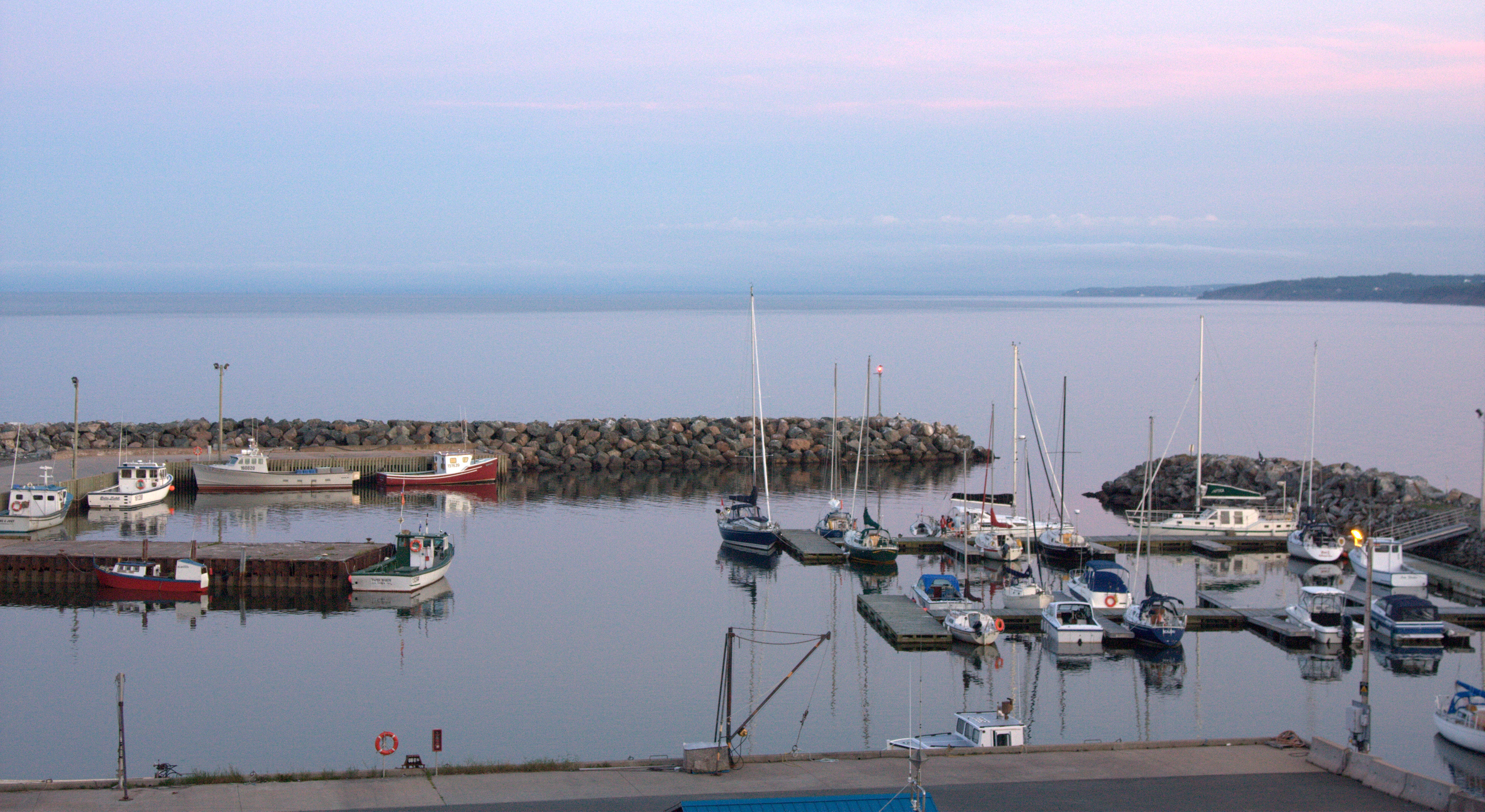
- Ballantyne's Cove Small Craft Harbour

- Location of Ballantynes Cove, Nova Scotia
- Coordinates: 45°51′35″N 61°55′15″W
- Country: Canada
- Province: Nova Scotia
- Municipality: Antigonish County
- Founded: 1810
- Time zone: UTC-4 (AST)
  - Summer (DST): UTC-3 (ADT)
- Canadian Postal code: B2G 2L2
- Area code: 902
- NTS Map: 011F13
- GNBC code: CABKW

Ballantyne's Cove is a community in Antigonish County, Nova Scotia, Canada, lying on a small cove of the same name at the north-western end of St. George's Bay.

The community and cove are named for one of its early settlers, David Ballantyne, a lowland Scotsman and British soldier who served in the 82nd regiment during the American Revolution and who received a grant for military service.

Ballantyne's Cove shelters a Small Craft Harbour, managed by the Harbour Authority of Ballantyne's Cove which is a principal trading point for Japanese merchants looking for sushi-grade Atlantic bluefin tuna. The harbour also hosts a 40 slip marina on floating docks with showers, washrooms, laundry facilities and fuel in addition to Ballantyne's Cove Bluefin Tuna Interpretive Centre as well as Ballantyne's Cove Beach. "Fish and Ships" (a take out restaurant) is located on-site as well.

Ballantyne's Cove, Cape George and Livingstone Cove encompass the area locally known as "The Cape."
