= Heatherton, Nova Scotia =

Community in Nova Scotia, Canada

Coordinates: 45°35′16.28″N 61°47′31.52″W

Heatherton in Nova Scotia

Heatherton (Bail’ a’ Fhraoich) is a small community in the Canadian province of Nova Scotia, located in Antigonish County. It has a Community centre, post office, and Catholic church. The local economy consists of farming, forestry, and fishing. Many people work in the town of Antigonish. It also has a group home and a community centre with a bakery. It is the home of the Heatherton Warriors Hockey Club who play in the Antigonish Rural Hockey League.
