= Port Hood Island, Nova Scotia =

Community in Nova Scotia, Canada

Coordinates: 46°00′26″N 61°34′14″W

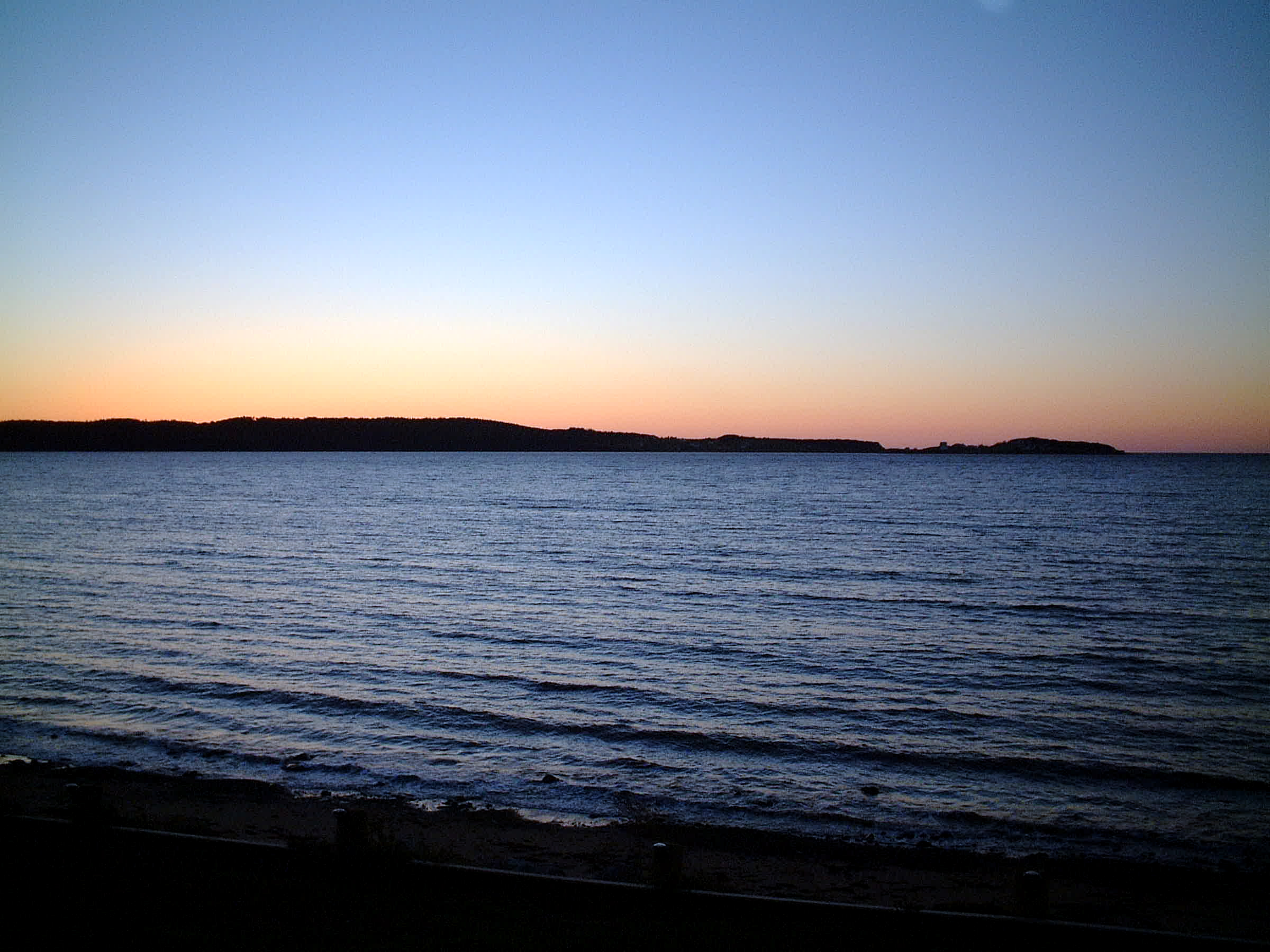
Port Hood Island at dusk

Port Hood Island is a small island and community of the same name located in the northeastern part of St. George's Bay, a sub-basin in the eastern part of the Northumberland Strait, adjacent to the west coast of Cape Breton Island, Nova Scotia, Canada. It is named after the community of Port Hood immediately to the east on Cape Breton Island. Before this name, the island was known as Smith Island.

Originally, Port Hood Island was connected to Cape Breton Island by a sand spit. It housed a booming lobster cannery, however, during a winter storm in the late 19th century, the thin sand spit connecting Port Hood Island was washed away. In the late 1950s, a road was constructed from the (then) main fishing wharf of the mainland to the fishing wharf on the island but it did not stand up to the weather and washed away shortly after completion. Rocks that made up the road still remain and now form what residents call the "Breakwater".

The island was originally settled by Protestant Loyalists, giving contrast to the Catholic majority in the Port Hood area. In the 1950s Port Hood Island had approximately 28 families, mostly fishermen and small lot farmers, along with a one-room school which handled grades 1-8/9, after which students boarded in Port Hood and attended Port Hood Academy. The island church enjoyed the services of the Port Hood minister who also served Mabou.

The Island is the subject of a song, "Lonely Island" written by Jimmy Rankin and featured on The Rankin Family's debut album. (1989).

Currently the island is mainly lived on during the summer months. There is only one permanent resident.

== Notable residents ==
- Sidney Earle Smith, former President of the University of Toronto and Secretary of State for External Affairs
