= Marydale, Nova Scotia =

Community in Nova Scotia, Canada

Coordinates: 45°31′35.6″N 61°49′59.21″W

Marydale in Nova Scotia

Marydale (Allt a’ Mheiligein) is a community in the Canadian province of Nova Scotia, located in Antigonish County.
