= Maryvale, Nova Scotia =

Human settlement in Nova Scotia, Canada

Maryvale is a small community in the Canadian province of Nova Scotia, located in Antigonish County. The name is derived from the local church, St. Mary's Parish and Vale, as in valley.
