= North Grant, Nova Scotia =

Community in Nova Scotia, Canada

Coordinates: 45°40′13.6″N 62°1′56.07″W

North Grant in Nova Scotia

North Grant is a small community in the Canadian province of Nova Scotia, located in Antigonish County.
