= Conseil scolaire acadien provincial =

School board in Nova Scotia, Canada

Address
- 9248 Route 1 Meteghan River Nova Scotia, B0W 2L0; Canada

District information
- Type: Francophone Public
- Grades: P-12 and Grandir en français
- Established: 1996
- Superintendent: Michel Collette
- School board: 18 trustees
- Chair of the board: Marcel Cottreau
- Schools: 23 schools and 19 pre-primary

Students and staff
- Students: 6,976 (as of September 30, 2025)

Other information
- Website: csap.ca

The Conseil scolaire acadien provincial (French for 'Acadian Provincial School Board'; CSAP) is the Francophone school board for the Canadian province of Nova Scotia. Established in 1996, CSAP is responsible for the governance and administration of French first-language public education for eligible rights-holders under Section 23 of the Canadian Charter of Rights and Freedoms. The board oversees 23 schools serving just under 7,000 students from pre-primary through Grade 12, including Grandir en français programming, and operates across the province to support Francophone and Acadian communities in urban, rural, and coastal regions.

== History ==
It was created in 1996 to meet the needs of Acadian and French language and education requirements in Nova Scotia.

CSAP is governed by an elected board of trustees who represent its constituent schools and electoral districts across Nova Scotia.

== Programming ==
CSAP schools offer French first-language instruction from pre-primary through Grade 12, following the Nova Scotia public school curriculum adapted for Francophone learners. The board also operates Grandir en français, a provincially funded pre-primary program designed to support early French-language development prior to entry into the public school system.

The CSAP plays a central role in the preservation and promotion of Acadian language and culture in Nova Scotia. In collaboration with community and cultural organizations, CSAP supports initiatives aimed at strengthening Francophone identity and ensuring the long-term vitality of Acadian communities within the province. CSAP emphasizes cultural and linguistic enrichment, including Acadian history, arts, and community engagement activities, as part of its mandate to support minority-language education.

== Enrolment ==
As of September 30, 2025, the Conseil scolaire acadien provincial reported a total enrollment of 6,976 students, from pre-primary through Grade 12, including students enrolled in Grandir en français pre-primary programming.

Enrollment is distributed across elementary, junior high, and senior high levels, with schools serving Francophone and Acadian communities in multiple regions of the province. Due to the geographic dispersion of these communities, individual schools often serve large catchment areas.

== Schools ==
The following schools are operated by the Conseil scolaire acadien provincial.

=== Antigonish County ===
- École acadienne de Pomquet (pr to 12); Pomquet

=== Cape Breton County ===
- Centre scolaire Étoile de l'Acadie (pr to 12); Sydney

=== Colchester County ===
- École acadienne de Truro (pr to 12); Truro

=== Digby County ===
- École Joseph-Dugas (pr to 6); Pointe-de-l'Église
- École secondaire de Clare (7 to 12); Rivière-Meteghan
- École Stella-Maris (pr to 6); Meteghan

=== Guysborough County ===
- École Belle-Baie (pr to 9); Larrys River

=== Halifax County ===
- École Bois-Joli (pr to 4); Dartmouth
- École du Carrefour (5 to 8); Dartmouth
- École secondaire Mosaïque (9 to 12); Burnside, Nova Scotia
- École des Beaux-Marais (pr to 8); Porters Lake
- École secondaire du Sommet (6 to 12); Halifax
- École Beaubassin (pr to 5); Halifax
- École du Grand-Portage (pr to 7); Lower Sackville
- École Mer et Monde (pr to 6); Halifax

=== Inverness County ===
- École NDA (pr to 12); Chéticamp

=== Kings County ===
- École Rose-des-Vents (pr to 12); Greenwood

=== Lunenburg County ===
- Centre Scolaire de la Rive-Sud (pr to 12); Cookville

=== Richmond County ===
- École Beau-Port (pr to 12); Arichat

=== Yarmouth County ===
- École Belleville (pr to 6); Tusket
- École Pubnico-Ouest (pr to 6); Pubnico-Ouest
- École secondaire de Par-en-Bas (7 to 12); Tusket
- École Wedgeport (pr to 6); Wedgeport

== See also ==
- List of Nova Scotia schools
- Nova Scotia Department of Education
