= Cape Jack =

Community in Nova Scotia, Canada

Coordinates: 45°40′59.11″N 61°34′1.66″W

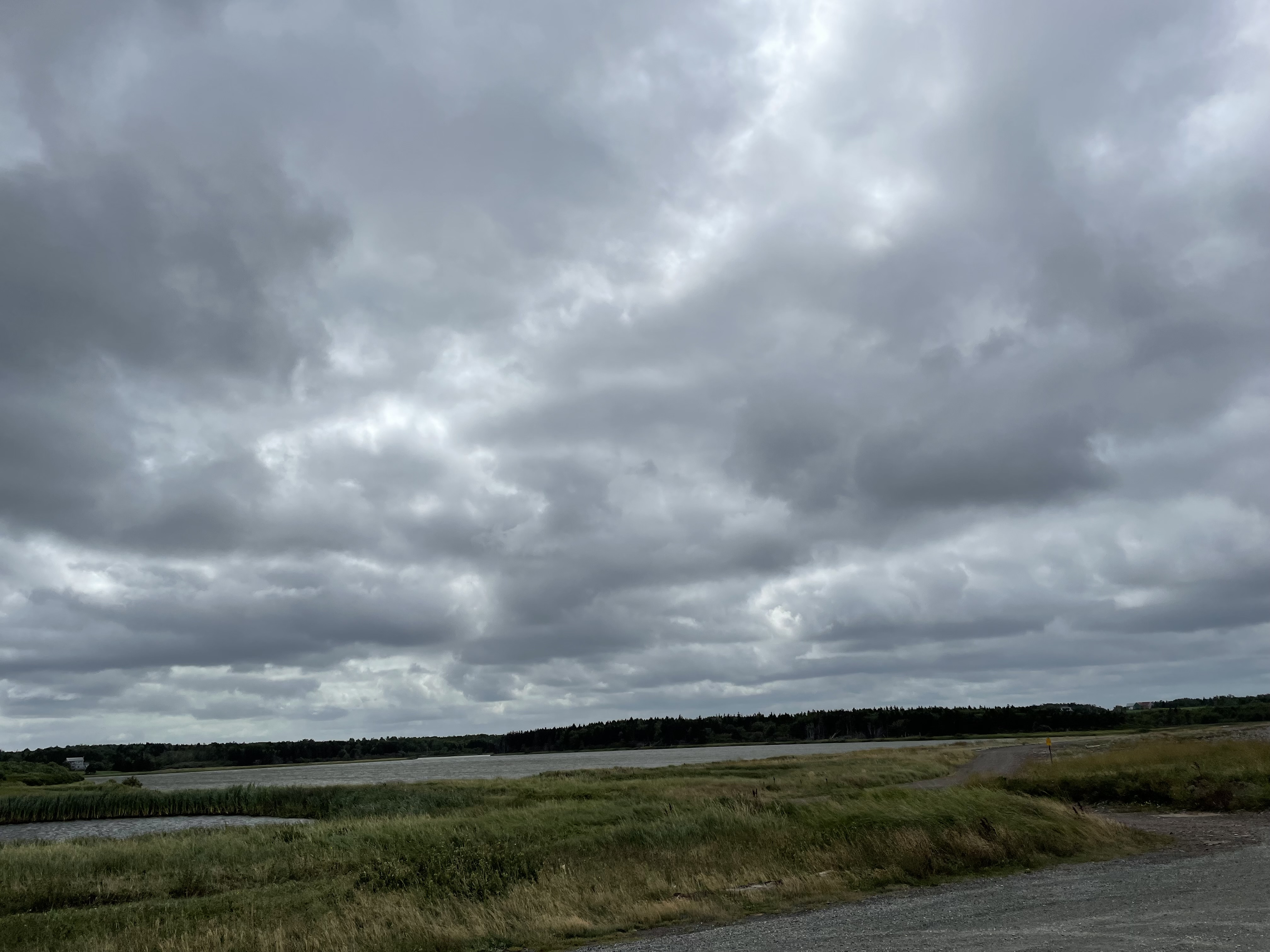
Cape Pond in Cape Jack

Cape Jack in Nova Scotia

Cape Jack is a community in the Canadian province of Nova Scotia, located in Antigonish County. Among the early settlers in Cape Jack were families by the names of Breen, Brow, Carpenter, Chisholm, Cormier, Corbet, DeCoste, and Irwin. Cape Jack had a population of 159 people in 1956.
