= Henry Island (Nova Scotia) =

Island in Nova Scotia, Canada

Coordinates: 45°58′52.9″N 61°35′53″W

Henry Island is an island located in the Gulf of Saint Lawrence in the Northumberland Strait of Nova Scotia, Canada, just east of Prince Edward Island and southwest of Port Hood Island.

== Geography ==
Consisting of 150 acres (0.61 km^{2}) of mostly forested tract, the 2½ mile long by 1-mile (1.6 km) wide island has up to 100-foot (30 m) cliffs along the west shore, and beaches of shallow shoals along the east shore. The water along the west shore reaches depths of up to 80 feet (24 m). There are no year-round residents. Privately owned, the family inhabits the island in the summer.

== History ==
Early nautical charts refer to the island as Iles aux Jestico or Juste-au-Corps, the previous county name of the current-day Inverness County, Nova Scotia. There is some debate over the origin of the current name, Henry. One theory has it that the island was named for Henry Hood, son of Admiral Samuel Hood, commander-in-chief of the Royal Navy of North America in the late 18th century. Others think it may have been named for Prince William Henry, the uncle of Queen Victoria.

The first person known to have settled the island was James Campbell during the 18th century. By this time an area of great maritime activity, a lighthouse existed on the summit as early as 1854. During the period of the Canadian–American Reciprocity Treaty which was in effect from 1854 to 1866, fishermen set up temporary camps each summer on Henry Island. Soon after the treaty expired the area was overcome by economic depression. Nearly 30 years later, the original lighthouse was replaced with the currently standing 53-foot (16 m) red and white lighthouse in 1902 under the supervision of foreman Jim MacDonnell of Margaree Harbor, Nova Scotia for a total cost of $3,489. The current lighthouse remains the property of the Canadian Coast Guard. An adjacent house had also been constructed in 1901. This new lighthouse had been a campaign promise of Parliament member Angus MacLennan, M.D. The first three lighthouse keepers were relatives and descendants of MacLennan: John MacLennan from 1901, Daniel MacLennan, starting in 1907, and Charles MacLennan, the father of a local shopkeeper, Sadie Murphy. The last known keeper before the lighthouse was automated was Sterling Morrison, who became keeper in 1961 for a very brief period. By 1992, the adjacent house had not been lived in for 40 years and had been vandalized, and a nearby shed destroyed. The island was purchased by William F. Baker, who undertook the restoration of the home back to its original state.

== Transportation ==
Henry Island is accessible for day tours around the periphery and walking tours to the lighthouse via boat through Port Hood Island Views Boat Tours.
