= École du Carrefour =

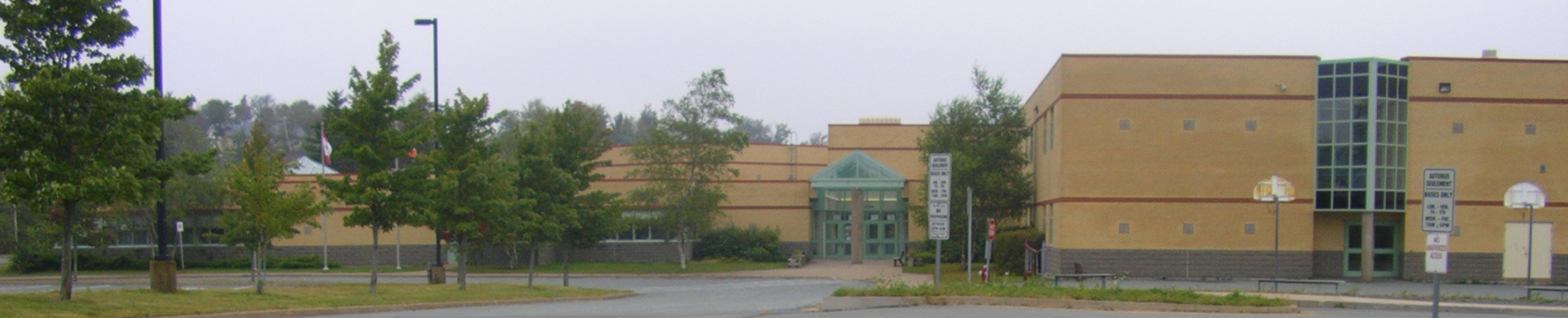

Location
- 201A avenue du Portage; Dartmouth, Nova Scotia, B2X 3T4; Canada
- Coordinates: 44°42′19.3″N 63°31′58.2″W

Information
- School type: Middle School
- Founded: 1991
- School board: Conseil scolaire acadien provincial
- Principal: Malou Déry
- Grades: 4-8
- Enrollment: 529 (September 2020)
- Language: French
- Colours: Purple, White, Black and Silver
- Mascot: Leopard
- Website: carrefour.ednet.ns.ca
- Last updated: February, 2020

École du Carrefour is a Canadian francophone public school in Dartmouth, Nova Scotia for students in grades 4 through 8. It is operated by the Conseil scolaire acadien provincial (CSAP). It is located in the same building as the French community centre, Conseil Communautaire du Grand Havre. École du Carrefour's mascot is a leopard and the school colours are grey and purple.

== History ==
École du Carrefour du Grand-Havre opened in 1991. It took ten years of negotiations in order for them to achieve their vision as a French-only school as it exists today. In its first year after being opened, École du Carrefour consisted of 120 students.

Originally, the French school was attended by students from grade primary to grade 12. After the number of students was too populous for the school to support, two elementary schools (Grades primary to 6) were built. These schools were École Bois-Joli in Dartmouth, Nova Scotia and École Beaubassin in Bedford. École du Carrefour remained a high school for several years until the creation of École secondaire Mosaïque in 2020.

== Student government ==
École du Carrefour has a student government called the CJÉ (Conseil Jeunesse Étudiant). Historically, this body was composed of 10 people in total: a president, four vice presidents, a representative from grade 7, a representative from grade 8, a representative from grade 9, a secretary, and a treasurer. One or many members of the teaching staff play a role as monitoring agent of the CJÉ. In order to apply for positions on the board, the Presidents and secretary must hold a minimum 75% average in French, while the treasurer must have a minimum of 75% in mathematics. All other members require an average of 70% or higher.
