= Salt Springs, Antigonish County =

Community in Nova Scotia, Canada

Coordinates: 45°35′28.6″N 62°0′6.07″W

Salt Springs in Nova Scotia

Salt Springs is a small community in the Canadian province of Nova Scotia, located in Antigonish County.
