= McArras Brook =

Community in Nova Scotia, Canada

Coordinates: 45°43′45.52″N 62°12′22.09″W

McArras Brook in Nova Scotia

McArras Brook (Scottish Gaelic: Allt Mhic Àra) is a small community in the Canadian province of Nova Scotia, located in Antigonish County. It is named for its original settler, James McCara from Perthshire, Scotland.
