= Glen Alpine, Nova Scotia =

Community in Nova Scotia, Canada

Coordinates: 45°29′5.74″N 62°0′14.72″W

Glen Alpine in Nova Scotia

Glen Alpine (An Gleann Ailpein) is a small community in the Canadian province of Nova Scotia, located in Antigonish County.
