= Lower Barneys River, Nova Scotia =

Community in Nova Scotia, Canada

Coordinates: 45°39′54.6″N 62°20′53.16″W

Lower Barney's River in Nova Scotia

Lower Barneys River (2012 population: 250) is a small community in the Canadian province of Nova Scotia, located in Pictou County. Lower Barneys River is named after being the lower part of the large river called "Barneys River".
