= St. Joseph, Antigonish County =

Community in Nova Scotia, Canada

Coordinates: 45°32′19.54″N 62°4′39.37″W

St. Joseph in Nova Scotia

St. Joseph is a community in the Canadian province of Nova Scotia, located in Antigonish County.
