= North Lochaber, Nova Scotia =

Community in Nova Scotia, Canada

Coordinates: 45°26′59.19″N 62°0′49.33″W

North Lochaber in Nova Scotia

North Lochaber is a small community in the Canadian province of Nova Scotia, located in Antigonish County. It is north of Lochaber on Nova Scotia Trunk 7 at the northern end of Lochaber Lake.
