= Georgeville, Nova Scotia =

Community in Nova Scotia, Canada

Coordinates: 45°49′19.35″N 62°1′47.73″W

Georgeville in Nova Scotia

Georgeville (Scottish Gaelic: Baile Sheòrais) is a community on Cape George in Antigonish County, Nova Scotia, Canada.

St. George's Church is a two-storey, Gothic Revival Roman Catholic Church built between 1860 and 1871. It is a municipally designated heritage property valued for its association with the history of Roman Catholic settlement in the area. A small chapel built in 1830 at Morar, some 4 km (2.5 mi) away, was hauled to the site and now serves as a vestry for the church.
