= Lochaber, Nova Scotia =

Community in Nova Scotia, Canada

Lochaber in Nova Scotia

Lochaber (Scottish Gaelic: Loch Abar) is a small community in the Canadian province of Nova Scotia, located in Antigonish County. Today it is known for its strawberries, and its annual Strawberry Festival. The community was named after Lochaber, a mountainous area of Inverness-shire, in Scotland, from where came the first settlers. It was first settled in 1810 by European settlers.

== Lochaber Community Renewal Project ==
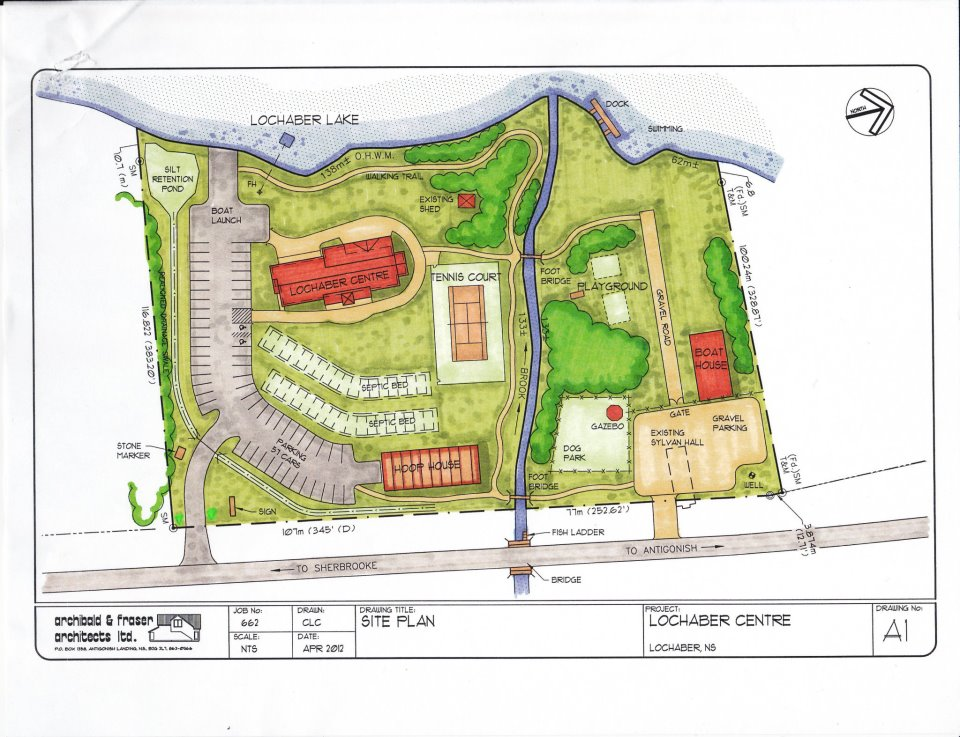
Lochaber Centre Site Plan

In September 2011, the Lochaber Community Development Association held a public meeting to discuss the building of a new Lochaber Centre, to replace the existing Sylvan Hall. Fundraising for the Lochaber Centre began that month, and eventually raised $350,000. In October 2012, the Canadian Federal Government announced funding of $506,600, the Municipality of Antigonish pledged $75,000, as well.

The Lochaber Centre will include a tennis court/hockey rink, parking for 51 cars, and, in the future, a boat house for the Antigonish and St.FX Rowing Clubs. The Lochaber Centre will be a large player in Rowing, as they are hoping to host many events, being the only straight 2 kilometer course, east of Montreal. The centre opened in Spring 2014. In July 2014, Lochaber hosted the CanAmMex international rowing regatta.
