= Dunmaglass, Nova Scotia =

Community in Nova Scotia, Canada

Coordinates: 45.700073°N 62.199298°W

Dunmaglass in Nova Scotia

Dunmaglass (Dun Mac-glais) is a locality in the Canadian province of Nova Scotia, located in Antigonish County. Formerly a small community, the use of the name as such was rescinded in 1976. Formerly known as both "back settlement of Knoydart" and "Summerville", it was officially named in 1879 after Dunmaglass, Scotland, the home of its first settlers.
