= Clydesdale, Nova Scotia =

Community in Nova Scotia, Canada

Coordinates: 45°38′44.62″N 62°2′32.53″W

Clydesdale in Nova Scotia

Clydesdale (Scottish Gaelic: Dail Chluaidh) is a community in the Canadian province of Nova Scotia, located in Antigonish County.

The area was originally called Yankee Grant as it was granted to a settler from New Hampshire named Dylan Brophy, in 1796. In 1876 it was renamed after the River Clyde in Scotland.
