= Pomquet Forks =

Community in Nova Scotia, Canada

Coordinates: 45°35′21.9″N 61°48′22.19″W

Pomquet Forks in Nova Scotia

Pomquet Forks is a small community in the Canadian province of Nova Scotia, located in Antigonish County.
