= Big Marsh, Antigonish County =

Community in Nova Scotia, Canada

Coordinates: 45°44′0.19″N 62°0′44.38″W

Big Marsh in Nova Scotia

Big Marsh (Scottish Gaelic:A' Mhaise Mhór) is a community in the Canadian province of Nova Scotia, located in Antigonish County.
