= Greenwold, Nova Scotia =

Community in Nova Scotia, Canada

Coordinates: 45°37′1.77″N 61°57′40.84″W

Greenwold in Nova Scotia

Greenwold is a small community in the Canadian province of Nova Scotia, located in Antigonish County.
