= Havre Boucher =

Community in Nova Scotia, Canada

- Unincorporated community
- Location of Havre Boucher, Nova Scotia
- Coordinates: 45°39′0″N 61°31′0″W
- Country: Canada
- Province: Nova Scotia
- Municipality: Antigonish County

Area
  - Total: 2.69 km^{2} (1.04 sq mi)
- Highest elevation: 74 m (243 ft)
- Lowest elevation: 0 m (0 ft)

Population (2021)
  - Total: 281
  - Density: 104/km^{2} (271/sq mi)
- Time zone: UTC−4 (AST)
  - Summer (DST): UTC−3 (ADT)
- Canadian Postal Code: B0H 1P0
- Area code: 902
- Telephone Exchange: 234
- NTS Map: 11F12 Antigonish
- GNBC Code: CAPVL
- Website: havreboucher.com

Havre Boucher /ˈhævər ˈbuːʃi/ is a community in Antigonish County, Nova Scotia, Canada.

== Description ==
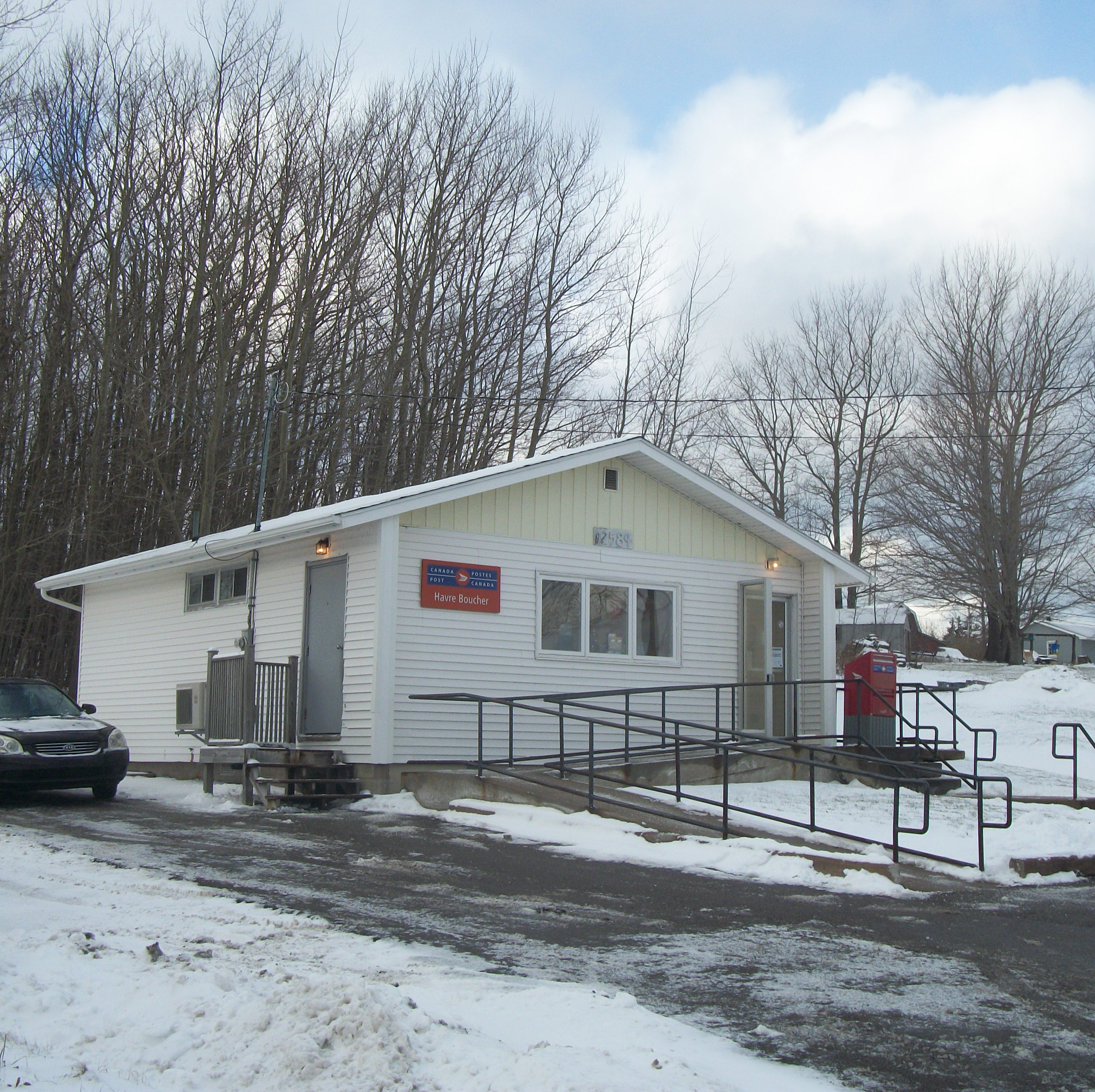
Havre Boucher post office

The village takes its name from "Havre Boucher", a natural harbour that opens onto St. George's Bay to the north. The community has expanded from its original setting on the west side of the harbour to now encompass the communities of Auld's Cove, Cape Jack, East Havre Boucher, West Havre Boucher, Frankville and Linwood.

Havre Boucher is largely rural and dependent upon the fishing industry, and as a service centre for the surrounding area.

Formerly an incorporated village, offering its residents political control through an elected governing body known as a "village commission" which operated under the auspices of the Nova Scotia Municipal Services Act, its status was dissolved in 2018.

== History ==
Construction of the Canso Causeway, which opened in 1955, saw the Canadian National Railway mainline from Truro-Sydney being diverted from Linwood to an alignment north through Havre Boucher and Cape Jack, following the Strait of Canso to the causeway. Prior to that time, the railway ran from Linwood to Mulgrave where a ferry service operated to Point Tupper. Havre Boucher saw the construction of a large railway yard, which remains in operation today by the Cape Breton and Central Nova Scotia Railway.

== Demographics ==
In the 2021 Census of Population conducted by Statistics Canada, Havre Boucher had a population of 281 living in 128 of its 137 total private dwellings, a change of −9.1% from its 2016 population of 309. With a land area of 2.69 km^{2} (1.04 sq mi), it had a population density of 104.5/km^{2} (270.6/sq mi) in 2021.
