= Lakevale =

Community in Nova Scotia, Canada

Coordinates: 45°47′2.13″N 61°55′8.82″W

Lakevale in Nova Scotia

Lakevale (Scottish Gaelic: Gleann a’ Loch) is a community in the Canadian province of Nova Scotia, located in Antigonish County.
