= Morar, Nova Scotia =

Locality in Nova Scotia, Canada

Coordinates: 45°50′53.42″N 61°59′33.47″W

Morar in Nova Scotia

Morar (Mòrar) is a locality in the Canadian province of Nova Scotia, located in Antigonish County. Formerly known as North Side Cape George, the area was given its present name by an Act of Parliament in the year 1888. It is named after a county on the western coast of Scotland.
