= Livingstone Cove =

Community in Nova Scotia, Canada

Coordinates: 45°51′59.7″N 61°58′21.01″W

Livingstone Cove in Nova Scotia

Livingstone Cove is a community in the Canadian province of Nova Scotia, located in Antigonish County. This place received its name after its first settler, a Malcolm Livingstone, who settled there about the year 1800.
