= Southside Antigonish Harbour =

Community in Nova Scotia, Canada

Coordinates: 45°40′4.96″N 61°52′41.12″W

Southside Antigonish Harbour in Nova Scotia

Southside Antigonish Harbour is a community in the Canadian province of Nova Scotia, located in Antigonish County.
