= Linwood, Nova Scotia =

Community in Nova Scotia, Canada

Coordinates: 45°39′3.2″N 61°34′28.07″W

Linwood in Nova Scotia

Linwood is a community in the Canadian province of Nova Scotia, located in Antigonish County. It was named by an act of parliament in 1884.

Linwood is a small coastal community located halfway between the town of Antigonish and the Canso Causeway. Located around Linwood Harbour, Linwood has two campgrounds, both with a view of the harbour, along with a short hiking trail, picnic park, ice rink (in winter) and a community centre.
