= Doctors Brook =

Community in Nova Scotia, Canada

Coordinates: 45°46′19.25″N 62°8′11.18″W

Doctors Brook in Nova Scotia

Doctors Brook (Canadian Gaelic: Allt an Doctair) is a small community in the Canadian province of Nova Scotia, located in Antigonish County. It is on Nova Scotia Route 245. It was named for Dr. Alexander MacDonald, the first medical doctor in Antigonish County.
