= Antigonish Harbour =

Community in Nova Scotia, Canada

Coordinates: 45°43′2.38″N 61°54′26.18″W

Antigonish Harbour in Nova Scotia

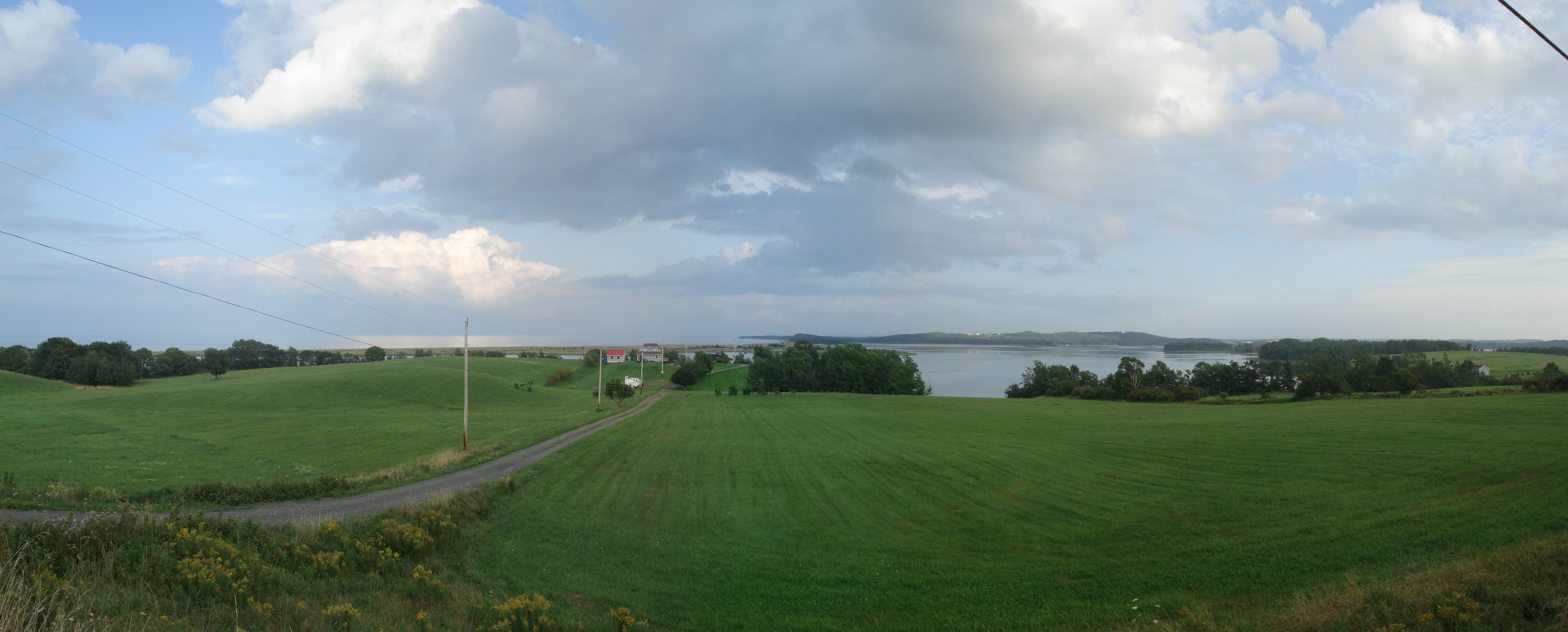
Antigonish Harbour

Antigonish Harbour is a community and harbour in the Canadian province of Nova Scotia, located in Antigonish County, first settled in 1784 by disbanded soldiers loyal to the British side in the American Revolution.
