= Morristown, Antigonish County =

Community in Nova Scotia, Canada

Coordinates: 45°44′17.98″N 61°53′43.54″W

Morristown in Nova Scotia

Morristown (Baile Mhoirein) is a community in the Canadian province of Nova Scotia, located in Antigonish County. It was established as a township in 1856.
