= Cape George, Nova Scotia =

Cape in Nova Scotia, Canada

Coordinates: 45°49′51.86″N 61°55′34.16″W

Cape George in Nova Scotia

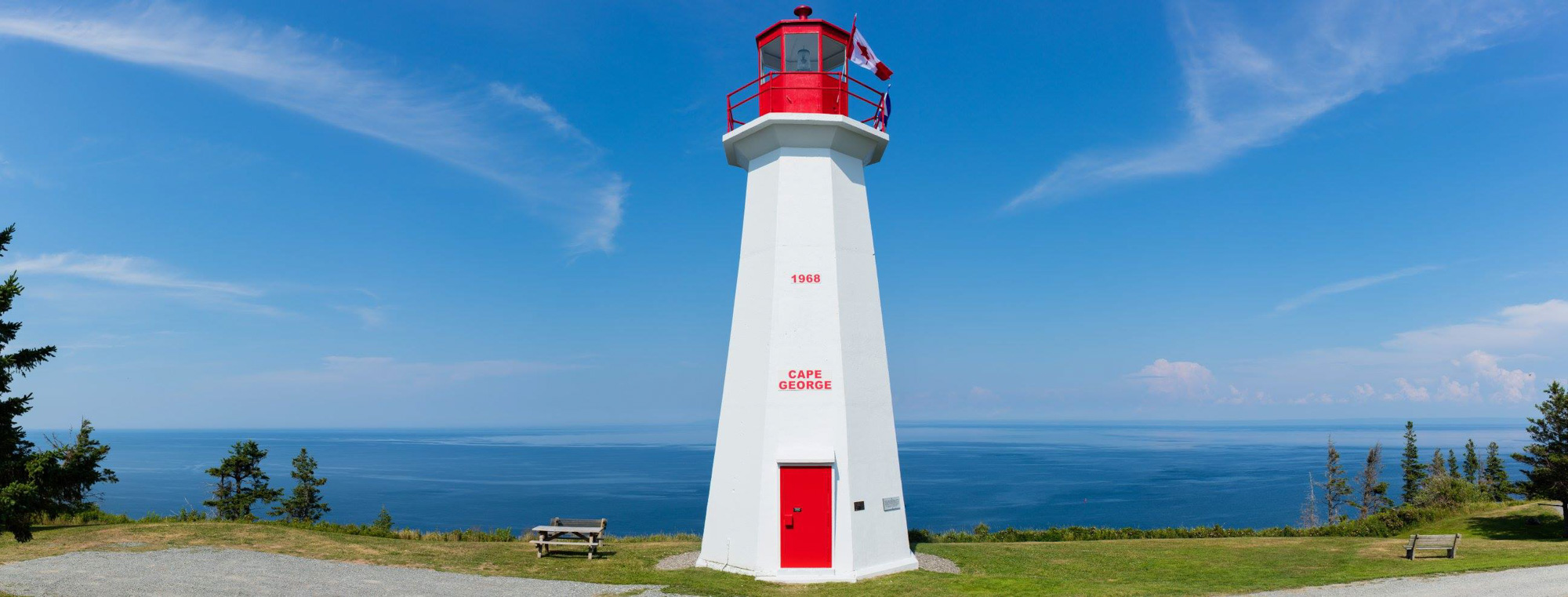
Cape George Point Lighthouse

Cape George (Scottish Gaelic: Ceap Sheòrais) is a cape in Antigonish County, Nova Scotia. It defines the northwestern limit of St. George's Bay. The communities of Cape George, Cape George Point, Morar, and Livingstone Cove are situated on the cape.

The cape was named Cap St. Louis by the French. Joseph Frederick Wallet DesBarres then, in 1781, named the geographical feature George and St. George, after King George II, but, keeping the saint from the older French name. The original British grantees and settlers were of Scottish origin, many soldiers in the American Revolutionary War.

It is a large hub for the Nova Scotia lobster and tuna fishing industry.

== See also ==
- Royal eponyms in Canada
