= Malignant Cove, Nova Scotia =

Community in Nova Scotia, Canada

Coordinates: 45°47′2.24″N 62°4′53.74″W

Malignant Cove in Nova Scotia

Malignant Cove is a small community in the Canadian province of Nova Scotia, located in Antigonish County. It was named for the sailing vessel Malignant, which ran aground there during the American Revolution. It was renamed Milburn in 1915 but the new name was not adopted by the community. The founder of The Casket, John Boyd, began as a printer in Malignant Cove.
