= Antigonish, Nova Scotia =

Antigonish Gaelic: Am Baile Mòr
- Town
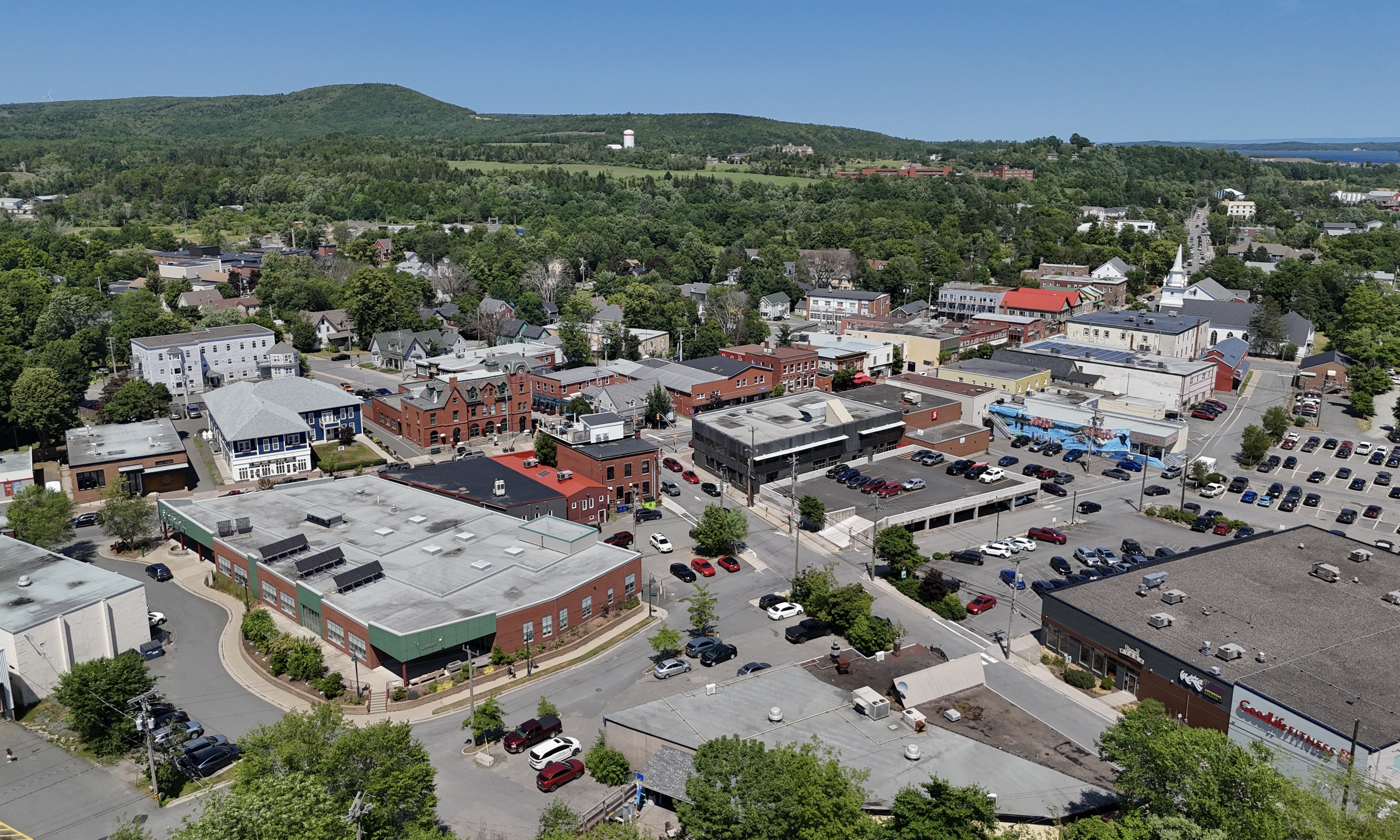
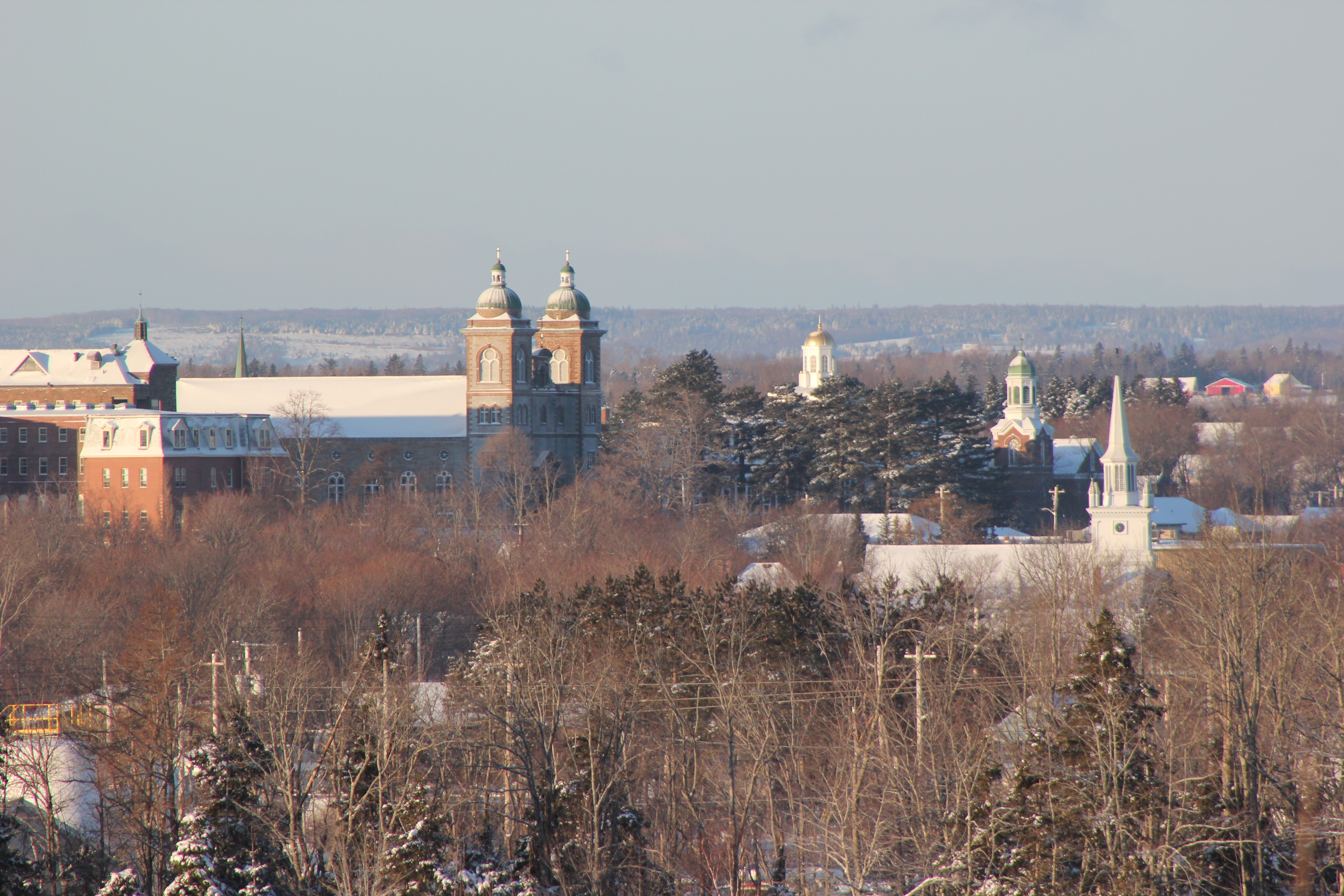
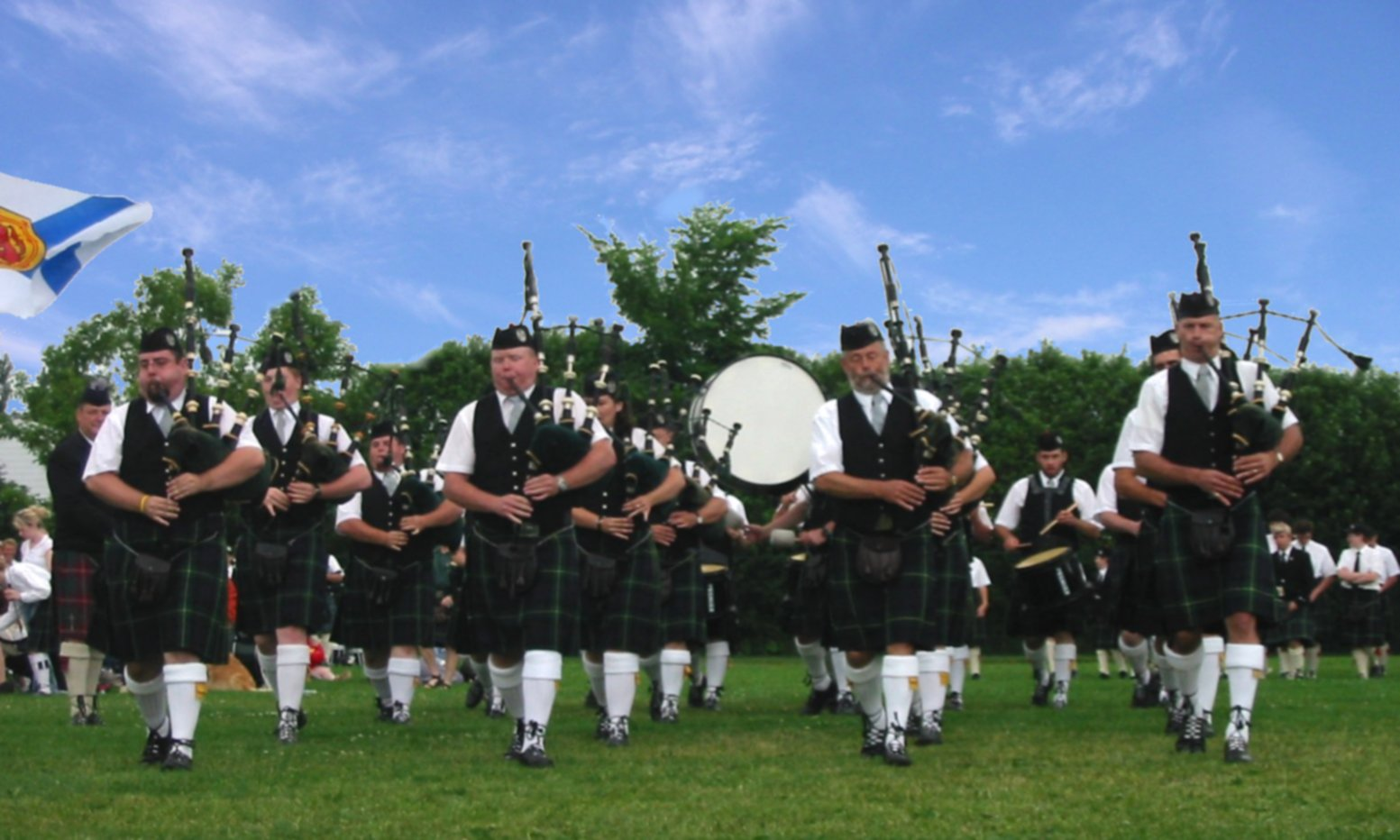
- Downtown Antigonish St. Francis Xavier University Antigonish Highland Games

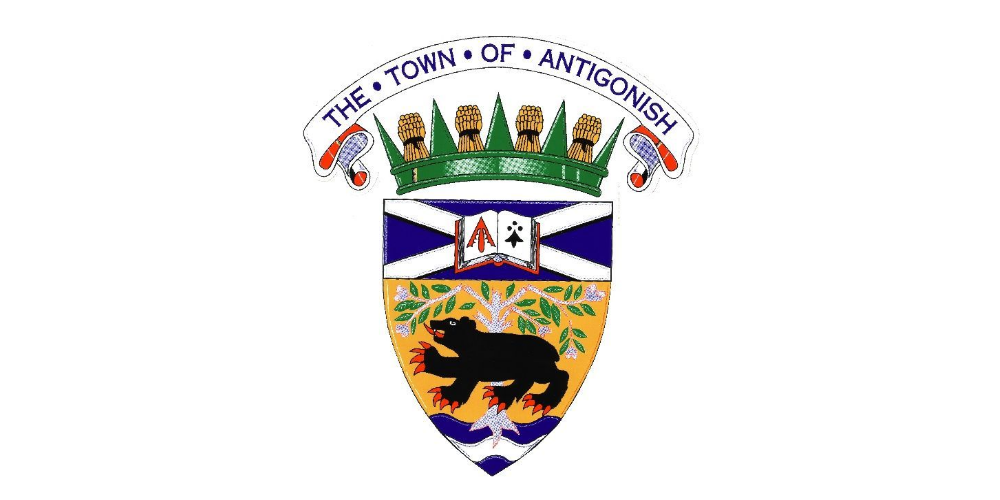
- Flag Seal Coat of arms

- Location of Antigonish in Nova Scotia
- Coordinates: 45°37′22″N 61°59′30″W
- Country: Canada
- Province: Nova Scotia
- County: Antigonish County
- Founded: 1784
- Incorporated: January 9, 1889

Government
  - Type: Town Council
  - Mayor: Sean Cameron
  - Governing Body: Antigonish Town Council
  - MLA: Michelle Thompson (Progressive Conservative)
  - MP: Sean Fraser (L)

Area (2021)
  - Town: 4.98 km^{2} (1.92 sq mi)
  - Urban: 5.88 km^{2} (2.27 sq mi)
- Highest elevation: 34 m (112 ft)
- Lowest elevation: 0 m (0 ft)

Population (2021)
  - Town: 4,656
  - Density: 934.5/km^{2} (2,420/sq mi)
  - Urban: 5,620
  - Urban density: 955.7/km^{2} (2,475/sq mi)
- Demonym: Antigonisher
- Time zone: UTC-4 (AST)
  - Summer (DST): UTC-3 (ADT)
- Canadian Postal code: B2G
- Area code: 902
- Telephone Exchanges: 318 338 604 735 863 867 870 872 908 948 968 971 995
- Median household income, 2020 (all households): $54,800
- NTS Map: 011F12
- GNBC Code: CAATB
- Website: www.townofantigonish.ca

Assumed arms of Antigonish

Antigonish (/ˌæntɪɡəˈnɪʃ/ AN-tig-ə-NISH; Canadian Gaelic: Am Baile Mòr [am ˈpalə ˈmuːɾ]) is a town in Antigonish County, Nova Scotia, Canada. The town is home to St. Francis Xavier University and the oldest continuous Highland games outside Scotland. It is approximately 160 kilometres (100 miles) northeast of Halifax, the provincial capital.

== History ==
Antigonish had been the location of an annual Mi'kmaq summer coastal community prior to European settlement. The original definition of the name has been lost as the Mi'kmaq language has undergone many revisions over the last two centuries. The first European settlement took place in 1784 when Lt. Colonel Timothy Hierlihy of the Royal Nova Scotia Volunteer Regiment received a large land grant surrounding Antigonish Harbour. Hierlihy and his party founded the Dorchester settlement, named for Sir Guy Carleton, who was Governor General of Canada and subsequently Lord Dorchester. Shortly after, Sgt Nathan Pushee of the Duke of Cumberland's Regiment settled at Chedabucto (present-day Guysborough), eventually establishing present-day Amherst, Nova Scotia. In 1796 another settler named Zephaniah Williams (of which Williams Point just outside of town was named after), with the assistance of a First Nations guide, blazed a trail from Antigonish Harbour to Brown's Mountain, using the shortest route. This trail became a guide for travellers and eventually evolved into a winding Main Street. By the late 1820s, Dorchester was commonly referred to as Antigonish. In 1852, a newspaper, The Casket, began publication. It was purchased by Bounty Print in 2015.

St. Francis Xavier University was established in Antigonish in 1855, having been founded in 1853 in Arichat on Cape Breton Island and originally called the College of East Bay after East Bay, Nova Scotia, where an earlier institution had once existed (1824–1829). St.F.X. was originally a Catholic seminary and was granted full university powers in 1866 by an act of the Nova Scotia House of Assembly. The town is also the episcopal seat of the Roman Catholic Diocese of Antigonish.

The first hospital in Antigonish opened on June 10, 1906.

Antigonish is notable for having a social movement named for it, the Antigonish Movement, launched from St. Francis Xavier University in the 1920s by local priests and educators including Moses Coady and Jimmy Tompkins.

== Demographics ==
Historical populations
Year	Pop.	±%
1901	1,838	—
1911	1,787	−2.8%
1921	1,746	−2.3%
1931	1,784	+2.2%
1941	2,157	+20.9%
1951	3,196	+48.2%
1956	3,592	+12.4%
1961	4,344	+20.9%
1981	5,205	+19.8%
1986	5,291	+1.7%
1991	4,924	−6.9%
1996	4,860	−1.3%
2001	4,754	−2.2%
2006	4,236	−10.9%
2011	4,524	+6.8%
2016	4,364	−3.5%
2021	4,656	+6.7%

In the 2021 Census of Population conducted by Statistics Canada, Antigonish had a population of 4,656 living in 2,205 of its 2,675 total private dwellings, a change of 6.7% from its 2016 population of 4,364. With a land area of 4.98 km^{2} (1.92 sq mi), it had a population density of 934.9/km^{2} (2,421.5/sq mi) in 2021.

== Economy ==
Antigonish is a service centre for the surrounding region that includes Antigonish and Guysborough Counties and many local businesses are based in the service sector. There are no major industrial operations located in the town or county. The workforce is primarily white collar with the largest employers being St. Martha's Regional Hospital and St. Francis Xavier University. Until 2011, Antigonish accommodated Canada Post's National Philatelic Centre, which provided mail-order services for worldwide collectors of Canadian stamps.

=== Highway 104 Twinning ===
In 2005, the provincial government approved the twinning of Highway 104 from Addington Forks Road easterly 15 kilometres (9.3 mi) to Taylor's Road. In 2017, the provincial government announced that a further 38 kilometres (24 mi) from Sutherlands River to Antigonish would be twinned, thus creating an uninterrupted four-lane highway network from Halifax to Antigonish. The finished twinned highway was opened in July 2023.

=== 2004–07 retail building boom ===
The Antigonish area experienced great deal of economic growth and retail development between 2004 and 2007 when the retail landscape of the town and county changed significantly. Much of the growth took place in the Post Road area, just outside town.

Other areas also saw growth. A multi-unit retail annex was constructed at the local shopping mall in the spring of 2006. This complex houses a new sporting goods store, and other businesses and services. The mall area also saw the construction of restaurants which opened in late 2006 and in February 2007.

== Education ==
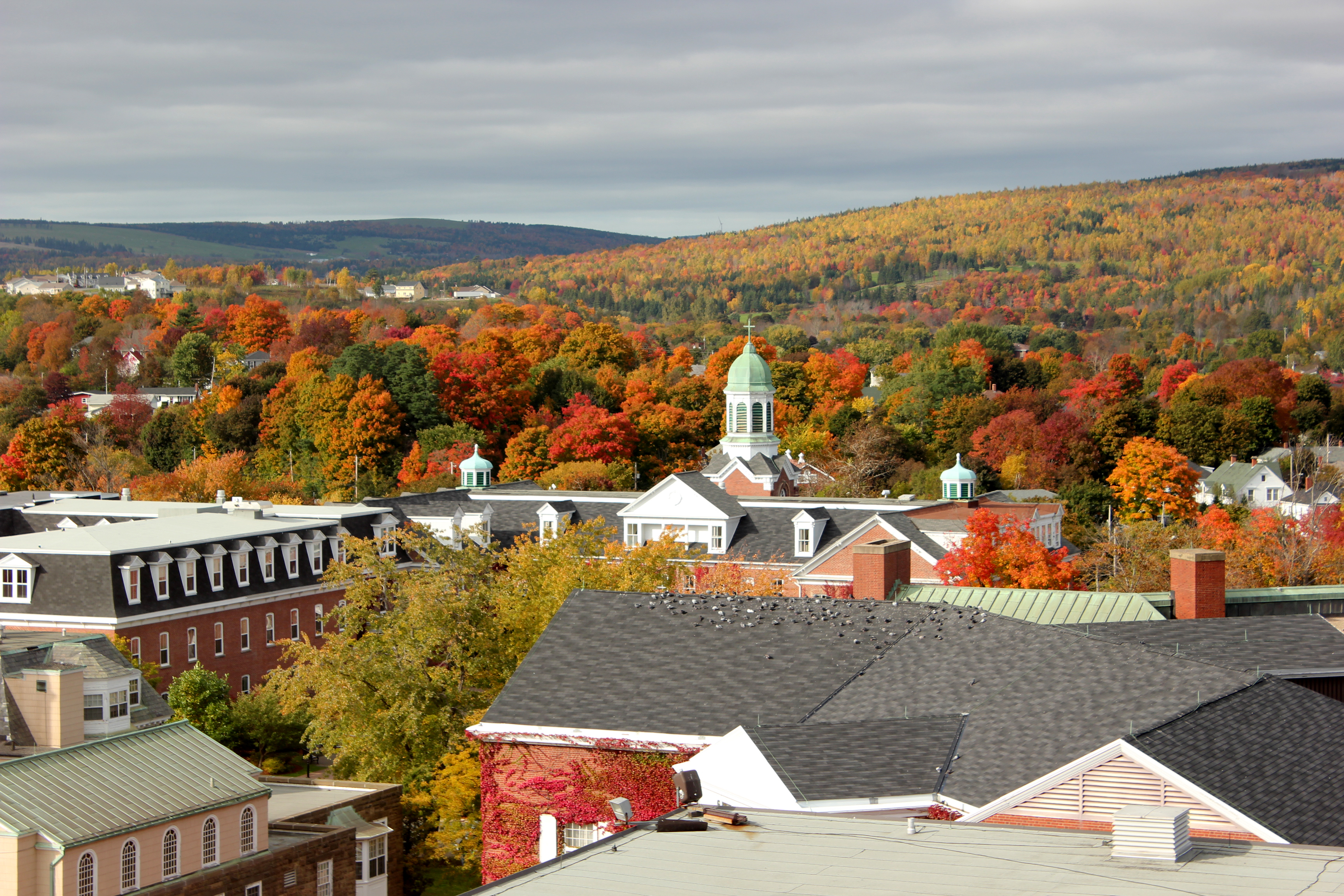
St. Francis Xavier University

St. Francis Xavier University is located in Antigonish. Established in 1853, St. Francis Xavier has 4,267 full-time students and 500 part-time students. It was named as the best primarily undergraduate university in Canada by Maclean's magazine for five consecutive years (2002–2006). St. Francis Xavier is also well known for the X-Ring and the Coady International Institute.

The elementary and secondary schools in Antigonish fall under the jurisdiction of the Strait Regional School Board. Antigonish is home to three public schools: Dr. John Hugh Gillis Regional High School, St. Andrew Junior School and the Antigonish Education Centre.

== Sports and culture ==
The annual Antigonish Highland Games have been held since 1863. The first games were held to raise funds for the construction of St. Ninian's Cathedral.

Year-round, the town has access to professional and community theatre through the Bauer Theatre on the StFX Campus. It is home to Festival Antigonish Summer Theatre and Theatre Antigonish.

== Notable residents ==
- Donald Chisholm, stockcar driver
- Mary-Colin Chisholm, stage, film and TV actor
- William Chisholm (b.c. 1778 – 1851), Roman Catholic priest from Scotland, first bishop of what is now the diocese of Antigonish
- Moses Coady, Catholic priest, adult educator, and leader of the Antigonish Movement
- Mark Day, film and TV actor
- Sean Fraser (politician) (born 1984), politician and the current minister of justice and Attorney General of Canada
- Bill Gillis, member of the Nova Scotia House of Assembly from 1970 to 1998
- Eric Gillis, 2008, 2012, 2016 Olympian (athletics – 10,000 m, marathon)
- Captain Nichola Goddard, MSM, fallen Canadian soldier
- Chelsey Gotell, paralympic swimmer
- Max Haines, crime writer, columnist for the Toronto Sun
- Larry Lamb, English actor
- Edward Langille, university professor
- Allan The Ridge MacDonald (c. 1794 – 1868), poet from Lochaber and pioneer homesteader in both Cape Breton and Antigonish County.
- Craig MacDonald, former professional hockey player
- Garfield MacDonald, Olympic Athlete
- Shauna MacDonald, actress, also known as "Promo Girl" on CBC Radio One
- Allan MacEachen, Liberal MP, cabinet minister, Senator
- Ryan MacGrath, musician and painter
- Al MacIsaac, Vice President Chicago Blackhawks
- Paul MacLean, former head coach of the Ottawa Senators and former assistant coach of the Toronto Maple Leafs
- Carole MacNeil, television journalist
- Stephen McHattie, stage, film and TV actor
- Robyn Meagher, Olympic runner
- Carroll Morgan, Olympic heavyweight boxer
- Archbishop James Morrison, Catholic Bishop 1912
- Aleixo Muise, medical researcher and physician
- Sara Peters, writer
- Sandy Silver, former Premier, Yukon
- Anne Simpson, poet
- Wendell Smith, actor
- Lewis John Stringer, Cross of Valour (Canada) Recipient, Wall of Valour
- The Trews, a rock band

== Climate ==
Antigonish experiences a humid continental climate (Köppen Dfb), with warm, humid summers and cold, snowy winters. The highest temperature ever recorded in Antigonish was 37.8 °C (100 °F) on 12 August 1944. The coldest temperature ever recorded was −35.6 °C (−32 °F) on 19 January 1925.

Climate data for Southside Antigonish Harbour, 1981–2010 normals, extremes 1880–present (Note: Extreme high and low temperatures were recorded at Antigonish from December 1880 to December 1947 and again from July 1979 to December 1982, at Clydesdale from September 1990 to March 1995 and at Antigonish Harbour from January 1997 to present.)
Month	Jan	Feb	Mar	Apr	May	Jun	Jul	Aug	Sep	Oct	Nov	Dec	Year
Record high °C (°F)	17.0 (62.6)	16.7 (62.1)	26.0 (78.8)	29.7 (85.5)	34.0 (93.2)	35.6 (96.1)	37.2 (99.0)	37.8 (100.0)	34.4 (93.9)	26.7 (80.1)	22.2 (72.0)	17.0 (62.6)	37.8 (100.0)
Mean daily maximum °C (°F)	−1.3 (29.7)	−0.6 (30.9)	3.4 (38.1)	8.6 (47.5)	15.6 (60.1)	21.0 (69.8)	25.2 (77.4)	25.0 (77.0)	20.9 (69.6)	13.7 (56.7)	8.1 (46.6)	2.7 (36.9)	11.9 (53.4)
Daily mean °C (°F)	−5.8 (21.6)	−5.4 (22.3)	−1.3 (29.7)	3.9 (39.0)	9.8 (49.6)	15.1 (59.2)	19.4 (66.9)	19.5 (67.1)	15.3 (59.5)	9.1 (48.4)	4.1 (39.4)	−1.3 (29.7)	6.9 (44.4)
Mean daily minimum °C (°F)	−10.4 (13.3)	−10.2 (13.6)	−5.9 (21.4)	−0.7 (30.7)	4.0 (39.2)	9.2 (48.6)	13.5 (56.3)	13.9 (57.0)	9.8 (49.6)	4.4 (39.9)	0.2 (32.4)	−5.4 (22.3)	1.9 (35.4)
Record low °C (°F)	−35.6 (−32.1)	−35.0 (−31.0)	−31.1 (−24.0)	−21.1 (−6.0)	−11.1 (12.0)	−6.7 (19.9)	0.6 (33.1)	0.0 (32.0)	−5.6 (21.9)	−10.0 (14.0)	−17.8 (0.0)	−27.2 (−17.0)	−35.6 (−32.1)
Average precipitation mm (inches)	118.4 (4.66)	85.3 (3.36)	101.0 (3.98)	97.7 (3.85)	74.8 (2.94)	85.0 (3.35)	77.7 (3.06)	106.9 (4.21)	94.4 (3.72)	127.6 (5.02)	145.6 (5.73)	131.7 (5.19)	1,246.1 (49.06)
Average rainfall mm (inches)	53.0 (2.09)	40.0 (1.57)	66.6 (2.62)	81.9 (3.22)	74.6 (2.94)	85.0 (3.35)	77.7 (3.06)	106.9 (4.21)	94.4 (3.72)	127.6 (5.02)	130.7 (5.15)	77.7 (3.06)	1,016.1 (40.00)
Average snowfall cm (inches)	64.1 (25.2)	46.6 (18.3)	33.5 (13.2)	15.6 (6.1)	0.2 (0.1)	0.0 (0.0)	0.0 (0.0)	0.0 (0.0)	0.0 (0.0)	0.0 (0.0)	12.6 (5.0)	56.6 (22.3)	229.2 (90.2)
Average precipitation days (≥ 0.2 mm)	17	11	14	16	14	12	11	14	15	19	19	16	178
Average rainy days (≥ 0.2 mm)	8	7	10	14	14	12	11	14	15	19	16	9	149
Average snowy days (≥ 0.2 cm)	12	6	7	4	0	0	0	0	0	0	5	8	42
Source 1: Environment Canada
Source 2: The Weather Network

== Gallery ==
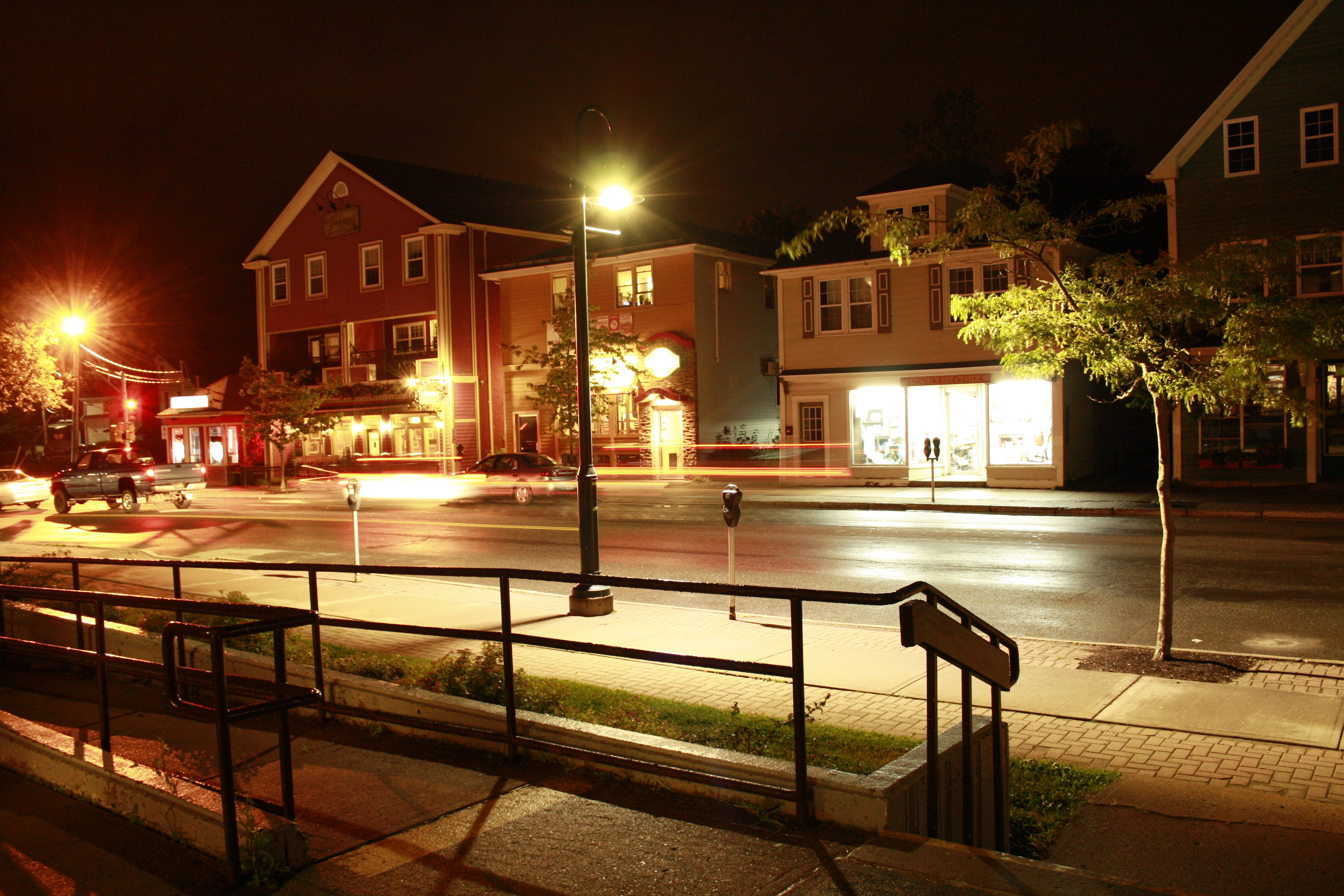
Main Street

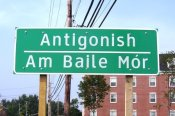
Gaelic and English road sign

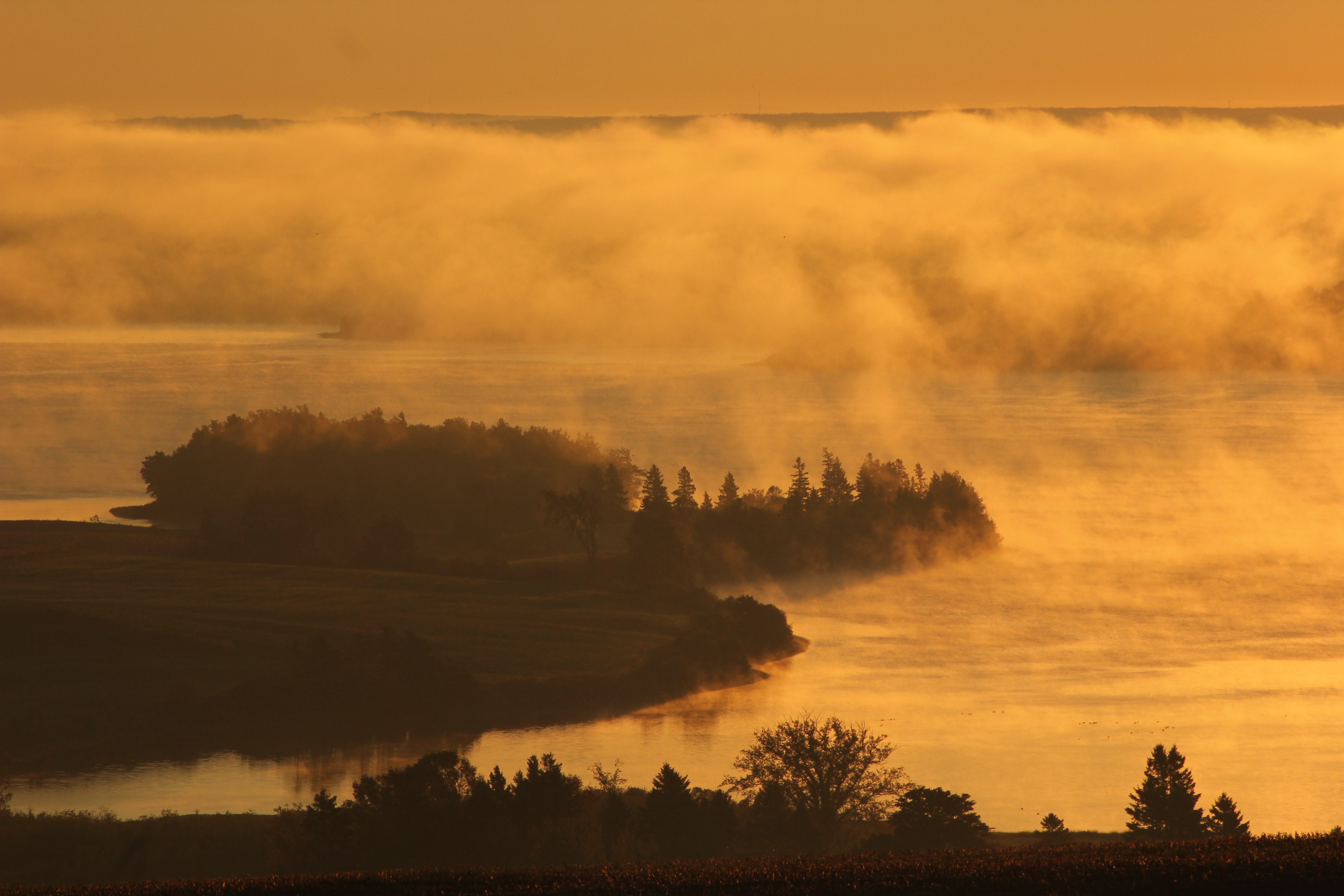
Antigonish Landing Wildlife Area

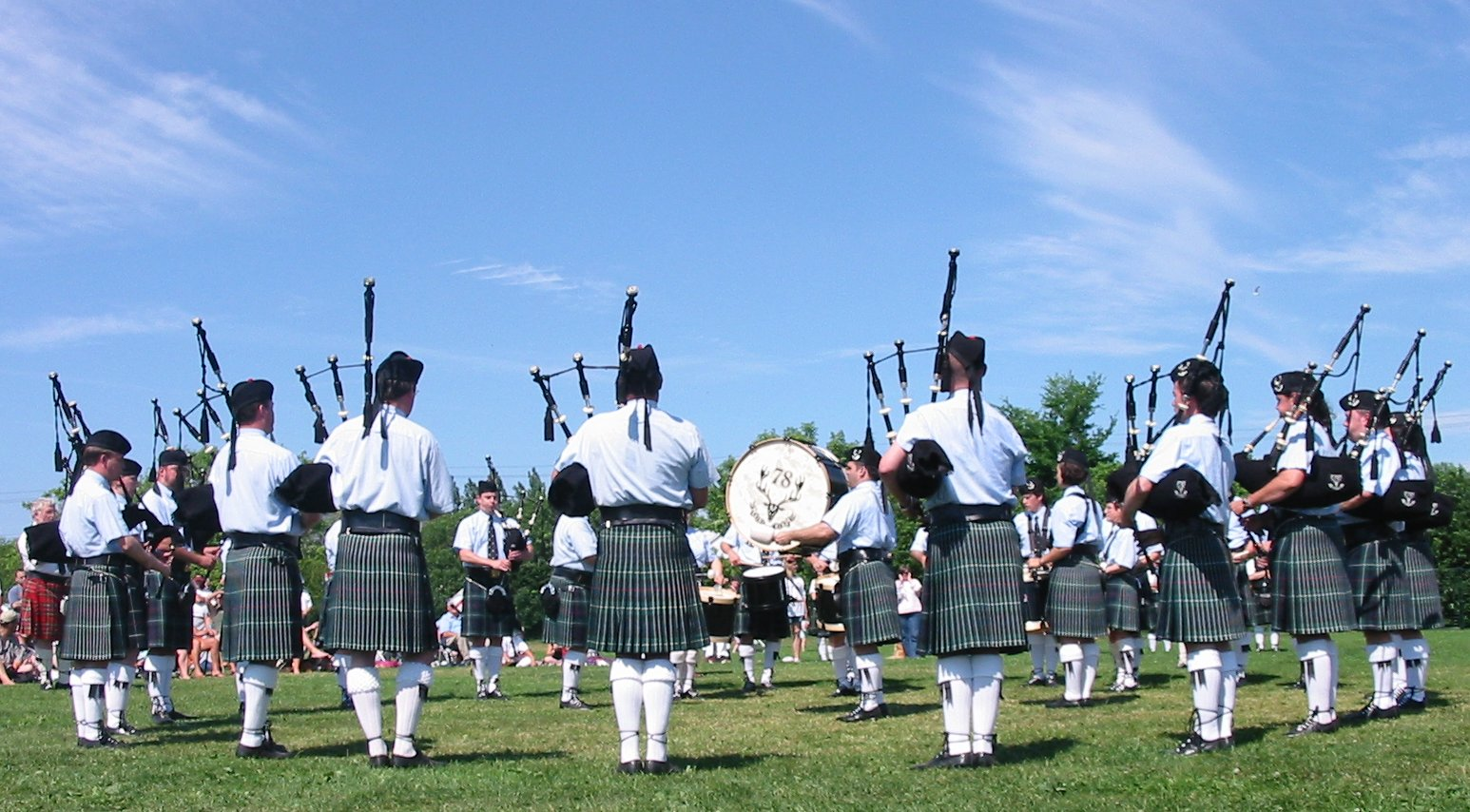
Antigonish Highland Games

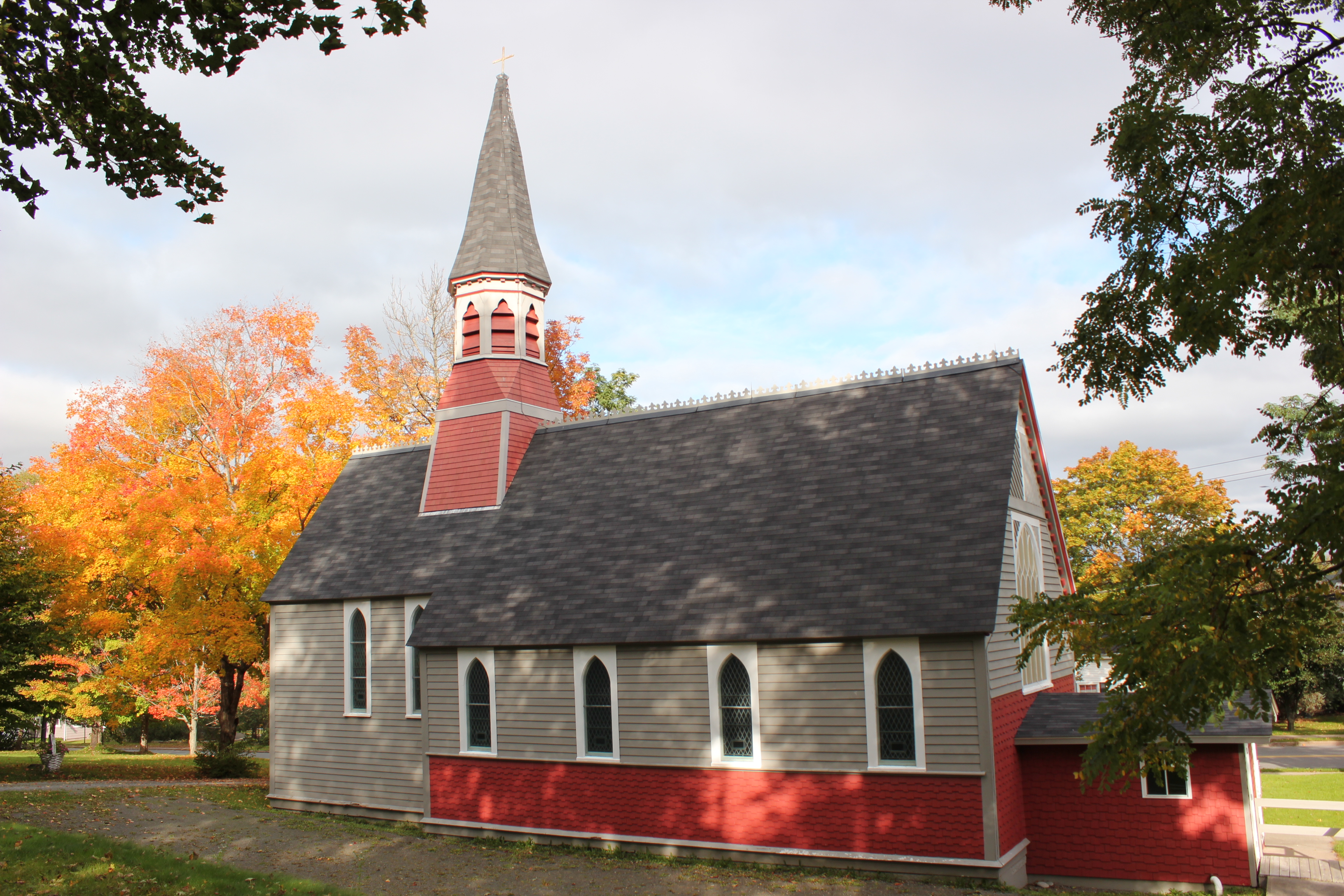
St. Paul the Apostle Anglican Church

== See also ==
- List of municipalities in Nova Scotia
