= List of communities in Richmond County, Nova Scotia =

This is a list of communities in Richmond County, Nova Scotia.

Communities are ordered by the highway on which they are located, whose routes start after each terminus near the largest community.

== Arterial highway ==
- Highway 104: Lower River Inhabitants, Evanston, Walkerville, Grande Anse, Louisdale, Thibeauville, Cannes.

== Trunk routes ==
- Trunk 4: Cleveland – Kempt Road – Grande Anse – St. Peter's – Barra Head – Chapel Island – Soldier's Cove – McNab's Cove – Hay Cove – Red Islands- Johnstown – Irish Cove

== Collector roads ==
- Route 206: Arichat – West Arichat
- Route 247: L'Ardoise – Grande Greve- Point Michaud
- Route 320: Arichat – D'Escousse – Lennox Passage – Grande Anse
- Route 327: Forchu

== Rural roads ==
- Cape Auguet
- Cape George
- Dundee
- Evanston
- Framboise
- French Cove
- Grandique Ferry
- Grantville
- Head of Loch Lomond
- Hureauville
- Janvrin Island Peninsula
- Lake Uist
- L'Archeveque
- Little Anse
- Loch Lomond
- Louisdale
- Lower River Inhabitants
- Lower St Espirit
- Port Malcolm
- Petit-de-Grat
- River Bourgeois
- Salmon River
- Samson's Cove
- Sporting Mountain
- St. Esprit
- St. George's Channel
- Walkerville
- West Bay
- Whiteside
