= Fleur-de-lis Trail =

Roadway in Nova Scotia, Canada

Coordinates: 45°51′44.5″N 60°10′30.9″W

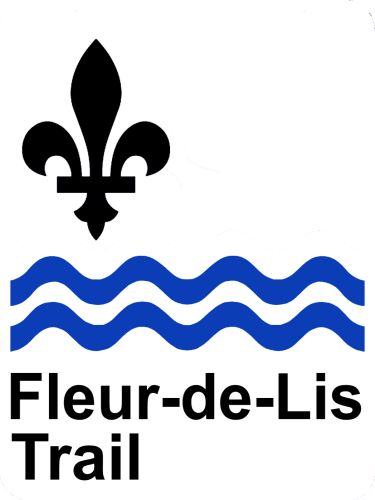
Fleur-de-lis Trail

Route information
- Length: 217 km (135 mi) Isle Madame spur: 35 km (22 mi)
- Component highways: Trunk 4; Trunk 22; Route 206; Route 247; Route 320; Route 327

Major junctions
- West end: Hwy 104 (TCH) / Hwy 105 (TCH) / Trunk 19 in Port Hastings
- East end: Louisbourg

Location
- Country: Canada
- Province: Nova Scotia
- Counties: Cape Breton Regional Municipality, Inverness, Richmond

Highway system
- Provincial highways in Nova Scotia; 100-series

The Fleur-de-lis Trail is a scenic roadway located on Nova Scotia's Cape Breton Island. It is approximately 182 km (113 mi) long and runs along the southeastern part of the island through an Acadian region, with a 35 km (22 mi) spur route to and encircling Isle Madame, for a total distance of 217 km (135 mi).

== Routes ==
- Trunk 4
- Trunk 22
- Route 206
- Route 247
- Route 320
- Route 327
- Trout Brook Road
- Fourchu Road
- St. Peters Fourchu Road

== Communities ==
- Port Hawkesbury
- Arichat
- Isle Madame
- D'Escousse
- Lennox Passage
- Grandique Ferry
- Louisdale
- Grande Anse
- L'Ardoise
- St. Peters
- Lower St. Esprit
- Fourchu
- Gabarus Lake
- Marion Bridge
- Trout Brook
- Albert Bridge
- Catalone
- Louisbourg

== Parks ==
- Two Rivers Wildlife Park
- Mira River Provincial Park
- Lennox Passage Provincial Park
- Burnt Island Provincial Park
- Point Michaud Beach Provincial Park
- Battery Prov. Park
- St. Peters Canal National Historic Site
- Pondville Beach Provincial Park
- The Fortress of Louisbourg National Historic Site
