= Cape St. George (disambiguation) =

Cape St. George is the southernmost point on the island of New Ireland, Papua New Guinea.

Cape St. George may also refer to:

- Battle of Cape St. George, a naval battle of World War II
- Cape St. George, Newfoundland and Labrador, Canada
- Cape St. George (Greece), in Greece
- Cape St. George, Jervis Bay Territory, Australia
- USS Cape St. George (CG-71), a Ticonderoga-class guided missile cruiser
- ABFC Cape St. George, a Cape-class patrol boat of the Australian Border Force

== See also ==
- Cape George (disambiguation)
- Cape St. George Island
- Cape St. George Lighthouse
- Saint George (disambiguation)
