= Soldiers Cove, Nova Scotia =

Community in Nova Scotia, Canada

Coordinates: 45°42′02″N 60°44′13″W

Soldiers Cove in Nova Scotia

Soldiers Cove (Scottish Gaelic: Camus an t-Saighdeir) is a small community in the Canadian province of Nova Scotia, located in Richmond County on Cape Breton Island. It's named after veterans of the War of 1812 who settled in the area.

The community is located on Nova Scotia Trunk 4 between Barra Head and Hay Cove.
