= Nova Scotia Route 247 =

Highway in Nova Scotia, Canada

Route 247

Route information
- Maintained by Nova Scotia Department of Transportation and Infrastructure Renewal
- Length: 11 km (6.8 mi)

Major junctions
- West end: Trunk 4 in St. Peter's
- East end: Westside Grand River Road in Lower L'Ardoise

Location
- Country: Canada
- Province: Nova Scotia

Highway system
- Provincial highways in Nova Scotia; 100-series
← Route 246	→ Route 252

Route 247 is a collector road in the Canadian province of Nova Scotia.

It is located on Cape Breton Island in Richmond County and connects St. Peters at Trunk 4 with Lower L'Ardoise.

== Communities ==
- St. Peter's
- Point Michaud
- L'Ardoise
- Grande Greve
- Grand River
- Lower L'Ardoise

== Parks ==
- Point Michaud Beach Provincial Park
- Battery Provincial Park

== See also ==
- List of Nova Scotia provincial highways
