= Framboise River =

- Location within Nova Scotia

Location
- Country: Canada
- Province: Nova Scotia
- County: Richmond

Physical characteristics
- Mouth
  - coordinates: 45.702351°N 60.332088°W

Framboise River is an estuarine river in Cape Breton Island, Nova Scotia, Canada.

== Course ==
The Framboise River (CAMVI) is an estuary that extends to the northwest from Seal Rocks and Framboise Cove on the coast to where Bagnells River (Bagnells Lake), Middle River Framboise and Northeast Framboise River converge. Strachans Brook and Mary Anns Brook enter the estuary from the south. The mouth of the river is at 45.702351°N 60.332088°W. The community of Framboise, Nova Scotia, lies to the southwest of the river. "Framboise" means raspberry in French, and probably was given as a descriptive name by the early settlers.

== Watershed ==
Lakes in the watershed include MacArthurs Lake and MacMullin Lake, which are connected by a channel. MacArthurs Lake has been described as "a beautiful pond". It is at 45.787801°N 60.302678°W. It is at an elevation of 31 metres (102 ft). The 5,640 hectares (13,900 acres) Middle-River Framboise Wilderness Area is a relatively inaccessible protected area of wetlands, streams, lakes and well-defined and forested drumlins.

A deposit of ore containing zinc (9.55%), lead (2.28%) and copper (0.94%) was discovered in Strachans Brook in the 1890s. The Stirling base metal deposit, or Mindamar Mine, was purchased by British Metals Corporation, which operated the mine between 1935 and 1938, discharging waste and unrecovered metals directly into the brook. The mine was reopened from 1952 to 1956, with the waste now impounded in a tailings pond. The brook flows slowly eastward through low-gradient swampy reaches for 8 kilometres (5.0 mi) to join the Framboise River estuary 4 kilometres (2.5 mi) from the coast. There is a small deltaic fan at the mouth of the brook. It is not clear whether the quality of water and sediments in the Framboise River have been degraded by the dispersal of the tailings.

== Sources ==
- Faubert, Victor Maurice (2008), MacArthurs Lake
- Framboise River, Natural Resources Canada
- Hamilton, William Baillie (1996), Place Names of Atlantic Canada, University of Toronto Press, ISBN 978-0-8020-7570-3
- Hulshof, A.H.M.; Macdonald, A.S. (31 December 1998), "Dispersion of tailings from the Stirling Zn-Pb-Cu mine site, Cape Breton Island, Nova Scotia", Atlantic Geology, 34 (3), doi:10.4138/2047
- MacArthurs Lake, Natural Resources Canada
- "MacArthurs Lake Topo Maps", Yellow Maps
- Middle River-Framboise Wilderness Area, Nova Scotia Environment
