= 1877 Atlantic hurricane season =

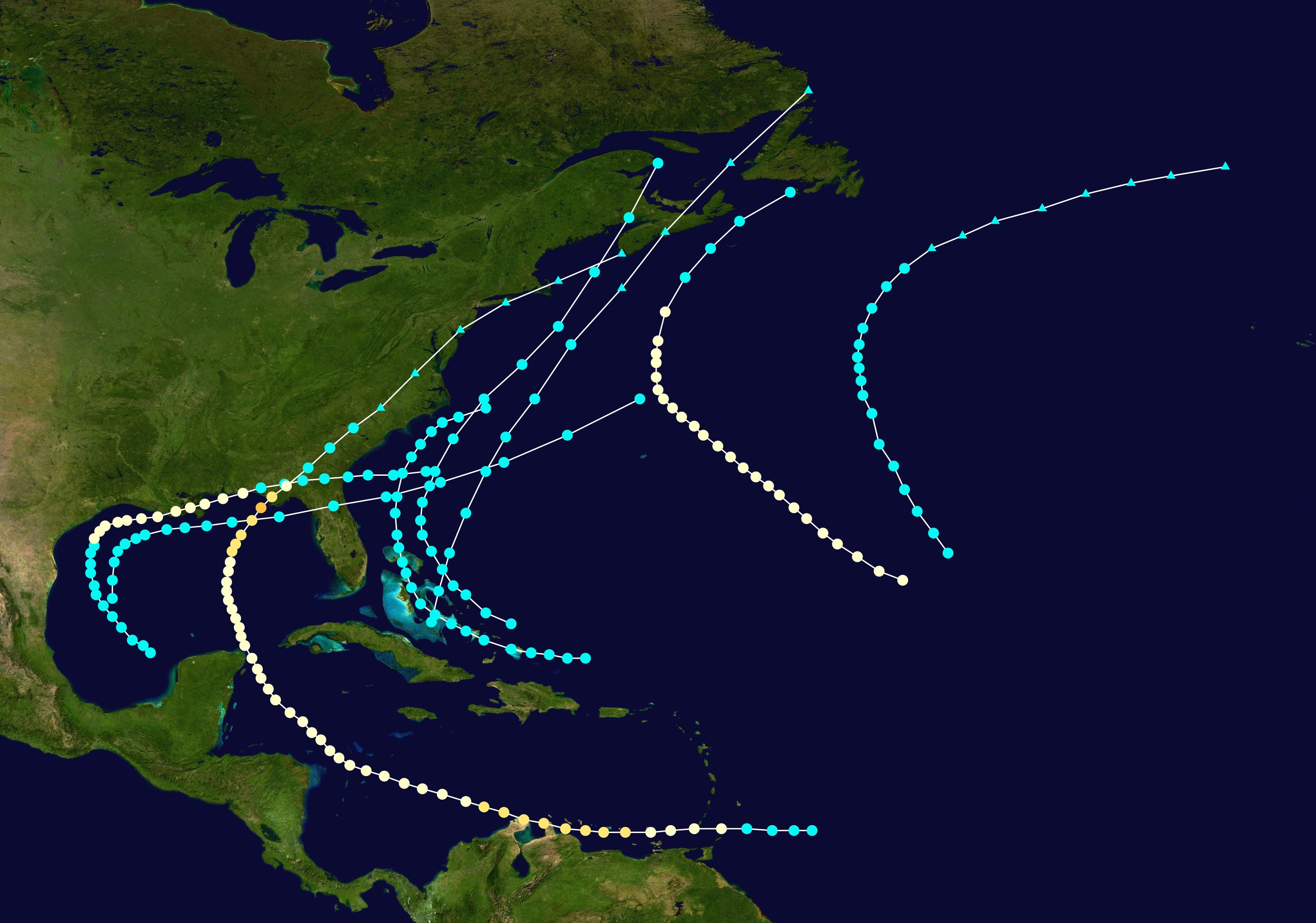
- Season summary map

Seasonal boundaries
- First system formed: August 1, 1877
- Last system dissipated: November 29, 1877

Strongest storm
- Name: Four
  - Maximum winds: 115 mph (185 km/h) (1-minute sustained)
  - Lowest pressure: 960 mbar (hPa; 28.35 inHg)

Seasonal statistics
- Total storms: 8
- Hurricanes: 3
- Major hurricanes (Cat. 3+): 1
- Total fatalities: 87
- Total damage: $2.5 million (1877 USD)

The 1877 Atlantic hurricane season featured one of the most devastating tropical cyclones to impact the Dutch Caribbean constituent country of Curaçao. Eight tropical storms are known to have developed, three of which strengthened into hurricanes, while one of those intensified into a major hurricane. (Note: A major hurricane is a storm that ranks as Category 3 or higher on the Saffir–Simpson hurricane wind scale.) However, in the absence of modern satellite and other remote-sensing technologies, only storms that affected populated land areas or encountered ships at sea were recorded, so the actual total could be higher. An undercount bias of zero to six tropical cyclones per year between 1851 and 1885 and zero to four per year between 1886 and 1910 has been estimated.

Although meteorologists José Fernández-Partagás and Henry F. Diaz in 1995 did not add any previously undocumented storms to the official hurricane database (HURDAT), they modified the tracks of all but two systems. The Atlantic hurricane reanalysis project also did not add any previously unknown cyclones and made mostly minor adjustments to the paths and intensities of some storms. However, climate researcher Michael Chenoweth authored a reanalysis study, published in 2014, which concluded that the 1877 season featured a total of seven tropical cyclones. This included the removal of the first, sixth, seventh, and eighth systems and the addition of three previously undocumented storms. Chenoweth also proposed some alterations to the track and intensity of each existing storm. However, these changes have yet to be incorporated into HURDAT.

The track of the season's first cyclone begins near the Turks and Caicos Islands on August 1. It dissipated after striking New Brunswick four days later, but not before drowning three people by capsizing a ship. In mid-September, the season's second system inflicted about $500,000 (1877 USD) in damage due to flooding in Texas and Louisiana. (Note: All damage figures are in 1877 USD, unless otherwise noted) Later that month, the fourth cyclone caused over $2 million in damage and at least 84 fatalities, with most of both totals occurring on Curaçao. Most of the other systems impacted land, but with only generally minor effects. Overall, the cyclones of the 1877 season left at least 87 fatalities and more than $2.5 million in damage.

== Season summary ==
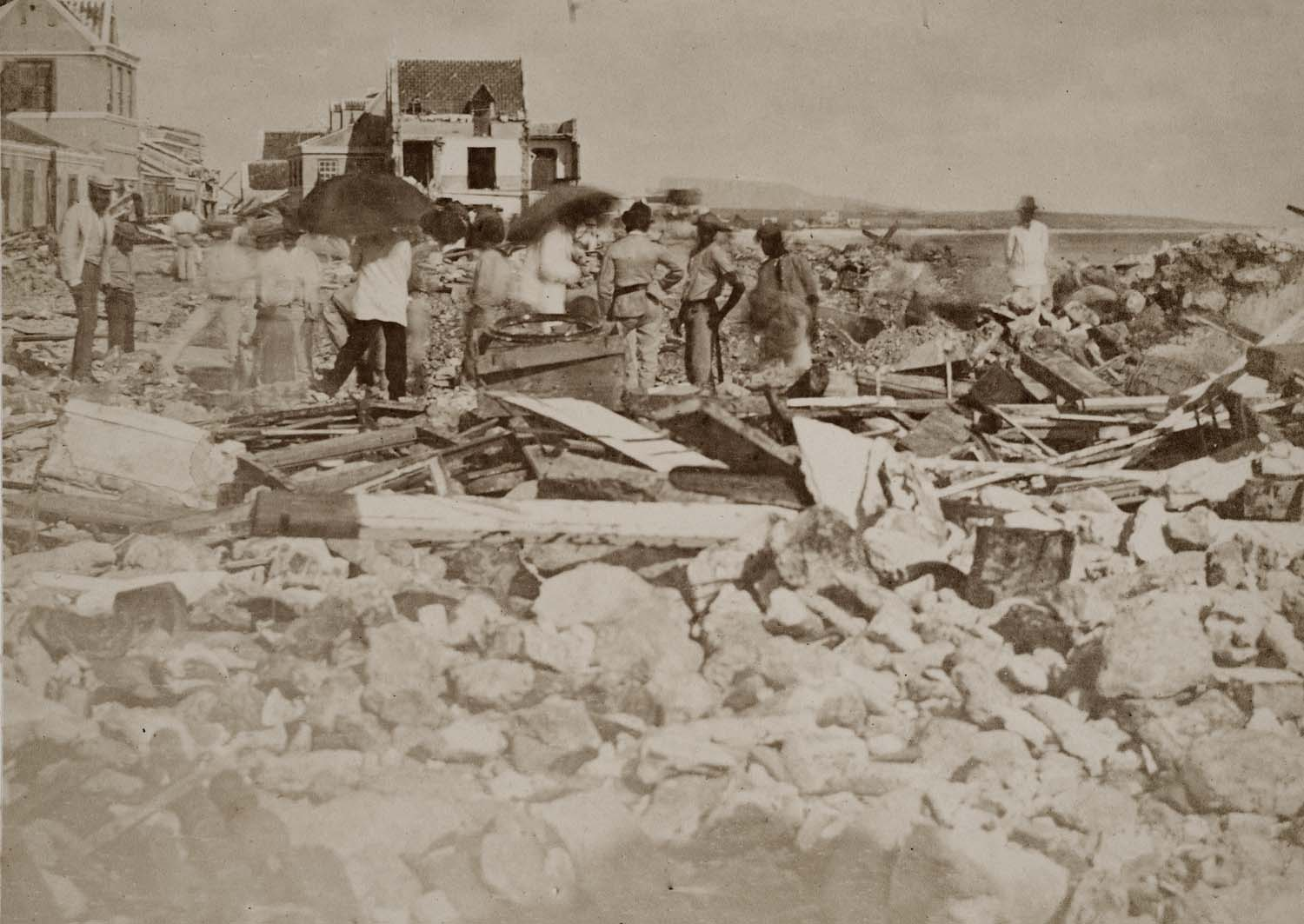
Destruction on Curaçao due to the fourth cyclone

The Atlantic hurricane database (HURDAT) recognizes eight tropical cyclones for the 1877 season. Three storms attained hurricane status, with winds of 75 mph (120 km/h) or greater. The fourth hurricane peaked with maximum sustained winds up to 115 mph (185 km/h) and a minimum atmospheric pressure of 955 mbar (28.2 inHg), making it a major hurricane. Neither meteorologists José Fernández-Partagás and Henry F. Diaz in 1995 nor the Atlantic hurricane reanalysis project added any previously undocumented storms. However, a 2014 study by climate researcher Michael Chenoweth recommended the removal of the first, sixth, seventh, and eight systems from HURDAT, while also arguing for the addition of four new storms, for a net loss of one cyclone. However, Chenoweth's proposals have yet to be incorporated into HURDAT.

The track for the first known storm begins on August 1 near the Turks and Caicos Islands and ends after the cyclone struck New Brunswick four days later. Three people drowned after that cyclone sank the schooner Vanname. September featured four systems, three of which intensified into hurricanes. High tides, heavy rainfall, and strong winds from the season's storm produced almost $500,000 in damage in Texas and Louisiana. Later in September, the season's fourth cyclone caused devastation in areas throughout its path, inflicting more than $2 million in damage and at least 84 deaths, mostly on Curaçao. Two tropical storms are known to have existed in October. The eighth and final cyclone of the season is estimated to have developed by November 28 near Exuma in the Bahamas. Moving northeastward, the system transitioned into an extratropical cyclone on November 29 prior to crossing Atlantic Canada.

Despite an ongoing El Niño, which may have been the strongest on record, the season's activity was reflected with a near normal accumulated cyclone energy (ACE) rating of 73. This value was higher than the previous five seasons but less than three other years that decade. ACE is a metric used to express the energy used by a tropical cyclone during its lifetime. Therefore, a storm with a longer duration will have higher values of ACE. It is only calculated at six-hour increments in which specific tropical and subtropical systems are either at or above sustained wind speeds of 39 mph (63 km/h), which is the threshold for tropical storm intensity. Thus, tropical depressions are not included here.

== Systems ==
=== Tropical Storm One ===
- Tropical storm (SSHWS)
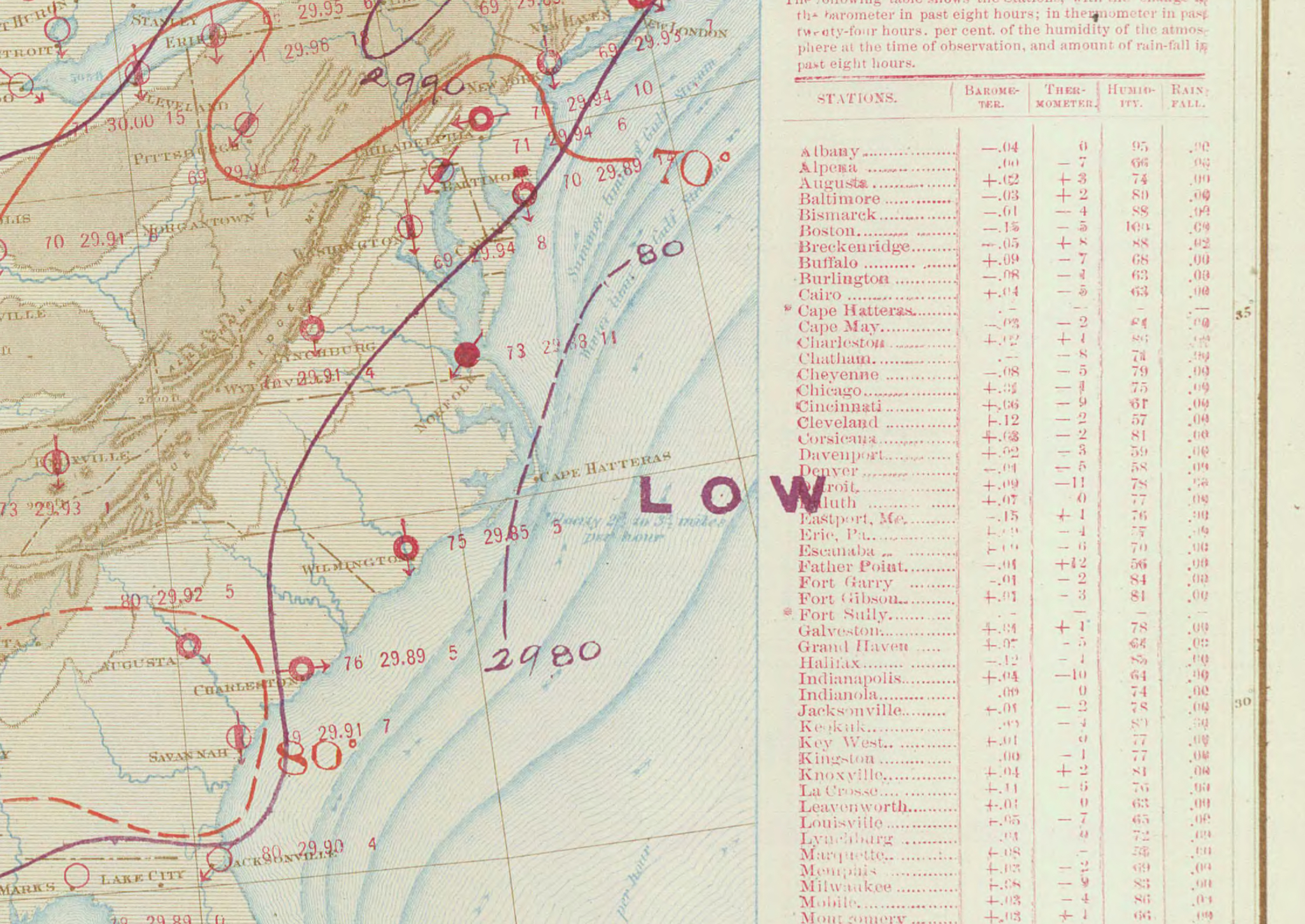
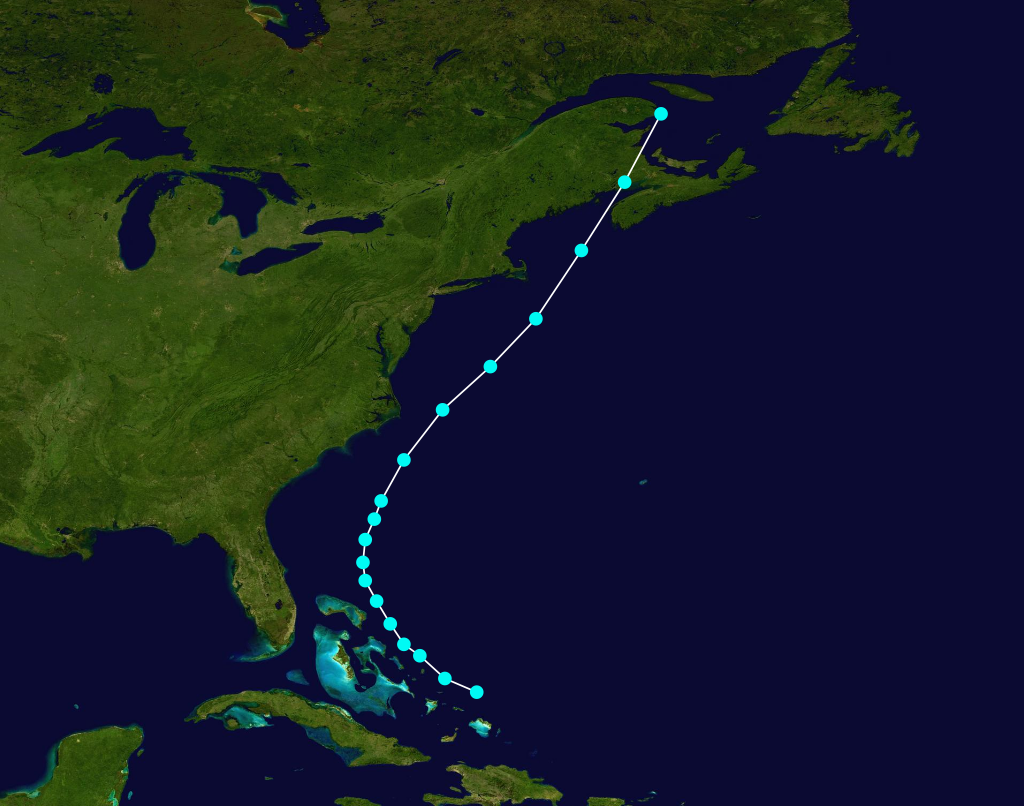
- Duration: August 1 – August 5
- Peak intensity: 70 mph (110 km/h) (1-min);

Mimicking the path created in the 1993 reanalysis led by C. J. Neumann, the track for this cyclone begins north of Turks and Caicos Islands on August 1, one day before Florida reported stormy conditions. It tracked along the eastern edge of the Bahamas, before paralleling the East Coast of the United States. By August 2, the tropical storm was nearly a hurricane, though records show that winds never exceeded 70 mph (110 km/h). A schooner known as Vanname recorded sustained winds of 69 mph (111 km/h) on the following day. The cyclone then gradually weakened while heading generally northeast, making landfall near Cape Spencer, New Brunswick, with winds of 60 mph (95 km/h) on August 5. Shortly thereafter, the storm was last noted over the western Gulf of St. Lawrence.

Three people drowned as the Vanname capsized, while seven people survived by clinging to the remnants of the ship until being rescued by the schooner Minnie Reppelier. On land, the storm produced elevated winds in the United States from Florida to New York. Nova Scotia recorded falling barometric pressures. Climate researcher Michael Chenoweth could not confirm the existence of this storm due to potentially unreliable accounts, erring on the side of proposing the removal of this cyclone from HURDAT.

=== Hurricane Two ===
- Category 1 hurricane (SSHWS)
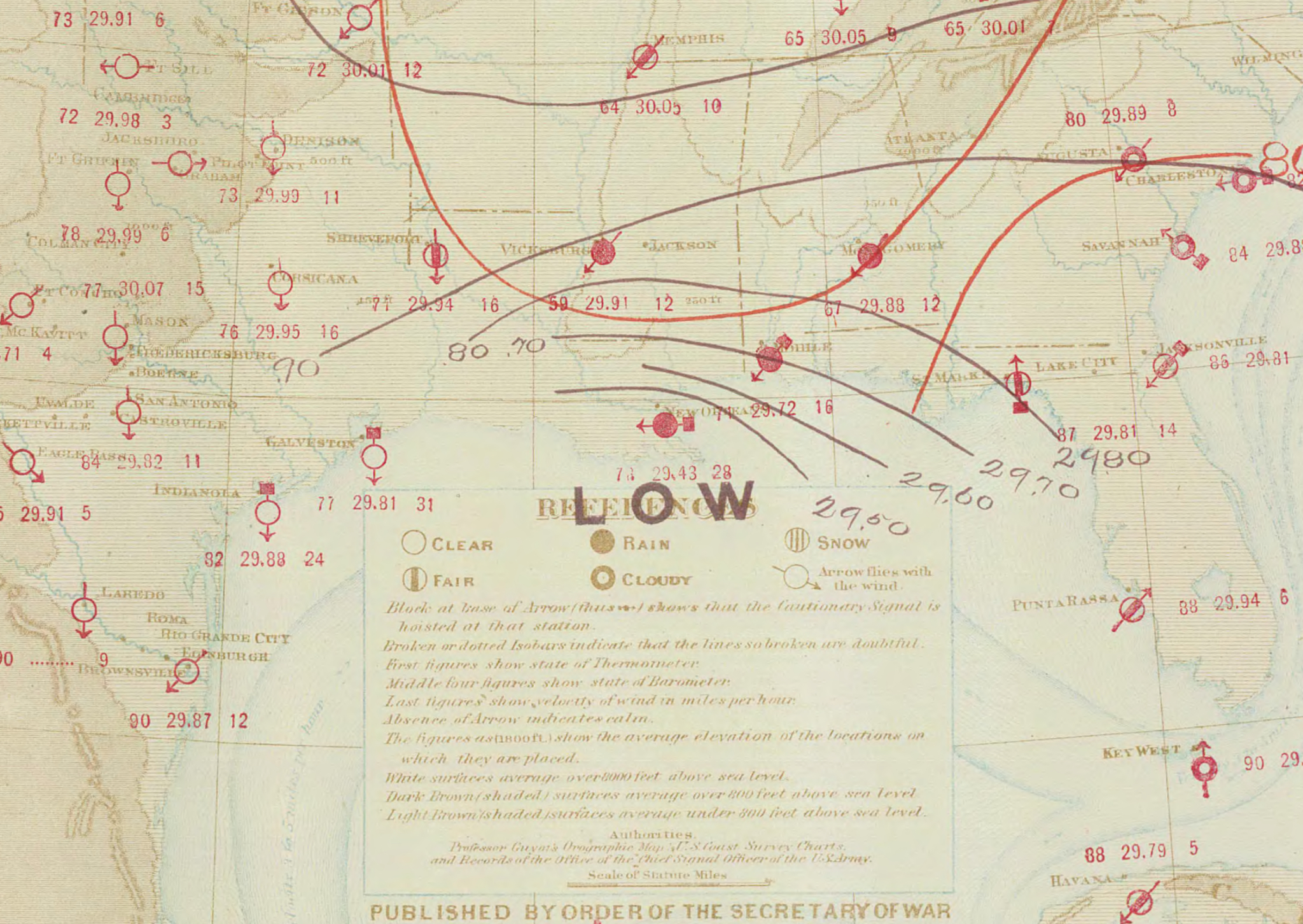
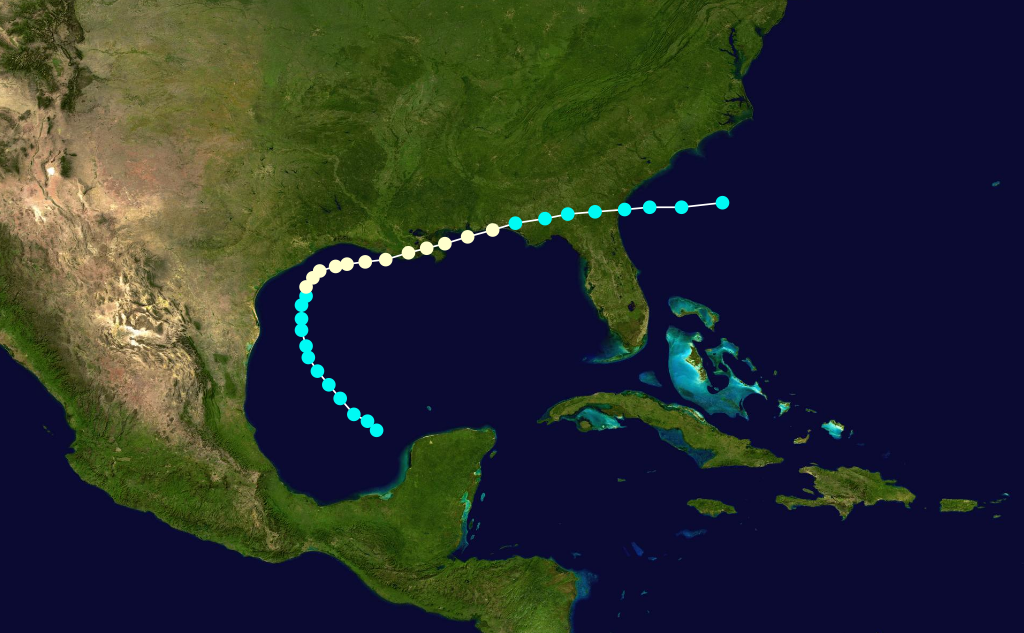
- Duration: September 14 – September 21
- Peak intensity: 80 mph (130 km/h) (1-min); 982 mbar (hPa)

Although the Monthly Weather Review reported decreasing atmospheric pressures over the Gulf of Mexico as early as the night of September 12, the track for this storm begins on September 14 about 110 mi (175 km) west-northwest of the Yucatán Peninsula. Initially moving northwestward, the cyclone turned northward on September 16, roughly 24 hours before it intensified into a hurricane. Later on September 17, the hurricane curved east-northeastward while just offshore Texas. At 16:00 UTC the next day, the storm made landfall to the southwest of Cocodrie, Louisiana, with maximum sustained winds of 80 mph (130 km/h) and an estimated minimum pressure of 982 mbar (29.0 inHg). On September 19 the hurricane made another landfall at Fort Walton Beach, Florida. It quickly weakened back to a tropical storm while still in the state of Florida. After emerging into the Atlantic on September 20, the storm was last noted the next day roughly 175 mi (280 km) southeast of Cape Fear, North Carolina.

The entire coast of Texas experienced impacts from this storm. Galveston observed sustained winds up to 60 mph (97 km/h) and tides reached up to 5.2 ft (1.6 m) above mean low water. Additionally, a 24-hour period saw 4.64 in (118 mm) of rainfall, setting the daily rainfall record for September 17. Parts of Galveston became submerged by tides for a few hours and a few unoccupied buildings were severely impacted by the storm. Other locations reporting coastal flooding included Brazos Island and Lynchburg. Extensive crop losses occurred in portions of Louisiana. Many barns, plantations, and crops suffered damage in St. John the Baptist Parish, with about 30% of rice crops ruined. In New Orleans, the hurricane downed numerous trees and fences and destroyed gardens. Damage in Texas and Louisiana alone reached nearly $500,000. Heavy rains fell over Alabama, causing the Black Warrior River to rise significantly. Chenoweth proposed few changes to the track or duration of this storm, but indicated that the cyclone became a hurricane on September 15 and added a tropical depression stage from September 20 onward.

=== Hurricane Three ===
- Category 1 hurricane (SSHWS)
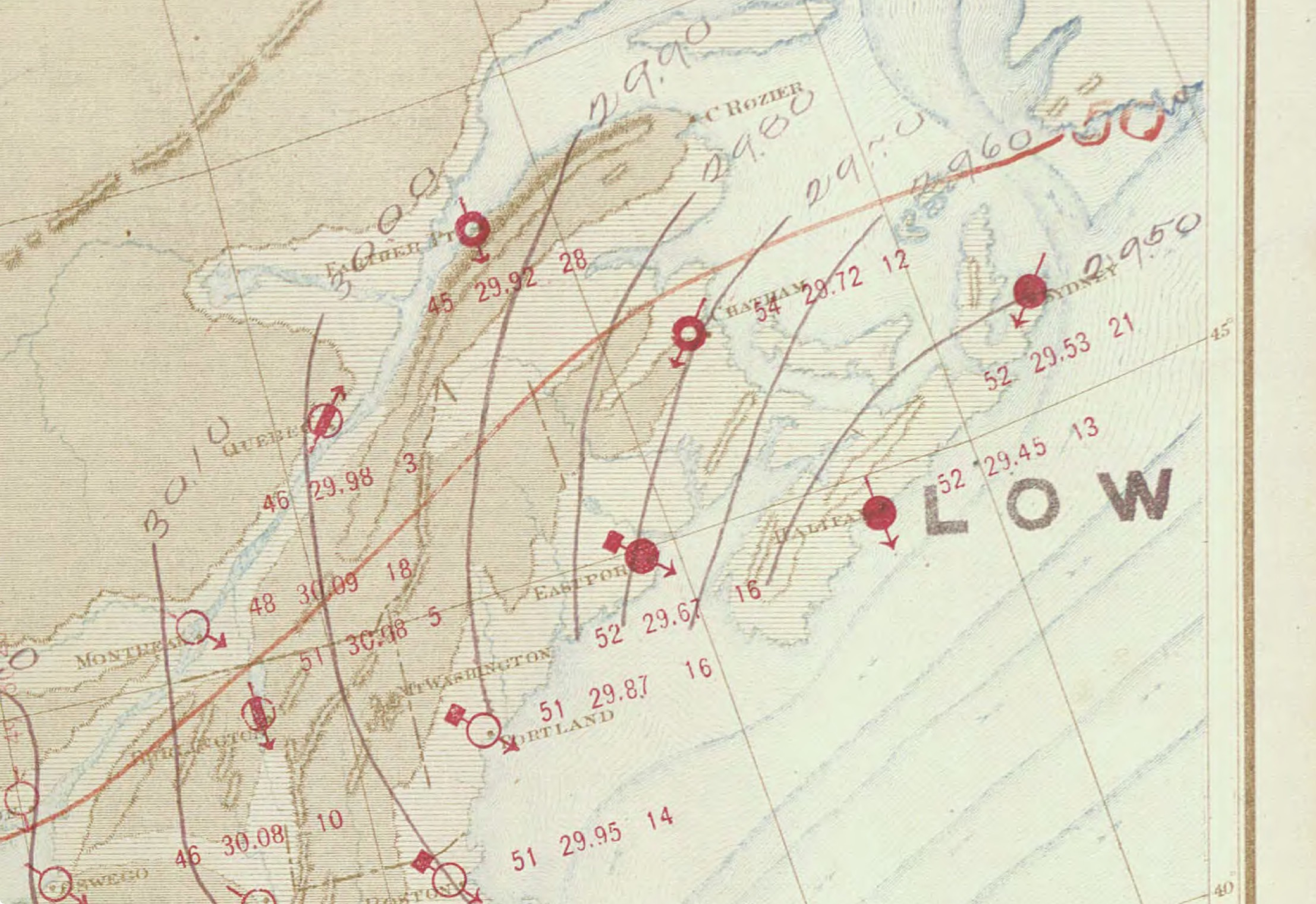
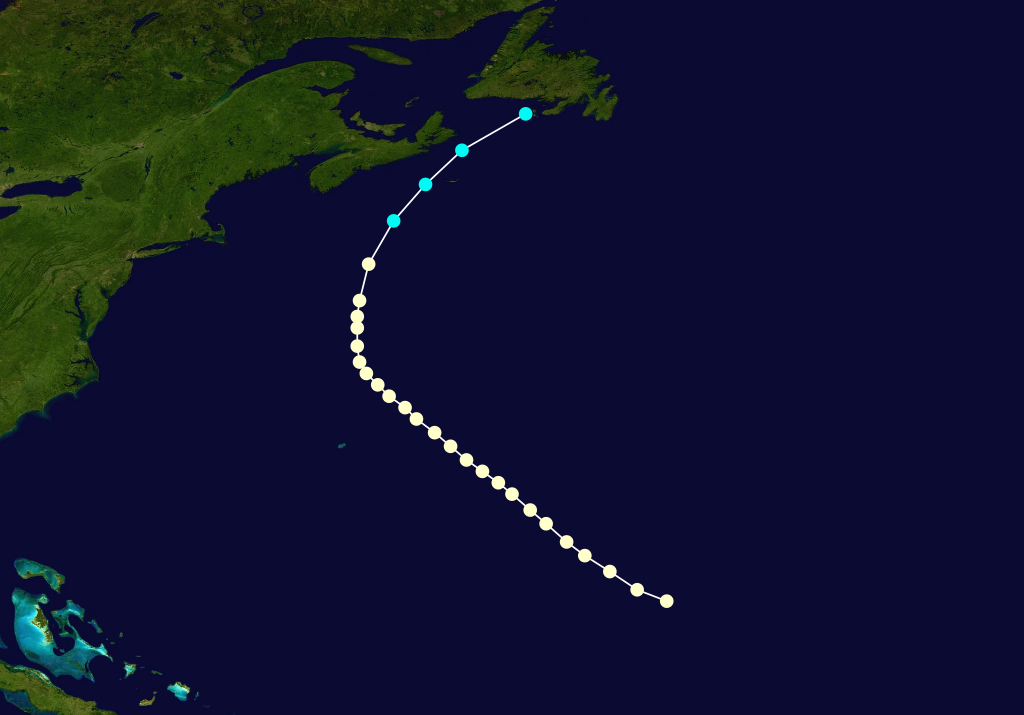
- Duration: September 16 – September 22
- Peak intensity: 80 mph (130 km/h) (1-min);

Although the steamer Antonio Lopez may have encountered this storm as early as September 11, a track could not be constructed as far back as that date because the location of the ship was not logged. Instead, the Atlantic hurricane database (HURDAT) initiates the track as a Category 1 hurricane about 900 mi (1,450 km) northeast of the Lesser Antilles on September 16. Reports from the ship Harley John and an unnamed vessel indicated the cyclone possessed sustained winds of 80 mph (130 km/h). The hurricane moved generally northwestward for a few days until turning northward on September 20. Curving northeastward on the following day, the cyclone weakened to a tropical storm on September 22 before being last noted several hours later just offshore Newfoundland's Burin Peninsula.

In Nova Scotia, St. Paul Island recorded a sustained wind speed of 81 mph (130 km/h). Canso reportedly experienced its worst gale in years. The ship Helene became stranded at St. Esprit, while the storm beached the steamship Rowland at Holyrood, Newfoundland. Chenoweth proposed significant changes to the storm's track and duration, showing a long-lived cyclone that developed east of the Capo Verde Islands on September 3. After crossing through the islands and moving generally westward, the system meandered around the central and north Atlantic before becoming extratropical well east of Newfoundland on September 24.

=== Hurricane Four ===
- Category 3 hurricane (SSHWS)
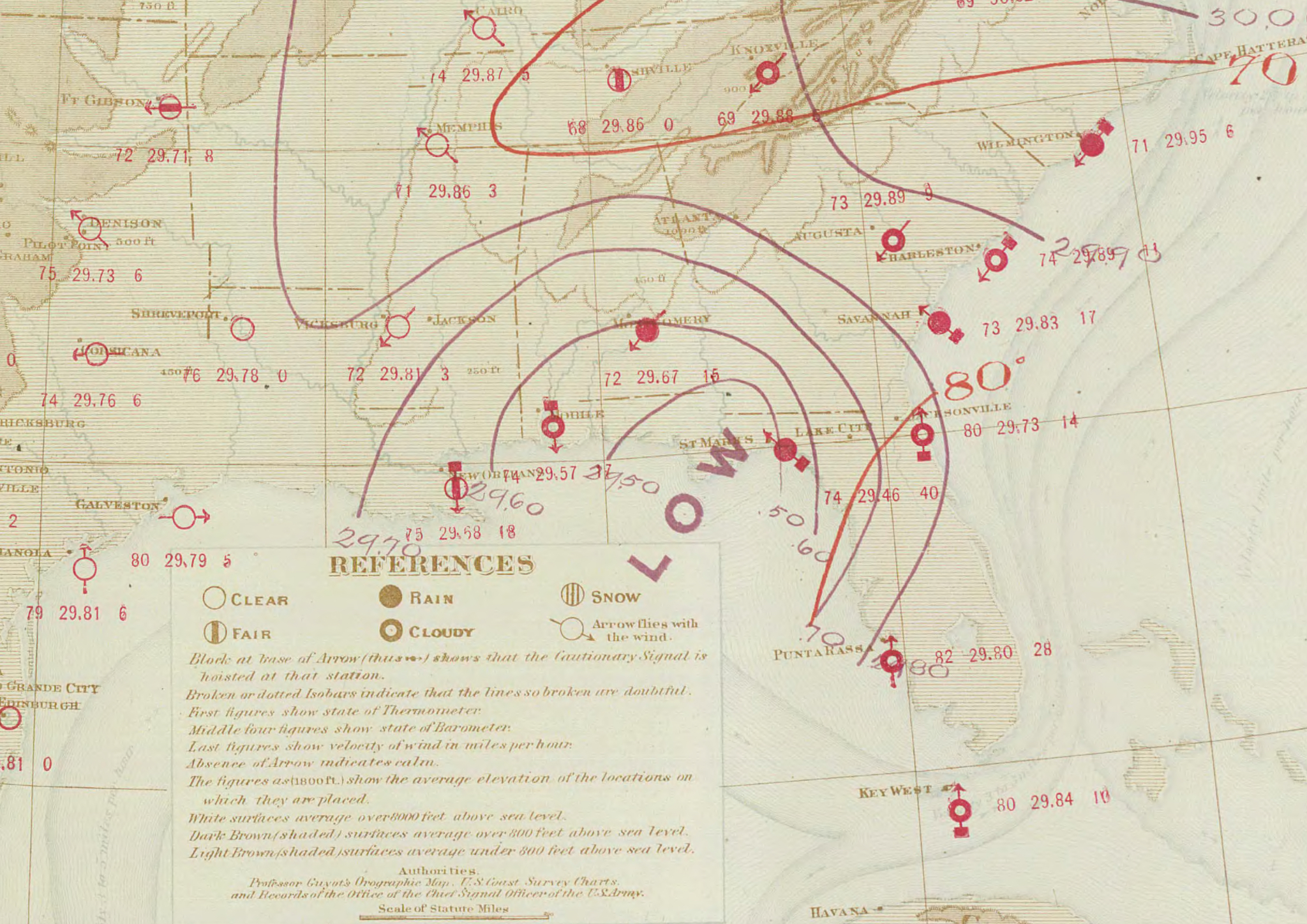
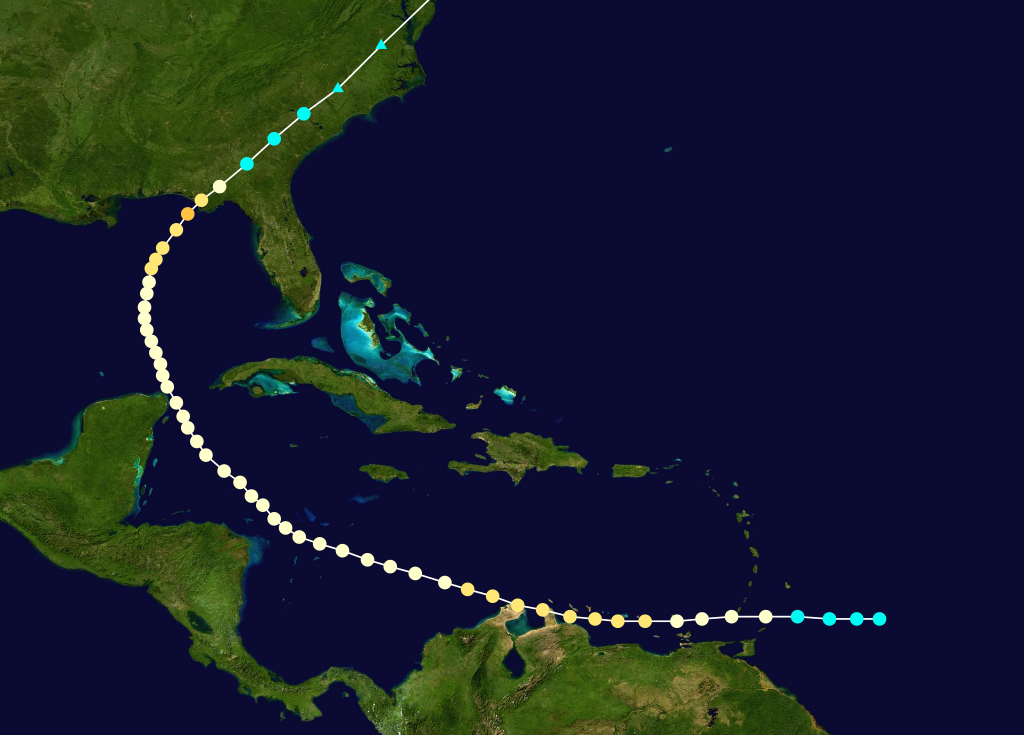
- Duration: September 21 – October 4
- Peak intensity: 115 mph (185 km/h) (1-min); 955 mbar (hPa)

On September 21, a tropical storm was first observed east of Grenada and Saint Vincent. Moving westward at a low latitude, the cyclone intensified into a hurricane early the next day while moving between Grenada and Tobago. The storm then remained close to the coast of South America while strengthening, becoming a Category 2 hurricane on the present-day Saffir–Simpson scale on September 23. Early on the next day, the system curved west-northwestward before striking Venezuela's Paraguaná Peninsula and Colombia's Guajira Peninsula. The cyclone turned northwestward by September 26, passing near the northeast tip of Mexico's Yucatán Peninsula. Upon reaching the central Gulf of Mexico, the storm began trekking to the north-northeast on October 1 and then to the northeast by the next day.

Early on October 3, the system intensified into a Category 3 hurricane, shortly before making landfall near present-day Mexico Beach, Florida, with winds of 115 mph (185 km/h) and a minimum pressure of 955 mbar (28.2 inHg). The storm rapidly weakened after moving inland, falling to tropical storm intensity over south-central Georgia several hours later. While passing over North Carolina on October 4, the system transitioned into an extratropical cyclone, which continued northeastward until dissipating offshore Nova Scotia on the next day. Chenoweth's study extends the track of this storm back to the central Atlantic on September 16. Following a similar path through the eastern and central Caribbean, Chenoweth proposed a major hurricane from September 23 to September 27. Unlike in HURDAT, however, Chenoweth also suggested that the cyclone crossed part of Central America and the Gulf of Honduras before striking the Yucatán Peninsula and then reaching the Gulf of Mexico.

Strong winds generated by the storm on Grenada downed some trees and telegraph lines and damaged some roofs. Saint Vincent also reported strong winds and heavy rains, but little damage occurred. The cyclone left catastrophic impacts on Curaçao. The New York Times noted that in Willemstad, "many of the most solid structures were crushed as if they were things of paper and many persons were buried in their ruins." Waves completely swept away a nunnery, with only one nun surviving. Numerous ships were lost in the vicinity of Curaçao. It is estimated that the storm caused at least 70 deaths and about $2 million on the island. In Cuba, winds and rains generated by the storm left damage and the loss of some lives in the western portion of Pinar del Río Province. St. Marks, Florida, reported a storm tide 12 ft (3.7 m) and sustained winds up to 66 mph (106 km/h). Across the Florida Panhandle, the hurricane beached vessels, washed away wharves, and ruined crops, particularly cotton and rice. These crops also suffered damage in Georgia along the Altamaha and Savannah rivers due to freshets. The storm caused heavy rain and flooding throughout North Carolina, with particularly severe impacts around Albemarle Sound. Heavy precipitation over the Northeastern United States washed out several railroads in parts of Delaware, New Jersey, New York, and Pennsylvania. Consequently, many train derailments occurred along those tracks, leading to seven deaths in Pennsylvania, three in New Jersey, and one in Delaware. Numerous ships were wrecked along the United States Atlantic coast. Overall, the hurricane was responsible for at least 84 deaths.

=== Tropical Storm Five ===
- Tropical storm (SSHWS)
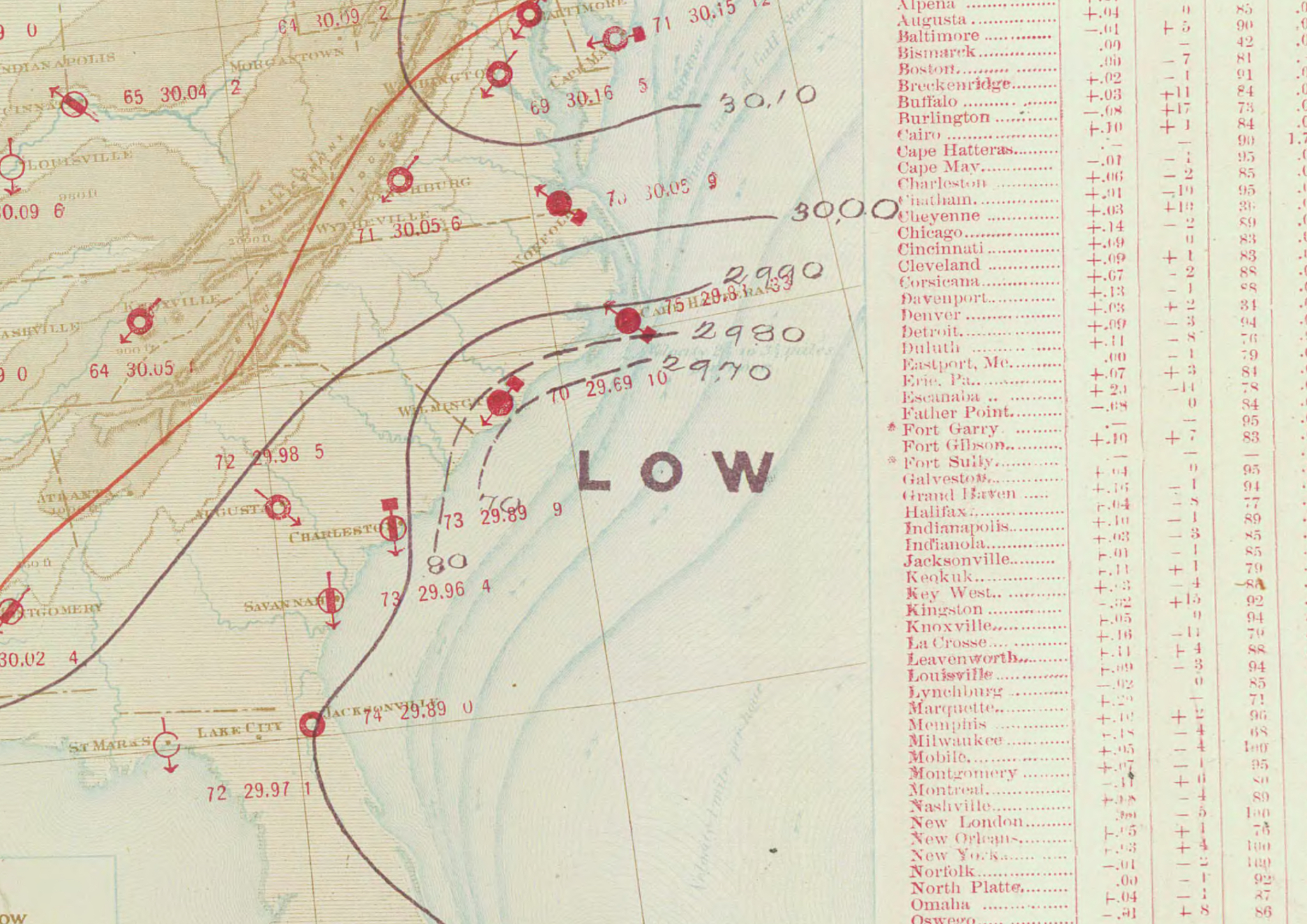
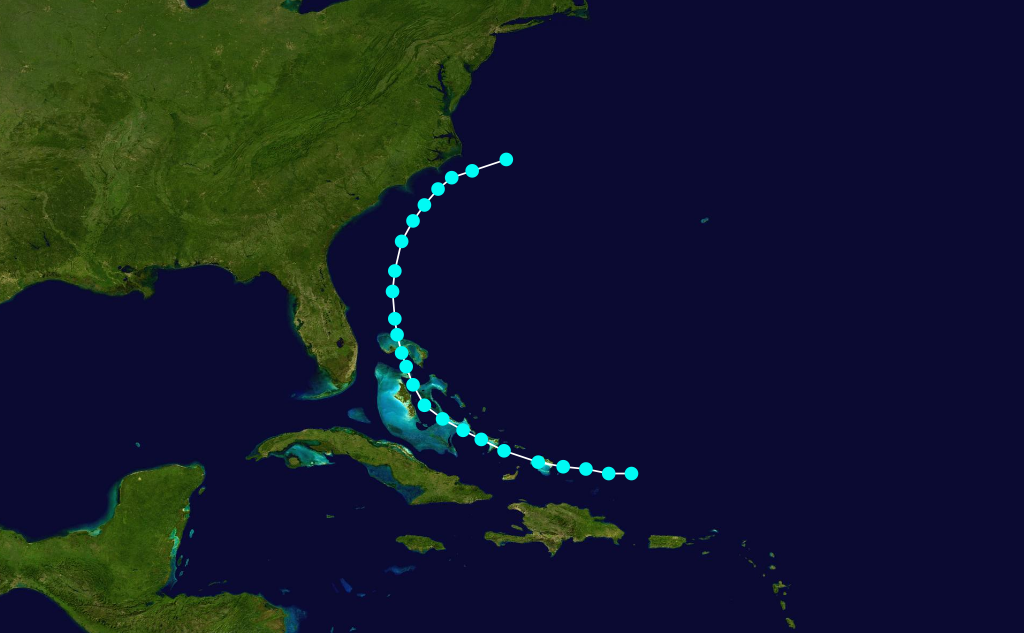
- Duration: September 24 – September 29
- Peak intensity: 60 mph (95 km/h) (1-min);

Observations from Cuba and Jamaica indicated that a storm existed to their northeast on September 24. Consequently, the track listed in HURDAT begins about 150 mi (240 km) northeast of the Dominican Republic. The cyclone moved west-northwestward, crossing through the Turks and Caicos Islands and the Bahamas, striking or passing near many islands including Acklins, Crooked Island, and Long Island before turning in a general northward direction east of Andros on September 26. Thereafter, the storm passed near or over islands such as New Providence and Grand Bahama before exiting the Bahamas on the next day. After passing the Bahamas, the cyclone moved parallel to the southeastern coast of the United States and intensified to sustained winds of 60 mph (95 km/h) on September 28, based on reports from the ships Magnolia and Gulf Stream and Cape Henry, Virginia. On September 29, the storm was last noted about 115 mi (185 km) east-southeast of Buxton, North Carolina.

The storm produced high seas and gales from Cape Lookout, North Carolina, to Cape Henry, Virginia, with the latter observing sustained winds of 63 mph (101 km/h). Heavy rains fell in the Wilmington area of North Carolina, flooding many roads and raising many local waterways. Chenoweth's study completely removes the Bahamian portion of the track and instead shows a storm developing near North Carolina on September 27. After approaching the Outer Banks, the storm moves in the semicircle out to sea, passing south of Bermuda during the process, before becoming extratropical on October 1.

=== Tropical Storm Six ===
- Tropical storm (SSHWS)
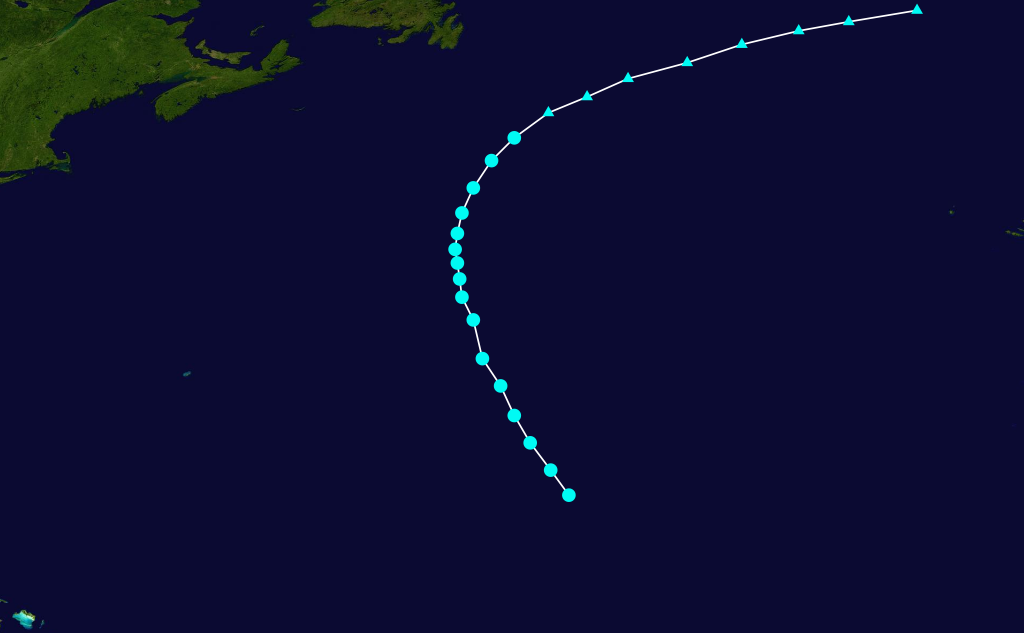
- Duration: October 13 – October 16
- Peak intensity: 60 mph (95 km/h) (1-min);

While no information exists on this storm prior to October 17, after it already became extratropical, HURDAT features a track beginning on October 13 about 1,075 mi (1,730 km) northeast of the Leeward Islands to resemble a path constructed by Neumann. It headed generally northwestward for a few days and likely did not intensify much beyond sustained winds of 60 mph (95 km/h), if at all. By October 16, the cyclone turned northeastward and transitioned into an extratropical cyclone later that day about 285 mi (460 km) southeast of Cape Race, Newfoundland. This extratropical storm lasted until October 18. Chenoweth instead declared this storm a slow-moving extratropical low-pressure area associated with a frontal system.

=== Tropical Storm Seven ===
- Tropical storm (SSHWS)
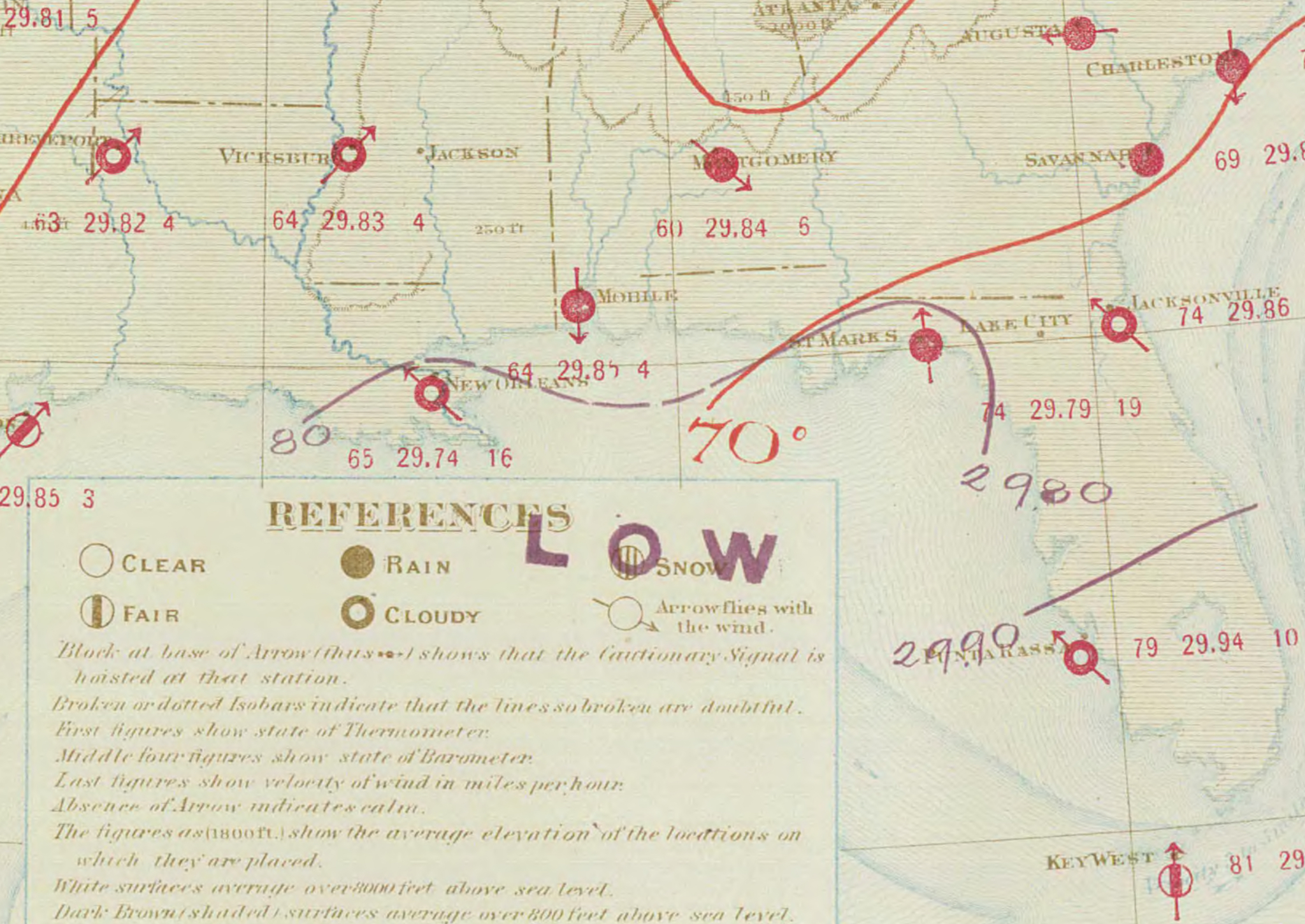
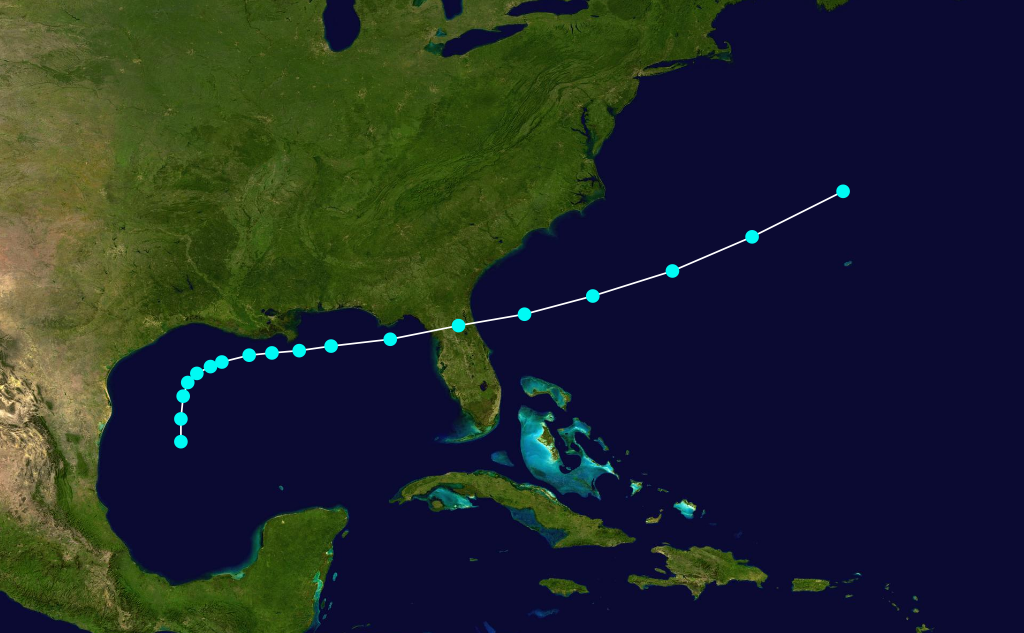
- Duration: October 24 – October 28
- Peak intensity: 60 mph (95 km/h) (1-min);

Heavy rainfall at Galveston, Texas, suggests the existence of a tropical storm over the west-central Gulf of Mexico on October 24. Following an initial motion to the north, the cyclone gradually curved to the east-northeast later that day. Around 21:00 UTC on October 26, the storm made landfall near Cedar Key, Florida, with sustained winds of 45 mph (75 km/h), based on St. Marks recording sustained winds of 40 mph (64 km/h). After the cyclone emerged into the Atlantic from the First Coast early the next day, further intensification occurred according to observations from the ship Camina, with the cyclone reaching maximum sustained winds of 60 mph (95 km/h). The cyclone was last noted on October 28 about 215 mi (345 km) north of Bermuda.

This storm produced heavy rainfall across the Gulf of Mexico, including up to 5 in (130 mm) of precipitation in Galveston, Texas. St. Marks, Florida recorded sustained winds of 40 mph (64 km/h). Chenoweth proposed the removal of this storm from HURDAT, arguing that evidence supported a cold front moving across Florida, followed by the development of an extratropical low offshore the Southeastern United States.

=== Tropical Storm Eight ===
- Tropical storm (SSHWS)
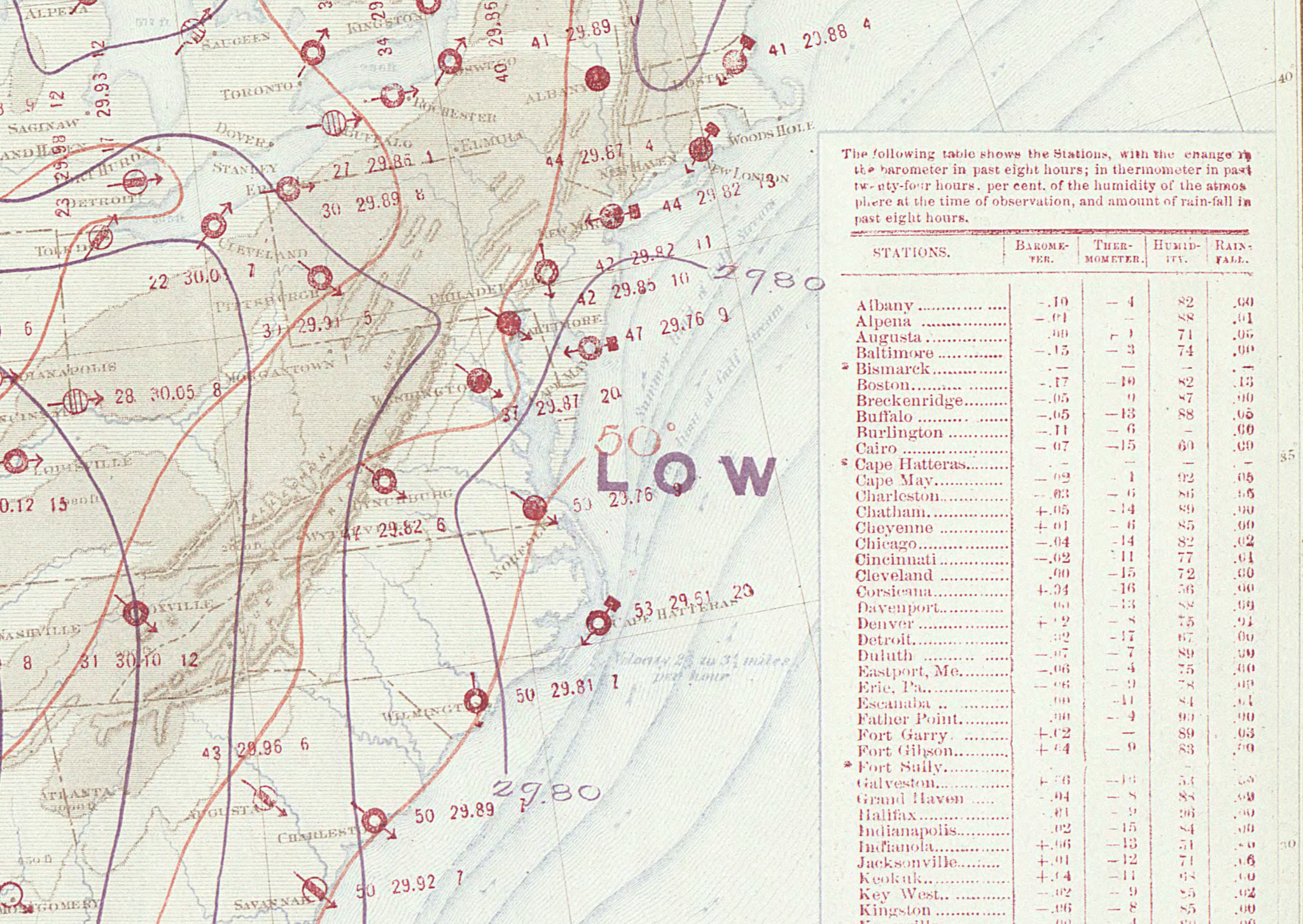
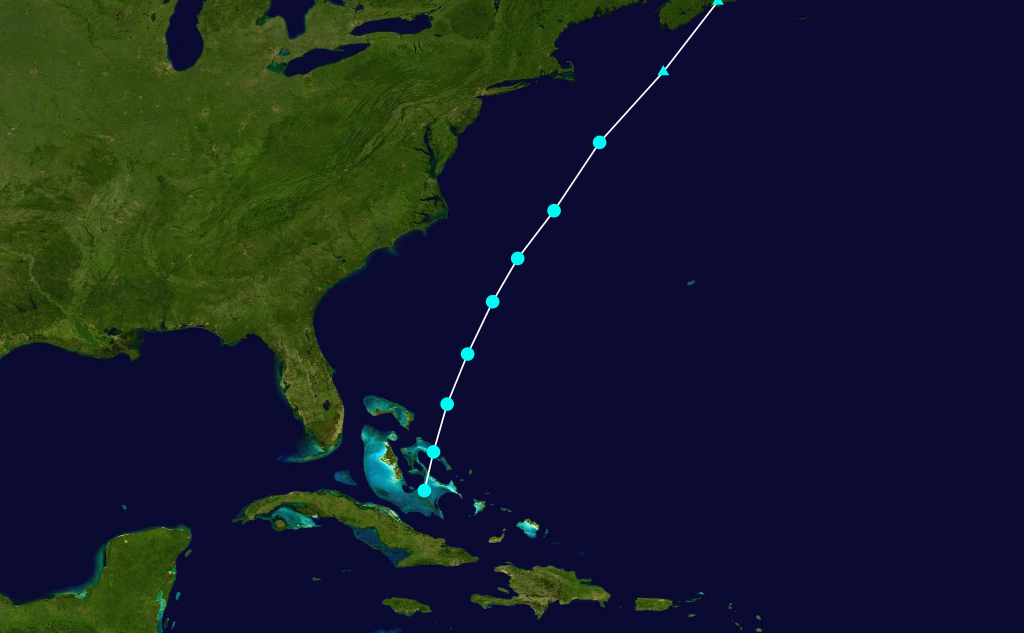
- Duration: November 28 – November 29
- Peak intensity: 60 mph (95 km/h) (1-min);

A ship known as the Princess Beatrice may have encountered this storm near the Leeward Islands between November 23 and November 25. However, the track listed in HURDAT does not begin until November 28 about 40 mi (65 km) southwest of Exuma in the Bahamas, when weather stations along the coast of the Southeastern United States reported decreasing atmospheric pressures. The cyclone moved northeastward for most of its duration, passing through the central Bahamas later that day before reaching the open Atlantic. Slight intensification occurred, with the storm peaking with winds of 60 mph (95 km/h) early on November 29, several hours before becoming extratropical approximately 125 mi (200 km) south of Cape Sable Island, Nova Scotia. The extratropical remnants crossed Atlantic Canada before dissipating on the following day. The 2014 study by Chenoweth also suggested that this system was extratropical.

=== Other storms ===
Chenoweth proposed three other storms not currently listed in HURDAT. The first such system formed over the central Atlantic on August 23 to the east of Bermuda and moved northeastward until dissipating on August 30. A second unofficial storm developed on October 2 to the southwest of the Azores. The storm passed through the archipelago, moving closest to São Miguel Island. On October 6, the system transitioned into an extratropical cyclone. Chenoweth's third and final proposed storm formed over the central Atlantic on October 26. Intensifying into a hurricane on the following day, the cyclone became extratropical northwest of the Azores several hours later.

== Season effects ==
This is a table of all of the known storms that formed in the 1877 Atlantic hurricane season. It includes their known duration (within the basin), areas affected, damages, and death totals. Deaths in parentheses are additional and indirect (an example of an indirect death would be a traffic accident), but were still related to that storm. Damage and deaths include totals while the storm was extratropical, a wave, or a low, and all of the damage figures are in 1877 USD.

Saffir–Simpson scale
TD	TS	C1	C2	C3	C4	C5

1877 North Atlantic tropical cyclone season statistics
Storm name	Dates active	Storm category at peak intensity	Max 1-min wind mph (km/h)	Min. press. (mbar)	Areas affected	Damage (US$)	Deaths	Ref(s).
One	August 1–5	Tropical storm	70 (110)	Unknown	East Coast of the United States, Atlantic Canada (New Brunswick)	Unknown	3	
Two	September 14–21	Category 1 hurricane	80 (130)	982	Gulf Coast of the United States (Louisiana and Florida)	>$500,000	None	
Three	September 16–22	Category 1 hurricane	80 (130)	Unknown	Atlantic Canada	Unknown	None	
Four	September 21 – October 4	Category 3 hurricane	115 (185)	955	Windward Islands, ABC islands, Venezuela, Colombia, Mexico, Eastern United States (Florida)	$2 million	84	
Five	September 24–29	Tropical storm	60 (95)	Unknown	The Bahamas, Southeastern United States	Unknown	None	
Six	October 13–16	Tropical storm	60 (95)	Unknown	None	None	None	
Seven	October 24–28	Tropical storm	60 (95)	Unknown	Gulf Coast of the United States (Florida)	Unknown	None	
Eight	November 12–29	Tropical storm	60 (95)	Unknown	The Bahamas, Atlantic Canada	Unknown	None	
Season aggregates
8 systems	August 1 – November 29		115 (185)	958		>$2.5 million	87	

== See also ==
- List of Florida hurricanes (pre-1900)
- List of Texas hurricanes (pre-1900)
- Tropical cyclone observation
