= Walkerville =

Walkerville is a name given to several places:

Australia

- Town of Walkerville, a local government area in South Australia
  - Walkerville, South Australia, a suburb in north-eastern Adelaide
- Walkerville, Victoria, a town in southwest Gippsland

Canada

- Walkerville, Ontario, a former company town that grew around the distillery built by Hiram Walker
- Walkerville, Nova Scotia

South Africa

- Walkerville, Gauteng

United Kingdom

- Walkerville, North Yorkshire, in England
- Walkerville, Walker, Newcastle Upon Tyne, in England

United States

- Walkerville, Indiana
- Walkerville, Michigan
- Walkerville, Montana

In education

- Walkerville Collegiate Institute, a high school in Windsor, Ontario, Canada

In entertainment

- Walkerville (fictional), the setting of the Magic School Bus cartoon series

== See also ==
- Walkersville (disambiguation)
