= Evanston =

Evanston may refer to locations:

in the United States:

- Evanston, Cincinnati, a neighborhood of Cincinnati, Ohio
- Evanston, Illinois, a city on Lake Michigan
- Evanston, Indiana, an unincorporated community
- Evanston, Kentucky
- Evanston, Wyoming

in Canada:

- Evanston, Calgary, a neighbourhood in Calgary, Alberta
- Evanston, Nova Scotia

in Australia:

- Evanston, South Australia
