= List of shipwrecks in June 1860 =

The list of shipwrecks in June 1860 includes ships sunk, foundered, grounded, or otherwise lost during June 1860.

== 1 June ==
List of shipwrecks: 1 June 1860
Ship	State	Description
HMS Assistance	Royal Navy	The troopship struck an uncharted rock and foundered off Aberdeen Island, Hong Kong. All on board survived.
Eliza	United Kingdom	The brig was wrecked near Petty Harbour, Newfoundland, British North America. Her crew were rescued. She was on a voyage from Liverpool, Lancashire to Harbour Grace, Newfoundland.
Ellen	(United Kingdom of Great Britain and Ireland) New Zealand	The schooner departed from Wellington for Dunedin. Presumed subsequently foundered with the loss of all hands. A capsized vessel was sighted between Wellington and Auckland which was thought to be Ellen.
John Middleton	United Kingdom	The brig ran aground on the Shipwash Sand, in the North Sea off the coast of Suffolk. She was on a voyage from Sunderland, County Durham to Bordeaux, Gironde, France. She was refloated with assistance from the smack Alfred (United Kingdom and taken in to Harwich, Essex.
Swea	Sweden	The steamship caught fire off Heligoland and was beached near Hamburg. She was on a voyage from Gothenburg to Hamburg .

== 2 June ==
List of shipwrecks: 2 June 1860
Ship	State	Description
Alexander	Denmark	The ship was abandoned in the Indian Ocean. Her crew were rescued by Gyrn Castle (United Kingdom). Alexander was on a voyage from Akyab, Burma to Falmouth, Cornwall, United Kingdom.
Anne	United Kingdom	The collier, a brig, was driven ashore and wrecked between Newhaven and Seaford, Sussex. Her crew were rescued by the Coast Guard using rocket apparatus. Anne was on a voyage from Newcastle upon Tyne, Northumberland to Portsmouth, Hampshire.
Atlantique	France	The brig was driven ashore at Brighton, Sussex with the loss of one of her eight crew. Survivors were rescued by the Brighton Lifeboat and the Coast Guard using rocket apparatus.
Benjamin Boyd	United Kingdom	The ship capsized in the Trocidero Channel, off the south coast of Spain. She was righted.
Christel, or Christine Tschernietz	Grand Duchy of Oldenburg	The schooner capsized in the English Channel 12 nautical miles (22 km) off Beachy Head, Sussex. Her crew were rescued by the brig Lively (United Kingdom. Christel was on a voyage from Danzig to Dublin, United Kingdom.
Contest	United Kingdom	The yacht was driven against the quayside and sank at Southampton Hampshire.
Eliza Jones	United Kingdom	The schooner was driven ashore and severely damaged at Newhaven. Her five crew were rescued. She was on a voyage from Harwich, Essex to Dublin.
Endeavour	United Kingdom	The fishing lugger was driven ashore and wrecked at Newhaven with the loss of all six crew.
Falcon	United Kingdom	The brigantine was driven ashore and wrecked at Bonchurch, Isle of Wight. Her five crew were rescued.
Georgina	United Kingdom	The barque ran aground and sank off Rye, Sussex with the loss of all hands.
James and Emma	United Kingdom	The barque was driven ashore near Rye. Her crew were rescued. She was on a voyage from London to Havre de Grâce, Seine-Inférieure, France.
Jeremiah Garnett	United Kingdom	The ship ran aground in the Hooghly River. She was on a voyage from Calcutta, India to Mauritius. She was refloated and resumed her voyage. Subsequently reported wrecked at the Sand Heads.
Jeune Henri	France	The chasse-marée was driven ashore at Newhaven. Her fifteen crew were rescued.
John Wightman	United Kingdom	The lugger was driven ashore at Newhaven. Her six crew were rescued.
Light and Sign	United Kingdom	The ship was driven ashore at Hill Head, Hampshire. She was on a voyage from Sunderland, County Durham to Southampton.
Margaret	United Kingdom	The brigantine was driven ashore and wrecked at Newhaven. Her crew survived. She was on a voyage from South Shields, County Durham to Poole, Dorset.
Marguerite	United Kingdom	The schooner was driven ashore and wrecked at Brighton. Her crew were rescued. She was on a voyage from Newcastle upon Tyne to Poole.
Mary and Ann	United Kingdom	The sloop was driven ashore and wrecked at Whitby, Yorkshire. She was on a voyage from Middlesbrough to Whitby.
Mary Ann	United Kingdom	The sloop was driven ashore and wrecked at Shoreham-by-Sea, Sussex. She was on a voyage from Sunderland to Yarmouth, Isle of Wight.
Phoenix	United Kingdom	The ship was driven ashore at Hastings, Sussex.
Pike	United Kingdom	The sloop was driven ashore near Shoreham-by-Sea. Her nine crew were rescued by the Shoreham Lifeboat. She was on a voyage from Hartlepool, County Durham to Shoreham-by-Sea.
Pride	United Kingdom	The ship spang a leak and foundered in the Bristol Channel. Her crew survived.
Reine des Clippers	French Navy	The steamship was destroyed by fire at Macao, China.
Shamrock	United Kingdom	The brig was driven ashore and wrecked near Chichester, Sussex. She was on a voyage from Guernsey, Channel Islands to London.
Teutonia	Hamburg	The steamship ran aground on the Brambles, in the Solent. She was refloated.
Transit	United Kingdom	The brig was driven ashore and wrecked at Brighton. Her eight crew were rescued by the Brighton Lifeboat and the Coast Guard using rocket apparatus. She was on a voyage from Hartlepool to Shoreham-by-Sea.
Wonder	United Kingdom	The collier, a schooner was driven ashore and wrecked at Newhaven. Her crew were rescued.
Woodside	United Kingdom	The schooner was driven ashore at Newhaven with the loss of her captain from her three crew. Survivors were rescued by rocket apparatus. She was on a voyage from South Shields to Southampton, Hampshire.
X. L.	United Kingdom	The schooner was run into by the brig Leon (Spain) and sank at Deal, Kent. Her crew were rescued. She was on a voyage from Hartlepool to Deal.

== 3 June ==
List of shipwrecks: 3 June 1860
Ship	State	Description
Catherine	United Kingdom	The Mersey Flat sank in Liverpool Bay off the North West Lightship ( Trinity House). She was refloated on 5 June.
Celestine	United Kingdom	The ship was driven ashore at Great Yarmouth, Norfolk. She was on a voyage from Great Yarmouth to London. She was refloated and put back to Great Yarmouth.
Forest Queen	United Kingdom	The brig capsized in the English Channel between Dungeness, Kent and Beachy Head, Sussex with the loss of three of the five people on board. Survivors were rescued by Maynard (United Kingdom). Forest Queen was on a voyage from London to Guernsey, Channel Islands. She was towed in to Ramsgate, Kent the next day in a derelict condition.
Lady Sale	United Kingdom	The ship was driven ashore at Mappleton, Yorkshire. She was on a voyage from Seaham, County Durham to London. Lady Sale was refloated on 11 June and towed in to Grimsby, Lincolnshire by the tug Lady Wilberforce (United Kingdom).
Lucietta	United Kingdom	The ship capsized and sank in the River Medway at Rochester, Kent. She was on a voyage from South Shields, County Durham to Rochester.
Mary Ann	United Kingdom	The brig was driven ashore and severely damaged at Blyth, Northumberland. She was on a voyage from Harwich, Essex to Sunderland, County Durham.
New Mary	(United Kingdom of Great Britain and Ireland) Gibraltar	The schooner was driven ashore at Great Yarmouth. Her crew were rescued.
Pride	United Kingdom	The schooner sprang a leak and foundered off Trevose Head, Cornwall. Her four crew were rescued by the schooner Aid (United Kingdom). Pride was on a voyage from Swansea, Glamorgan to Exeter, Devon.
Stokesley	United Kingdom	The snow foundered in the Grand Banks of Newfoundland. Her nine crew survived. She was on a voyage from A Coruña, Spain to Quebec City, Province of Canada, British North America.
Triumph	(United Kingdom of Great Britain and Ireland) Guernsey	The brig was driven ashore on Hayling Island, Hampshire. Her crew were rescued by the Coast Guard. She was on a voyage from Guernsey to London.
Walker	United Kingdom	The snow foundered off the Dutch coast. Her nine crew survived. She was on a voyage from South Shields to a Dutch port.

== 4 June ==
List of shipwrecks: 4 June 1860
Ship	State	Description
Ann	United Kingdom	The collier, a brig, was holed by her anchor and sank in the River Thames. She was on a voyage from Sunderland, County Durham to London.
Charlotte	United Kingdom	The Yorkshire Billyboy was driven ashore and wrecked at Whitburn, County Durham. Her crew were rescued by the Whitburn Lifeboat Thomas Wilson (United Kingdom).
Teutonia	United Kingdom	The steamship ran aground on the Brambles Sandbank, in the Solent. She was on a voyage from Queenstown, County Cork to Southampton, Hampshire. She was refloated.
Tornado	United Kingdom	The full-rigged ship was abandoned in Poll Bay. Her 40 crew survived. She was on a voyage from Callao, Peru to Queenstown, County Cork.

== 5 June ==
List of shipwrecks: 5 June 1860
Ship	State	Description
Edith	United Kingdom	The ship was driven ashore and wrecked at Domesnes, Russia. She was on a voyage from Hartlepool, County Durham to Kronstadt, Russia.
Hero	United Kingdom	The ship struck a sunken rock and was severely damaged at Bunbeg, County Donegal. She was on a voyage from Glasgow, Renfrewshire to Bunbeg.
Oscar	United Kingdom	The schooner ran aground at Lowestoft, Suffolk. She was on a voyage from Newcastle upon Tyne, Northumberland to Gothenburg, Sweden and Barcelona, Spain. She was refloated and taken in to Lowestoft in a leaky condition.
Plough	United Kingdom	The schooner was driven ashore and wrecked near Worthing, Sussex. Her crew were rescued. She was on a voyage from Whitby, Yorkshire to Arundel, Sussex.
Retzia	Spain	The ship was driven ashore near Visby, Sweden.
White Cloud	United States	The ship was abandoned in the Atlantic Ocean. Her crew were rescued by Trinity (United States). White Cloud was on a voyage from New York to Cádiz, Spain.

== 6 June ==
List of shipwrecks: 6 June 1860
Ship	State	Description
Fourteen	United Kingdom	The brig was driven ashore and wrecked near Framboise, Nova Scotia, British North America. Her crew were rescued. She was on a voyage from "La Garrucha" to Quebec City, Province of Canada, British North America.
Peace and Plenty	United Kingdom	The schooner was wrecked on the Goldstone, in the North Sea off the coast of Northumberland. Her crew were rescued. She was on a voyage from Sunderland, County Durham to Lossiemouth, Moray.
York	United Kingdom	The Mersey Flat was driven ashore near Rhyl, Denbighshire. She was refloated.

== 7 June ==
List of shipwrecks: 7 June 1860
Ship	State	Description
Leonard	United Kingdom	The snow was driven ashore on Saaremaa, Russia. Her fourteen crew survived. She was on a voyage from South Shields, County Durham to Kronstadt, Russia.
Saranse	United Kingdom	The barque was wrecked at Maranhão, Brazil. Her nine crew survived. She was on a voyage from Cardiff, Glamorgan to Maranhão.

== 8 June ==
List of shipwrecks: 8 June 1860
Ship	State	Description
Dulcinée	(United Kingdom of Great Britain and Ireland) British North America	The full-rigged ship was abandoned off Manila, Spanish East Indies. Her 27 crew survived. She was on a voyage from Manila to Hong Kong.
Highland Lassie	(United Kingdom of Great Britain and Ireland) New South Wales	The brig ran aground in the West Channel. She was on a voyage from Newcastle to Melbourne, Victoria. She was refloated and resumed her voyage.
Jane	United Kingdom	The ship collided with Volusiæ (United Kingdom) and foundered in the Bristol Channel 18 nautical miles (33 km) south west of Lundy Island, Devon with the loss of three of her five crew. Survivors were rescued by Volusiæ. Jane was on a voyage from Cardiff, Glamorgan to Exeter, Devon.
Louisa	(United Kingdom of Great Britain and Ireland) New Zealand	The schooner was wrecked on Waiheke Island while en route from Tauranga to Auckland. She hit and stuck on rocks during a storm, with all crew and passengers escaping safely.
Myrtle	United Kingdom	The ship was wrecked on the coast of French Cochinchina. . She was on a voyage from Hong Kong to Siam.

== 9 June ==
List of shipwrecks: 9 June 1860
Ship	State	Description
George and Mary	United States	The ship was wrecked in the ice during a gale in the western Sea of Okhotsk. The crew was saved by the ship Gideon Howland and barques Delaware, Dromo, and Philip 1st (all United States). The cargo of 500 barrels of whale oil was a total loss.
Sea Serpent	United Kingdom	The barque was destroyed by fire in the Atlantic Ocean. Her eleven crew survived. She was on a voyage from Paraíba, Brazil to Liverpool, Lancashire.

== 10 June ==
List of shipwrecks: 10 June 1860
Ship	State	Description
Biene	(flag) Bremen	The ship was driven ashore and wrecked on Gotland, Sweden. Her crew were rescued. She was on a voyage from Bremen to Gävle, Sweden.
Minnet	United Kingdom	The barque was driven ashore near "Surrop". She was on a voyage from Villanova to Kronstadt, Russia. She was later refloated and taken in to Reval, Russia, where she was condemned.

== 11 June ==
List of shipwrecks: 11 June 1860
Ship	State	Description
Albus	United States	The ship foundered in the Atlantic Ocean. Eight crew were rescued by Western Chief (United Kingdom), the remainder took to a boat. Albus was on a voyage from Sunderland, County Durham, United Kingdom to Rio de Janeiro, Brazil.
Asia	United Kingdom	The collier, a brig, was driven ashore in the Elbe. She was on a voyage from Sunderland to Hamburg. She was refloated but consequently sank.
Emerald	United Kingdom	The brig foundered off Cape Palos, Spain. Her nine crew were rescued by the brig Pallade ( Kingdom of Sardinia). Emerald was on a voyage from Palermo, Sicily to Liverpool, Lancashire.
HMS Sidon	Royal Navy	The frigate was driven ashore at "Pomong Harbour". She was subsequently repaired and returned to service.

== 12 June ==
List of shipwrecks: 12 June 1860
Ship	State	Description
Ann	United Kingdom	The brig was driven ashore and wrecked at Alnmouth, Northumberland. Her eight crew were rescued by the Alnmouth Lifeboat. She was on a voyage from Memel, Prussia to Alnmouth.
Express	United Kingdom	The brig ran aground at Scarborough, Yorkshire.
Tuskar	United Kingdom	The steamship ran aground in the River Suir. She was on a voyage from Waterford to Glasgow, Renfrewshire. She was refloated the next day and resumed her voyage.

== 13 June ==
List of shipwrecks: 13 June 1860
Ship	State	Description
HMS Satellite	Royal Navy	The Pearl-class corvette ran aground on a reef in the Pacific Ocean. Subsequently repaired and returned to service.

== 14 June ==
List of shipwrecks: 14 June 1860
Ship	State	Description
Johanna	Netherlands	The galiot was driven ashore north of Malamocco, Kingdom of Lombardy–Venetia. She was on a voyage from London, United Kingdom to Trieste. She was refloated the next day with the assistance of the steamship Olnoch ( Kingdom of Lombardy–Venetia) and taken in to Malamocco.
Squantum	United States	The ship was wrecked at "Allybaugh", near Bombay, India with the loss of three of her crew.
Sylphide	Sweden	The sloop was driven ashore and sank near "Laboer", Prussia. She was on a voyage from Kiel, Prussia to Westerwick, Shetland Islands, United Kingdom. She was refloated and taken in to Kiel.

== 15 June ==
List of shipwrecks: 15 June 1860
Ship	State	Description
Gem	United Kingdom	The ship was driven ashore near Yarmouth, Isle of Wight. She was refloated.

== 16 June ==
List of shipwrecks: 16 June 1860
Ship	State	Description
Rivolen	United Kingdom	The ship was driven ashore and wrecked on the Brandy Pots, in the Saint Lawrence River. She was on a voyage from Quebec City, Province of Canada, British North America to Cardiff, Glamorgan. She had been refloated by 22 June and towed back to Quebec City by the steamship Alma ( (United Kingdom of Great Britain and Ireland) British North America).
Yarborough	United Kingdom	The ship ran aground at Copenhagen, Denmark. She was on a voyage from Grimsby, Lincolnshire to Kronstadt, Russia. She was refloated with assistance from the tug Ossian (Denmark) and resumed her voyage.

== 17 June ==
List of shipwrecks: 17 June 1860
Ship	State	Description
Trois Puissances	United Kingdom	The brigantine foundered in the English Channel 15 nautical miles (28 km) south west of The Lizard, Cornwall, United Kingdom. Her crew survived. She was on a voyage from Llanelly, Glamorgan, United Kingdom to Nantes, Loire-Inférieure.
Tullochgoram	United Kingdom	The barque was wrecked at Vizagapatam, India. Her crew were rescued. She was on a voyage from Coringa, India to Mauritius.

== 18 June ==
List of shipwrecks: 18 June 1860
Ship	State	Description
A. D. Gamage	United Kingdom	The brigantine was wrecked at Mayaguana, Bahamas. She was on a voyage from Aux Cayes, Haiti to New York, United States.
Express	United Kingdom	The smack was wrecked on the Shipwash Sand, in the North Sea off the coast of Suffolk. Her eight crew survived.
Jane Leech	United Kingdom	The ship was wrecked at the Sandheads, India. Her crew were rescued.
Josephine	United Kingdom	The ship ran aground in the Saint Lawrence River. She was on a voyage from Quebec City, Province of Canada, British North America to London. She was refloated.
Southern Cross	(United Kingdom of Great Britain and Ireland) New Zealand	The Melanesian Mission schooner was wrecked at the mouth of the Ngunguru River in New Zealand while en route from Auckland to Melanesia. The grounding occurred in thick fog after several days of strong offshore gales. All crew and passengers survived.
Storm Queen	United Kingdom	The full-rigged ship foundered in the Indian Ocean. Of her 37 crew, 24 were rescued by Hiawatha (United Kingdom) and the rest reached the coast of the Cape Colony in their boat. Storm Queen was on a voyage from Glasgow, Renfrewshire to Kurrachee, India.
Worthy of Devon	United Kingdom	The ship ran aground at Quebec City. She was on a voyage from Quebec City to Calais, France. She was refloated the next day and resumed her voyage.

== 19 June ==
List of shipwrecks: 19 June 1860
Ship	State	Description
Africanus	United Kingdom	The brig was wrecked on St. Anne's Shoals, off the coast of Sierra Leone. Her ten crew survived. She was on a voyage from Bathurst, Gambia Colony and Protectorate to the Cape Coast Castle.

== 20 June ==
List of shipwrecks: 20 June 1860
Ship	State	Description
Castilian Maid	United Kingdom	The schooner foundered in the Atlantic Ocean. Her eight crew survived. she was on a voyage from Cádiz, Spain to Labrador, British North America.
Stamboul	United Kingdom	The full-rigged ship was wrecked 6 nautical miles (11 km) west of Manora Point, India. Her 31vcrew were rescued. She was on a voyage from London to Kurrachee, India.

== 21 June ==
List of shipwrecks: 21 June 1860
Ship	State	Description
Mary Bibby	United Kingdom	The full-rigged ship was wrecked on the Matanilla Reef. Her fifteen crew survived. She was on a voyage from British Honduras to Liverpool, Lancashire.
USCS Robert J. Walker	United States Coast Survey	The sidewheel flange of Robert J. Walker on the bottom of the Atlantic Ocean, photographed by a National Oceanic and Atmospheric Administration dive team on 23 June 2013. The survey ship sank in a collision – probably with the commercial schooner Fanny (flag unknown) – off the coast of New Jersey, 12 nautical miles (22 km) southeast of Absecon Light, with the death of 20 of her crew. The commercial schooner R. G. Porter (flag unknown) rescued her survivors.

== 22 June ==
List of shipwrecks: 22 June 1860
Ship	State	Description
HMS Archer	Royal Navy	The Archer-class sloop ran aground in the Cameroons River, Africa. She was refloated.

== 24 June ==
List of shipwrecks: 24 June 1860
Ship	State	Description
Union	Denmark	The brig was wrecked off West Caicos, Caicos Islands. She was on a voyage from Maracaibo, Venezuela to Altona.

== 25 June ==
List of shipwrecks: 25 June 1860
Ship	State	Description
Betsey	United Kingdom	The sloop ran aground in the Rock Channel. She was refloated on 27 June and towed in to Liverpool, Lancashire.
Curlew	United Kingdom	The schooner was driven ashore and wrecked on the west coast of the Mull of Galloway, Argyllshire. Her crew were rescued. She was on a voyage from Belfast, County Antrim to Maryport, Cumberland.
Jane Henderson	United States	The ship was driven ashore and wrecked 25 nautical miles (46 km) south of Cape Henry, Virginia. She was on a voyage from Liverpool to Baltimore, Maryland.

== 27 June ==
List of shipwrecks: 27 June 1860
Ship	State	Description
Augusta C. Brewer	United Kingdom	The schooner ran aground on the West Hoyle, in Liverpool Bay. Seven of her ten crew were taken off by the Point of Aire Lifeboat. She was on a voyage from Liverpool, Lancashire to Havana, Cuba.
Henry Warren	United Kingdom	The ship ran aground and was wrecked at Nuevitas, Cuba.
Mary Ann	United Kingdom)	The schooner was wrecked on the Shipwash Sand, in the North Sea off the coast of Suffolk. Her crew were rescued by the smack Agenoria (United Kingdom). Mary Ann was on a voyage from South Shields, County Durham to Dartmouth, Devon.
Scotland	United Kingdom	The full-rigged ship was wrecked on a reef off Montgomery Point, British Cape Colony. Her 23 crew were rescued. She was on a voyage from Aden to Pensacola, Florida, United States.

== 28 June ==
List of shipwrecks: 28 June 1860
Ship	State	Description
Helene	Hamburg	The barque was wrecked on the Britto Shoal, off the coast of French Cochinchina. Her crew were rescued by a Chinese junk. She was on a voyage from Saigon, French Cochinchina to Hong Kong.
John Henry	United Kingdom	The ship was driven ashore near Nuevitas, Cuba.

== 30 June ==
List of shipwrecks: 30 June 1860
Ship	State	Description
Union	United Kingdom	The sloop was lost off Caister-on-Sea, Norfolk. All five people on board were rescued by the lugger Refuge (United Kingdom). Union was on a voyage from Wisbech, Cambridgeshire to Brussels, West Flanders, Belgium.

== Unknown date ==
List of shipwrecks: Unknown date in June 1860
Ship	State	Description
Comet	United Kingdom	The schooner was driven ashore on the Mull of Kintyre, Argyllshire before 23 June.
Condor	Prussia	The barque foundered in the North Sea before 7 June. She was on a voyage from London, United Kingdom to Danzig.
Fides	United Kingdom	The ship was wrecked on Kangaroo Island, South Australia before 19 June. She was on a voyage from London to Adelaide, South Australia.
Hamburg	Flag unknown	The ship was driven ashore near Kurrachee, India.
Lustre	United Kingdom	The ship was abandoned in the North Sea. Her crew survived. She was on a voyage from North Shields, County Durham to Rochester, Kent.
Maria	United Kingdom	The barque was driven ashore at the Gamarigbe Mountains. She was on a voyage from Montevideo, Uruguay to the Rio Grande.
Salonica	United Kingdom	The ship was driven ashore at Terranova before 7 June. She was on a voyage from Alexandria, Egypt to Liverpool, Lancashire.
Sarah and Emma	United Kingdom	The ship foundered in the South Atlantic. Her crew were rescued by HMS Tribune (Royal Navy). Sarah and Emma was on a voyage from Callao, Peru to Queenstown, County Cork.
Vauquelin	France	The ship was wrecked "on the York" before 25 June. She was on a voyage from Havre de Grâce, Seine-Inférieure to Montevideo.
Walker	United States	The steamship was run into and sunk off the coast of New Jersey with the loss of about twenty lives.
