= St George's Channel (disambiguation) =

St George's Channel is the sea channel between Ireland and Wales, connecting the Irish Sea to the Celtic Sea.

St George's Channel may also refer to:

- St. George's Channel (Papua New Guinea), a sea channel between New Ireland and New Britain
- St. George's Channel, Nova Scotia, a community in Canada
- Sfântu Gheorghe branch of the Danube Delta
