= Framboise, Nova Scotia =

Community in Nova Scotia, Canada

Coordinates: 45°43′8.85″N 60°21′44.35″W

Framboise in Nova Scotia

Framboise (/fræmˈbwɑːz/; French for 'Raspberry') is a small community in the Canadian province of Nova Scotia, located in Richmond County. It lies to the southwest of the Framboise River.

== Geography ==
This settlement lies on St. Peters Fourchu Road, a 50-kilometre road stretching from L'Ardoise to Fourchu. From St. Peters Fourchu Road, multiple smaller roads branch off towards beaches and scattered houses. The settlement is approximately 65 kilometres from Sydney, the largest urban centre in Cape Breton.

Framboise sits on largely flat terrain, with the elevation decreasing towards the coast of the Atlantic Ocean. The average elevation in Framboise is 23 metres above sea level, with the minimum elevation in Framboise being four metres below sea level and a maximum elevation of 90 metres above sea level.

=== Natural features ===
Natural features in Framboise include lakes, coves, ponds, and a beach. Lakes in the Framboise area include MacKinnons Lake, Crooked Lake, Church Lake, Bagnells Lake, and Framboise Round Lake, with some lakes being substantially larger than others. Other lakes, including Fox Cove Lake and Seal Rock Lake, are located closer to the coast of the Atlantic Ocean, some being a few dozen metres from the ocean.

Ponds in the Framboise area include English Pond and the MacLeods Ponds, both being very small. Framboise also features McLeods Cove and Shooting Cove, both being within five kilometres of the Atlantic Ocean.

Framboise also has a beach, Morrisons Beach (also known as Framboise Beach). The sandy beach is approximately eight kilometres long, and has two guts on each side of the beach.
