= Kempt Road, Nova Scotia =

Community in Nova Scotia, Canada

Coordinates: 45°39′11.41″N 61°9′42.29″W

Kempt Road in Nova Scotia

Kempt Road is a small community in the Canadian province of Nova Scotia, located in Richmond County on Cape Breton Island.

== Origin of name ==
Kempt Road is named after General Sir James Kempt, who served as Lieutenant-Governor of Nova Scotia from 1820 to 1828, about the time this area was first settled by Europeans.
