= Dundee, Nova Scotia =

Community in Nova Scotia, Canada

Coordinates: 45°41′48.58″N 61°6′6.61″W

Dundee in Nova Scotia

Dundee (Scottish Gaelic: Dùn Dé) is a small community in the Canadian province of Nova Scotia, located in Richmond County on Cape Breton Island, and named after the city of Dundee in Scotland. Dundee is most known for the Dundee Resort and Golf Club, located on the West Bay.

== Dundee Resort and Golf Club ==
The Dundee Resort and Golf Club is located on the Bras d'Or Lakes. The resort was amongst the list of 20 Must See Places in National Geographic Traveler's Best of the World Guide in 2013.

In January 2016, it was released that the resort would be put up for sale for an asking price of 2.5 million dollars.

== Parks ==
- Dundee Provincial Park
