= Johnstown, Nova Scotia =

Community in Nova Scotia, Canada

Coordinates: 45°47′12.04″N 60°44′17.73″W

Johnstown in Nova Scotia

Johnstown (Scottish Gaelic: Baile Iain; Mi'kmaq: Nemtegowak) is a small community in the Canadian province of Nova Scotia, located in Richmond County on Cape Breton Island. The altar in the vestry of Sacred Heart Church in Johnstown is reported to have come from Fortress Louisbourg before the final siege.

== Royal Canadian Ordnance Corps Depot Johnstown ==
A large concrete reserve ammunition magazine for the major naval gun batteries in Sydney Harbour and Canso Strait was built at Johnstown. Opened in the fall of 1943, the complex consisted of 3 magazines, similar to the ones at Debert, Nova Scotia and McGivney, New Brunswick. Post-War, the site was used as a sub-depot of No, 31 Ordnance Depot in Debert, staffed by a single Private. The depot closed on 18 March 1957. All that remains is the laboratory building on the west side of Highway 4, south of Johnstown, now a private residence.
