= French Cove, Nova Scotia =

Community in Nova Scotia, Canada

Coordinates: 45°42′2.39″N 60°50′6.43″W

French Cove in Nova Scotia

French Cove is a small community in the Canadian province of Nova Scotia, located in Richmond County.
