= Whiteside, Nova Scotia =

Community in Nova Scotia, Canada

Coordinates: 45°36′12.49″N 61°10′28.64″W

Whiteside in Nova Scotia

Whiteside is a small community in the Canadian province of Nova Scotia, located Richmond County on Cape Breton Island.
