= Cape George =

Cape George may refer to:

- Cape George, Antigonish County, Nova Scotia
- Cape George, Richmond County, Nova Scotia
- Cape George, Washington
- Cape George (South Georgia)
