= Hureauville, Nova Scotia =

Community in Nova Scotia, Canada

Coordinates: 45°38′4.44″N 61°14′5.55″W

Hureauville in Nova Scotia

Hureauville is a small community in the Canadian province of Nova Scotia, located in Richmond County.
