= Lake Uist, Nova Scotia =

Community in Nova Scotia, Canada

Coordinates: 45°45′53.6″N 60°36′41.66″W

Lake Uist in Nova Scotia

Lake Uist is a small community in the Canadian province of Nova Scotia, located in Richmond County.
