= Head of Loch Lomond, Nova Scotia =

Locality in Nova Scotia, Canada

Coordinates: 45°43′42.5″N 60°36′0.87″W

Head of Loch Lomond in Nova Scotia

Head of Loch Lomond is a locality in the Canadian province of Nova Scotia, located in Richmond County.
