= Little Anse, Nova Scotia =

Community in Nova Scotia, Canada

Coordinates: 45°29′38.45″N 60°56′5.63″W

Petit Anse in Nova Scotia

Little Anse (also known as Petite Anse and Petit Anse) is a small community in the Canadian province of Nova Scotia, located in Richmond County.

The village of Petite Anse is one of the oldest communities in Isle Madame, in Cape Breton, dating back to the 18th century.
