= Port Malcolm, Nova Scotia =

Community in Nova Scotia, Canada

Coordinates: 45°34′47″N 61°16′49″W

Port Malcolm in Nova Scotia

Port Malcolm is a community in the Canadian province of Nova Scotia, located in Richmond County.
