= Thibeauville, Nova Scotia =

Community in Nova Scotia, Canada

Coordinates: 45°38′40.63″N 60°59′18.28″W

Thibeauville in Nova Scotia

Thibeauville is a small community in the Canadian province of Nova Scotia, located in Richmond County.
