= Janvrin Island Peninsula, Nova Scotia =

Community in Nova Scotia, Canada

Coordinates: 45°32′11.96″N 61°10′11.33″W

Janvrin Island Peninsula in Nova Scotia

Janvrin Island Peninsula is a small community in the Canadian province of Nova Scotia, located in Richmond County.
