= Cape Auguet =

Community in Nova Scotia, Canada

Coordinates: 45°29′7.48″N 61°1′23.58″W

Cape Auguet in Nova Scotia

Cape Auguet is a small community in the Canadian province of Nova Scotia, located in Richmond County on Isle Madame.
