= Grantville, Nova Scotia =

Community in Nova Scotia, Canada

Coordinates: 45°39′1.9″N 61°14′21″W

Grantville in Nova Scotia

Grantville is a small community in the Canadian province of Nova Scotia, located in Richmond County.
