= Walkersville (disambiguation) =

Walkersville may refer to:

- Walkersville, Georgia, an unincorporated community
- Walkersville, Maryland, a town in Frederick County
- Walkersville, Missouri, an unincorporated community in Shelby County
- Walkersville, West Virginia, an unincorporated community in Lewis County

== See also ==
- Walkerville (disambiguation)
