= Barra Head, Nova Scotia =

Community in Nova Scotia, Canada

Coordinates: 45°40′45.55″N 60°46′54.7″W

Barra Head in Nova Scotia

Barra Head (Scottish Gaelic: Beàrnaraigh; named after Barra Head in Scotland) is a small community in the Canadian province of Nova Scotia, located in Richmond County on Cape Breton Island. Barra Head surrounds a small inlet called Salmon River, which was the old name for Barra Head being salmon river had to be changed because it was far too common and the post office had trouble locating people.

Salmon River Was historically used as a location for the construction of wooden sailing ship. It still has a deeper bottom, from ship builders trenching the bottom to increase access for ship building.
