= Sampsons Cove =

Community in Nova Scotia, Canada

Coordinates: 45°30′10.07″N 60°56′7.17″W

Sampsons Cove in Nova Scotia

Sampsons Cove is a small community in the Canadian province of Nova Scotia, located on Isle Madame in Richmond County.
