= Grandique Ferry, Nova Scotia =

Community in Nova Scotia, Canada

Coordinates: 45°36′1.25″N 61°2′25.38″W

Grandique Ferry in Nova Scotia

Grandique Ferry is a former community in Richmond County, Nova Scotia.

Currently classed a "locality" by the provincial government, it is situated on the northern shore of the Lennox Passage near Louisdale, opposite Grandique Point on Isle Madame.

The name "Grandique" is derived from the French meaning for "big ditch" or "big bank".

== History ==
Grand Digue Ferry was a mission of Arichat in the early 19th century. There is a Grandique on Isle Madame, which claimed they had the mission. It was Grandique Ferry that had the mission according to Bishop John Cameron, in an article in the May 22, 1969, edition of the Antigonish Casket. It was about the History of L'Ardoise Parish. He wrote that the idea was eventually when a cleric was available to establish a parish to administer to the people of St. Peters Bay area from Grand Digue Ferry to L'Ardoise. The Diocese was in Arichat from 1844 to 1886. The seat of the diocese was transferred to Antigonish around 1886 and it happened under Bishop John Cameron.

According to mission records Grandique Ferry had population of 76 in 1821. There were 44 adults and 32 children. River Bourgeois had a population of 58 in 1821. This wouldn't be the back road of Grandique on the Island. River Bourgeois was an established community since the late 18th century.

In the summer of 1827, news that a new road was about to be built between the Grandique Ferry harbour on the Lennox Passage and the Ship Harbour road. The Harbour in 1827 was known as the Grandique Ferry . Travel to Arichat, the Gut of Canso and points west would soon become more tolerable.

According to the 1861 census, there were 13 polling stations in Richmond County, Nova Scotia. Grandique Ferry (Louisdale) had no polling station. It was in with D'Escousse, because all of route 320 was in this polling station. D'Escousse had a population of 1173 in 1861. In 1881, D'Escousse had a population of 1492. In 1956, it was only 228. In 1956, they counted the population of Louisdale and other places on route 320 separate. Louisdale had a population of 736 in 1956. The combined total of seven other places on route 320 had population of 937 in 1956. Louisdale's (Grandique Ferry) population was added with all the route 320 places in the 19th century.

According Marriages from the Nova Scotia Board of Statistics compiled by the Nova Scotia government, there was a church in Grandique Ferry in 1886. Maude Fixott and Nicholas White from PEI were married in Grandique Ferry on September 7, 1886.

== Early 20th century ==
In the early 20th century, Grandique Ferry was still a separate settlement in Richmond County, Nova Scotia. In the Journal of Education book by the Nova Scotia Department of Education in 1905, they mention the places with schools in Richmond County. No.18. was Grandique Ferry. The next one was No. 21 Basin. There was no Barachios St. Louis or Louisdale. In the Journal of Education book by the Nova Scotia Department of Education in 1908, they mention the list of schools in Richmond County. They had No. 18 Grandique Ferry and No. 19 was Louisdale.

The Louisdale area was known as Barachois St. Louis. The name was changed by act of the provincial legislature on April 7, 1905. The Act stated, " The settlement or district in the county of Richmond, now known as Barachois, St. Louis, shall hereafter be known and designated Louisdale".
