= Sporting Mountain, Nova Scotia =

Locality in Nova Scotia, Canada

Coordinates: 45°40′1.94″N 60°58′59.43″W

Sporting Mountain in Nova Scotia

Sporting Mountain is a locality in the Canadian province of Nova Scotia, located in Richmond County.
