= Lower L'Ardoise, Nova Scotia =

Community in Nova Scotia, Canada

Coordinates: 45°36′14″N 60°44′11.24″W

Lower L'Ardoise in Nova Scotia

Lower L'Ardoise is a small community in the Canadian province of Nova Scotia, located in Richmond County.
