= Red Islands, Nova Scotia =

Community in Nova Scotia, Canada

Coordinates: 45°45′43.25″N 60°44′38.74″W

Red Islands in Nova Scotia

Red Islands (Scottish Gaelic: Na h-Eileanan Dearga; Mi'kmaq: Gwesaosek) is a small community in the Canadian province of Nova Scotia, located in Richmond County.
