= MacMullin Lake =

Lake in Nova Scotia, Canada

- Location within Nova Scotia
- Location: Cape Breton Regional Municipality, Nova Scotia
- Coordinates: 45°57′40″N 60°6′37″W
- Basin countries: Canada

MacMullin Lake is a lake of Cape Breton Regional Municipality, Nova Scotia, Canada.

MacMullin Lake (CAWZJ) is at 45.779913°N 60.312048°W. MacMullin Lake is in the Framboise River watershed. It is connected to MacArthurs Lake (CAWDS) by a channel. Downstream it connects to Middle Lake. The lake is visible through the trees from the Grand Mira North Road.

== See also ==
- List of lakes in Nova Scotia

== Sources ==
- Faubert, Victor Maurice (2008), MacArthurs Lake
- Faubert, Victor Maurice (2008b), MacMullin Lake
- MacMullin Lake, Natural Resources Canada
