= ABFC Cape St. George =

Cape-class patrol boat of the Australian Border Force

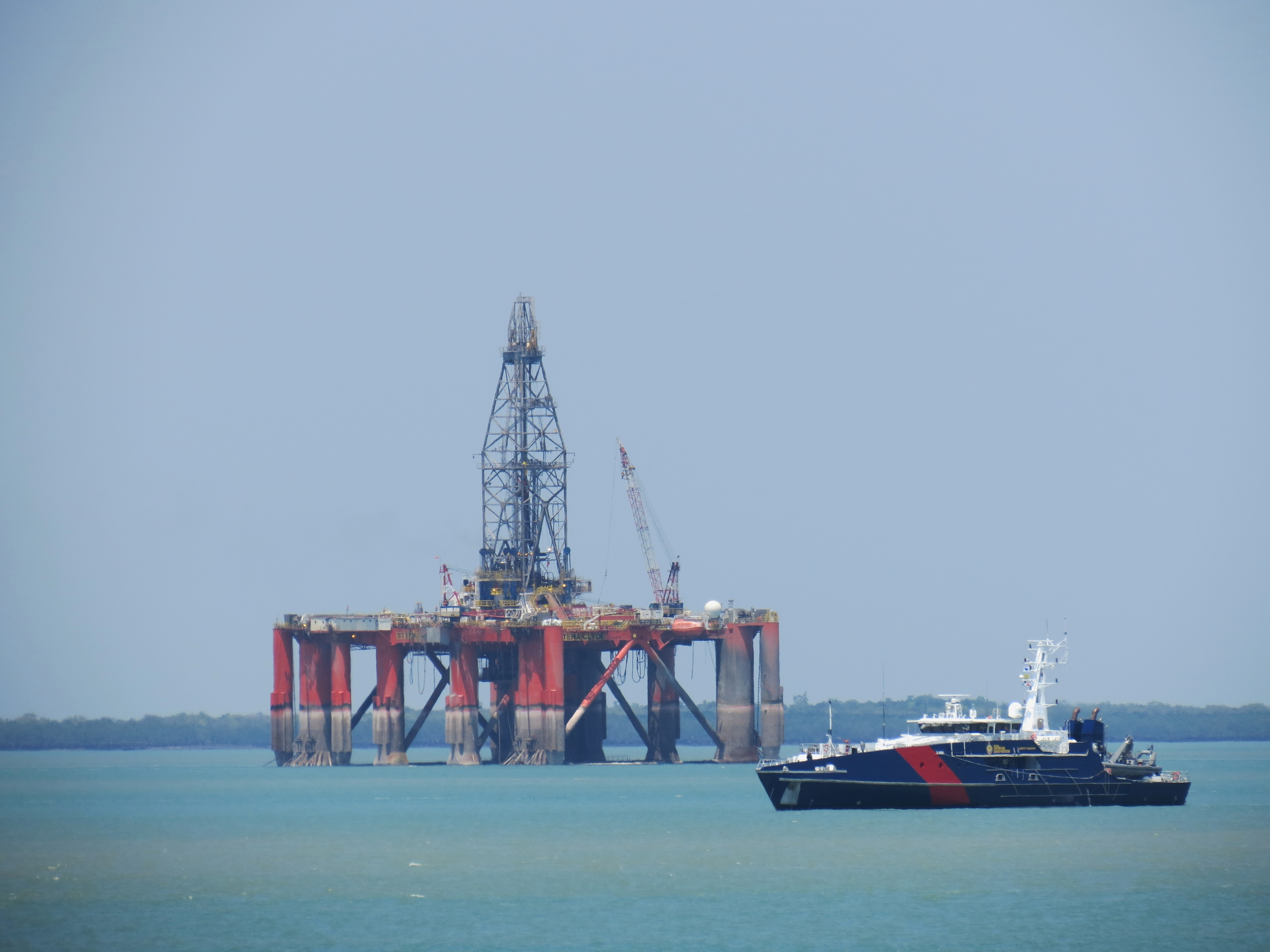
- ABFC Cape St. George in Darwin Harbour in September 2013

History

Australia
- Namesake: Cape St. George
- Builder: Austal, Henderson, Western Australia
- Commissioned: 2013
- Identification: IMO number: 9665774; MMSI number: 503750000; Callsign: VHIL

General characteristics
- Class & type: Cape-class patrol boat
- Length: 57.8 m (189 ft 8 in)
- Beam: 10.3 m (33 ft 10 in)
- Draught: 3 m (9 ft 10 in)
- Propulsion: 2 x Caterpillar 3516C main engines with output of 2,525 kW (3,386 hp)
- Speed: 25 knots (46 km/h; 29 mph)
- Range: 4,000 nmi (7,400 km; 4,600 mi) at 12 knots (22 km/h; 14 mph)
- Complement: 18
- Armament: 2 × 12.7 mm (0.5 in) machine guns

ABFC Cape St. George, named after Cape St. George in the Jervis Bay Territory, is a Cape-class patrol boat of the marine unit of the Australian Border Force.

The ship was the first of eight Cape-class patrol boats to be delivered to the Australian Border Force. The boat, built by Austal in Henderson, Western Australia, had its keel laid in June 2012, was launched in January 2013 and received its name two month later.

Austal was awarded a $350 million contract to construct eight Cape-class patrol boats for the Australian Border Force to replace the Bay-class patrol boats in 2011, with the eight boats delivered between 2013 and 2015.
