= Grande Greve, Nova Scotia =

Community in Nova Scotia, Canada

Coordinates: 45°37′54.5″N 60°50′42.42″W

Grande Greve in Nova Scotia

Grande Greve is a small community in the Canadian province of Nova Scotia, located in Richmond County.
