= Point Michaud, Nova Scotia =

Community in Nova Scotia, Canada

Coordinates: 45°35′19.52″N 60°41′26.55″W

Point Michaud in Nova Scotia

Point Michaud is a small community in the Canadian province of Nova Scotia, located in Richmond County.
