= Salmon River, Richmond County =

Community in Nova Scotia, Canada

Coordinates: 45°38′37.28″N 60°46′42.96″W

Salmon River in Nova Scotia

Salmon River is a small community in the Canadian province of Nova Scotia, located in Richmond County.
