= Walkerville, Nova Scotia =

Community in Nova Scotia, Canada

Coordinates: 45°36′4.6″N 61°12′46.91″W

Walkerville in Nova Scotia

Walkerville is a small community in the Canadian province of Nova Scotia, located in Richmond County.
