= Cape George, Richmond County, Nova Scotia =

Cape and community in Nova Scotia, Canada

Coordinates: 45.736479°N 60.813534°W

Cape George in Nova Scotia

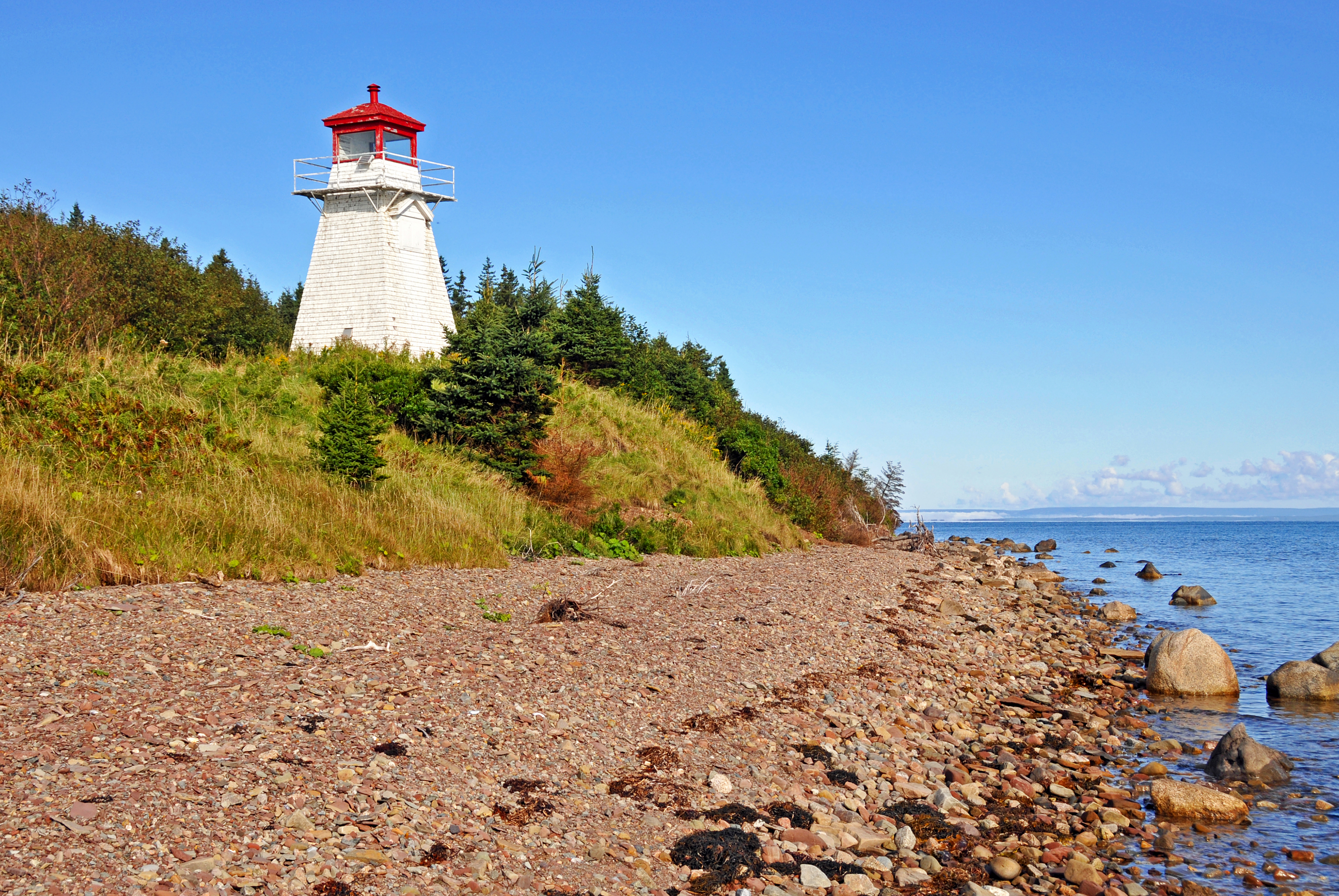
Cape George Lighthouse, built in 1950 marks the north entrance to St. Peter's Inlet which leads to St. Peters Canal.

Cape George is a cape and community on the shores of Bras d'Or Lake in Richmond County, Nova Scotia, Canada.
