= Lower St. Esprit, Nova Scotia =

Locality in Nova Scotia, Canada

Coordinates: 45°40′12.09″N 60°28′25.73″W

Lower St. Esprit in Nova Scotia

Lower St. Esprit is a locality in the Canadian province of Nova Scotia, located in Richmond County.
