= St. Georges Channel, Nova Scotia =

Community in Nova Scotia, Canada

Coordinates: 45°43′3.02″N 61°2′51.64″W

St. Georges Channel in Nova Scotia

St. Georges Channel is a small community in the Canadian province of Nova Scotia, located in Richmond County.
