= Evanston, Nova Scotia =

Community in Nova Scotia, Canada

Coordinates: 45°37′3.07″N 61°13′0.66″W

Evanston in Nova Scotia

Evanston is a small community in the Canadian province of Nova Scotia, located in Richmond, Subd. A in Richmond County on Cape Breton Island.

== Climate ==
This climatic region is typified by large seasonal temperature differences, with warm to hot (and often humid) summers and cold (sometimes severely cold) winters. According to the Köppen Climate Classification system, Evanston, Nova Scotia has a humid continental climate, abbreviated "Dfb" on climate maps.
