= St. Esprit, Nova Scotia =

Community in Nova Scotia, Canada

Coordinates: 45°38′7.46″N 60°32′36.32″W

St. Esprit in Nova Scotia

St. Esprit is a small community located in Richmond County on the south shore of Cape Breton Island, Nova Scotia. It is situated between Louisbourg, to the east, and St. Peter's, to the west. The community is loosely centered on St. Esprit Lake and is sparsely populated. It was once a Mi'kmaq gathering place called Asukadich, which means "place of clams" or "clam gathering place."

== History ==
During the final phase of French colonial interests in North America, St. Esprit was a fishing enclave of moderate import. As a viable community, it existed from about 1713 to 1758. It was under the administrative control of the French fortress at Louisbourg.

The precise location of the original settlement is uncertain, although descriptions suggest that some homes were located on land just north of the waterway linking St. Esprit Lake with Narrow Pond to the west. This would have placed the main part of the settlement near the narrow inlet that presently links St. Esprit Lake with the Atlantic Ocean. However, it is likely that other homesteads were scattered around the lake shore. St. Esprit Lake is a barachois, that is, a salt-water lake separated from the ocean by a sandbar or a narrow strip of land.

In conjunction with the signing of the Treaty of Utrecht in 1713, French settlers began to move south from Newfoundland, especially from the area of Plaisance, swelling population centers under the protection of Louisbourg. Among these new settlers was Pierre Bonnain Lachaume, who arrived in St. Esprit before 1716, and who acted as the King’s intendant and harbor master until his death in 1730. The Perres and Guyon families were also prominent residents within the new settlement. The St. Esprit Catholic Church, also known as the Church of the Coast of the Evangelical, was founded about 1724. According to the book, Control and Order in French Colonial Louisbourg: "In 1734 there were 234 residents; three years later there were 546."

The most important industry in St. Esprit was the cod fishery. This was conducted out of shallops, small coastal sailing vessels of shallow draft, capable of running the narrow inlet leading to the settlement. Louisbourg merchant, Miguel Daccarrette, maintained part of his fishing fleet at St. Esprit. The Book La Peche de la Morue a l'Ile Royale, 1713-1758, contains the following mention of the fishery at St. Esprit. “Resident fishermen certainly also had to maintain their own storehouses. Erosion by the sea, especially during the storms of winter, constituted the main cause of damage to storehouses situated near the edge of the water.... Without annual repairs, other fish storehouses on Ile Royale would have suffered the same fate as those of Pierre Bonnain at St. Esprit.”

As the French grip on Île Royale (Cape Breton) faltered during the 1740s and 1750s, life in St. Esprit became increasingly uncertain. In preparation for the 1745 siege of Louisbourg, in April of that year, naval vessels from New England shelled and partially destroyed St. Esprit. It is probable that, during this period, additional raids occurred. While the settlement was rebuilt, the population never rebounded to levels seen during the 1730s. According to Endgame 1758: The Promise, the Glory, and the Despair of Louisbourg's Last Decade:

"The war that had descended on Ile Royale was still on everyone's mind in 1749-50, as was the possibility of another conflict .... [T]he Anglo-American campaign had brought about ... the destruction of most of the outlying settlements in the colony. When the French returned in 1749, they reoccupied the fishing outports immediately to the north of Louisbourg in smaller numbers than before 1745. There was a similar drop in the population of St. Esprit, to the south of Louisbourg."

In 1752, St. Esprit was composed of some 14 families totaling about 75 persons. According to Sieur de la Roque, who performed the 1752 census:

"St. Esprit is well settled. It is adapted to the cod fishery, the raising of cattle, and for gardening, the soil being sandy in character. The harbor of St. Esprit is in truth an open roadstead. Its mouth lies east-north-east and west-south-west. Vessels of sixty or seventy tons can enter and anchor in the middle of the roadstead with from ten to twelve fathoms of water at high tide. There are two reefs which one leaves; the one on the starboard and the other on the larboard. Behind the roadstead is a Barachois which runs inland in a north-westerly direction for about a league. The settlers cut what hay they require on the banks of this Barachois. Its mouth lies north-east and south-west. There is sufficient water at high tide to allow for the passage of a boat laden with five or six cords of wood. All the lands in the neighborhood of St. Esprit are covered with fir wood only."

With the final fall of the French garrison at Louisbourg, in 1758, St. Esprit was doomed and the population rapidly disbursed. Some residents took to the forest, living with the native Mi’kmaq people, some returned to France, others were captured by the English and were imprisoned or deported. Following the destruction of the original settlement, the area never regained its status as a fishing center. The region was gradually resettled by Scottish émigrés and other arrivals from the British Islands. In 1881, St. Esprit was described as a post settlement with a population of about 100. “It has a Presbyterian church, a grist mill, and a store.”

== Climate ==
St. Esprit has a humid continental climate (Köppen climate classification Dfb). Temperature gradients are moderated by the nearby Atlantic Ocean and therefore winter temperatures are milder along the Atlantic coast when compared to the inland areas of Nova Scotia.

Weather data from Louisbourg, NS (closest weather station) for 2020/2021 winter: December 2020- (Avg High:5.7/Avg Low: -0.9)--->Daily Avg: 2.4 January 2021- (Avg High:2.0/Avg Low: -4.2)--->Daily Avg: -1.1 February 2021- (Avg High:1.1/Avg Low: -6.4)--->Daily Avg: -2.65 If all future winters for the climate period 2021-2050 average out to equal or exceed these above monthly averages, then St. Esprit would be classified as having an oceanic climate for the period of 2021-2050 (i.e. if using the -3 isotherm for the coldest month according to Köppen climate classification for oceanic climates). This of course would only occur if the mean temperature for the warmest month stays below 22 Celsius (when averaged out for the 2021-2050 period) or else it would instead be classified as humid subtropical (Cfa). Again note that there is no weather station for St. Esprit specifically that Environment Canada lists for historical weather data, so our best estimate uses weather data from Louisbourg.

St. Esprit (along with several other areas close to the Atlantic coast of NS) is predicted to transition to a Humid Subtropical Climate for 2071-2100.
