= Hay Cove, Nova Scotia =

Community in Nova Scotia, Canada

Coordinates: 45°44′18.09″N 60°43′28.6″W

Hay Cove in Nova Scotia

Hay Cove (kalnotek) is a small community in the Canadian province of Nova Scotia, located in Richmond County.
