= Nova Scotia Department of Education and Early Childhood Development =

Government department

Department of Education and Early Childhood Development
Government department overview
- Formed: 1953; 73 years ago
- Minister responsible: Becky Druhan

The Nova Scotia Department of Education and Early Childhood Development is a department of the Government of Nova Scotia responsible for overseeing education institutions in the province. Becky Druhan is the current Minister of Education.

== History ==
In 1949, a minister and deputy minister of education were appointed, and the former Council of Public Instruction (which oversaw the Education Office) was abolished. The Department of Education was established in 1953.

It was renamed Department of Education and Culture in 1994 when it took on the responsibilities of the former Department of Tourism and Culture. It was renamed Department of Education in 1999 when the tourism and culture portfolios were again made the responsibilities of a separate department.

In 2013, the department took over early childhood development services from the Department of Community Services, and gained its present name.

== Mandate ==
The Department of Education mandate spans the education system from school entry through to all post-secondary destinations.

The education system is separated into public schools (Grades Primary to 12) and post-secondary (colleges and universities).

All children must begin school in the year they reach 5 years of age (Grade Primary).

== Organizational structure ==
The Department of Education is headed by an elected official appointed by the Premier:

- Minister of Education: Hon. Becky Druhan

and by a senior civil servant called a Deputy Minister:

- Deputy Minister: Elwin LeRoux

The Department of Education is composed of several operational units, including:

- Acadian and French Language Services
- Public Schools
  - African Canadian Services
  - Education Quality Services
  - English Program Services
  - Equity and Special Projects
  - Evaluation Services
  - French Second Language Services
  - Learning Resources & Technology Services
  - Mi'kmaq Liaison Office
  - Regional Education Service
  - School Board Labour Relations
  - Student Services
- Corporate Policy
  - Agencies, Boards and Commissions
  - Departmental Library
  - Freedom of Information and Protection of Privacy
  - Publishing
- Corporate Services
  - Facilities Management
  - Finance
  - Information Technology
  - Statistics and Data Management
  - Teacher Certification
- Higher Education
  - Post-secondary Disability Services
  - Private Career Colleges
  - Provincial Library
  - Student Assistance
  - Universities and Colleges

In 2008 the Department of Education underwent significant structural change with the creation of the new Department of Labour and Workforce Development. The former Skills and Learning branch has moved into this new department.

== See also ==
- School districts in Nova Scotia
- Education in Canada
- Nova Scotia Community College system
