= Grande Anse, Nova Scotia =

Community in Nova Scotia, Canada

Coordinates: 45°37′29.11″N 61°4′6.42″W

Grand Anse in Nova Scotia

Grande Anse is a small community in the Canadian province of Nova Scotia, located in Richmond County. It is on the north side of Lennox Passage. It was settled in the early 19th century. A school was opened in 1832 and a postal way office was established in 1862. In 1956, the population was 125.
