= Fourchu, Nova Scotia =

Community in Nova Scotia, Canada

Coordinates: 45°42′55.9″N 60°15′40.98″W

Fourchu in Nova Scotia

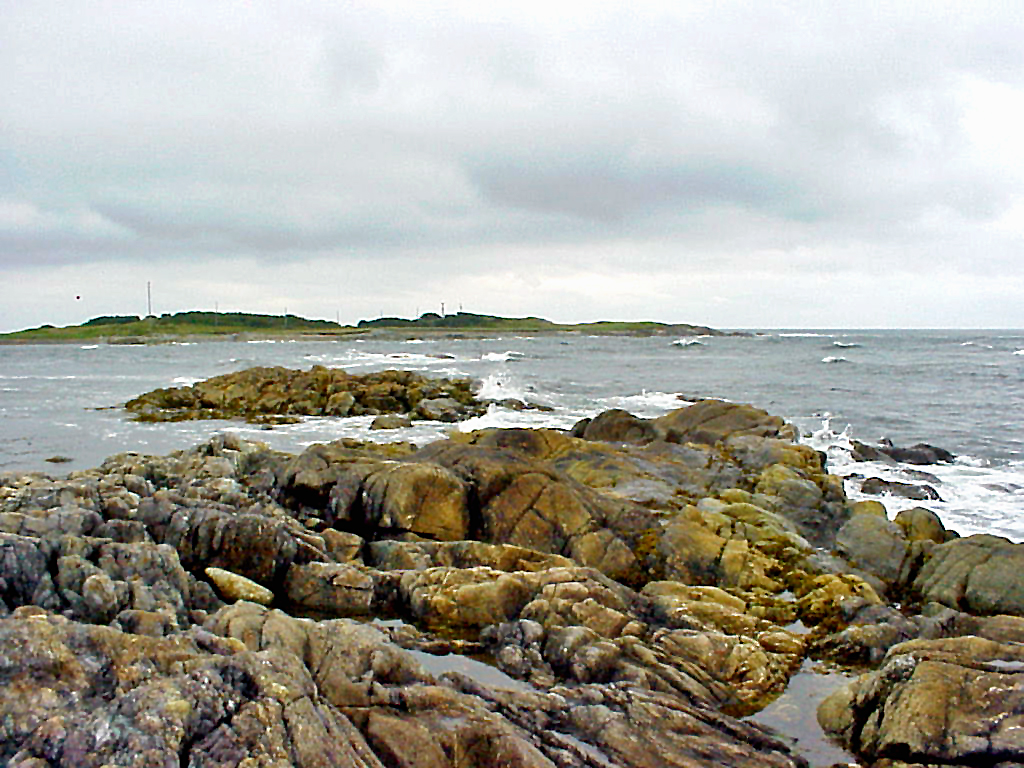
Fourchu Head Lighthouse

Fourchu (/ˈfɔːrʃuː/ FOR-shoo) is a small community in the Canadian province of Nova Scotia, located in Richmond County on Cape Breton Island.

Fourchu is a small fishing community on the southeast coast of Cape Breton Island in Richmond County, Nova Scotia. Located along a rocky coastline, the community has a long connection to fishing and the surrounding waters.

The Fourchu Head Lighthouse was established in 1907 and has served as a navigational landmark along the coast. The area is also associated with the Iceland II, a Souris-based fishing dragger that ran aground during a February 1967 storm, resulting in the deaths of ten crew members.

Local folklore in Fourchu includes the legend of the Fourchu Rammer, a large great white shark that terrorized fishing boats during the summer of 1953, including an incident that resulted in the death of a fisherman. The story remains one of the community’s best known maritime legends.
