= L'Ardoise =

Community in Nova Scotia, Canada

Coordinates: 45°36′6.8″N 60°44′41.9″W

L'Ardoise in Nova Scotia

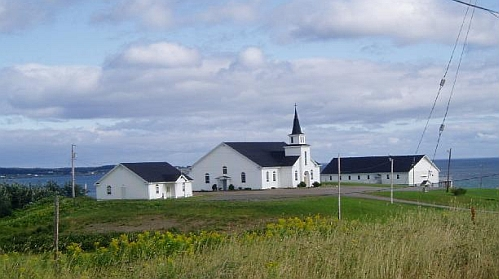

L'Ardoise is a small community in the Canadian province of Nova Scotia, located in Richmond County on Cape Breton Island.

The community has a rich history of French and Acadian culture.
