= Richmond County, Nova Scotia =

Richmond County Comté de Richmond (French) Siorramachd Richmond (Scottish Gaelic)
- County
- Seal

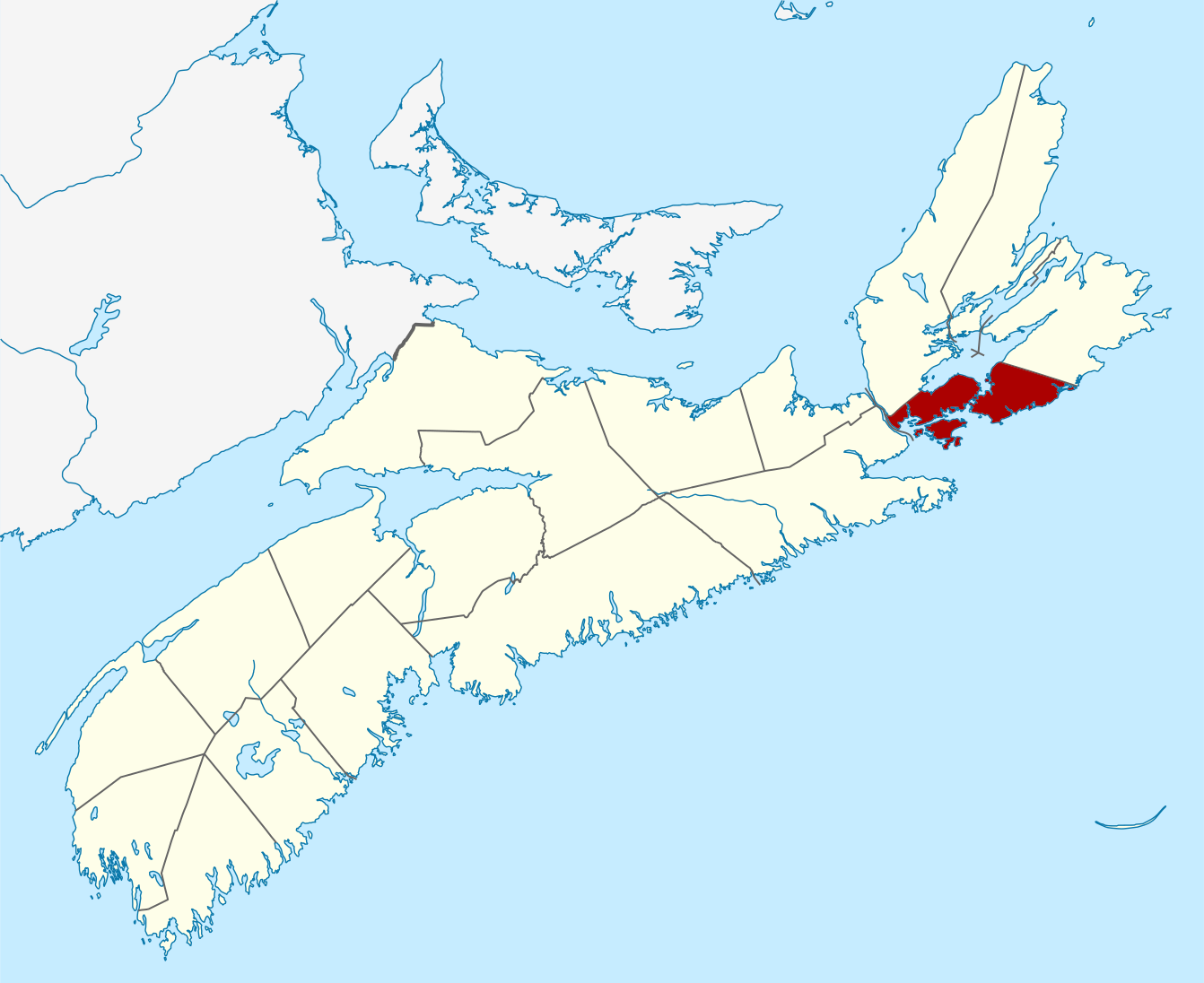
- Location of Richmond County, Nova Scotia
- Coordinates: 45.7°N 60.8°W
- Country: Canada
- Province: Nova Scotia
- Established: 1835
- Incorporated: 1879
- Electoral Districts Federal: Cape Breton—Canso
- Provincial: Cape Breton-Richmond

Government
  - Type: Municipality of the County of Richmond
  - Warden: Jason MacLean

Area
  - Land: 1,246.08 km^{2} (481.11 sq mi)

Population (2021)
  - Total: 8,914
  - Density: 7.2/km^{2} (19/sq mi)
  - Change 2016-21: ▼0.6%
- Time zone: UTC-4 (AST)
  - Summer (DST): UTC-3 (ADT)
- Area code: 902
- Dwellings: 5,122
- Median income*: CA$40,188
- Website: www.richmondcounty.ca
- Median household income, 2005 (all households)

Richmond County is a historical county and census division of Nova Scotia, Canada. Local government is provided by the Municipality of the County of Richmond.

== History ==
Named in honour of Charles Lennox, 4th Duke of Richmond, who was Governor General of British North America 1818–1819, Richmond County was created in 1835.

Richmond County comprises that territory known as the Southern District which was established in 1824 at the time of the dividing of Cape Breton Island into three districts. The boundaries of the Southern District were defined at the time of its establishment. Those same boundaries were determined to be the boundaries of Richmond County by statute in 1847.

The main centre is Arichat, located on Isle Madame.

== Communities ==
Villages

- St. Peter's

Reserves

- Chapel Island 5

County municipality and subdivisions

- Municipality of the County of Richmond
  - Richmond Subdivision A
  - Richmond Subdivision B
  - Richmond Subdivision C

== Access routes ==
Highways and numbered routes that run through the county, including external routes that start or finish at the county limits:

- Highways
  - Hwy 104
- Trunk Routes
  - Trunk 4
- Collector Routes:
  - Route 206
  - Route 247
  - Route 320
  - Route 327
- External Routes:
  - None

== Demographics ==
As a census division in the 2021 Census of Population conducted by Statistics Canada, Richmond County had a population of 8,914 living in 4,100 of its 5,230 total private dwellings, a change of −0.6% from its 2016 population of 8,964. With a land area of 1,246.08 km^{2} (481.11 sq mi), it had a population density of 7.2/km^{2} (18.5/sq mi) in 2021.

Forming the majority of the Richmond County census division, the Municipality of the County of Richmond, including its Subdivisions A, B, and C, had a population of 8,509 living in 3,961 of its 5,083 total private dwellings, a change of 0.6% from its 2016 population of 8,458. With a land area of 1,240.46 km^{2} (478.94 sq mi), it had a population density of 6.9/km^{2} (17.8/sq mi) in 2021.

Population trend
Census	Population	Change (%)
2021	8,914	▼0.6%
2016	8,964	▼3.5%
2011	9,293	▼4.6%
2006	9,740	▼4.7%
2001	10,225	▼7.2%
1996	11,022	▼2.1%
1991	11,260	▼5.2%
1986	11,841	▼8.3%
1981	12,824	N/A
1941	10,853	
1931	11,098	
1921	12,464	
1911	13,273	
1901	13,515	
1891	14,399	
1881	15,121	
1871	14,268	N/A

Mother tongue language (2011)
Language	Population	Pct (%)
English only	6,620	72.19%
French only	2,085	22.74%
Non-official languages	285	3.11%
Multiple responses	180	1.96%

Ethnic Origins (2006)
Ethnic Origin	Population	Pct (%)
French	4,895	50.8%
Canadian	3,920	40.7%
Scottish	2,310	24.0%
English	2,060	21.4%
Irish	1,590	16.5%
Acadian	710	7.4%
North American Indian	685	7.1%
German	440	4.6%

== See also ==
- List of municipalities in Nova Scotia
