= Nova Scotia Highway 104 =

Highway in Nova Scotia

Highway 104
- Route Transcanadienne
- Miners Memorial Highway; Trans-Canada Highway
- Highway 104 highlighted in red

Route information
- Maintained by Nova Scotia Department of Public Works
- Length: 319.4 km (198.5 mi)
- Existed: 1964–present

Trans-Canada Highway segment
- Length: 274.1 km (170.3 mi)
- West end: Route 2 (TCH) at the New Brunswick border
- Major intersections: Trunk 2 at Fort Lawrence; Trunk 2 / Trunk 6 at Amherst; Hwy 142 near Springhill; Trunk 4 near Thomson Station; Trunk 4 at Glenholme; Hwy 102 near Truro; Hwy 106 (TCH) near New Glasgow; Trunk 7 at Antigonish; Trunk 4 / Trunk 16 at Monastery; Trunk 4 at Aulds Cove
- East end: Hwy 105 (TCH) / Trunk 4 / Trunk 19 at Port Hastings

Cape Breton segment
- Length: 37.3 km (23.2 mi)
- West end: Trunk 4 near Port Hawkesbury
- East end: Trunk 4 near St. Peter's

Location
- Country: Canada
- Province: Nova Scotia

Highway system
- Trans-Canada Highway; Provincial highways in Nova Scotia; 100-series
← Hwy 103	→ Hwy 105 (TCH)

Highway 104 in Nova Scotia, Canada, runs from Fort Lawrence at the New Brunswick border near Amherst to River Tillard near St. Peter's. Except for the portion on Cape Breton Island between Port Hawkesbury and St. Peter's, it forms the main route of the Trans-Canada Highway (TCH) across the province.

Highway 104 mostly supplants the former route of Trunk 4. In 1970, all sections of Trunk 4 west of New Glasgow were renumbered, although parts of that highway was restored in later years along bypassed sections as new alignments of Highway 104 opened to traffic.

The provincial government named the highway the Miners Memorial Highway on September 8, 2008, one month before the 50th anniversary of the Springhill mining disaster of October 23, 1958.

== Route description ==
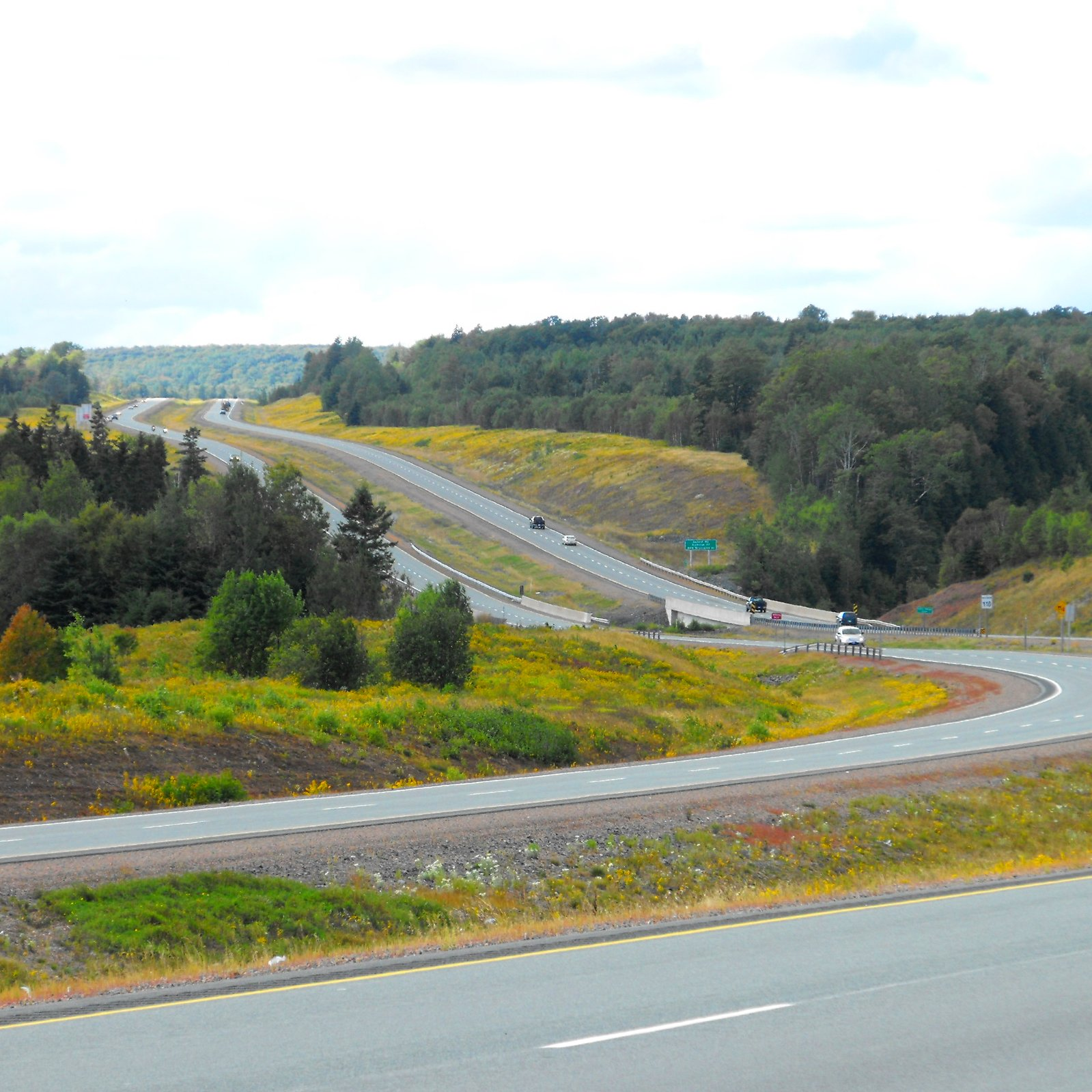
View of the Cobequid Pass toll section of Highway 104 through Colchester County.

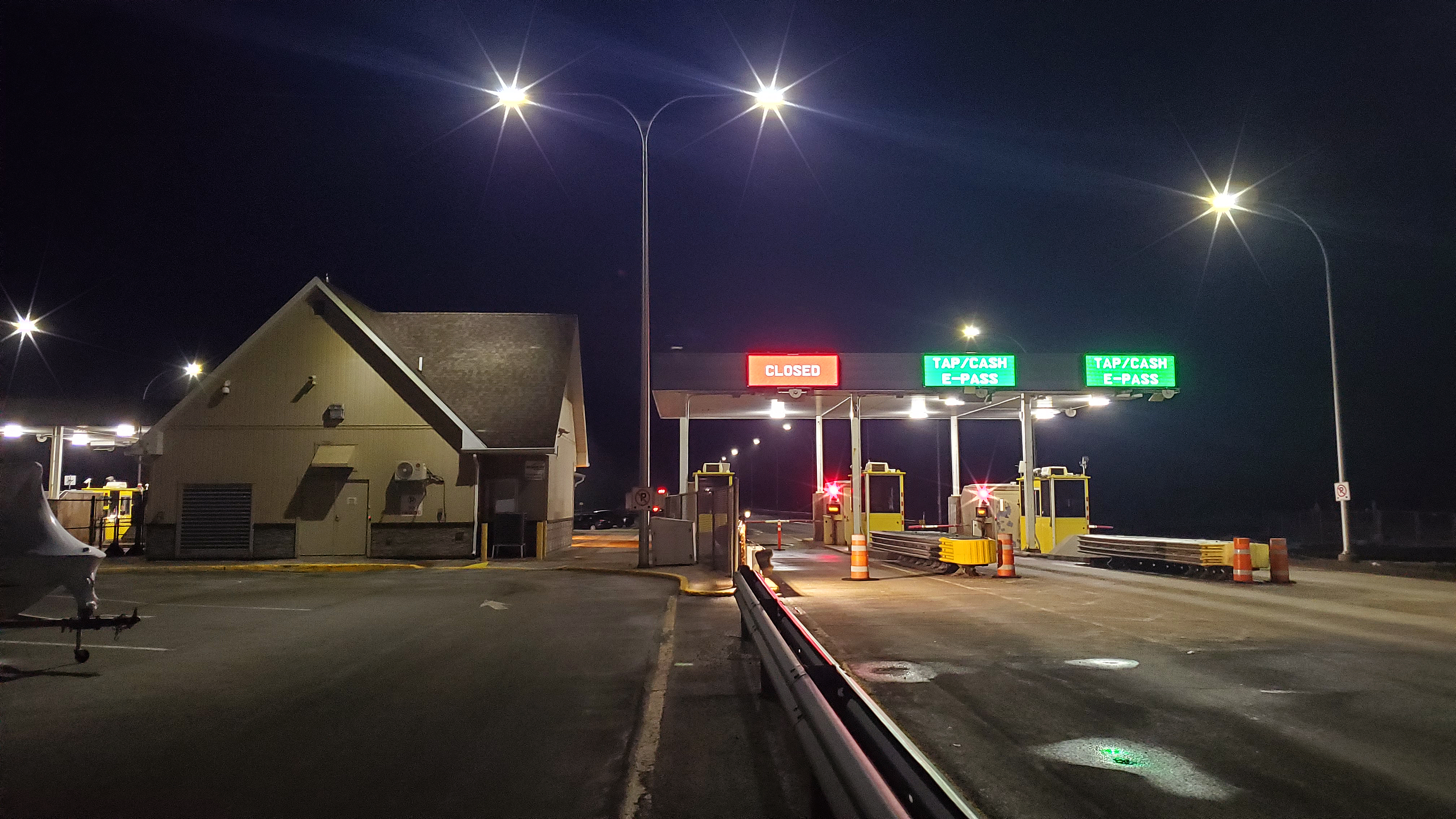
Cobequid Pass toll plaza

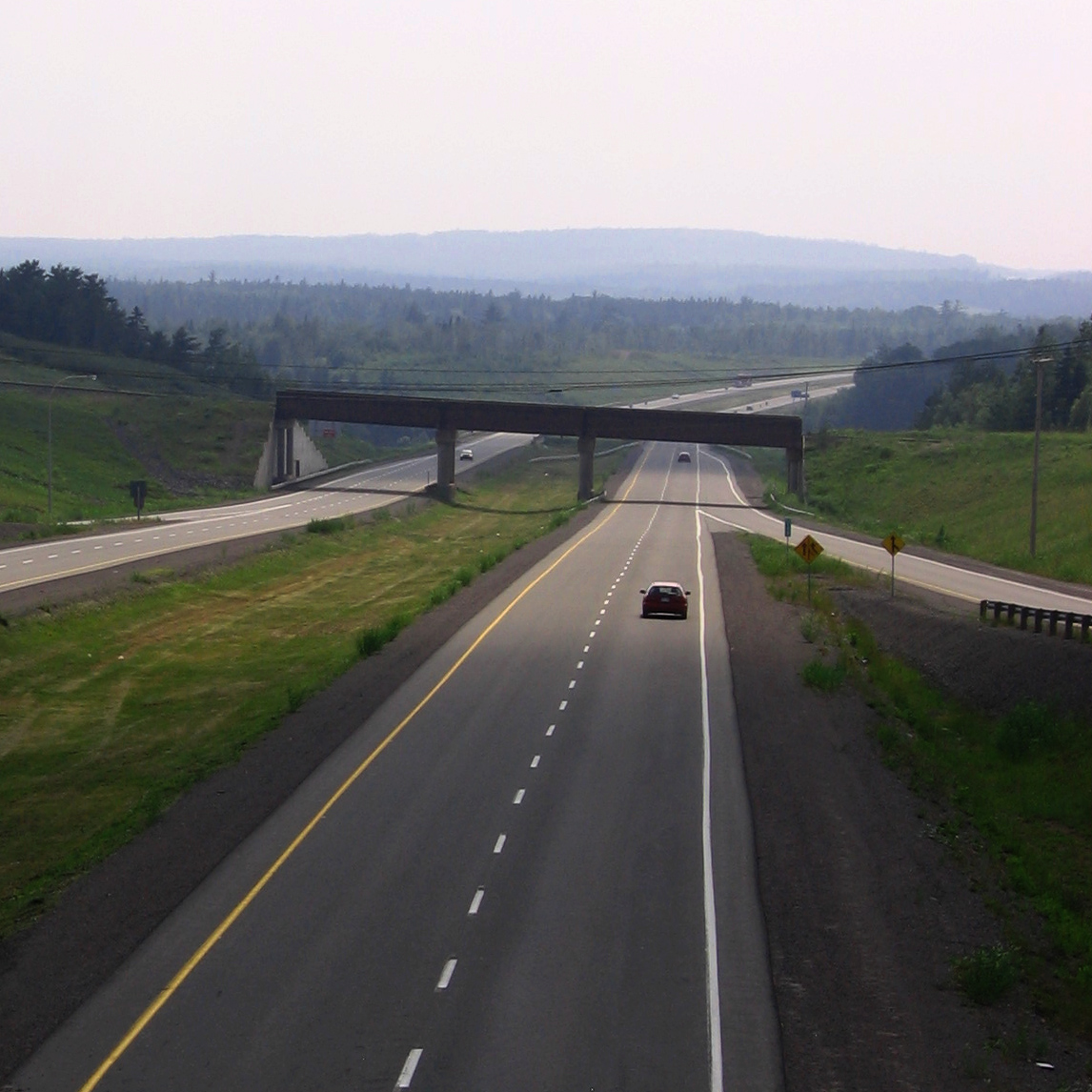
Highway 104 outside Westville (Exit 21).

The highway's present alignment measures 319 kilometres (198 mi) long, of which the western 232 kilometres (144 mi) between the inter-provincial border with New Brunswick at Fort Lawrence to east of Lower South River is a four-lane divided freeway. The eastern 92 kilometres (57 mi) from Lower South River to River Tillard is a mixture of two-lane controlled access highway (known as a Super 2), and uncontrolled access two-lane highway.

Highway 104 is divided into two distinct sections; the Trans-Canada Highway section that runs from the New Brunswick border to Port Hastings, and a smaller section on Cape Breton Island that runs between Port Hawkesbury and St. Peter's.

=== Trans-Canada Highway section ===
From the inter-provincial border at Fort Lawrence to Lower South River east of Antigonish, Highway 104 is a four-lane divided freeway with posted speed limit of 110 kilometres per hour (70 mph). Shortly after the TCH enters the province (continuing from New Brunswick Highway 2) and becoming Highway 104, the freeway reaches Amherst, arcing to the west around the town. Beyond Amherst, the highway enters the Cobequid Mountains, passing the communities of Oxford and Thomson Station.

East of Thomson Station at the highway's first of several interchanges with the parallel Trunk 4 (Exit 7), it reaches the 35 km (22 mi)-long tolled Cobequid Pass section, with the highway's only rest areas and the toll plaza located roughly at the midpoint of the official toll portion (which is actually only tolled between Exits 8 and 10), which ends at Exit 12, another interchange with Trunk 4, in Masstown. From Masstown, the highway runs east and northeast for 14 kilometres (8.7 mi) to the rural community of Onslow, near Truro, and interchanges with Highway 102, a four-lane divided freeway and the main route connecting the TCH with Halifax and southern Nova Scotia.

Highway 104 continues for 55 kilometres (34 mi), past Westville, to Highway 106, a branch of the Trans-Canada Highway that connects to Prince Edward Island via a ferry. The highway then reaches Stellarton and New Glasgow, with the highway passing through Stellarton and New Glasgow being located just to the north. East of the two towns, Highway 104 runs east for 55 kilometres (34 mi) to Antigonish. The freeway ends 8.4 kilometres (5.2 mi) beyond Antigonish and narrows to a two-lane road near Dagger Woods. As of 2026, work is underway to twin the highway east to the Paqtnkek Mi’kmaw Nation.

From the end of the freeway section at Highway 316, the highway runs east for 4 kilometres (2.5 mi) to Pomquet Forks as a Super 2 and remains as a controlled access highway, although there are several at-grade intersections. East of Pomquet Forks, the highway runs east for 3 kilometres (1.9 mi) to Heatherton as an uncontrolled access highway (formerly Trunk 4) and speed limit reduces 90 kilometres per hour (55 mph). Past Heatherton, the highway runs east for 29 kilometres (18 mi) to Auld's Cove and speed limit increased back to 100 kilometres per hour (62 mph). At Auld's Cove, the highway becomes an uncontrolled access highway with a posted speed limit of 70 kilometres per hour (45 mph) and begins a concurrency with Trunk 4. It crosses the Strait of Canso along the 1.4-kilometre (1,400-metre; 0.87-mile) Canso Causeway to Port Hastings on Cape Breton Island. At Port Hastings, the highway intersects Trunk 4, Trunk 19 and Highway 105 at a roundabout where Highway 105 proceeds east carrying the Trans-Canada Highway designation.

=== Cape Breton Island section ===
From the roundabout at Port Hastings, there is an 8-kilometre (5.0 mi) gap in Highway 104, which is connected by Trunk 4, passing the town of Port Hawkesbury. The highway reappears at the Exit 43 interchange for Trunk 4 in Melville, just outside of Port Hawkesbury. A Highway 104 bypass from Port Hastings to Melville has been proposed in the past. Concept designs have shown a new alignment of 4-lane freeway being built around the northwest side of Port Hastings, crossing Highway 105 at a new interchange near an electrical substation. The new alignment of Highway 104 would proceed east and then southeast approximately following a power line corridor to the Exit 43 interchange in Melville.

From Port Hawkesbury, the highway runs east as a controlled-access super-2 for 34 kilometres (21 mi) to its current eastern terminus at an at-grade intersection with Trunk 4 in River Tillard, near St. Peters. An extension of Highway 104 from River Tillard to Sydney River has been proposed in the past. The Nova Scotia provincial government has designated the entire length of Highway 104 from Fort Lawrence to River Tillard as a "strategic highway" to qualify for federal cost-sharing of maintenance and future upgrades. This designation has also been applied to the remaining Trunk 4 corridor in Cape Breton along the south shore of Bras d'Or Lake from St. Peters to Sydney River. It is eventually envisioned that the Trans-Canada Highway will follow the entire length of Highway 104 from Amherst to Sydney River as a 4-lane freeway, upgraded from the existing two-lane freeway and uncontrolled access sections of the highway.

== History ==
Highway 104 was constructed to replace Trunk 4, which originally began at the New Brunswick border in Fort Lawrence. When the Trans-Canada Highway system was established, Trunk 4 was its designated main route across mainland Nova Scotia. When controlled-access sections of Highway 104 were first built in the 1960s, initially as Super 2's, the number and the Trans-Canada routing replaced Trunk 4 entirely west of New Glasgow after 1970, although much of that highway's central segments west of there were restored in subsequent years after new alignments of Highway 104 opened, with later bypassed sections being retained after new freeway construction.

=== Upgrading to freeway ===
The western portion of the highway was upgraded to the present four-lane freeway in stages: The first parts were reconstructed (mostly by twinning) in three separate sections from the New Brunswick border to Thomson Station (KM 0 to 49), from Masstown to Salt Springs (KM 92 to 146), and from Westville Road to Plymouth (KM 159 to 166) and were completed by the early 1990s.

The freeway gap between Thomson Station and Masstown (KM 49 to 92) was closed when the tolled Cobequid Pass section (built on a new alignment) opened on November 15, 1997, with the gap from Salt Springs to Westville Road (KM 146 to 159) being closed when a freeway segment built on a new alignment opened at about the same timeframe.

In the 21st Century, the freeway was extended eastwards when the sections from Plymouth to Pine Tree (KM 166 to 174) and from Pine Tree to Sutherlands River (KM 174 to 177) were twinned and opened in 2011 and 2012 respectively. On September 19, 2012, a separate freeway section was opened from Addington Forks to South River Road (KM 219 to 228) to bypass Antigonish, where there were three signalized intersections along the previous alignment. This section was extended east a short distance to KM 232 near Dagger Woods and opened on October 22, 2016.

The final section to complete the present length of freeway was the gap between Sutherlands River to Addington Forks (KM 177 to 219), which had a staggered opening between May 18 (when a 10 km (6 mi) stretch opened from Barney's River Station to James River) and July 25, 2023, when the adjacent sections opened.

Two freeway rest areas opened near kilometre marker 71 (one for each direction) just west of the Cobequid Pass toll station in 2025. Both feature washrooms and sitting-out areas, and are the only such facilities along the highway.

As of 2026, the aforementioned work to twin the highway east to the Paqtnkek Mi’kmaw Nation is underway.

== Future ==
The province of Nova Scotia has proposed construction of a new 84-kilometre (52 mi) 2 lane arterial from the current end of Highway 104 at St. Peter's to Highway 125 at Sydney. This highway would travel mostly east of the current Trunk 4 and open as a Super 2. It would serve as a bypass of Trunk 4 and likely take designation of the Trans Canada Highway rather than Highway 105. When completed, this would provide nearly continuous controlled access highway across Nova Scotia on the Trans Canada Highway. Construction costs are estimated to be approximately $500 million and tolls have been proposed in the past. This project is currently not on the province's 5-year highway plan.

== Exit list ==
County	Location	km	mi	Exit	Destinations	Notes
Missaguash River		0.0	0.0	—	Route 2 (TCH) west – Moncton	Continuation into New Brunswick
Missaguash River		0.0	0.0	Missaguash River Bridge		
Cumberland	Fort Lawrence	0.7	0.43	1	Trunk 2 east (Laplanche Street) to Trunk 6 – Amherst, Fort Lawrence	Eastbound signed as Exit 1A
Cumberland	Amherst	5.2	3.2	3	Trunk 6 east (Victoria Street, Sunrise Trail) – Amherst, Tatamagouche	
Cumberland	Amherst	8.7	5.4	4	Trunk 2 (South Albion Street) – Amherst, Springhill, Parrsboro	
Cumberland		29.4	18.3	5	Hwy 142 south – Springhill, Parrsboro	
Cumberland	Oxford	39.7	24.7	6	Route 321 to Route 204 – Oxford, Pugwash, River Philip	
Cumberland		48.5	30.1	7	Trunk 4 – Mahoneys Corner, Wentworth, Folly Lake	
Cumberland		59.2	36.8	8	Wentworth-Collingwood Road to Trunk 4 – Westchester Station, Collingwood	West end of Cobequid Pass tolled section
Colchester		71.8	44.6	Rest Areas		
Colchester		72.6	45.1	Cobequid Pass Toll Plaza		
Colchester		83.3	51.8	10	To Trunk 2 / Trunk 4 – Great Village, Bass River, Londonderry	East end of Cobequid Pass tolled section
Colchester		89.0	55.3	11	Trunk 4 to Trunk 2 – Glenholme, Economy, Five Islands, Folly Lake, Wentworth	
Colchester	Masstown	92.4	57.4	12	Trunk 2 / Trunk 4 – Masstown, Glenholme, Lower Debert	
Colchester		97.6	60.6	13	Debert, Lower Onslow	
Colchester	Onslow	106.3	66.1	15	Hwy 102 south – Truro, Halifax, Halifax International Airport	Hwy 102 exit 15
Colchester	Valley	115.6	71.8	17	To Route 311 / Trunk 4 – Bible Hill, Truro, Tatamagouche	Eastbound exit, westbound entrance
Colchester	Valley	116.2	72.2	17	To Route 311 / Trunk 4 – Bible Hill, Truro, Tatamagouche	Westbound exit, eastbound entrance
Colchester		125.5	78.0	18	Stevens Cross Road – Kemptown, Riversdale	
Pictou		132.7	82.5	18A	Trunk 4 – Mount Thom	
Pictou	Salt Springs	146.3	90.9	19	To Trunk 4 / Route 376 – Salt Springs, Central West River, Durham	
Pictou		154.9	96.3	20	To Trunk 4 – Pleasant Valley, Greenhill, Union Centre	
Pictou	Westville	159.2	98.9	21	Trunk 4 to Route 289 / Cowan Street – Alma, Westville	
Pictou		160.8	99.9	22	Hwy 106 (TCH) north – Pictou, P.E.I. Ferry	Hwy 106 exit 1
Pictou	New Glasgow, Stellarton	163.8	101.8	23	Route 289 / Route 4 – New Glasgow, Westville, Trenton	
Pictou	New Glasgow, Stellarton	165.0	102.5	24	Route 374 – New Glasgow, Stellarton, Trenton, Sheet Harbour	
Pictou	New Glasgow, Stellarton	165.7	103.0	Crosses the East River of Pictou		
Pictou	New Glasgow, Stellarton	166.2	103.3	25	Route 348 (East River Road) – New Glasgow, Stellarton, Trenton	
Pictou		169.8	105.5	26	Route 347 to Trunk 4 – Thorburn, Sherbrooke	
Pictou	Sutherlands River	177.2	110.1	27	Trunk 4 / Route 245 north – Merigomish, Pine Tree, Little Harbour	
Pictou	Broadway	189.6	117.8	28	Trunk 4 – Broadway, Kenzieville, French River	Eastbound exit, westbound entrance
Pictou	Barney's River Station	195.9	121.7	29	Trunk 4 – Kenzieville, Barney's River Station	
Antigonish	James River	209.5	130.2	30	Beaver Mountain Road to Trunk 4 – James River, Marshy Hope	
Antigonish	Addington Forks	218.7	135.9	31	Trunk 4 – Addington Forks, James River, Brierly Brook	
Antigonish	Antigonish	221.0	137.3	32	Trunk 7 to Trunk 4 / Route 337 / Route 245 – Antigonish, Eastern Shore, Sherbrooke, Sheet Harbour, Musquodoboit Harbour, Porters Lake, Preston, Dartmouth, Halifax, Bedford	
Antigonish	Antigonish	223.4	138.8	33	To Trunk 4 – Antigonish, Beech Hill	
Antigonish	Lower South River	228.9	142.2	35	To Trunk 4 / Route 316 – Lower South River, Pomquet, Taylors Road	
Antigonish		232.0	144.2	End of divided freeway; twinning currently underway east to Paqtnkek Mi’kmaw Nation		
Antigonish		236.1	146.7	35B	Pomquet Monks Head Road, Pomquet River Road – Pomquet, St. Andrews	At-grade; interchange under construction
Antigonish	Heatherton	238.1	147.9	36	Summerside Road	At-grade; interchange under construction
Antigonish	Heatherton	239.3	148.7	36A	Trunk 4 east – Afton, Tracadie	At-grade; proposed intersection closure
Antigonish	Heatherton	242.5	150.7	36B	Afton Road north to Trunk 4 – Paqtnkek Mi’kmaw Nation, Afton, Tracadie	Bayside Travel Centre located at interchange
Antigonish	Monastery	251.1	156.0	37	Trunk 4 to Trunk 16 south – Monastery, Guysborough, Tracadie	
Antigonish		261.2	162.3	38	To Trunk 4 – Havre Boucher, Frankville	Eastbound exit, westbound entrance
Antigonish		262.5	163.1	38	To Trunk 4 – Havre Boucher, Frankville	Westbound exit, eastbound entrance
Antigonish	Aulds Cove	269.4	167.4	39	Trunk 4 west – Havre Boucher	West end of Trunk 4 overlap; at-grade
Antigonish	Aulds Cove	270.7	168.2	40	Route 344 south – Mulgrave, St. Francis Harbour	At-grade
Strait of Canso		272.0– 273.4	169.0– 169.9	Canso Causeway		
Inverness	Port Hastings	274.1	170.3	41	Hwy 105 (TCH) east – Chéticamp, Baddeck, Sydney; Trunk 4 east to Hwy 104 (Fleur-de-lis Trail) – Port Hawkesbury, St. Peter's, Sydney; Trunk 19 north (Ceilidh Trail) – Inverness, Port Hood, Margaree Forks	Roundabout; Hwy 105 exit 1; Trans-Canada Highway follows Hwy 105 east
7.9-kilometre (4.9 mi) gap in Hwy 104
Inverness	Port Hawkesbury	282.1	175.3	43	Trunk 4 – Cleveland, Lower River Inhabitants, Canso Causeway	Signed as Hwy 104
Richmond	Lower River Inhabitants	291.8	181.3	44	Cleveland, Lower River Inhabitants, Port Malcolm	At-grade
Richmond	Evanston	293.6	182.4	45	Evanston, Whiteside	At-grade
Richmond	Louisdale	304.7	189.3	46	To Route 320 / Route 206 – Louisdale, Arichat, Grande Anse	
Richmond	Cannes	315.2	195.9	47	Sporting Mountain Road – River Bourgeois, Cannes	
Richmond	River Tillard	319.4	198.5	48	Trunk 4 – River Bourgeois, St. Peter's, Sydney	Eastern terminus (at-grade); through traffic follows Trunk 4 east
1.000 mi = 1.609 km; 1.000 km = 0.621 mi: Concurrency terminus; Incomplete access; Tolled; Route transition; Note: Exit numbers in Nova Scotia are sequential.

Trans-Canada Highway
Previous routes NB Route 2 Highway 106	Highway 104	Next route Highway 105
