= Nova Scotia Trunk 4 =

Highway in Nova Scotia

Trunk 4

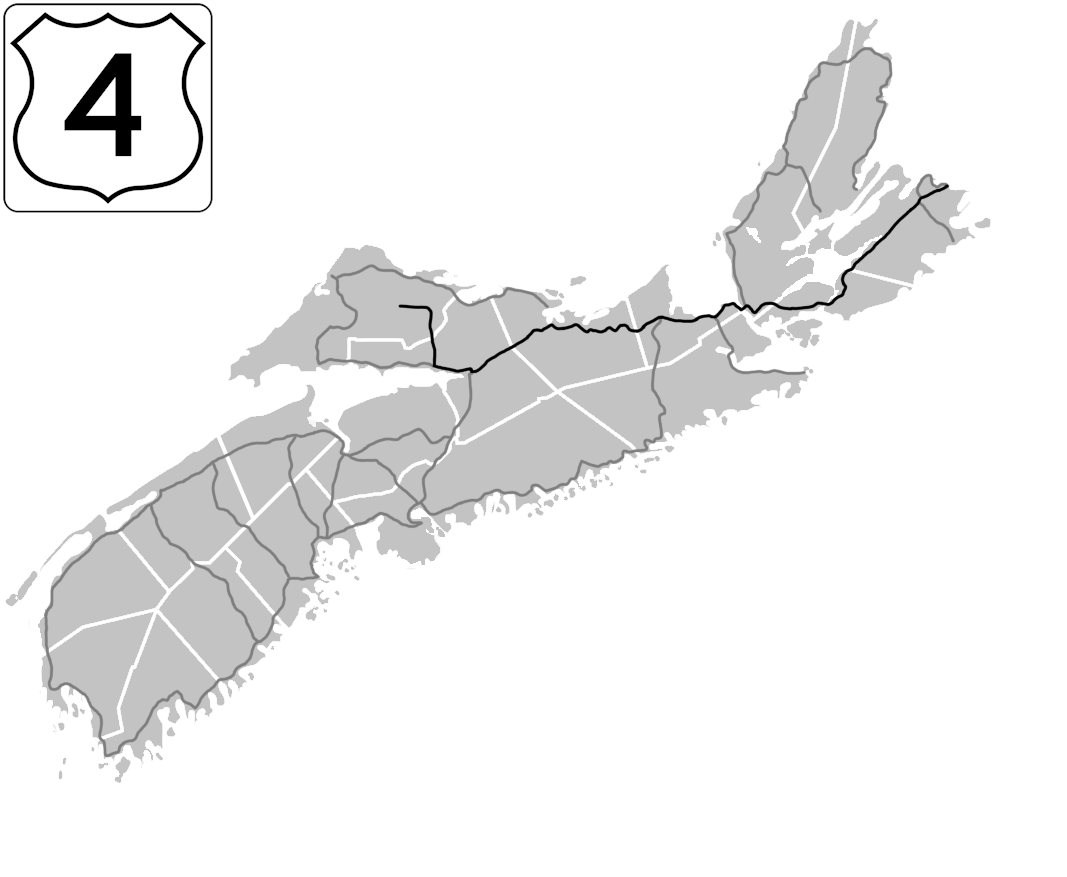

Route information
- Maintained by Department of Transportation and Infrastructure Renewal
- Length: 414.6 km (257.6 mi)

Major junctions
- West end: Hwy 104 (TCH) near Thomson Station
- Hwy 104 (TCH) / Trunk 2 at Glenholme; Hwy 102 / Trunk 2 in Onslow; Trunk 7 in Antigonish; Trunk 16 at Monastery; Hwy 104 (TCH) / Hwy 105 (TCH) / Trunk 19 at Port Hastings; Hwy 104 near St. Peter's; Hwy 125 in Sydney River; Hwy 125 / Trunk 22 / Trunk 28 in Sydney
- East end: Trunk 28 in Glace Bay

Location
- Country: Canada
- Province: Nova Scotia
- Counties: Cumberland, Colchester, Pictou, Antigonish, Inverness, Richmond, Cape Breton
- Major cities: Cape Breton Regional Municipality
- Towns: New Glasgow, Antigonish, Port Hawkesbury

Highway system
- Provincial highways in Nova Scotia; 100-series
← Trunk 3	→ Trunk 6

Trunk 4 is part of the Canadian province of Nova Scotia's system of Trunk Highways. The route runs from Highway 104 exit 7 near Thomson Station to Glace Bay. Until the construction of the Trans-Canada Highway, Trunk 4 was a major traffic link in northern Nova Scotia and Cape Breton, and is still used on Cape Breton as an alternative to Highway 105. The highway was originally called the King's Highway, however, this name is no longer applied to the entire road. The only remaining historic section of the highway that maintains the name "King" is King's Road in Sydney.

== Route description (west to east) ==
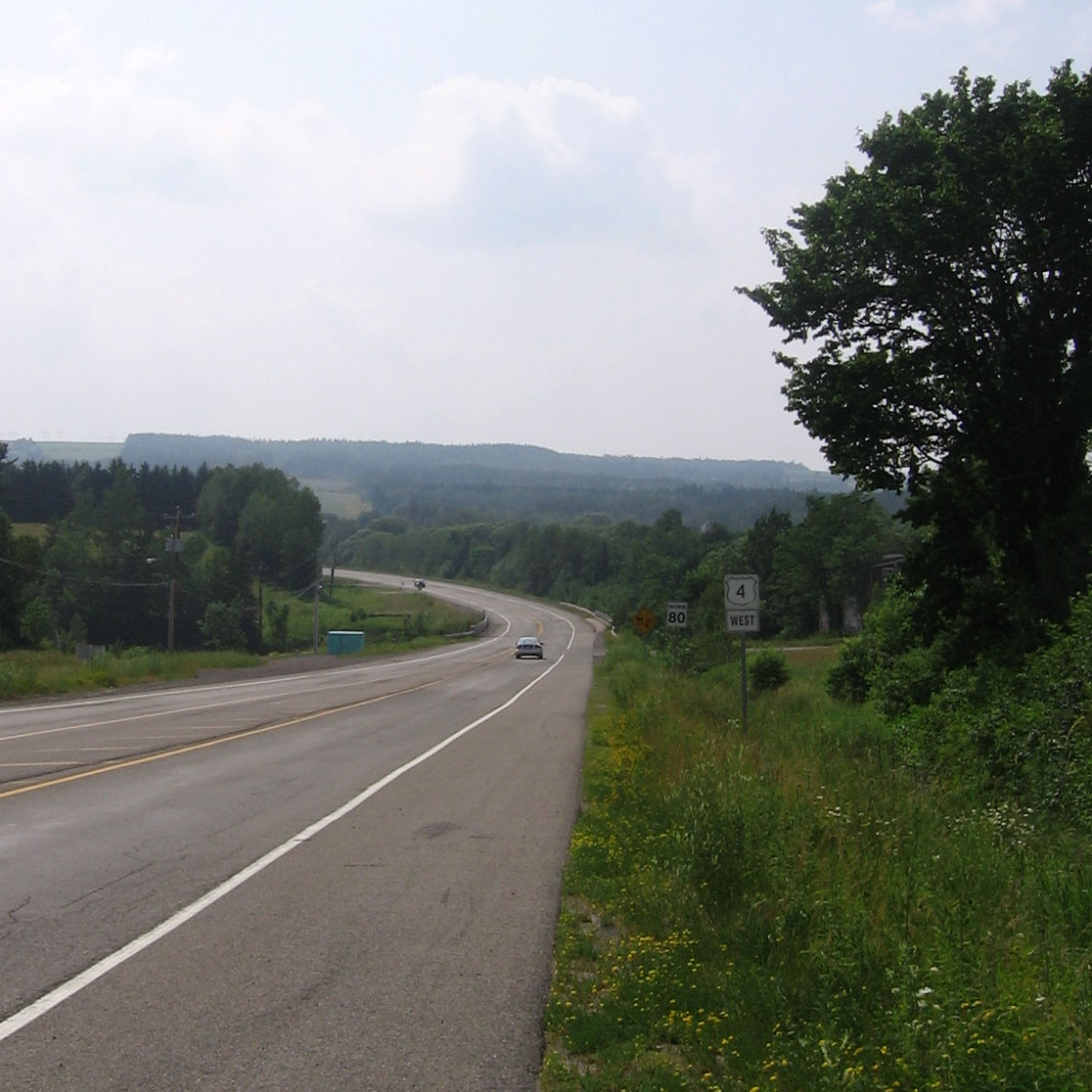
Trunk 4 outside Alma.

Thomson Station to Glenholme

The section between the western terminus at Exit 7, Highway 104 in Thomson Station to Mahoneys Corner was originally built as Highway 104 in the 1960s. It was bypassed by the Cobequid Pass in 1997 and redesignated Trunk 4 at that time. The section between Mahoneys Corner and Glenholme was originally part of Trunk 4 until the 1960s when it was designated Highway 104. This section was also redesignated Trunk 4 in 1997 after the opening of the Cobequid Pass.

Glenholme to Onslow

The section between Glenholme and Onslow is co-designated with Trunk 2. Trunk 4 is discontinuous between Exit 14A, Highway 102 in the west and Pictou Road in Bible Hill in the east.

Bible Hill to Barney's River Station

Trunk 4 reappears in Bible Hill, following Pictou Road and the original Trunk 4 alignment east. In Kemptown, Trunk 4 follows an old alignment of Highway 104 for several kilometres. Trunk 4 continues east of Kemptown on its original alignment through Mount Thom to Salt Springs. From Salt Springs to Westville, the present alignment of Trunk 4 was used as Highway 104 from the 1960s until being bypassed in the 1990s. Now redesignated Trunk 4, the highway designation continues into Westville on Truro Road and then Westville Road. In New Glasgow it follows the original Trunk 4 route on Westville Road, Stellarton Road, George Street, Archimedes Street, Marsh Street and Merigomish Road before heading east toward Sutherlands River. At Sutherlands River, Trunk 4 follows a new alignment between School Rd and Highway 245. It then continues east to Barney's River Station.

Marshy Hope to South River Station

Trunk 4 uses an old Highway 104 alignment between Barney's River Station and Marshy Hope. From Marshy Hope, Trunk 4 proceeds east to Antigonish. In Antigonish, it follows Post Road, James Street, Main Street, and St Andrews Street. East of Antigonish it proceeds to South River Station.

Heatherton to Auld's Cove

Trunk 4 is discontinuous between South River Station and Heatherton as Highway 104 mostly uses the old Trunk 4 alignment. From Heatherton, Trunk 4 proceeds east to Auld's Cove.

Port Hastings to Glace Bay

Trunk 4 is discontinuous between Auld's Cove and Port Hastings as Highway 104 uses the old Trunk 4 alignment. From Port Hastings, Trunk 4 proceeds east through Port Hawkesbury and St. Peter's before turning northeast along the southeastern shore of Bras d'Or Lake through Big Pond and Ben Eoin. It continues east to Sydney River to Sydney. In Sydney it follows Kings Road, Esplanade Road, Welton Street. East of Sydney it continues along Grand Lake Road to Reserve Mines and Glace Bay. In Glace Bay it follows Reserve Street and Union Street and ends at the intersection of Union and Commercial Streets.

== Blue Route ==
Because a large portion of the highway has been paralleled by the faster Highway 104, traffic volumes are comparatively light. As a result, parts of Trunk 4 are currently under review to become part of Nova Scotia's Blue Route, a designated cycling corridor.

== History ==
Trunk 4 originally started at the New Brunswick border in Fort Lawrence. In the early years of the Trans-Canada Highway system, Trunk 4 was the designated Trans-Canada Highway route across mainland Nova Scotia. When controlled-access sections of Highway 104 were first built in the 1960s, the number replaced Trunk 4 entirely west of New Glasgow. As four-lane sections of Highway 104 were built in the late 1990s, the number 4 was again used to mark the former Mount Thom and Wentworth Valley sections of 104.

Original sections of historic Trunk 4 (west to east)

NB-NS border to Monastery

- part of Cumberland Loop in Fort Lawrence serving the Nova Scotia Dept of Tourism visitor information centre is a former Trunk 4 alignment
- Laplanche Street in Fort Lawrence
- Laplanche Street, Church Street, and Albion Street in Amherst
- Trunk 2 from Amherst to Springhill
- Highway 321 from Springhill to Oxford
- Highway 204 from Oxford to Streets Ridge (old road alignment visible at realigned intersection)
- Highway 368 from Streets Ridge to Mahoneys Corner
- current section of Trunk 4 from Mahoneys Corner to Glenholme
- Glenholme Road in Glenholme
- current section of Trunk 4/Trunk 2 from Glenholme to Masstown (old road alignment visible at realigned intersection)
- current section of Trunk 4/Trunk 2 from Masstown to Tidal Bore Road in Onslow
- Tidal Bore Road to Meadow Drive (old bridge - old road alignment visible from Highway 102)
- Robie Street, Juniper Street, Prince Street, and Walker Street in Truro
- Main Street to Pictou Road in Bible Hill
- Pictou Road in Bible Hill and Valley
- current section of Trunk 4 from Valley to Kemptown
- Loop Old Highway 4 in Kemptown
- current section of Trunk 4 from Kemptown to Westville with some minor exceptions
- Truro Road and Westville Road in Westville
- Westville Road, Stellarton Road, George Street, Archimedes Street, Marsh Street and Merigomish Road in New Glasgow
- current section of Trunk 4 from Linacy to Sutherlands River
- School Road in Sutherlands River
- current section of Trunk 4 across Sutherlands River (old bridge - old road alignment visible at realigned intersection)
- current section of Trunk 4 from Sutherlands River to Barneys River Station
- Robertson Road at Barneys River Station
- former section of Highway 104 from Barneys River Station to Marshy Hope (old road alignment visible at some places along this section)
- current section of Trunk 4 from Marshy Hope to Addington Forks
- old road alignment visible at realigned intersection in Addington Forks
- Post Road, James Street, West Street, Main Street, St Andrews Street in Antigonish
- current section of Trunk 4 from Antigonish to South River Road
- current section of Highway 104 from South River Road to Lower South River
- unused old road alignment visible in Taylors Road
- Dagger Woods Road in Dagger Woods
- Heatherton Village Road in Pomquet Forks and Heatherton
- current section of Trunk 4 from Heatherton to Monastery

pre-1955 (Monastery - Port Hawkesbury)

- current section of Trunk 4 from Monastery to Aulds Cove
- current section of Route 344 from Aulds Cove to Mulgrave
  - Prior to the 1930s current section of Old Mulgrave Road from Monastery to Mulgrave
- Wallace Street in Mulgrave
- public car ferry operated by NS Dept of Highways from Mulgrave to Port Hawkesbury; Mulgrave slip located between Wallace Street and Dale Avenue; Port Hawkesbury slip located at foot of MacSween Street
- MacSween Street, Granville Street, and Sydney Road in Port Hawkesbury

post-1955 (Monastery - Port Hawkesbury)

- current section of Trunk 4 from Monastery to Aulds Cove
- current section of Highway 104 in Aulds Cove
- current section of Highway 104 across Canso Causeway
- current section of Trunk 4 from Port Hastings to Port Hawkesbury
- Reeves Street and Sydney Road in Port Hawkesbury

Port Hawkesbury to Glace Bay

- current section of Trunk 4 from Port Hawkesbury to River Tillard
- old road alignment visible at realigned intersection in River Tillard
- current section of Trunk 4 from River Tillard to Sydney River (with exception of new alignment build in Irish Cove in the 1970s)
- Kings Road in Sydney River
- Kings Road, Esplanade Road, Prince Street, Welton Street in Sydney
- current section of Trunk 4 / Grand Lake Road to Reserve Mines
- Sydney Road in Reserve Mines
- Reserve Street in Glace Bay
- Union Street in Glace Bay

== Major intersections ==
County	Location	km	mi	Exit	Destinations	Notes
Cumberland		0.0	0.0		Hwy 104 (TCH) – Amherst, Truro	Western terminus; Hwy 104 exit 7; Hwy 104 is tolled east of exit 7 (Cobequid Pass)
Cumberland	Mahoneys Corner	11.6	7.2		Route 368 north to Route 204 – Westchester Station, Collingwood	
Cumberland	Wentworth Centre	17.9	11.1		Route 307 north to Trunk 6 – Wallace, Pugwash	
Cumberland		22.7	14.1		Route 246 north to Trunk 6 – West New Annan, Tatamagouche	
Colchester	Glenholme	48.1	29.9		Hwy 104 (TCH) – Springhill, Amherst, Masstown, Truro	Hwy 104 exit 10; Hwy 104 is tolled west of exit 10 (Cobequid Pass)
Colchester	Glenholme	49.5	30.8		Trunk 2 north – Great Village, Parrsboro, Amherst	West end of Trunk 2 concurrency
Colchester	Masstown	52.3	32.5		Hwy 104 (TCH) – Oxford, Amherst, Truro, Halifax	Hwy 104 exit 12
Colchester	Onslow	66.9	41.6		Hwy 102 south / Trunk 2 south – Truro, Halifax To Route 311 / Onslow Road	Hwy 102 exit 14A; east end of Trunk 2 concurrency; northbound exit, southbound entrance from Hwy 102
5.6 km (3.5 mi) gap in Trunk 4
Colchester	Bible Hill	72.5	45.0		Route 311 (Main Street) – Truro, Earltown, Tatamagouche	
Colchester	Valley	78.2	48.6		To Hwy 104 (TCH) west / Route 311 / Brookside Road / Salmon River Road – Amherst, Tatamagouche	Hwy 104 exit 17 (eastbound)
Colchester	Valley	78.6	48.8		Hwy 104 (TCH) east – New Glasgow, Cape Breton	Westbound exit, eastbound entrance from Hwy 104; Hwy 104 exit 17 (westbound)
Pictou	Central West River	116.3	72.3		Route 376 to Hwy 106 (TCH) – Durham, Pictou, P.E.I. Ferry	
Pictou	Westville	126.6	78.7		Hwy 104 (TCH) – Truro, Amherst, New Glasgow, Cape Breton	Hwy 104 exit 21
Pictou	Westville	129.7	80.6		Route 289 west – Westville, Union Centre	West end of Route 289 concurrency
Pictou	New Glasgow	131.6	81.8		Hwy 104 (TCH) – Truro, Amherst, Antigonish, Cape Breton	Hwy 104 exit 23
Pictou	New Glasgow	133.4	82.9		Route 374 south (Sellarton Road) – Stellarton	
Pictou	New Glasgow	134.2	83.4	Crosses the East River of Pictou		
Pictou	New Glasgow	134.3	83.5		Route 289 east (George Street to Mountain Road) – Little Harbour; Route 348 north (Provost Street / Archimedes Street) – Trenton	East end of Route 289 concurrency; west end of Route 348 concurrency
Pictou	New Glasgow	134.9	83.8		Route 348 south (East River Road) – Plymouth, Stellarton	East end of Route 348 concurrency
Pictou	New Glasgow	135.5	84.2		Route 347 east (Vale Road) – Thorburn, Sherbrooke	
Pictou	Sutherlands River	146.2	90.8		Hwy 104 (TCH) – New Glasgow, Truro, Antigonish, Cape Breton	Hwy 104 exit 27
Pictou	Sutherlands River	147.9	91.9		Route 245 north – Egerton, Merigomish	
Pictou	Barney's River Station	170.3	105.8		Hwy 104 (TCH) west – New Glasgow	Roundabout interchange; Hwy 104 exit 29
Antigonish		191.7	119.1		Hwy 104 (TCH) / Addington Forks Road – New Glasgow, Cape Breton, Addington Forks	Hwy 104 exit 31
Antigonish	Antigonish	194.5	120.9		Route 245 north to Route 337 – Antigonish; Trunk 7 south to Hwy 104 (TCH) – Sherbrooke, Sheet Harbour, Eastern Shore	
Antigonish	Antigonish	196.6	122.2		Beech Hill Road	
Antigonish		198.7	123.5		Sunrise Trail	Former Trunk 4 alignment
Antigonish	Lower South River	202.5	125.8		Route 316 to Hwy 104 (TCH) – Goshen, Goldboro, St. Andrews, Pomquet Sunrise Trail – Taylors Road	
10.8 km (6.7 mi) gap in Trunk 4
Antigonish	Heatherton	213.2	132.5		Hwy 104 (TCH) – Antigonish, Cape Breton	At-grade; Hwy 104 exit 36A
Antigonish	Monastery	226.6	140.8		Hwy 104 (TCH) – Antigonish, Cape Breton	Hwy 104 exit 37
Antigonish	Monastery	228.0	141.7		Trunk 16 south – Guysborough, Canso	
Antigonish	Auld's Cove	247.2	153.6	39	Hwy 104 (TCH) west – Antigonish	At-grade; west end of Hwy 104 concurrency; exit numbers follow Hwy 104
Antigonish	Auld's Cove	253.5	157.5	40	Route 344 south – Mulgrave, St. Francis Harbour	At-grade
Strait of Canso		254.8– 256.2	158.3– 159.2	Canso Causeway		
Inverness	Port Hastings	274.1	170.3	41	Hwy 105 (TCH) east – Chéticamp, Baddeck, Sydney; Trunk 19 north (Ceilidh Trail) – Inverness, Port Hood, Margaree Forks	Roundabout; exit 1 on Hwy 105; east end of Hwy 104 concurrency; Trans-Canada Highway transitions from Hwy 104 to Hwy 105
Inverness	Port Hawkesbury	282.1	175.3		Hwy 104 east – Isle Madame, St. Peter's, Sydney	Hwy 104 exit 43
Richmond	Grande Anse	291.8	181.3		Route 320 east – Louisdale, D'Escousse, Arichat, Petit-de-Grat	
Richmond	River Tillard	304.7	189.3		Hwy 104 west – Port Hawkesbury, Canso Causeway	At-grade; Hwy 104 eastern terminus; Hwy 104 exit 48
Richmond	St. Peter's	308.1	191.4		West Bay Road (Bras d'Or Lakes Scenic Drive) / Pepperell Street	West end of Bras d'Or Lakes Scenic Drive concurrency
Richmond	St. Peter's	309.7	192.4		Route 247 south – Grande Greve, L'Ardoise, Point Michaud	
Cape Breton	East Bay	376.5	233.9		Route 216 west (Bras d'Or Lakes Scenic Drive) – Eskasoni, Grand Narrows, Iona	East end of Bras d'Or Lakes Scenic Drive concurrency
Cape Breton	Sydney River	389.8	242.2		Hwy 125 – North Sydney, Newfoundland Ferry, Glace Bay, New Waterford, Louisbourg	Hwy 125 exit 6
Cape Breton	Sydney River	390.3	242.5		Route 305 west (Keltic Drive)	
Cape Breton	Sydney	393.2	244.3		Route 327 south (Alexandra Street) – Gabarus	
Cape Breton	Sydney	394.5	245.1		Trunk 22 south (George Street) – Louisbourg	
Cape Breton	Sydney	396.0	246.1		Trunk 28 east – New Waterford	
Cape Breton	Sydney	390.3	242.5		Hwy 125 west to Trunk 22 / Hwy 105 (TCH) / Sydney Port Access Road – North Sydney, Louisbourg, Canso Causeway	At-grade; Hwy 125 exit 9; Hwy 125 eastern terminus
Cape Breton		406.3	252.5		JA Douglas McCurdy Sydney Airport	
Cape Breton	Glace Bay	414.6	257.6		Trunk 28 west (Main Street) / Route 255 south (Commercial Street) – Sydney, Port Morien	Trunk 4 eastern terminus
1.000 mi = 1.609 km; 1.000 km = 0.621 mi: Concurrency terminus; Incomplete access

== See also ==
- List of Nova Scotia provincial highways
