= Area codes 902 and 782 =

Telephone area codes for Nova Scotia and Prince Edward Island

Coordinates: 45.424°N 63.129°W

Area codes 902 and 782 are telephone area codes in the North American Numbering Plan (NANP) for the Canadian provinces of Nova Scotia and Prince Edward Island. Area code 902 was one of the nine original North American area codes in Canada established in October 1947. Area code 782 was added to the numbering plan area in August 2014, to form an overlay complex in mitigation of telephone number shortages.

== History ==
When the American Telephone and Telegraph Company (AT&T) established the first continental telephone numbering plan for Operator Toll Dialing in 1947, the Canadian provinces were organized into nine numbering plan areas (NPAs) with one unique area codes each. Area code 902 was assigned to the area comprising The Maritimes (New Brunswick, Nova Scotia, Prince Edward Island).

In 1949, Newfoundland was added in an expansion of numbering plan area 902. But by 1955, the code was withdrawn from service in New Brunswick and Newfoundland, which received area code 506 in the split, leaving only two of the Maritimes with 902.

Around 2000, when the United States transitioned to telephone number pooling, the Canadian administrators of NANP numbering resources did not participate, and kept allocating blocks of ten thousand numbers, an entire central office prefix, to competitive local exchange carriers in every rate centre where the carrier offers new service. While only 1.06 million people reside in numbering plan area 902, which provides 7.8 million possible seven-digit telephone numbers, the area code was projected to be exhausted by 2015.

In October 2012, the Canadian Radio-television and Telecommunications Commission (CRTC) directed that numbering relief for Nova Scotia and Prince Edward Island be implemented as an area code overlay of 902 with area code 782. Ten-digit dialing became mandatory in Nova Scotia and Prince Edward Island as of November 30, 2014. The decision to implement a bi-provincial overlay may have been unusual, but was made to spare residents in rural areas of Nova Scotia and Prince Edward Island the burden of having to change numbers. As a result, area code 782 was introduced on August 23, 2014. Central office codes for 782 were made available to telephone service providers on May 30, 2014, which could not be activated until November 30, 2014, the official in-service date.

In November 2022, area code 851 was reserved for future assignment as a third area code for the region. A relief planning committee was initiated in June 2025, as the exhaust date is June 2028.

The incumbent local exchange carrier in the numbering plan area is Bell Aliant, which was produced from a merger that included Island Telecom Inc. (formerly Island Telephone, but both were informally shortened to Island Tel), Maritime Telephone and Telegraph (MT&T), New Brunswick Tel (NBTel) and NewTel Communications (NewTel).

== Service area ==
The numbering plan area spans two entire provinces, much like area code 867 is shared by the three Canadian territories: Northwest Territories, Nunavut, and Yukon. This practice is today unique to Canada, but it was once practiced also for the Caribbean island states.

=== Nova Scotia ===
- Amherst (782) – 206 568 585 773 883 885 886 887 889 (902) – 297 397 516 602 612 614 617 660 661 664 667 669 694 699 906 970 991
- Annapolis Royal (782) – 349 (902) – 286 526 532 907 955
- Antigonish (902) – 318 338 604 735 863 867 870 872 908 948 968 971 995
- Argyle (902) – 570 643
- Arichat (902) – 226
- Aylesford (782) – 350 (902) – 321 341 389 847
- Baddeck (782) – 235 (902) – 294 295 296 933
- Bass River (782) – 423 913 994 (902) – 647
- Bear River (902) – 376 467 638
- Barrington (782) – 351 (902) – 320 575 581 619 630 635 637 768 903 972
- Bedford – see Bedford in Halifax Regional Municipality
- Berwick (902) – 375 534 538
- Blandford (902) – 228
- Bridgetown (902) – 312 588 665
- Bridgewater (782) – 207 569 584 (902) – 212 298 355 514 518 521 523 527 529 530 541 543 553 605 904 930 936 990
- Brookfield (902) – 650 673
- Brooklyn (782) – 341 (902) – 253 757
- Caledonia (902) – 390 682 909
- Canning (902) – 582
- Canso (902) – 366 710
- Carleton (902) – 761
- Chelsea (902) – 685
- Chester (902) – 204 275 273 279 299 912 937 973 980
- Cheticamp (782) – 236 (902) – 224 264 335 913
- Cheverie (902) – 633
- Clark's Harbour (902) – 745
- Clarksville (902) – 632
- Collingwood (782) – 254 366 923 (902) – 230 686
- Country Harbour (902) – 328 573
- Dartmouth – see Dartmouth in Halifax Regional Municipality
- Debert (782) – 342 (902) – 641 662
- Digby (782) – 347 820 (902) – 224 245 247 249 250 308 340 378 974
- Dingwall (902) – 383
- East Bay (902) – 255 822 828
- Ecum Secum – see Ecum Secum in Halifax Regional Municipality
- Economy – see Bass River
- Elmsdale – see Elmsdale in Halifax Regional Municipality
- Enfield – see Elmsdale in Halifax Regional Municipality
- Eskasoni (782) – 450 (902) – 379
- Glace Bay (902) – 842 849
- Goldboro (902) – 387
- Goshen (902) – 783
- Grand Narrows (902) – 622 636 716
- Great Village (902) – 655 668
- Greenwood – see Kingston
- Guysborough (902) – 533
- The Halifax Regional Municipality contains multiple telephone rate centers:
  - Bedford (902) – 832 835
  - Dartmouth See Halifax
  - Ecum Secum (902) – 347
  - Elmsdale (902) – 259 883
  - Halifax city centre (782) – 200 234 238 321 358 382 388 409 412 413 414 415 444 446 482 502 530 531 532 533 534 535 536 537 538 539 540 572 588 638 639 640 641 666 688 774 775 788 827 830 845 847 848 849 880 881 882 888 (902) – 209 210 219 220 221 222 223 225 229 233 237 240 244 266 268 292 293 329 332 333 334 344 359 377 399 401 402 403 404 405 406 407 410 412 414 415 417 418 420 421 422 423 424 425 426 427 428 429 430 431 433 434 435 440 441 442 443 444 445 446 448 449 450 451 452 453 454 455 456 457 458 459 460 461 462 463 464 465 466 468 469 470 471 473 474 475 476 477 478 479 480 481 482 483 484 486 487 488 489 490 491 492 493 494 495 496 497 498 499 501 502 503 506 520 536 551 558 559 571 579 580 593 666 700 701 702 703 704 705 706 707 708 717 718 719 720 721 722 789 797 800 801 802 809 817 818 830 876 877 880 932 943 949 981 982 989 997 998 999
  - Hubbards (902) – 857 858
  - Ketch Harbour (782) — 590 (902) – 346 868
  - Lake Echo (902) – 829
  - Middle Musquodoboit (902) – 384
  - Musquodoboit Harbour (782) – 344 824 (902) – 337 342 878 889 891 983
  - Porter's Lake (902) – 281 827
  - Prospect Road (902) – 850 852
  - Sackville (902) – 252 864 865 869
  - Sheet Harbour (902) – 391 591 696 885
  - St. Margarets Bay (902) – 820 821 826
  - Tangier (782) – 481 523 984 (902) – 772
  - Upper Musquodoboit (902) – 325 568 715
  - Waverley (902) – 860 861 873
- Hantsport (902) – 352 684
- Heatherton (902) – 386
- Head of St. Margarets Bay – see St. Margarets Bay in Halifax Regional Municipality
- Hopewell (902) – 272 923
- Hubbards – see Hubbards in Halifax Regional Municipality
- Inverness (902) – 258 280 323 615
- Iona (902) – 725
- Judique see Port Hood
- Kentville (902) – 300 326 365 385 599 670 678 679 680 681 690 691 692 698 713 938 993
- Kenzieville (782) – 459 (902) – 924
- Ketch Harbour see Ketch Harbour in Halifax Regional Municipality
- Kingston (782)- 352, (902) – 242 760 765 804 996
- LaHave (902) – 688
- Lake Echo – see Lake Echo in Halifax Regional Municipality
- Lawrencetown (902) – 584
- L'Ardoise (902) – 587 793
- Liscomb (902) – 779
- Liverpool (782) – 339 821 (902) – 343 350 354 356 642 646 803 975
- Lockeport (902) – 656
- Louisbourg (902) – 596 733
- Louisdale (902) – 345 796
- Lunenburg (902) – 634 640
- Mabou (902) – 945
- Maccan (902) – 274 545
- Maitland (902) – 261
- Marion Bridge (902) – 727 946
- Mahone Bay (902) – 531 624 627
- Margaree Forks (902) – 248
- Margaree Harbour (902) – 235
- Melrose (902) – 833
- Merigomish (782) – 422 (902) – 926
- Meteghan (902) – 645
- Middleton (782) – 348 822 (902) – 309 322 349 363 824 825 840
- Middle Musquodoboit – see Middle Musquodoboit in Halifax Regional Municipality
- Mill Village (902) – 677 935
- Monastery (902) – 232 234
- Mount Uniacke (902) – 256 866
- Mulgrave (902) – 287 747
- Musquodoboit Harbour – see Musquodoboit Harbour in Halifax Regional Municipality
- New Germany (902) – 398 644
- New Glasgow (782) – 233 420 440 608 978 (902) – 301 331 419 507 513 600 601 616 695 752 753 754 755 759 771 921 928 931 934 952 967
- New Ross (902) – 689
- New Waterford (902) – 592 862
- North Sydney (902) – 794
- Oxford (902) – 447 552
- Parrsboro (782) – 343 (902) – 216 254 590 613 728 744
- Pictou (902) – 382 485
- Port Bickerton (902) – 364
- Porter's Lake – see Porters Lake in Halifax Regional Municipality
- Port Hawkesbury (782) – 825 (902) – 227 302 623 625 631 738 777 939 951 984
- Port Hood (902) – 787
- Port Maitland (902) – 649
- Port Morien (902) – 554 737
- Prospect Road – see Prospect in Halifax Regional Municipality
- Pubnico (902) – 762 927
- Pugwash (782) – 287 460 514 (902) – 243
- Queensport (902) – 358
- River Hebert (902) – 251 732
- River John (782) – 439 (902) – 351
- Riverport (902) – 764 766
- Sackville – see Sackville in Halifax Regional Municipality
- Sandy Cove (902) – 834
- St. Anns (902) – 929
- Saulnierville (782) – 353 (902) – 205 260 540 769 770 773 778
- Stellarton – see New Glasgow
- Stewiacke (902) – 639
- Salt Springs (902) – 925
- Shubenacadie (902) – 203 236 750 751 758 767 987
- Shelburne (782) – 354, (902) – 207 265 319 512 709 874 875 879 985
- Sherbrooke (902) – 522
- Sheet Harbour – see Sheet Harbour in Halifax Regional Municipality
- Springfield (902) – 547
- Springhill (902) – 597 763
- St. Margarets Bay – see St. Margarets Bay in Halifax Regional Municipality
- St. Peters (902) – 535 785
- Sydney (782) – 777 (902) – 202 217 270 284 304 317 322 371 408 416 500 509 536 537 539 549 560 561 562 563 564 565 567 574 577 578 590 595 780 919 979
- Sydney Mines (902) – 241 544 736
- Tangier – see Tangier in Halifax Regional Municipality
- Tatamagouche (782) – 425 (902) – 657
- Thorburn (902) – 246 922
- Trenton (902) – see New Glasgow
- Truro (902) – 305 324 505 603 606 814 843 890 893 895 896 897 898 899 920 953 956 957 977 986
- Tusket (902) – 648 941
- Wallace (902) – 257
- Walton (902) – 528
- Waverley – see Waverley in Halifax Regional Municipality
- Wedgeport (902) – 663 965
- Wentworth (902) – 548
- Westville (902) – 396
- Weymouth (782) – 346 826 (902) – 515 837 841
- Whycocomagh (902) – 756
- Windsor (902) – 306 321 472 589 788 790 791 792 798 799 901 994
- Wolfville (902) – 320 542 585 697
- Woods Harbour (902) – 373 723
- Upper Musquodoboit – see Upper Musquodoboit in Halifax Regional Municipality
- Yarmouth (782) – 345, (902) – 307 395 400 413 504 508 740 742 746 748 749 774 815 881 966 988

=== Prince Edward Island ===
- Alberton (782) – 212 318 (902) – 206 214 231 853 856 960
- Bedeque (902) – 887
- Borden-Carleton (782) – 319 (902) – 437 729 855
- Cardigan (902) – see Three Rivers
- Charlottetown (782) – 317 355 377 550 553 556 557 772 843 844 846 979 (902) – 200 201 213 218 239 288 314 316 330 355 367 368 370 388 393 394 409 519 556 557 566 569 607 620 626 628 629 781 812 892 894 916 940 948 978
- Cornwall (902) – see Charlottetown
- Covehead (782) – 320 (902) – 672
- Crapaud (902) – 658 730
- Eldon (782) – 483 (902) – 659
- Georgetown (902) – see Three Rivers
- Hunter River (782) – 244 323 (902) – 621 734 964
- Kensington (782) – 325 (902) – 836
- Montague (902) – see Three Rivers
- Morell-St. Peters (902) – 961
- Mount Stewart (902) – 676
- Murray River (782) – 327 (902) – 741 962
- New Haven (782) – 328 486 (902) – 675
- New London (782) – 462 (902) – 886
- O'Leary (782) – 329 (902) – 726 807 859
- Resort Municipality (902) – see Rusticoville
- Rusticoville (782) – 330 (902) – 963
- Souris (782) – 331 (902) – 208 215 327 687 743
- Stratford (902) – see Charlottetown
- Summerside (782) – 202 241 324 332 541 542 543 544 (902) – 303 315 358 374 381 432 436 438 439 598 724 888 918 954 992
- Three Rivers, Prince Edward Island contains multiple telephone rate centers:
  - Cardigan (902) – 583
  - Georgetown (902) – 652 808
  - Montague (782) – 326 360 823 829 (902) – 313 326 361 784 838 846 969
- Tignish (782) – 334 (902) – 775 806 882
- Tyne Valley (782) – 494 (902) – 831

=== Premium services ===
Premium services for NPA 902 are provided with central office code 976.

== See also ==
- Canadian Numbering Administration Consortium
- Telephone numbers in Canada

Nova Scotia and Prince Edward Island area codes: 782/902
	North: Gulf of Saint Lawrence, 418/581, 709	
West: 506	902/782	East: Atlantic Ocean
	South: Atlantic Ocean	
New Brunswick area codes: 506/428
Newfoundland and Labrador area codes: 709/879
Quebec area codes: 367/418/581, 354/450/579, 263/438/514, 468/819/873
