= List of shipwrecks in January 1848 =

The list of shipwrecks in January 1848 includes ships sunk, foundered, grounded, or otherwise lost during January 1848.

== 1 January ==
List of shipwrecks: 1 January 1848
Ship	State	Description
Bretonne	France	The ship was wrecked on Alicudi, Lipari Islands. Her crew were rescued.
Ceres	United Kingdom	The ship ran aground and sank on the Knoll Sand, in the North Sea off Saltfleet, Lincolnshire. Her crew were rescued. She was on a voyage from Cardiff, Glamorgan to Hull, Yorkshire.
Heart of Oak	United Kingdom	The ship was in collision with Queen (United Kingdom) and sank in the North Sea off Bridlington, Yorkshire. Her crew were rescued. She was on a voyage from Kronstadt, Russia to King's Lynn, Norfolk.
Republican	United Kingdom	The ship was in collision with a brig and foundered in the North Sea off Seaham, County Durham. Her crew were rescued. She was on a voyage from Wisbech, Cambridgeshire to Newcastle upon Tyne, Northumberland.
Rock	United Kingdom	The ship was abandoned in the Bay of Luce. She was on a voyage from Belfast, County Antrim to Fort William, Inverness-shire. She was refloated on 5 January and resumed her voyage.
Rosamond	United Kingdom	The smack was driven ashore in the Bay of Luce. She was on a voyage from Dublin to Belfast.
Union	United Kingdom	The sloop was in collision with a schooner and was abandoned in the North Sea off Dimlington, Yorkshire, Her crew were rescued by Mersey (United Kingdom). Union subsequently sank south of Bridlington. She was on a voyage from South Shields, County Durham to London.

== 2 January ==
List of shipwrecks: 2 January 1848
Ship	State	Description
Caroline	United Kingdom	The schooner was driven ashore on Bird Island, Bermuda. She was on a voyage from Boston, Massachusetts, United States to Liverpool, Lancashire.
Fortuna	(Russian Empire) Grand Duchy of Finland	The ship was wrecked on Whalsay, Shetland Islands, United Kingdom with the loss of eight of her eighteen crew. She was on a voyage from Turku to Gibraltar.
General Wood	United Kingdom	The convict ship was taken by the convicts on board and was deliberately wrecked off Hong Kong. Her captain and several crew were reported missing. She was on a voyage from Hong Kong to Penang, Straits Settlements.
Heyestadt	Norway	The ship was lost near Vigten with the loss of a crew member. She was on a voyage from Arkhangelsk, Russia to Amsterdam, North Holland.
Heinrich	Flag unknown	The ship was wrecked on the east coast of Gotland. Her crew were rescued.
Margaret	United Kingdom	The ship was wrecked on the Longsand, in the North Sea off the coast of Essex . Her crew were rescued by HMRC Desmond ( Board of Customs). Margaret was on a voyage from Danzig to Weymouth, Dorset.
Maria	Spain	The ship ran aground on the English Bank, off the coast of Uruguay and was abandoned by her crew. She was on a voyage from Cádiz to Montevideo, Uruguay.
Ovid	United Kingdom	The ship was wrecked on a sandbank in the Baie de Somme. She was on a voyage from Saint-Valery-sur-Somme, Somme, France to Sunderland, County Durham.
Sovereign	United Kingdom	The ship ran aground and sank at Fraserburgh, Aberdeenshire.

== 3 January ==
List of shipwrecks: 3 January 1848
Ship	State	Description
Alida Gesina	Flag unknown	The ship was driven ashore by ice at Hooksiel, Kingdom of Hanover.
Aurora	Bremen	The ship was driven ashore by ice at Hooksiel. She was on a voyage from Bremen to Amsterdam, North Holland, Netherlands.
A. Z.	United Kingdom	The ship ran aground in the Mississippi River.
Belle	United Kingdom	The schooner was driven ashore at Punta Mala, Spain. She was on a voyage from Galaţi, Ottoman Empire to an English port. She was refloated and taken in to Gibraltar.
Eliza	United Kingdom	The ship ran aground and sank in the Rio Grande. She was on a voyage from Cádiz, Spain to the Rio Grande.
Maria Margaretha	Flag unknown	The ship was driven ashore by ice at Hooksiel.
Maria Sophia	United States	The ship ran aground on Execution Rock, in Long Island Sound. She was refloated and taken in to New York.
Nornen	Norway	The ship was driven ashore at "Silden". She was on a voyage from Bergen to a Mediterranean port. She was refloated and taken in to Silden.
Oby	United Kingdom	The sloop was driven ashore near Theddlethorpe, Lincolnshire. She was on a voyage from Gravesend, Kent to Newcastle upon Tyne, Northumberland.
Pilgrim	United Kingdom	The schooner was driven ashore at Bagan Bar, County Wexford.
Rebecca	United Kingdom	The ship was driven ashore by ice at Hooksiel.
Unanimity	United Kingdom	The ship was driven ashore at Great Yarmouth, Norfolk. She was on a voyage from Sunderland, County Durham to Southampton, Hampshire. She was refloated the next day and taken in to Great Yarmouth.
Victoria	(United Kingdom of Great Britain and Ireland) British North America	The schooner was driven ashore at Harbour Bouche, Nova Scotia. She was on a voyage from Pictou to Halifax.
William	United Kingdom	The schooner was driven ashore and wrecked at Finnyfauld, Aberdeenshire with the loss of two of her three crew. She was on a voyage from Hull, Yorkshire to Port Dundas, Renfrewshire.

== 4 January ==
List of shipwrecks: 4 January 1848
Ship	State	Description
Albion	United Kingdom	The ship was wrecked 3 leagues (7.8 nmi; 14 km) north of Cape Mondego, Portugal with the loss of all hands. She was on a voyage from London to Trieste.
Bellona	United Kingdom	The ship was holed by an anchor and sank at North Shields, County Durham. She was refloated and beached on 11 January.
Christian	United Kingdom	The ship was driven ashore derelict at Porth Gwylan, Caernarfonshire. She was on a voyage from Demerara, British Guiana to Liverpool, Lancashire. She became a wreck the next day.
Maria Helena	Chile	The whaler struck a reef at night off Christmas Island en route from Honolulu Sandwich Islands to Tahiti. The passengers and crew were marooned on the island until rescued in March after they sent a boat on the 22-day journey to Honolulu to relay their circumstances. The rescue vessel was Sarcelle (French Navy), which landed those rescued at Honolulu on 11 April.
Martha Brae	(United Kingdom of Great Britain and Ireland) British North America	The ship was wrecked on East Deer Island, Fundy Islands, New Brunswick. She was on a voyage from Saint John, New Brunswick to Saint Kitts.
Rob the Ranter	United Kingdom	The sloop was wrecked near Elie, Fife. Her crew were rescued. She was on a voyage from East Wemyss to Anstruther.

== 5 January ==
List of shipwrecks: 5 January 1848
Ship	State	Description
China	United Kingdom	The ship ran aground between Dover and South Foreland, Kent. She was on a voyage from London to Charleston, South Carolina, United States. China was refloated on 9 January and towed in to Dover.
Clutha	United Kingdom	The ship caught fire at Liverpool, Lancashire and was scuttled. She was on a voyage from Charleston, South Carolina, United States to Liverpool.
James and Mary	United Kingdom	The sailing barge foundered in the North Sea off the coast of Suffolk with the loss of all hands. She was on a voyage from Maidstone, Kent to Lowestoft, Suffolk.

== 6 January ==
List of shipwrecks: 6 January 1848
Ship	State	Description
Heinrich	Flag unknown	The ship was wrecked on the east coast of Gotland, Sweden.
James	United Kingdom	The brig ran aground on the East Barrow Sand, in the North Sea off the coast of Essex. She was on a voyage from Newcastle upon Tyne, Northumberland to Galway. She was refloated the next day with the assistance of eight smacks and taken in to Wivenhoe, Essex in a leaky condition.
Lascar	United Kingdom	The ship was driven ashore on Cape Breton Island, Nova Scotia. British North America. She was on a voyage from Pictou, Nova Scotia to Liverpool, Lancashire. She was refloated on 10 January and taken in to Ship Harbour, Nova Scotia for repairs.
Planter	United Kingdom	The barque was in collision with Goddess (United Kingdom) in the Mediterranean Sea off Algiers, Algeria and put in to "Stora", Beylik of Tunis, where she was condemned. She was on a voyage from Alexandria, Egypt to Cork.
Schwerdorft	Flag unknown	The ship was run aground on the Lemon Sand, in the North Sea. She was on a voyage from South Shields, County Durham, United Kingdom to Dunkirk, Nord, France. She was refloated and taken in to Scarborough, Yorkshire, United Kingdom.
Sirene	United Kingdom	The ship was wrecked near Wierum, Friesland, Netherlands. She was on a voyage from Liverpool, Lancashire to Hamburg.

== 7 January ==
List of shipwrecks: 7 January 1848
Ship	State	Description
Alice	United Kingdom	The ship sprang a leak and put in to Whitehaven, Cumberland, where she sank. She was on a voyage from Dublin to Fleetwood, Lancashire.
Cambria	United Kingdom	The ship was driven ashore crewless in Dunmannen's Bay. She was refloated on 10 January and taken in to Skibbereen, County Cork.
Cornubia	(United Kingdom of Great Britain and Ireland) South Australia	The ship ran aground in the Yarra River. She was on a voyage from Port Phillip to Sydney, New South Wales. She was refloated and resumed her voyage.
Echo	Netherlands	The ship was driven ashore on Texel, North Holland. She was on a voyage from Anjouan, Comoros Islands to Amsterdam, North Holland.
Edward	United Kingdom	The schooner was wrecked at Tynemouth, Northumberland. Her crew were rescued. She was on a voyage from Grangemouth, Stirlingshire to Maldon, Essex.
Gazelle	United Kingdom	The schooner was abandoned 10 leagues (26 nmi; 48 km) off Cartagena, Spain. Her crew were rescued by the barque Tourville (France). Gazelle was on a voyage from Sicily to Glasgow.
Lady of the Lake	United Kingdom	The sloop was driven ashore and wrecked at Seaton Point, Cumberland. She was on a voyage from Ardglass, County Down to Workington, Cumberland.'

== 8 January ==
List of shipwrecks: 8 January 1848
Ship	State	Description
George and Frances	United Kingdom	The schooner was wrecked on the West Hoyle Bank, in Liverpool Bay. Her crew were rescued. She was on a voyage from the Clyde to Runcorn, Cheshire. She was refloated in late January and taken in to Hoylake, Lancashire.
John and Ellen	United Kingdom	The ship ran aground on the South Bank, in the Irish Sea. She was refloated and taken in to Caernarvon in a sinking condition, arriving on 11 January.
Lord Seaton	United Kingdom	The ship was driven ashore and damaged at Kirkcaldy, Fife. She was on a voyage from Quebec City, Province of Canada, British North America to Kirkcaldy. She was refloated on 18 January and taken in to Kirkcaldy. She was then towed to Burntisland, Fife for repairs.
Neptune	Prussia	The ship was wrecked on Fetlar, Shetland Islands, United Kingdom with the loss of all hands.
Ocean Bride	United Kingdom	The ship ran aground on the Middle Sand, in the North Sea off the coast of Essex. She was refloated but consequently sank. Her crew were rescued by HMRC Desmond ( Board of Customs). Ocean Bride was on a voyage from Newcastle upon Tyne to London.
Pacquebot du Havre et Bordeaux	France	The brig was driven ashore at Aberdeen, United Kingdom. Her eleven crew were rescued by the Aberdeen Lifeboat. She was on a voyage from Newcastle upon Tyne, Northumberland, United Kingdom to Bordeaux, Gironde. She subsequently became a wreck.
Providence	United Kingdom	The sailing barge ran aground on the Nore.
Resolution	United Kingdom	The ship was driven ashore and severely damaged at Limerick. She was on a voyage from Liverpool, Lancashire to Limerick.
Sisters	United Kingdom	The ship ran aground on the Haisborough Sands, in the North Sea off the coast on Norfolk. She was on a voyage from Middlesbrough, Yorkshire to Ramsgate, Kent. She was refloated and taken in to Great Yarmouth, Norfolk in a leaky condition.

== 9 January ==
List of shipwrecks: 9 January 1848
Ship	State	Description
Adela	United Kingdom	The ship was driven ashore at the mouth of the River Tay. She was on a voyage from Arkhangelsk, Russia to Dundee, Forfarshire. She was refloated on 22 January.
Amus	United Kingdom	The ship was driven ashore at Landguard Point, Suffolk. She was on a voyage from Newcastle upon Tyne, Northumberland to Boulogne, Pas-de-Calais, France. She was refloated and put in to Harwich, Essex in a leaky condition.
Brothers	United Kingdom	The ship was damaged by fire at South Ferry, Forfarshire. She was on a voyage from Perth to London. She was refloated and resumed her voyage.
James A. Moore	United States	The ship was driven ashore at Sandy Hook, New Jersey. She was on a voyage from New York to Halifax, Nova Scotia, British North America. She was refloated and resumed her voyage.
Margaret	United Kingdom	The collier, a brig, was wrecked on the Gunfleet Sand, in the North Sea off the coast of Essex. Her crew were rescued. She was on a voyage from Hartlepool, County Durham to London.
Mary	United Kingdom	The smack was wrecked on the Cross Rocks Skerries, in the Irish Sea. Her crew were rescued. She was on a voyage from Newry, County Antrim to Dublin.
Phoebus	United Kingdom	The ship was driven ashore and wrecked at Aldeburgh, Suffolk with the loss of all hands. She was on a voyage from Newcastle upon Tyne, Northumberland to London.
Spy	United Kingdom	The smack was driven ashore and wrecked at "Black Ball", in Tor Bay.
Three Betseys	United Kingdom	The ship was run into by Victoria (United Kingdom) and sank in the River Thames at Gravesend, Kent. Her crew were rescued.
Trio	United Kingdom	The brig was wrecked on the coast of Finistère, France 25 nautical miles (46 km) north west of Brest with the loss of all but one of her ten crew. She was on a voyage from Montevideo, Uruguay to Plymouth, Devon.
Walkers	United Kingdom	The ship ran aground on the Mussel Scap, off the coast of County Durham. She was on a voyage from London to North Shields, County Durham. She was refloated and taken in to North Shields.
Wilhelmina Catharina	Netherlands	The ship departed from Banjoewangi, Netherlands East Indies for Amsterdam, North Holland. No further trace, presumed foundered with the loss of all hands.

== 10 January ==
List of shipwrecks: 10 January 1848
Ship	State	Description
Algerina	United Kingdom	The ship was in collision with Ann (United Kingdom) and sank in the North Sea 9 nautical miles (17 km) east of Hartlepool, County Durham. Her crew were rescued by Ann.
Dart	United Kingdom	The ship was run down and sunk in the Irish Sea by John Bolton (United Kingdom). Her crew survived. She was on a voyage from Preston, Lancashire to Drogheda, County Louth.
Emma	United Kingdom	The ship ran aground and was damaged at Dartmouth, Devon. She was refloated.
Endeavour	United Kingdom	The sloop was driven ashore at Larne, County Antrim. She was refloated in mid-February and towed in to Belfast for repairs.
Gebroeders	Danzig	The galiot was driven ashore north of Newburgh, Aberdeenshire, United Kingdom. Her crew were rescued. She was on a voyage from Danzig to Rotterdam, South Holland, Netherlands. She was refloated on 27 January and towed in to Aberdeen for repairs.
Mary	United Kingdom	The schooner was wrecked on the Knock Sand, in the North Sea off the coast of Lincolnshire. Her crew were rescued. She was on a voyage from Stockton-on-Tees, County Durham to Boston, Lincolnshire.
Mary Simpkin	United Kingdom	The ship capsized in the River Nene downstream of Sutton Bridge, Lincolnshire. She was on a voyage from Wisbech, Cambridgeshire to Newcastle upon Tyne, Northumberland. She was refloated on 14 January.
Six Hurrah's to the Queen	United Kingdom	The ship ran aground on the Whiting Sand, in the North Sea off the coast of Suffolk and sank. Her crew were rescued. She was on a voyage from Newcastle upon Tyne to Aldeburgh, Suffolk.

== 11 January ==
List of shipwrecks: 11 January 1848
Ship	State	Description
Blue Ridge	United States	The steamship suffered a boiler explosion and sank at Pittsburgh, Pennsylvania with the loss of 20 to 30 lives.
Duke of Cleveland	United Kingdom	The ship ran aground on the Whitby Rock and consequently sank in the North Sea. Her crew survived. She was on a voyage from South Shields, County Durham to London.
Emily	United Kingdom	The barque ran aground on the Herd Sand, in the North Sea off the coast of County Durham. She was on a voyage from South Shields to Havre de Grâce, Seine-Inférieure, France. Emily was refloated on 12 January and beached at South Shields in a severely damaged condition.
Grace	United Kingdom	The ship was driven ashore and severely damaged at the Inisgarth Lighthouse, County Mayo. She was on a voyage from Westport, County Mayo to Liverpool, Lancashire. She was refloated and put back to Westport.
Isabel	United Kingdom	The ship was driven ashore at St. John's, Antigua. She was on a voyage from Liverpool to St. John's. She was refloated.
Mary Clark	United Kingdom	The ship ran aground on the Whitby Rock. She was refloated and put in to Scarborough, Yorkshire in a leaky condition.
Mercure	France	The ship was driven ashore and wrecked east of Calais. She was on a voyage from Marseille, Bouches-du-Rhône to Dunkirk, Nord.
Paraguay	United Kingdom	The ship was wrecked near Farsund, Norway.
Record	United Kingdom	The brig ran aground on the Whitby Rock and was damaged. She put in to Bridlington, East Riding of Yorkshire to take on extra hands and resumed her voyage to Grimsby, Lincolnshire in a leaky condition.
Robert and Margaret	United Kingdom	The ship ran aground on the Whitby Rock. She was refloated and put in to Scarborough in a leaky condition.
Sunniside	United Kingdom	The ship ran aground on the Whitby Rock. She was refloated but consequently sank. Her crew were rescued.
Vulcan	Prussia	The ship was wrecked on the Jadder, in the North Sea. Her crew were rescued. She was on a voyage from Newcastle upon Tyne, Northumberland, United Kingdom to Königsberg.

== 12 January ==
List of shipwrecks: 12 January 1848
Ship	State	Description
Eagle	United Kingdom	The brig was wrecked on the Gunfleet Sand, in the North Sea off the coast of Essex. Her crew were rescued. She was on a voyage from South Shields, County Durham to London.
Emma	United Kingdom	The ship was holed by the anchor of Equity (United Kingdom) and was consequently beached at South Shields, County Durham.
Friends	United Kingdom	The ship sank in the North Sea 12 nautical miles (22 km) north by east of Wells-next-the-Sea, Norfolk. Her crew were rescued. She was on a voyage from Sunderland, County Durham to Whitstable, Kent.
Industrious	United Kingdom	The ship was wrecked at the mouth of the River Tay with the loss of all seven crew.
Marshall	Hamburg	The steamship ran aground on the Vogel Sand, in the North Sea. She was on a voyage from Glückstadt, Duchy of Holstein to Hull, Yorkshire, United Kingdom. She was refloated and resumed her voyage.
Pilada	Imperial Russian Navy	The corvette was struck by a tornado at Novorossiysk.
Trusty	(United Kingdom of Great Britain and Ireland) Guernsey	The brig ran aground on the Cross Sand, in the North Sea off the coast of Norfolk. She was on a voyage from Hartlepool, County Durham to Guernsey. She was refloated and put in to Great Yarmouth.

== 13 January ==
List of shipwrecks: 13 January 1848
Ship	State	Description
Active	United Kingdom	The sloop capsized off Skagen, Denmark with the loss of all hands. She subsequently drove ashore.
Albion	United Kingdom	The ship was in collision with the snow Amity and sank in the River Thames. She was on a voyage from London to Newcastle upon Tyne, Northumberland.
Aura	United Kingdom	The ship was driven ashore at Playa de Getares, Spain. She was on a voyage from Taganrog, Russia to Falmouth, Cornwall.
Duchesse d'Orleans	France	The ship was driven ashore at Sandy Hook, New Jersey, United States. She was on a voyage from Havre de Grâce, Seine-Inférieure to New York, United States. She was refloated on 17 January.
Expedit	Sweden	The ship collided with Aureo (Flag unknown) and sank at Trieste. She was on a voyage from Stockholm to Trieste.
Gostogay	Imperial Russian Navy	The transport ship was driven ashore at Novorossiysk. Her crew survived. She was refloated on 7 March.
Harvey	United Kingdom	The ship ran aground on the Maplin Sand, in the North Sea off the coast of Essex. She was refloated with the assistance of two smacks and two yawls.
Hilda	United Kingdom	The brig ran aground on the Goodwin Sands, Kent. Her crew were rescued. She was on a voyage from South Shields, County Durham to Constantinople, Ottoman Empire. She was refloated on 17 January and put in to Margate, Kent.
Istrebitel	Imperial Russian Navy	The steamship was driven ashore at Novorossiysk. Her crew were rescued. She was refloated on 8 March.
Johannes	Hamburg	The galeas foundered. Her crew were rescued by Maria (Flag unknown).
Palamed	Imperial Russian Navy	The brig was driven ashore and wrecked at Novorossiysk with the loss of five of her crew.
Pilada	Imperial Russian Navy	The corvette was driven ashore at Novorossiysk. Her crew were rescued on 15 January. She was refloated on 25 January. Subsequently repaired at Sevastopol.
Rita	United States	The ship was abandoned in the Atlantic Ocean. She was on a voyage from New Orleans, Louisiana to Barcelona, Spain. She was subsequently taken in to Key West, Florida.
Struya	Imperial Russian Navy	The tender sank at Novorossiysk with the loss of all 52 crew. She was refloated on 4 August and towed to Sevastopol by Bessarabia (Imperial Russian Navy). Subsequently repaired and returned to service.
William Kelson	(United Kingdom of Great Britain and Ireland) British North America	The ship departed from Cádiz, Spain for Newfoundland. Presumed subsequently foundered with the loss of all hands; a jolly boat was discovered off Old Perlican, Newfoundland before 6 March.

== 14 January ==
List of shipwrecks: 14 January 1848
Ship	State	Description
Ann and Jane	United Kingdom	The ship foundered in the Firth of Forth between the Isle of May and the North Carr Rock. Her crew were rescued. She was on a voyage from Leith, Lothian to Saint Andrews, Fife.
Hope	Norway	The ship was driven ashore at Bornholmen, 10 nautical miles (19 km) north of Bergen. She was on a voyage from Memel, Prussia to Porto, Portugal. She had become a wreck by 28 January.
Jane	United Kingdom	The sloop ran aground on the Horse Bank, in Liverpool Bay. She was on a voyage from Dundalk, County Louth to Liverpool, Lancashire.
Liskeard	United Kingdom	The ship was driven ashore in the Gut of Canso. She was on a voyage from Pictou, Nova Scotia, British North America to an English port.
Louise Victorine Barber	France	The ship was driven ashore near "Chateau Vert", Beylik of Tunis and was abandoned by her crew. She subsequently became a wreck.
Margarita	Malta	The brig was wrecked at Stora, Beylik of Tunis.
Pursuit	United Kingdom	The ship was driven ashore at Sutton Bridge, Lincolnshire.
Scotia	Malta	The paddle steamer was run into by a French vessel off Stora and was abandoned by her crew. She was beached the next day. She was declared a total loss.
Var	France	The ship was in collision with the brig Margarita (Malta) and was beached at Stora.
Victoria and Albert	United Kingdom	The ship ran aground on the Andrews Sand, in the North Sea off the coast of Essex. She was refloated and taken in to Harwich, Essex.

== 15 January ==
List of shipwrecks: January 1848
Ship	State	Description
Conrad	Bremen	The schooner was wrecked on the Longsand, in the North Sea off the coast of Essex. Her crew were rescued by HMRC Desmond ( Board of Customs). Conrad was on a voyage from Hartlepool, County Durham, United Kingdom to the West Indies.
Echo	(Russian Empire) Grand Duchy of Finland	The ship, master Renfors, ran aground and was severely damaged on the Spykeplaat, in the North Sea off the coast of Zeeland, Netherlands. She was on a voyage from Odesa to Antwerp, Belgium. She was towed to harbor 20.1.1848.
Jane and Martha	United Kingdom	The brig was driven ashore at Irvine, Ayrshire.
King of the Forest	United Kingdom	The ship ran aground on the Harry Furlong Reef, in the Irish Sea off the coast of Anglesey. She was on a voyage from Liverpool, Lancashire to Cardiff, Glamorgan. She was refloated and put in to Holyhead, Anglesey.
Lady Dombrain	United Kingdom	The ship ran aground and was damaged at Ballyshannon, County Donegal. She was on a voyage from Saint John, New Brunswick, British North America to Ballyshannon.
Mary	(United Kingdom of Great Britain and Ireland) Isle of Man	The smack was driven ashore south of Saltcoats, Ayrshire. She was refloated on 22 January.
Sapphire	United Kingdom	The schooner was wrecked at "Galita". Her crew were rescued by the brig Lord Lambton (United Kingdom). Sapphire was on a voyage from Malta to a British port.
White	United Kingdom	The ship struck the pier and sank at Fécamp, Seine-Inférieure, France. She was on a voyage from South Shields, County Durham to Fécamp.

== 16 January ==
List of shipwrecks: 16 January 1848
Ship	State	Description
Aurora	United Kingdom	The ship was driven ashore at Grado, Kingdom of Lombardy–Venetia.
Themis	United Kingdom	The ship was abandoned sank at "Sidi Jaia", Algeria. She was on a voyage from Alexandria, Egypt to Falmouth, Cornwall.

== 17 January ==
List of shipwrecks: 17 January 1848
Ship	State	Description
Dange	Prussia	The ship was driven ashore and wrecked 90 nautical miles (170 km) north of Bergen, Norway. She was on a voyage from Portsmouth, Hampshire, United Kingdom to Memel.
Glenarm Castle	United Kingdom	The ship ran aground on the Holm Sand, in the North Sea off the coast of Suffolk and sank. Her crew were rescued.
Idalia	United Kingdom	The ship was lost at the mouth of the Gironde with the loss of fourteen of her seventeen crew. She was on a voyage from Hartlepool, County Durham to Bordeaux, Gironde.
Lord Palmerston	United Kingdom	The ship was abandoned off Candia, Crete, Greece. Her crew were rescued by a French barque. She was on a voyage from Alexandria, Egypt Eyalet to a British port.
Margaret and Ann	United Kingdom	The ship was driven ashore at Étaples, Pas-de-Calais, France. Her crew were rescued. She was on a voyage from Sunderland, County Durham to Étaples. She was refloated on 22 January and taken in to Étaples.
Monarch	United Kingdom	The schooner foundered in the Mediterranean Sea (38°30′N 6°49′E) with the loss of one of her crew. Survivors were rescued by the brig Thurburn (United Kingdom) Monarch was on a voyage from Ipswich, Suffolk to Genoa, Kingdom of Sardinia.
HMS Spy	Royal Navy	The brigantine struck a sunken rock and was damaged at Valparaíso, Chile. She was taken in to Valparaíso for repairs.

== 18 January ==
List of shipwrecks: 18 January 1848
Ship	State	Description
Anna Elizabeth	Russia	The koff was lost off Heligoland. Her crew were rescued.
Bittern	United Kingdom	The brig was wrecked on a reef north west of Robben Island, Cape Colony. Her crew were rescued. She was on a voyage from South Shields, County Durham to Madras, India.
Despatch	United Kingdom	The ship ran aground on the Goodwin Sands, Kent and was abandoned by her crew. She was on a voyage from Newport, Monmouthshire to Perth. She was refloated the next day and taken in to Ramsgate, Kent.
Don Pedro	Portugal	The ship was driven ashore at Figueira da Foz. Her crew were rescued. She was on a voyage from Porto to Figueira da Foz.
Eagle	United Kingdom	The schooner struck rocks off St. Agnes, Isles of Scilly and foundered. Her crew survived. She was on a voyage from Glasgow, Renfrewshire to the Charente.
Gem	United Kingdom	The ship ran aground on the Sunk Sand, in the North Sea off the coast of Lincolnshire. She was on a voyage from King's Lynn, Norfolk to Gainsborough, Lincolnshire. She was refloated and out in to Grimsby, Lincolnshire for repairs.
Hermann	Bremen	The koff was lost off Heligoland. Her crew were rescued.
Humber	United Kingdom	The ship was wrecked at Lerwick, Shetland Islands.
Meaburn	United Kingdom	The schooner ran aground on the Redcar Rock and was damaged. She was consequently beached at Seaton, County Durham. She was refloated and towed in to Middlesbrough, Yorkshire.
Triton	United Kingdom	The ship was driven ashore at Bridlington, Yorkshire. She was on a voyage from Bridlington to Sunderland. She was refloated and put back to Bridlington.
Viceroy	United Kingdom	The paddle steamer was damaged by fire off the Corsewall Lighthouse, Wigtownshire. She was on a voyage from Glasgow, Renfrewshire to Dublin. She put in to Loch Ryan where the fire was extinguished. She put back to Greenock, Renfrewshire where she was repaired and subsequently returned to service.

== 19 January ==
List of shipwrecks: 19 January 1848
Ship	State	Description
Concordia	Kingdom of Hanover	The ship was driven ashore on Noss, Shetland Islands, United Kingdom with the loss of ten of her twelve crew. She was on a voyage from Ferrol, Spain to Emden or Bremen.
Peri	(United Kingdom of Great Britain and Ireland) South Australia	The ship ran aground and capsized south of Snapper Point. She was on a voyage from Adelaide to Launceston, Van Diemen's Land.
William Carson	United Kingdom	The ship struck a rock and sank off Cape Palos, Spain. Her crew were rescued.

== 20 January ==
List of shipwrecks: 20 January 1848
Ship	State	Description
Adieu, or Odine	United Kingdom	The ship was run into by Raven (United Kingdom) and sank off Beaumaris, Anglesey. Her crew were rescued. She was on a voyage from Bangor, Caernarfonshire to Liverpool, Lancashire.
David	United Kingdom	The ship ran aground at Kilrush, County Clare.
Mary Ann	United States	The ship sprang a leak and was abandoned off Cape St. Vincent, Portugal with the loss of four of her crew. Survivors were rescued by Kentucky (United States). Mary Ann was on a voyage from New York to Cádiz, Spain.
Tiger	United Kingdom	The paddle tug collided with the paddle tug Messenger (United Kingdom) and sank in the River Tyne. She was subsequently refloated and scrapped.

== 21 January ==
List of shipwrecks: 21 January 1848
Ship	State	Description
Bangol	Netherlands	The ship was sighted in the South Atlantic whilst on a voyage from Batavia, Netherlands East Indies to Rotterdam, South Holland. No further trace, presumed foundered with the loss of all hands.
Eliza	United Kingdom	The ship was wrecked on the Gunfleet Sand, in the North Sea off the coast of Essex. Her crew were rescued. She was on a voyage from Ridley, Northumberland to London.
Mona's Queen	United Kingdom	The ship struck a sunken rock off Dunfanaghy, County Donegal. She was on a voyage from Dunfanaghy to Liverpool, Lancashire or Runcorn, Cheshire. She was refloated.
Robert Burns	United Kingdom	The schooner was driven ashore at Stromness, Orkney Islands. She was on a voyage from Newcastle upon Tyne, Northumberland to Belfast, County Antrim. She was refloated and put back to Stromness in a leaky condition.

== 22 January ==
List of shipwrecks: 22 January 1848
Ship	State	Description
Leontes	United Kingdom	The ship was last sighted on this date whist on a voyage from Ceylon to London. Presumed subsequently foundered with the loss of all hands.
Margaret	United Kingdom	The ship was driven ashore at Stromness, Orkney Islands. She was on a voyage from a Baltic port to Liverpool, Lancashire.
Molson	United Kingdom	The brig was wrecked on Molène, Finistère, France. Her crew were rescued. She was on a voyage from Newcastle upon Tyne, Northumberland to Brest, Finistère.
Palladium	United Kingdom	The ship ran aground on the Nore. She was refloated and proceeded for London.
Panope	United Kingdom	The brig capsized at Cardiff, Glamorgan.
Sarah and Maria	United Kingdom	The ship ran aground in the River Shannon.
Speedwell	United Kingdom	The ship was severely damaged by fire at Harwich, Essex.

== 23 January ==
List of shipwrecks: 23 January 1848
Ship	State	Description
Aram	United Kingdom	The steamship collided with Susquehanna (United States) and foundered in the Atlantic Ocean 40 nautical miles (74 km) south west of the Tuskar Rock with the loss of six of her 26 crew. Survivors were rescued by Susquehanna. Aram was on a voyage from Liverpool to Malta and Constantinople, Ottoman Empire.
Catharina	Norway	The ship was abandoned in the North Sea with the loss of a crew member. Her crew were rescued by the hooker Noerdzee (Netherlands). Catharina was on a voyage from Hull, Yorkshire, United Kingdom to Norway.
James and Isabella	United Kingdom	The ship struck Patterson's Rock and subsequently came ashore and was wrecked on Sanda Island, Argyllshire. Her crew survived. She was on a voyage from Belfast, County Antrim to Glasgow, Renfrewshire.
Maid of the Mill	United Kingdom	The ship was driven ashore in Cloghy Bay. She was on a voyage from Trinidad to the Clyde. She was later refloated and taken in to Campbeltown, Argyllshire.
Robert Heddle	United Kingdom	The ship ran aground and was damaged at Ramsgate, Kent. She was on a voyage from Sierra Leone to Ramsgate. She was refloated the next day.
Wear	United Kingdom	The ship was wrecked on the Gunfleet Sand, in the North Sea off the coast of Essex. Her crew were rescued.

== 24 January ==
List of shipwrecks: 24 January 1848
Ship	State	Description
Brechin Castle	United Kingdom	The ship ran aground and was damaged at South Shields, County Durham. She was refloated and put back to South Shields.
Dromingen	Norway	The brig ran aground on the Haisborough Sands, in the North Sea off the coast of Norfolk, United Kingdom. She was on a voyage from Christiansand to Rochefort, Charente-Maritime, France. She was refloated and taken in to Great Yarmouth, Norfolk in a waterlogged condition.
Glenturret	United Kingdom	The ship ran aground on the Haisborough Sands and was abandoned by her crew. She was on a voyage from Hartlepool, County Durham to Southampton, Hampshire.
Grossfurst Vladimir	Russia	The ship capsized at Teignmouth, Devon, United Kingdom. She was on a voyage from Saint Petersburg to Livorno, Grand Duchy of Tuscany.
Jane	United Kingdom	The brig ran aground off Sunderland, County Durham. She was refloated and put back to Sunderland.
Johnstown	United Kingdom	The ship was driven ashore and sank at Happisburgh, Norfolk. Her crew were rescued.
Nordstiernen	Norway	The brig ran aground on the Haisborough Sands. She was on a voyage from Christiansand to Morlaix, Finistère, France. She was refloated and taken in to Great Yarmouth in a waterlogged condition.
Pilot	United Kingdom	The schooner was driven ashore at the mouth of the River Tay. She was on a voyage from Newburgh, Fife to Leith, Lothian. she was refloated and taken in to Leith.
Robert Heddie	United Kingdom	The ship ran aground and was damaged at Ramsgate, Kent. She was refloated.
Sun	United Kingdom	The brig ran aground at Sunderland. She was refloated and put back to Sunderland.

== 25 January ==
List of shipwrecks: 25 January 1848
Ship	State	Description
Catherine	United Kingdom	The ship ran aground on the Nore. She capsized on 27 January and was abandoned. Her crew were rescued by a smack. She was on a voyage from South Shields, County Durham to London.
Cuvier	French Navy	The paddle corvette was destroyed by fire and sank near Palma, Mallorca, Spain. All on board were rescued.
Eleanor	United Kingdom	The ship ran aground on the South Bank, in Carnarvon Bay. She was on a voyage from Pwllheli, Caernarfonshire to Liverpool, Lancashire or vice versa.
Elizabeth Jane	United Kingdom	The ship foundered 40 nautical miles (74 km) off Christiansand, Norway. Her crew were rescued. She was on a voyage from Liverpool to Newcastle upon Tyne, Northumberland.
George	Netherlands	The ship was lost in the White Sea. She was on a voyage from Arkhangelsk, Russia to the Zaan.
John Elliotson	United Kingdom	The brig ran aground on the Black Tail Sand, in the Thames Estuary off the coast of Kent. She was refloated.
Ora	Denmark	The schooner was driven ashore near Santa Cruz de Tenerife, Canary Islands.
Stafford	United Kingdom	The ship was wrecked on the Black Tail Sand. Her crew were rescued by the barque Fame (United Kingdom). Stafford was on a voyage from South Shields to London.

== 26 January ==
List of shipwrecks: 26 January 1848
Ship	State	Description
Alceste	United Kingdom	The barque ran aground on Holy Island, in the Firth of Clyde and sank. Her crew were rescued. She was on a voyage from Greenock, Renfrewshire to Trinidad.
Emmanuel	United Kingdom	The ship struck the Grunes Rock, off Guernsey, Channel Islands and was damaged. She was on a voyage from Quebec City, Province of Canada, British North America to Hull, Yorkshire. She out in to Jersey, Channel Islands on 2 February in a waterlogged condition.
Huntress	United Kingdom	The ship ran aground on the Point Pleasant Shoal, off the coast of Nova Scotia, British North America. She was on a voyage from London to Halifax, Nova Scotia. She was later refloated and resumed her voyage, arriving at Halifax on 31 January.
William	United Kingdom	The Humber keel struck the Plough Seat Rock, off the coast of Northumberland and foundered. Both crew survived. She was on a voyage from Newcastle upon Tyne, Northumberland to Grangemouth, Stirlingshire.

== 27 January ==
List of shipwrecks: 27 January 1848
Ship	State	Description
Lady Kenmare	United Kingdom	The ship was wrecked at Goodwick, Pembrokeshire. She was on a voyage from the Clyde to Bristol, Gloucestershire.
Lord Nelson	United Kingdom	The cutter was driven ashore and severely damaged at Dundalk, County Louth. Her crew were rescued. She was on a voyage from Liverpool, Lancashire to Africa. She capsized on 28 January, but was refloated on 2 February.

== 28 January ==
List of shipwrecks: 28 January 1848
Ship	State	Description
Active	United Kingdom	The schooner was abandoned off the Isle of May, in the Firth of Forth. Both crew were rescued. She was subsequently driven ashore west of Pittenweem, Fife.
Dee	United Kingdom	The smack was driven ashore in Glenarm Bay. She was on a voyage from Liverpool, Lancashire to Glenarm, County Antrim. She was refloated on 1 February and taken in to Glenarm.
Diligence	United Kingdom	The ship was wrecked on the Maplin Sand, in the North Sea off the coast of Essex. She was on a voyage from Sunderland, County Durham to London.
Elizabeth	United Kingdom	The ship was driven ashore at Coalhouse Fort, Essex.
Margaret	United Kingdom	The ship was driven ashore at Stromness, Orkney Islands. she was on a voyage from a Baltic port to Liverpool.
Mars	United Kingdom	The ship ran aground and was damaged on the Jenkin Sand, in the Thames Estuary. She was refloated on 4 February and towed in to Southend-on-Sea, Essex.
Pearl	United Kingdom	The ship was driven ashore at Coalhouse Fort.
Sunderland Packet	United Kingdom	The full-rigged ship sprang a leak in the North Sea off Flamborough Head, Yorkshire. She foundered off Inchkeith the next day. Her crew survived. Sunderland Packet was on a voyage from Leith, Lothian to London.
Valentine	France	The ship was lost near Livorno, Grand Duchy of Tuscany. She was on a voyage from Livorno to Noirmoutier, Vendée and Nantes, Loire-Inférieure.

== 29 January ==
List of shipwrecks: 29 January 1848
Ship	State	Description
Ann	United Kingdom	The ship was driven ashore in the Yangtze at Shanghai, China. She was refloated.
Christina	United Kingdom	The ship struck a sunken rock and was damaged at Valparaíso, Chile. She was on a voyage from Cobija, Chile to Valparaíso. She was taken in to port for repairs.
Endeavour	United Kingdom	The ship was abandoned off Dundee, Forfarshire with the loss of all six of her crew. She was taken in to Dundee in a derelict condition the next day.
Honour	United Kingdom	The ship was driven ashore and wrecked at Warkworth, Northumberland.
Lady Mary	United Kingdom	The ship struck a sunken rock in Branshay Bay and was subsequently destroyed by fire. Her crew were rescued. she was on a voyage from Newcastle upon Tyne, Northumberland to Dublin.
Morris	United Kingdom	The schooner was wrecked on Islay, Inner Hebrides. her crew survived.
Ocean Maid	United Kingdom	The schooner was driven ashore at Whitburn, County Durham. She was on a voyage from Great Yarmouth, Norfolk to South Shields, County Durham. She was refloated on 2 February and beached at Sunderland, County Durham.
Teviot	United Kingdom	The paddle steamer ran aground off the Isle of Wight.

== 30 January ==
List of shipwrecks: 30 January 1848
Ship	State	Description
Albion	United Kingdom	The ship was driven ashore at Shoeburyness, Essex. She was on a voyage from London to Goole, Yorkshire. She was refloated with the assistance from two smacks.
America	United States	The ship ran aground at New Orleans, Louisiana.
Ashbury	United Kingdom	The sloop ran aground on the Whitby Rock. She was on a voyage from Hull, Yorkshire to Stockton-on-Tees, County Durham. She was refloated and resumed her voyage.
Avalon	United Kingdom	The ship was wrecked in The Narrows with the loss of five of her ten crew. She was on a voyage from the Clyde to Saint John's, Newfoundland, British North America.
Danube	United Kingdom	The brigantine foundered 20 nautical miles (37 km) off Inishtrahull, County Donegal. Her crew survived. She was on a voyage from Troon, Ayrshire to Galaţi, Ottoman Empire.
Elizabeth	United Kingdom	The ship was driven ashore at Redcar, Yorkshire. She was refloated.
Emmanuel	United Kingdom	The barque was wrecked on Guernsey, Channel Islands. Her crew survived.
Hortense	France	The ship was lost at the mouth of the Ande.
Sapphiras	United Kingdom	The ship departed from Bombay, India for Liverpool, Lancashire. No further trace, presumed foundered with the loss of all hands.
Stanley	United Kingdom	The ship was driven ashore at Redcar. She was refloated.

== 31 January ==
List of shipwrecks: 31 January 1848
Ship	State	Description
Hannibal	United Kingdom	The ship was wrecked off the Orkney Islands with the loss of fifteen of her seventeen crew. A survivor died on 7 February. She was subsequently driven ashore at "Biornose", Norway and the survivor was rescued. Hannibal was later refloated, repaired and returned to her homeport of Peterhead, Aberdeenshire, where she arrived on 19 April.
Jane and Catherine	United Kingdom	The ship was driven ashore at Fraserburgh, Aberdeenshire.
Queen Esther	United Kingdom	The ship was holed by an anchor and beached at Plymouth, Devon. She was refloated on 7 February and taken in to Plymouth.
Sir Robert Campbell	United Kingdom	The ship ran aground near Algeciras, Spain. She was on a voyage from Alicante, Spain to Newfoundland, British North America.
Sumatra	France	The ship was driven ashore at "Guarda Vieja", Spain. She was on a voyage from Baltimore, Maryland, United States to Marseille, Bouches-du-Rhône.

== Unknown date ==
List of shipwrecks: Unknown date in January 1848
Ship	State	Description
Avenir de Carentan	France	The ship was wrecked on the Île d'Oléron, Charente-Maritime before 15 January. She was on a voyage from Sunderland, County Durham, United Kingdom to Bordeaux, Gironde.
Bahireh	(Ottoman Empire) Egyptian Navy	The frigate was wrecked at "Cattarina".
Clyde	United Kingdom	The ship ran aground on the Haisborough Sands, in the North Sea off the coast of Norfolk. She was on a voyage from Hull, Yorkshire to New Orleans, Louisiana, United States. She was refloated an put back to Hull, arriving on 4 January.
David and Robert	United Kingdom	The ship foundered off the mouth of the River Tay with the loss of all hands before 8 January.
Dove	United Kingdom	The ship foundered off Sicily before 30 January. Her crew were rescued by Giovannino (Flag unknown). Dove was on a voyage from Glasgow, Renfrewshire to Genoa, Kingdom of Sardinia.
Egremont	(United Kingdom of Great Britain and Ireland) British North America	The ship departed from Baltimore, Maryland, United States for Londonderry. No further trace, presumed foundered with the loss of all hands.
Eliezer	United Kingdom	The ship was wrecked on the Gunfleet Sand, in the North Sea off the coast of Essex. Her crew survived.
Eliza	United Kingdom	The ship was lost off Holkham, Norfolk. She was on a voyage from Thornham, Norfolk to Liverpool, Lancashire.
Elizabeth	United Kingdom	The barque foundered in the North Sea before 2 January. Her crew were rescued by Mary Mitcheson (United Kingdom).
Emma	Prussia	The ship foundered in the North Sea off the coast of Aberdeenshire, United Kingdom before 12 January.
Industry	United Kingdom	The ship foundered off the mouth of the River Tay with the loss of all hands before 8 January.
Isabella	United Kingdom	The ship was lost before 5 January whilst on a voyage from Aberdeen to Lerwick, Shetland Islands.
Jan Willem	Netherlands	The ship was abandoned in the Atlantic Ocean before 20 January. She was on a voyage from Hartlepool, County Durham, United Kingdom to Constantinople, Ottoman Empire.
Jeune Anais	France	The ship was lost near Fort Mahon, Mallorca, Spain. She was on a voyage from Marseille, Bouches-du-Rhône to Guadeloupe.
Joseph Howe	United Kingdom	The ship was wrecked near Baleine, Nova Scotia, British North America. Her crew were rescued. She was on a voyage from Saint John's, Newfoundland to Halifax, Nova Scotia.
Julie	France	The ship was driven ashore at Saint-Martin-de-Ré, Île de Ré, Charente-Maritime before 26 January. She was refloated and taken in to Saint-Martin-de-Ré.
Latrobe	United States	The ship was driven ashore 25 nautical miles (46 km) north of Cape Hatteras, North Carolina and broke in two. She was on a voyage from New Orleans, Louisiana to Baltimore, Maryland.
Liverpool	United States	The ship was wrecked on Cayo Verde, in the Bahama Channel before 27 January. She was on a voyage from A Coruña, Spain to New Orleans, Louisiana.
Maria Therese	Belgium	The ship was lost at the mouth of the Loire before 22 January.
Michael Williams	United Kingdom	The ship caught fire off the coast of Patagonia, Argentina and was abandoned by her crew. She was on a voyage from the Bristol Channel to Valparaíso, Chile.
Minerva	(Russian Empire) Grand Duchy of Finland	The ship was abandoned in the North Sea with the loss of four of her crew. She was on a voyage from Riga, Russia to Cette, Hérault, France.
Nightingale	(United Kingdom of Great Britain and Ireland) Antigua	The sloop was driven ashore on Saint John's Island, Virgin Islands. She was on a voyage from Saint Kitts to Antigua.
Pym	United Kingdom	The ship was wrecked at the mouth of the Rio Grande. She was on a voyage from Liverpool to the Rio Grande.
Reindeer	United Kingdom	The ship ran aground on the Nore. She was refloated on 28 January and beached near Southend-on-Sea.
Stephanie	France	The ship was wrecked at Quimperlé, Finistère before 15 January.
St. Pierre	France	The ship was wrecked on the Île d'Oléron before 15 January. She was on a voyage from Sunderland to Bordeaux.
Tennessee	United States	The ship ran aground on Orange Key before 8 January. She was on a voyage from Bremen to New Orleans, Louisiana. She was refloated and taken in to Nassau, Bahamas.
Unicorn	United Kingdom	The sloop was lost in the North Sea off the coast of Lothian before 11 January.
Zenobia	United Kingdom	The ship ran aground and was severely damaged in the River Mersey. She was on a voyage from Saint Petersburg, Russia to Liverpool. She was refloated on 15 January.
