= Kemptown =

Kemptown may refer to:

- Kemptown, Brighton, England
  - Kemp Town, a prestigious residential estate in Brighton
- Kemptown, Nova Scotia, Canada
