= Dagger Woods, Nova Scotia =

Community in Nova Scotia, Canada

Coordinates: 45°35′36″N 61°50′26″W

Dagger Woods in Nova Scotia

Dagger Woods is a community in the Canadian province of Nova Scotia, located in Antigonish County. It is a small rural settlement consisting of trees and marshland. The community lies east of the town of Antigonish, the site of St. Francis Xavier University.

== Geography ==
Dagger Woods is located along Highway 104, a part of the Trans-Canada Highway system, in eastern Antigonish County. It is accessed by Dagger Woods Road, which connects residents and the surrounding woods to the highway.

== Folklore ==
A story associated with the woods is found in Steve Vernon's Haunted Harbours. Folklore describes a creature called the 'Hidey-Hinder' as a skulking monster sometimes regarded as a ghost that howls in the forest. This legend has also inspired the virtual reality video game titled 'Dagger Woods VR', which was locally released in 2025.
