= Broadway, Nova Scotia =

Community in Nova Scotia, Canada

Coordinates: 45°34′32.16″N 62°21′56.81″W

Broadway in Nova Scotia

Broadway is a small community in the Canadian province of Nova Scotia, located in Pictou County. It is on Nova Scotia Trunk 4.
