= Monastery station =

Railway station in Nova Scotia, Canada

Monastery

General information
- Location: Monastery, Nova Scotia; Canada
- Coordinates: 45°36′30″N 61°36′50″W

History
- Closed: 1990
Location

Monastery station was a VIA Rail station in Monastery, Nova Scotia.

The station was operated by Canadian National Railway and later by VIA Rail, but has not been served by passenger trains since 1990.
