= Aulds Cove =

Community in Nova Scotia, Canada

Coordinates: 45°38′55.85″N 61°26′25.27″W

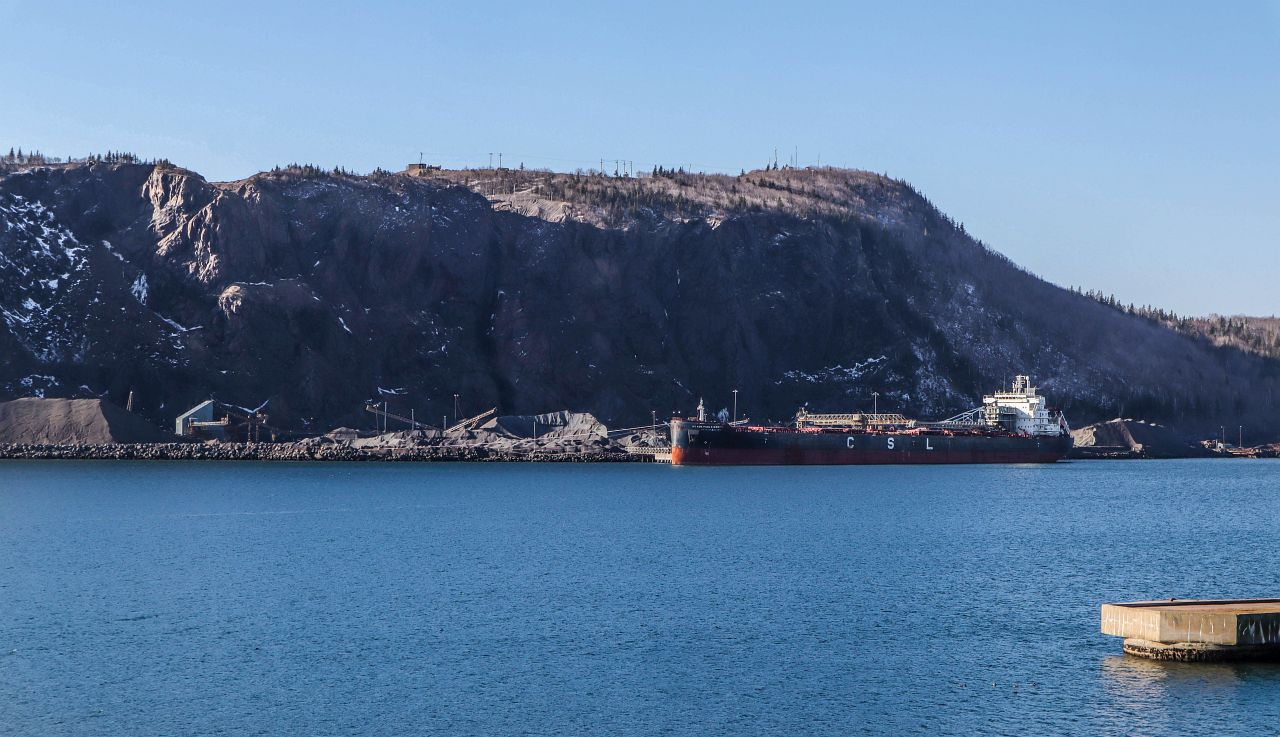
Rock Quarry at Aulds Cove

Aulds Cove in Nova Scotia

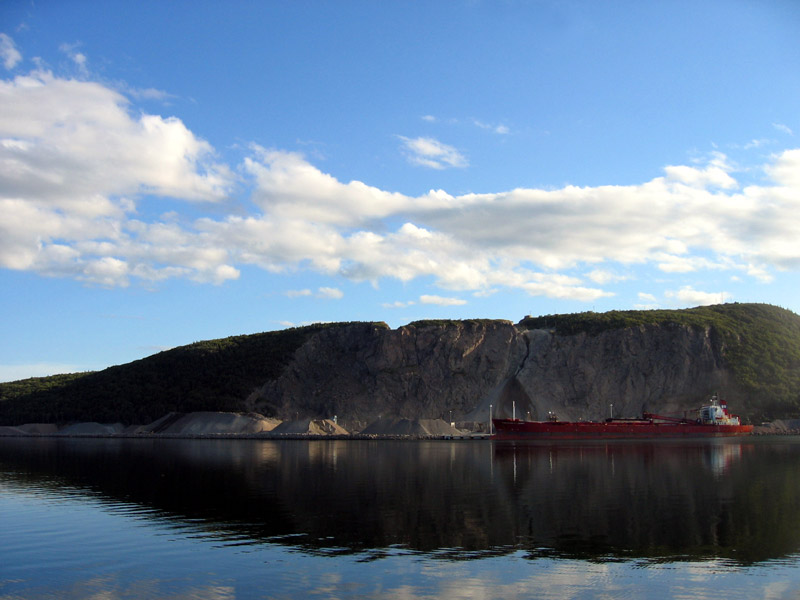
Porcupine Mountain rock quarry, Aulds Cove

Aulds Cove (Scottish Gaelic: Camus an Tuirc-nimhe - "Bay of the Porcupine") is a community in the Canadian province of Nova Scotia, located in both Antigonish County and Guysborough County.

Situated on the western shore of the Strait of Canso, Aulds Cove is bifurcated by the county line. The northern section of the community is located in Antigonish County and the southern section is located in Guysborough County. Aulds Cove is directly opposite the community of Port Hastings located on Cape Breton Island. The community is thought to have derived its name from Alexander Auld, an early settler who had grist and saw mills at this location.

In 1955, the Canso Causeway opened, connecting the southern part of Aulds Cove with Port Hastings by road and railway. As part of this project, new alignments of Nova Scotia Trunk 4 and the Canadian National Railway (CNR) were built through the community. A large quarry on Cape Porcupine Mountain was also built at the southern end of Aulds Cove to supply fill material for the causeway; as of 2015, this quarry continues to operate in its sixth decade.

In the 1960s, the section of Trunk 4 through the community was upgraded as part of the Trans-Canada Highway project and re-designated Nova Scotia Highway 104. Several motels, gas stations, and restaurants have opened in the last few decades and today Aulds Cove primarily serves as a service centre for motorists on Highway 104.
