= Mount Thom, Nova Scotia =

Community in Nova Scotia, Canada

Coordinates: 45°30′40″N 63°0′53″W

Mount Thom
- Unincorporated Community

Area
  - Land: 63 km^{2} (24 sq mi)

Population
  - Total: 187
  - Density: 2.964/km^{2} (7.68/sq mi)

Mount Thom in Nova Scotia

Mount Thom is a community in the Canadian province of Nova Scotia, located in Pictou County. It is at an elevation of 200m and is situated on Nova Scotia Trunk 4. Mount Thom has an estimated population of 187 as of 2024.

Mount Thom is also the name of a hill to the east of the community and on the other side of the highway. It has an elevation of 250m.
