= James River, Nova Scotia =

Community in Nova Scotia, Canada

Coordinates: 45°34′12.8″N 62°7′54.35″W

James River in Nova Scotia

James River (Scottish Gaelic: Abhainn Sheumais) is a community in the Canadian province of Nova Scotia, located in Antigonish County. The Riverside International Speedway is located here.

== Etymology ==
James River may have been named for the Reverend James Munro, a Presbyterian minister who settled in the Antigonish area in 1797, remaining there from 1808 to 1818.
