= Cannes, Nova Scotia =

Locality in Nova Scotia, Canada

Coordinates: 45°38′28.64″N 60°57′43.58″W

Cannes in Nova Scotia

Cannes is a locality in the Canadian province of Nova Scotia, located in Richmond County. It was named after Cannes in France.
