= Cleveland, Nova Scotia =

Community in Nova Scotia, Canada

Coordinates: 45°40′6.69″N 61°13′57.52″W

Cleveland in Nova Scotia

Cleveland is a small community in the Canadian province of Nova Scotia, located in Richmond County. The community was named in 1891 after the president of the United States Grover Cleveland.
