= Afton, Nova Scotia =

Community in Nova Scotia, Canada

Coordinates: 45°36′28″N 61°42′48″W

Afton in Nova Scotia

Afton is a community in the Canadian province of Nova Scotia, located in Antigonish County. The area was settled by Irish farmers in the early 1800s. Afton is likely named after the poem "Flow Gently, Sweet Afton" by Robert Burns.
