= Lower River Inhabitants, Nova Scotia =

Community in Nova Scotia, Canada

Coordinates: 45°36′50.1″N 61°14′25.32″W

Lower River Inhabitants in Nova Scotia

Lower River Inhabitants is a small community in the Canadian province of Nova Scotia, located in Richmond County in Cape Breton Island. The River Inhabitants is born out of tributaries from the hills of Kingsville, Inverness County. These tributaries join to first form two branches of the River Inhabitants in Kingsville, which join together at Princeville, Inverness County. The main river then flows down through the communities of Princeville, Riverside, Cleveland, Grantville, Hureauville, and Lower River Inhabitants/Evanston to join Inhabitants Bay, known locally as Basin Inhabitants or Whiteside Basin. Port Hawkesbury is the market town of Lower River Inhabitants communities.

== Settlement history ==
The Mi'kmaq are Cape Breton's indigenous population and their encounters with Europeans began with explorers and traders, then the colonizers. There are no current Mi'kmaq communities in Lower River Inhabitants, the closest being Potlotek/ Chapel Island.

=== The French ===
The land along the River Inhabitants was first settled, in the early 1600s, by the French from France and some Acadians from mainland Nova Scotia, when Cape Breton Island was owned by France and called Ile Royale. This was done under Sieur de Mont, and the settlers known to the French Government officials as habitants, were supplied by that government with tools, seed, food enough for two years, and farm animals to begin their farming along the river. That is why the river was called Riviére des Habitants, now known in English as River Inhabitants. At that time some family names to be found along the river were, Boudrot, Boucher, Decoste, Fougére, Hureau, Landry, LeBlanc, Nagereau, and Richard.

After the last fall of Louisburg in 1758, when Ile Royale became Cape Breton under the English, the English Government's policy of expelling all Acadian and French settlers was extended to the island. However, this phase of the expulsion was less successful than that carried out on the mainland from 1755 on, because the Acadian and other French settlers on Cape Breton knew what had happened on the mainland. Therefore, when the settlers saw British Man-of-war Navy ships or any other ship flying a Union Jack Flag coming into sight, they fled into the woods, if they could do so, and remained there until the ships and any British soldiers had gone. Only a small number were captured and expelled. The others, however, could not always return to their farms, for farms along the River Inhabitants were burnt by the British on their way to lay siege to Louisbourg. From Riviére des Habitants the British took all the animals and stored food crops to supply their siege against Louisbourg. All the settlers or descendants of the settlers, who were burnt out, had to spend their winters in the lodges of the Mi’kmaq, who were their friends, and often relatives. The next spring the settlers would leave their hosts and go to Ile Madame. On that island the Acadian and the French settlers were not being expelled. The French Huguenots, like the Bourinots, Levescontes, Ameys and Georges, who were allies of the British and used the Catholic Acadians as workers, requested that their workers not be expelled, and were granted that request. There the refugees would blend in with the population. After the threat of expulsion, had passed, they and their descendants were able to settle back on the main island of Cape Breton at places like Louisdale, River Bourgeois, etc.

=== The Loyalists ===
With the removal of the French settlers from along the Inhabitants River, land became available for settlement by people considered to be more sympathetic to British rule. These settlers were the Empire Loyalists, who had fled persecution of the citizens of the new United States of America during and shortly after the American Revolutionary War. These new settlers, many of whom were first given grants of land in Eastern Guysborough County, then known as Manchester, demanded good farmland, and were given grants along both sides of the River Inhabitants. Grant, King, McCarthy, Oliver, Proctor, Redmond, Upton and Whalen, were Empire Loyalist families to be found on those grants. The descendants of these Loyalist families can still be found within the communities of Evanston, Grantville, Hureauville, and Whiteside.

=== Acadian return ===
Shortly before and after the arrival of the Loyalists, some of the Acadian families had made their way back to a part of the River Inhabitant Valley, where they established small farms and did some fishing in the river. Hureauville, named after one of the families that resettled there, is the community under discussion. DeCoste and Richard were the other families that resettled in that community.

Just north of them, over the hill was Grantville, a largely Protestant community of Scottish settlers, which was using a cemetery containing the remains of some of the French settlers, who had lived in that area prior to the expulsion and burning previously mentioned. Frequently, while digging graves to bury deceased Protestant persons from Cleveland or Grantville, those doing the digging would uncover the deceased's skeleton remains with rosaries or crosses, positive evidence of the existence of the previous French settlements. Some of the descendants of the Acadians who returned to the area, plus others from Isle Madame and Louisdale married in with the English speaking residents, so that now many residents of the community area are of mixed ethnic background. As well, within the last three decades, families of Acadian descent from the Petit de Great area, whose forefathers may well have lived in the Inhabitants River area in previous centuries, have relocated to the area.

=== The Scots ===
Along with the resettlement of the Acadians and the grants to Loyalists, came the settlement of some Scots families like Ferguson, MacDonald, Malcolm, some of whom left Scotland because they were pushed out by greedy Lairds, who wanted their holdings for the raising of sheep—a shameful time in the history of Scotland, known as the clearings or clearances.. Descendants of these Scot settlers can still be found in the communities along the Inhabitants River, in Kempt Road, and in Walkerville and Whiteside, which are along the shore of Inhabitants Basin.

=== The Irish ===
In addition to the groups of settlers mentioned, came the Irish at the very beginning of the 1800s. These were the refugees from the Wexford Uprising (rebellion) of 1798 who, in hiding from the British authorities, settled well back in the woods bordering on the Inhabitants Basin, until it was safe to move nearer the shore of the Basin. These refugees, most of whom settled in Rocky Bay on Isle Madame and the Margarees in Inverness County, had reason to be fearful under the Penal Laws.

Not only were their lives to be extinguished as traitors for daring to fight against the British crown, if they were unfortunate enough to be discovered by the authorities, but, according to British Penal Laws, it was illegal for them to be in British North America. These refugees were represented by the families of Doyle, Cloak, Dunphy, Hayes, Lamey, Morgan, possibly Scanlan (formerly Scantling), possibly Tyrrell (formerly Farrell), Welsh and White.

Only the family names of Doyle, Hayes, Morgan, Scanlan, and White families can still be found in the Basin - River Inhabitants communities today, though the genes of the others flow in the veins of both these, as well as in the veins of the Loyalist descents, of some of the Scottish descents, and of some of Acadian descent. The Cloaks and the Welsh's moved away from the area, with the remaining old people dying out. The Tyrrells and the Dunphys moved to the Isle Madame area during the early 1900s.

Some of the Irish of Whiteside had a connection with John Fitzgerald Kennedy’s mother, Rose Kennedy. She was born of a Wexford Uprising refugee family, the FitzGerald family, and was actually a cousin to the Basin Road, Whiteside, Doyles* and Morgan families. Both families were descendant relatives of Lord Edward Fitzgerald, one of the most important leaders of the 1798 Wexford Uprising. The Morgans and Doyles were descendants on their mother's side, Mary Fitzgerald, while Rose was a descendant on her father's side. It wasn't only because he participated in the uprising, that Mary's son, Edward John Morgan Sr., spent the remainder of his life as a refugee hiding deep in the woods of Basin Inhabitants on a hundred acres. As close relative of Lord Fitzgerald, Edward Morgan, he believed that the Amnesty of 1803 did not apply to him, and that the British would hang, draw and quarter him, if he were to be caught. Indeed, back in Ireland all the Morgans left in Limerick had been vengefully exterminated by the English forces after the put-down of the uprising. Long after the Amnesty and their father's and grandfather's death, his children, grandchildren and great-grandchildren kept the secret. The history of Ireland has Edward John killed at the Battle of Vinegar Hill, outside Wexford Town. If they ever knew, Ireland's historians seem unaware that such a large number of 1798 Wexford Uprising refugees had escape to the new world, many with the help of the people from Scotland.

- It is through intermarriage with the Morgans that the Doyles can also claim descent from Lord Fitzgerald.

The most common Irish name, McNamara, to be found in the communities of the Basin and river inhabitants, is not one of the refugee families but are descendants of a David McNamara, who arrived in Guysborough County from Boston around 1784 - 1790, the same time as did the Loyalists, and married a Sarah Horne (daughter of Jacob Horne) at Halifax,. The couple returned to Boston for a short time and then McNamara resettled in Cape Breton, with the permission of the then General Nepean, on Boucher Island in the Basin Inhabitants. He "received a warrant for land on the Island of Bushey, River Inhabitants, in August, 1807" and after two attempts, first as a native of Cape Breton in this 1817 petition "Petition to Ainslie: Petitioner, age 49, a native of Cape Breton" and then secondly, as a Scotsman in this 1819 petition "Petition to Ainslie: Petitioner, age 49, emigrated from Scotland twelve years before" he was finally granted the island which was renamed McNamara Island. There the McNamara's first multiplied and flourished, until the island was abandoned by that family in the later part of the 19th century (according to one of David's great-great grandsons "Billy McNamara" in this Cape Breton's Magazine article from 1988). David's sons and daughters married Proctor, Hayes, Cloake, Cogswell & Lamey children among others and many of them then moved over to Evanston and Lower River Inhabitants, though a number of them moved to the United States looking for employment. McNamara's Island remains uninhabited to this day.
