= Pine Tree, Nova Scotia =

Community in Nova Scotia, Canada

Coordinates: 45°36′01″N 62°32′40″W

Pine Tree in Nova Scotia

Pine Tree is a community in the Canadian province of Nova Scotia, located in Pictou County.
