= River Tillard, Nova Scotia =

Community in Nova Scotia, Canada

Coordinates: 45°38′58″N 60°55′08″W

River Tillard in Nova Scotia

River Tillard is a community in the Canadian province of Nova Scotia, located in Richmond County.
