= Thomson Station, Nova Scotia =

Community in Nova Scotia, Canada

Coordinates: 45°41′00″N 63°47′48″W

Thomson Station in Nova Scotia

Thomson Station is a community in the Canadian province of Nova Scotia, located in Cumberland County.
