= Sutherlands River =

Community in Nova Scotia, Canada

Coordinates: 45°35′16″N 62°29′54″W

Sutherland's River in Nova Scotia

Sutherlands River (Scottish Gaelic: Abhainn an t-Sutharlanaich) is a community in the Canadian province of Nova Scotia, located in Pictou County. This area received its name from a Scotchman named John Sutherland, who was a passenger on the Hector, and who settled near it in the year 1785.
