= Central West River, Nova Scotia =

Community in Nova Scotia, Canada

Coordinates: 45°34′37″N 62°50′38″W

Central West River in Nova Scotia

Central West River is a community in the Canadian province of Nova Scotia, located in Pictou County.
