= South River Road, Nova Scotia =

Community in Nova Scotia, Canada

Coordinates: 45°36′46″N 61°57′30″W

South River Road in Nova Scotia

South River Road is a community in the Canadian province of Nova Scotia, located in Antigonish County.
