= Addington Forks =

Community in Nova Scotia, Canada

Coordinates: 45°33′43.82″N 62°6′2.18″W

Addington Forks in Nova Scotia

Addington Forks is a community in the Canadian province of Nova Scotia, located in Antigonish County. It was named for Henry Addington, a British prime minister.

== People ==
- Iain mac Ailein, or John MacLean, a Scottish immigrant from Tiree highly important poet in both Scottish Gaelic literature and in the distinct Nova Scotia dialect of Canadian Gaelic, died at Addington Forks on January 26, 1848.
