= Lower South River =

Community in Nova Scotia, Canada

Coordinates: 45°35′47.63″N 61°54′23.09″W

Lower South River in Nova Scotia

Lower South River (Scottish Gaelic: Bun na h-Aibhne) is a community in the Canadian province of Nova Scotia, located in Antigonish County.

== Notable residents ==
- Garfield MacDonald, silver medalist at 1908 Olympics
