= Monastery, Nova Scotia =

Community in Nova Scotia, Canada

Coordinates: 45°36′12″N 61°36′58″W

Monastery in Nova Scotia

Monastery is a small community in the Canadian province of Nova Scotia, located in Antigonish County at the junction of Nova Scotia Trunk 16 and 4.

St. Augustine's Monastery was located in Monastery, replacing an earlier Trappist monastery. Our Lady of Grace Monastery, an Augustinian monastery, is now located in Monastery.

Monastery railway station was operated by Canadian National Railway Company and later by VIA Rail, but has not been served by passenger trains since 1990.\

== Notable natives and residents ==
- Charles Gaines, American writer
