= Frankville, Nova Scotia =

Community in Nova Scotia, Canada

Coordinates: 45.656127°N 61.525357°W

Frankville in Nova Scotia

Frankville is a small community in the Canadian province of Nova Scotia, located in Antigonish County, near Havre Boucher. It was originally known as the "Back Settlement of Harbour Bouche" until 1887 when the provincial government changed it to Frankville.

It is the home of Dennis Bonvie, former NHL player.
