= Union Centre, Nova Scotia =

Community in Nova Scotia, Canada

Coordinates: 45°31′52.91″N 62°45′11.28″W

Union Centre in Nova Scotia

Union Centre is an unincorporated community in the Canadian province of Nova Scotia, located in Pictou County.
