= Barneys River Station =

Community in Nova Scotia, Canada

Coordinates: 45°35′35″N 62°16′2″W

Barneys River Station in Nova Scotia

Barneys River Station is a community in the Canadian province of Nova Scotia, located in Pictou County.
