= Taylors Road, Nova Scotia =

Community in Nova Scotia, Canada

Coordinates: 45°36′38″N 61°52′36″W

Taylors Road in Nova Scotia

Taylors Road is a community in the Canadian province of Nova Scotia, located in Antigonish County.
