= Kenzieville, Nova Scotia =

Community in Nova Scotia, Canada

Coordinates: 45°34′57″N 62°18′22″W

Kenzieville in Nova Scotia

Kenzieville is a community in the Canadian province of Nova Scotia, located in Pictou County.
