= Salt Springs, Pictou County =

Community in Nova Scotia, Canada

Coordinates: 45°32′8.61″N 62°53′45.91″W

Salt Springs in Nova Scotia

Salt Springs is a small community in the Canadian province of Nova Scotia, located in Pictou County.

== Geography ==
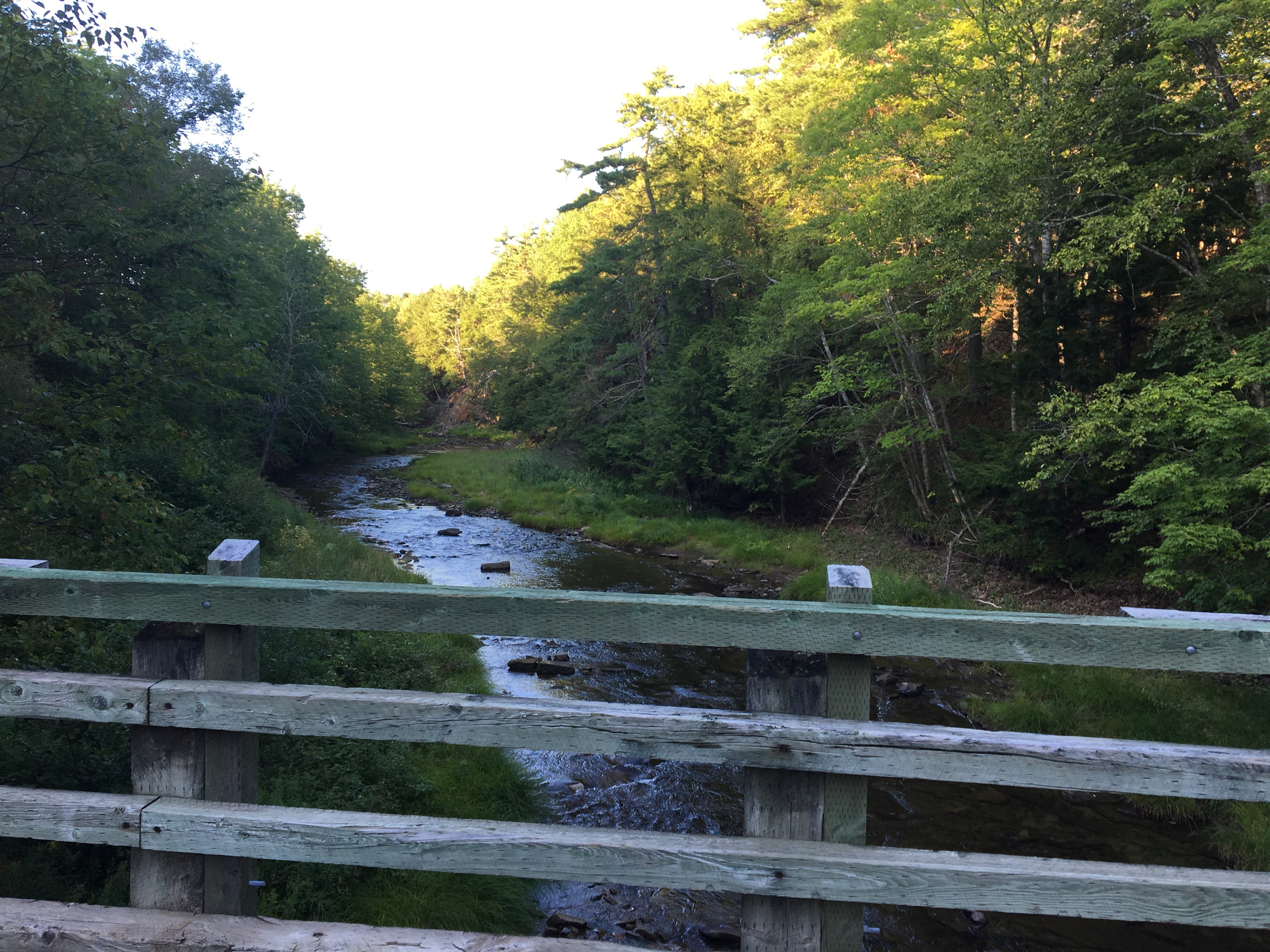
The West River flows through Salt Springs Provincial Park

The community shares a valley with the upper reaches of the West River (of Pictou), with the surrounding mountains being the eastern extension of the Cobequid Hills. The community is directly east of Mount Thom and is named after saline springs which bubble up from the foot of the mountain.

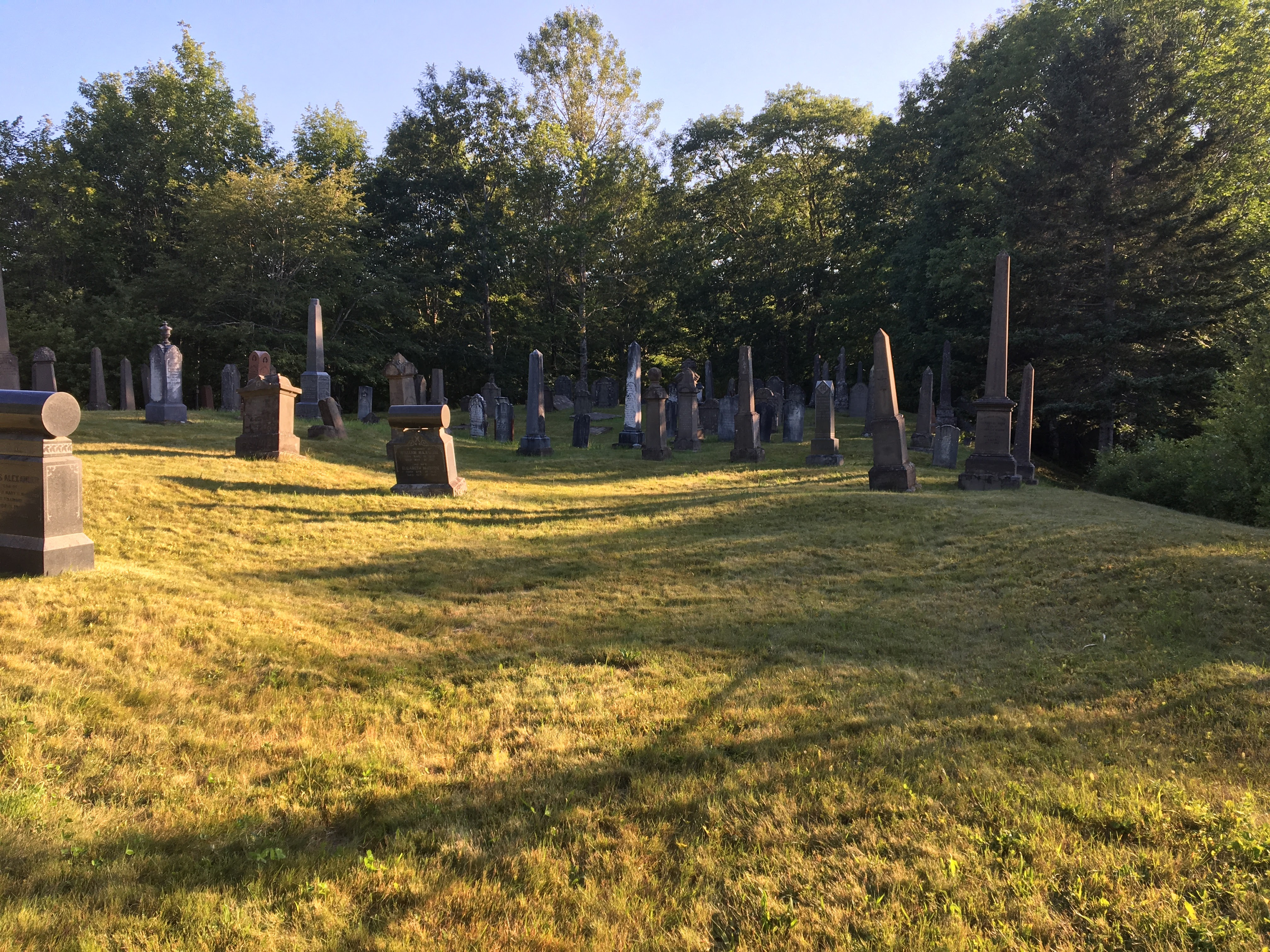
Caledonia Cemetery inside the Salt Springs Provincial Park

Salt Springs Provincial Park is located along the West River in the community. The park includes camping areas, forested trails, and a pioneer cemetery.

== History ==
Pictou County and much of northeastern Nova Scotia came to be settled by Scottish immigrants fleeing the Highland Clearances during the late 18th century and into the early 19th century. Numerous small family farms were established after clearing the abundant first-growth Acadian Forest.

The Salt Springs area was settled by the 1770s by passengers from the Ship Hector and a property referred to as the "Salt Springs Lot" was settled by the early 19th century. Attempts were made in 1813 and 1823 to recover some of the salt from the springs. In 1822, the community, led by Ebenezer McLeod, petitioned to the government for the establishment of a bridge to cross the West River.

The community became home to a Presbyterian church in 1822 (St. Luke's) and a seceding group which formed under the Free Church of Scotland in 1845-1846 (Ebenezer). The St. Luke's and Ebenezer congregations reunited in 1908 (under St. Luke's) and part of the congregation merged into the United Church of Canada in 1929.

Industrialization came in 1825 when a clothing or fulling mill was established in 1825 at the confluence of Six and Eight Mile Brooks. A carding machine was subsequently established at Salt Springs by 1832. A woolen mill was established over the location of the fulling mill by 1879.

Salt Springs was on the stage coach route from Pictou to Halifax and a hotel named Twelve Mile House was built in 1838. This was renamed Prince of Wales Hotel after the Prince of Wales (HRH Prince Albert) stayed on a brief visit through the area in 1860 and it closed around 1900. A post office was established in 1864 and Salt Springs became home to a school in 1909 when a replacement to the Six Mile Brook school, which had been lost to fire, was built in the community.

The population of the community in 1956 was 75. In the early 1960s, the Trans-Canada Highway (Highway 104) was built through the community, causing outmigration. Today's population is roughly 171 inhabitants, most of whom commute to work in nearby centres of Pictou, New Glasgow and industrial Pictou County, or west to Truro.
