= Kemptown, Nova Scotia =

Community in Nova Scotia, Canada

Kemptown in Nova Scotia

Kemptown is an unincorporated community in the Canadian province of Nova Scotia, located in Colchester County. The area that became Kemptown was included in the Philadelphia grant of 1765.
