= Thorburn, Nova Scotia =

Community in Nova Scotia, Canada

Coordinates: 45°33′54″N 62°32′51″W

Thorburn in Nova Scotia

Thorburn is a community in the Canadian province of Nova Scotia, located in Pictou County.

== Description ==
This small rural Nova Scotia town has a hair salon, sports arena, a school (Thorburn Consolidated School), a few churches and a fire hall. It is home to several farms and is also the hometown of actor Mike Smith, who plays the character Bubbles on the Canadian television show Trailer Park Boys, and Aaron Cameron who appeared in the Citytv series Seed. The community is about 10 minutes from the town of New Glasgow, Nova Scotia.
