= List of communities in Colchester County, Nova Scotia =

List of communities in Colchester County, Nova Scotia.

Communities are ordered by the highway on which they are located, whose routes start after each terminus near the largest community.

== Trunk routes ==
- Trunk 2: Stewiacke - Alton – Brentwood - Brookfield - Hilden – Truro - Onslow - Masstown - Glenholme - Little Dyke - Great Village - Highland Village - Portapique - Five Houses - Bass River - Upper Economy - Cove Road - Economy – Carrs Brook - Lower Economy - Five Islands
- Trunk 4: Folly Lake – Masstown – Onslow – Truro – Bible Hill - Kemptown
- Trunk 6: Bayhead - Tatamagouche - Brule

== Arterial highway ==
- Highway 102: Truro Heights, Lower Truro

== Collector roads ==
- Route 224: Gays River
- Route 236: Green Oaks - Beaver Brook - Old Barns – Truro Heights
- Route 246: Tatamagouche - Oliver - West New Annan
- Route 256: West New Annan - Central New Annan - The Falls - Balmoral Mills - East Earltown
- Route 289: Green Oaks - Green Creek – Brookfield - Earltown - Otter Brook - Upper Stewiacke – Eastville
- Route 311: Bible Hill - North River - Nuttby - Earltown
- Route 326: Earltown - North Earltown – East Earltown - Denmark – Brule
- Route 336: Newton Mills – Eastville

== Rural roads ==
- Acadian Mines
- Belmont
- Black Rock
- Burnside
- Camden
- Castlereagh
- Cloverdale
- Coldstream
- Debert
- East Mines Station
- East Stewiacke
- East Village
- French River
- Greenfield
- Harmony
- Lanesville
- Little Dyke
- Londonderry
- Lornevale
- Lynn
- McCallum Settlement
- Montrose
- Pleasant Hills
- Princeport
- Riversdale
- Salmon River
- Sand Point
- South Branch
- Union
- Valley
- West St. Andrews
- Wittenburg
