= West St. Andrews =

Community in Nova Scotia, Canada

Coordinates: 45°5′48.45″N 63°18′2.95″W

West St. Andrews in Nova Scotia

West St. Andrews (formerly Milltown) is an unincorporated community in the Canadian province of Nova Scotia, located in Colchester County. West St. Andrews is adjacent to the communities of East Stewiacke, Wittenburg, Coldstream, Lanesville, and the Town of Stewiacke.
