= East Stewiacke =

Community in Nova Scotia, Canada

Coordinates: 45°8′38″N 63°17′49″W

East Stewiacke in Nova Scotia

East Stewiacke is a community in the Canadian province of Nova Scotia, located in Colchester County. It is mainly a farming and rural bedroom community, neighboured by the communities of Mackay Siding, West St. Andrews, Alton and the Town of Stewiacke.

East Stewiacke is home to the Stewiacke River Park, which is located on the Stewiacke River.
