= Nova Scotia Route 326 =

Highway in Nova Scotia, Canada

Route 326

Route information
- Maintained by Nova Scotia Department of Transportation and Infrastructure Renewal
- Length: 19 km (12 mi)

Major junctions
- South end: Route 311 in Earltown
- Route 256 in MacBains Corner & East Earltown
- North end: Trunk 6 in Brule Corner

Location
- Country: Canada
- Province: Nova Scotia
- Counties: Colchester

Highway system
- Provincial highways in Nova Scotia; 100-series
← Route 325	→ Route 327

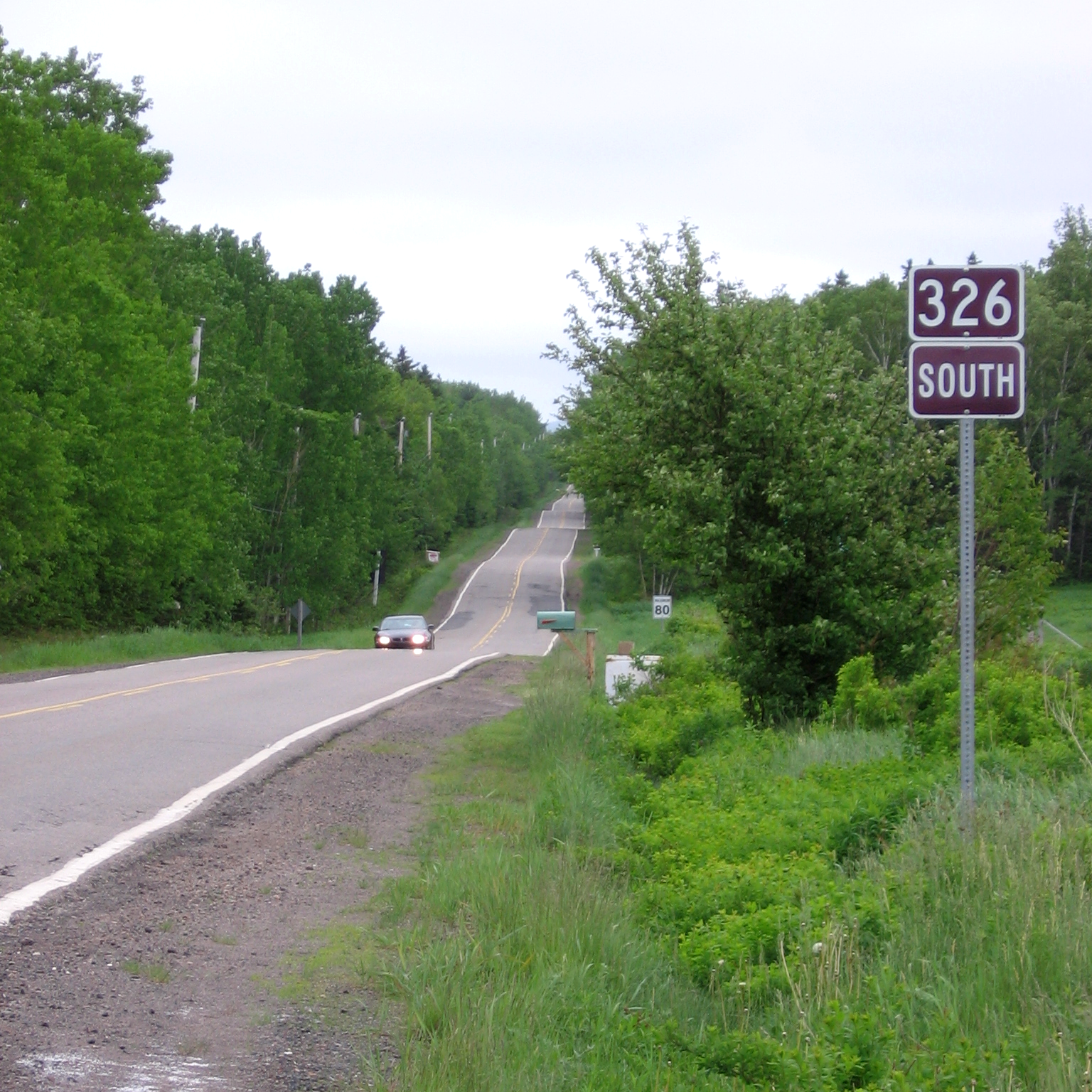
Route 326 at Brule Corner near the junction with Trunk 6.

Route 326 is a collector road in the Canadian province of Nova Scotia. It is located in Colchester County and connects Brule at Trunk 6 with Earltown at Route 311.

== Communities ==
- Earltown
- MacBains Corner
- East Earltown
- Denmark
- Middleton Corner
- Keble
- Brule Corner

== See also ==
- List of Nova Scotia provincial highways
