= Fort Ellis (Nova Scotia) =

British fort in the French and Indian War

Coordinates: 45.149°N 63.383°W

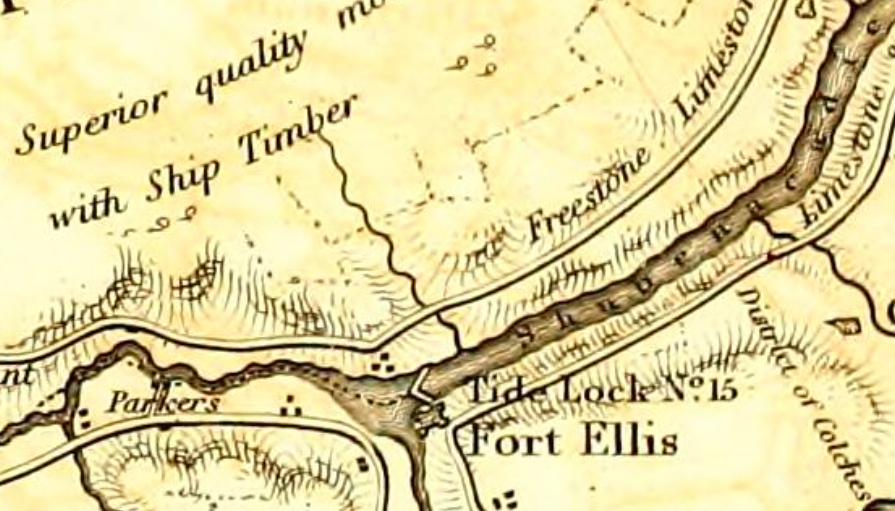
Fort Ellis, Nova Scotia

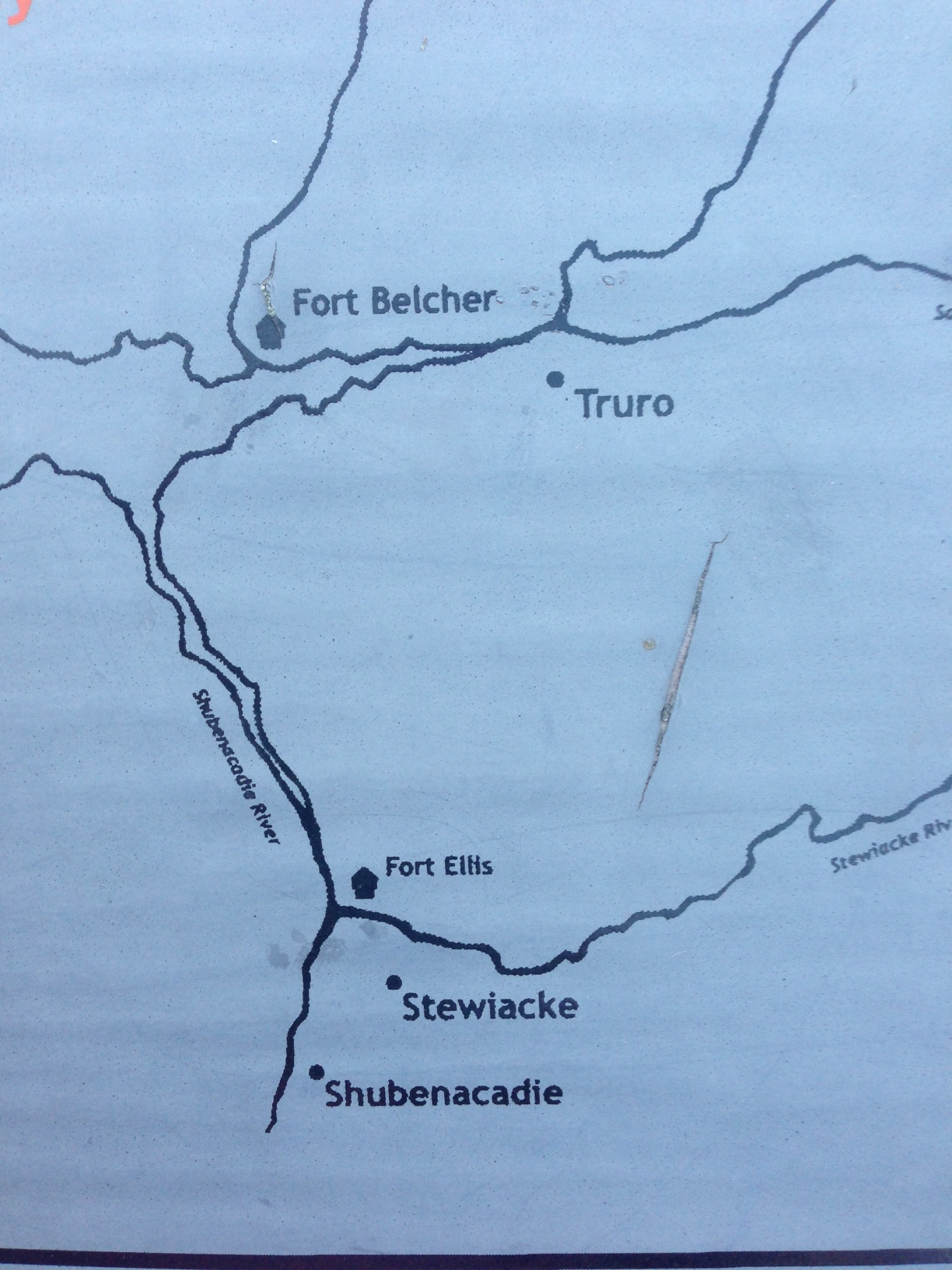
Fort Ellis and Fort Belcher, Nova Scotia

Fort Ellis was a British fort or blockhouse built during the French and Indian War, located at the junction of the Shubenacadie and Stewiacke Rivers, close to Stewiacke, Nova Scotia, Canada. The location was labelled Ville Pierre Hebert by Charles Morris. The 14 Acadian families in the area vacated with the Acadian Exodus. Charles Morris recommended a Fort on the Shubenacadie River in 1753. Governor Lawrence first considered the fort in 1754 as a means to protect Halifax from Mi'kmaq raids. Lawrence decided the fort would not be effective until after the Battle of Fort Beauséjour. The fort was completed on October 18, 1761, shortly after the Halifax Treaties were signed. The fort was to guard the new road built to connect Truro and Halifax against Mi'kmaq raids. The fort was called Fort Ellis after Governor Henry Ellis, who was appointed governor weeks after the forts completion. The fort was never garrisoned and eventually abandoned in 1767. Fort Belcher, named after Governor Jonathan Belcher, was built on Salmon River in Lower Onslow, Nova Scotia (1761–67). Fort Franklin was built at Tatamagouche in 1768, named after Michael Francklin and lasted only a year. Fort Morris (Nova Scotia) was named after Charles Morris.

== Legacy ==
- Fort Ellis Road, Shortts Lake, Nova Scotia

== See also ==
- Military history of Nova Scotia
