= Nova Scotia Route 336 =

Highway in Nova Scotia, Canada

Route 336

Route information
- Maintained by Nova Scotia Department of Transportation and Infrastructure Renewal
- Length: 23 km (14 mi)

Major junctions
- South end: Route 224 in Upper Musquodoboit
- North end: Route 289 in Springside

Location
- Country: Canada
- Province: Nova Scotia
- Counties: Halifax Regional Municipality, Colchester

Highway system
- Provincial highways in Nova Scotia; 100-series
← Route 335	→ Route 337

Route 336 is a collector road in the Canadian province of Nova Scotia.

It is located in the central part of the province and connects Upper Musquodoboit at Route 224 with Springside at Route 289.

== Communities ==
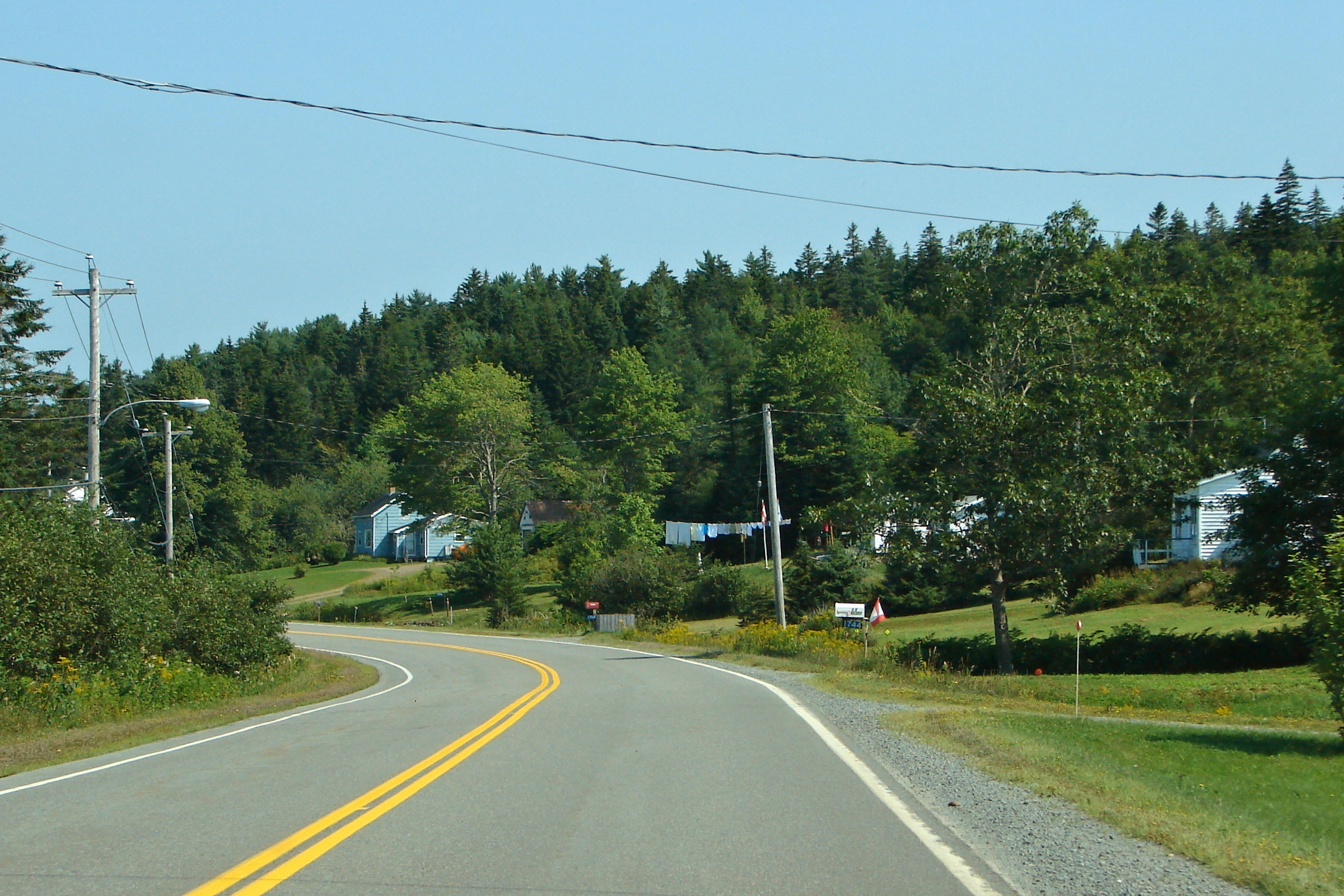
Route 336 at Dean

- Upper Musquodoboit
- Dean
- Newton Mills
- Eastville
- Springside

== See also ==
- List of Nova Scotia provincial highways
