= Nova Scotia Route 246 =

Highway in Nova Scotia, Canada

Route 246

Route information
- Maintained by Nova Scotia Department of Transportation and Infrastructure Renewal
- Length: 25 km (16 mi)

Major junctions
- West end: Trunk 4 in Wentworth
- Route 256 in West New Annan
- East end: Trunk 6 in Tatamagouche

Location
- Country: Canada
- Province: Nova Scotia
- Counties: Cumberland Colchester

Highway system
- Provincial highways in Nova Scotia; 100-series
← Route 245	→ Route 247

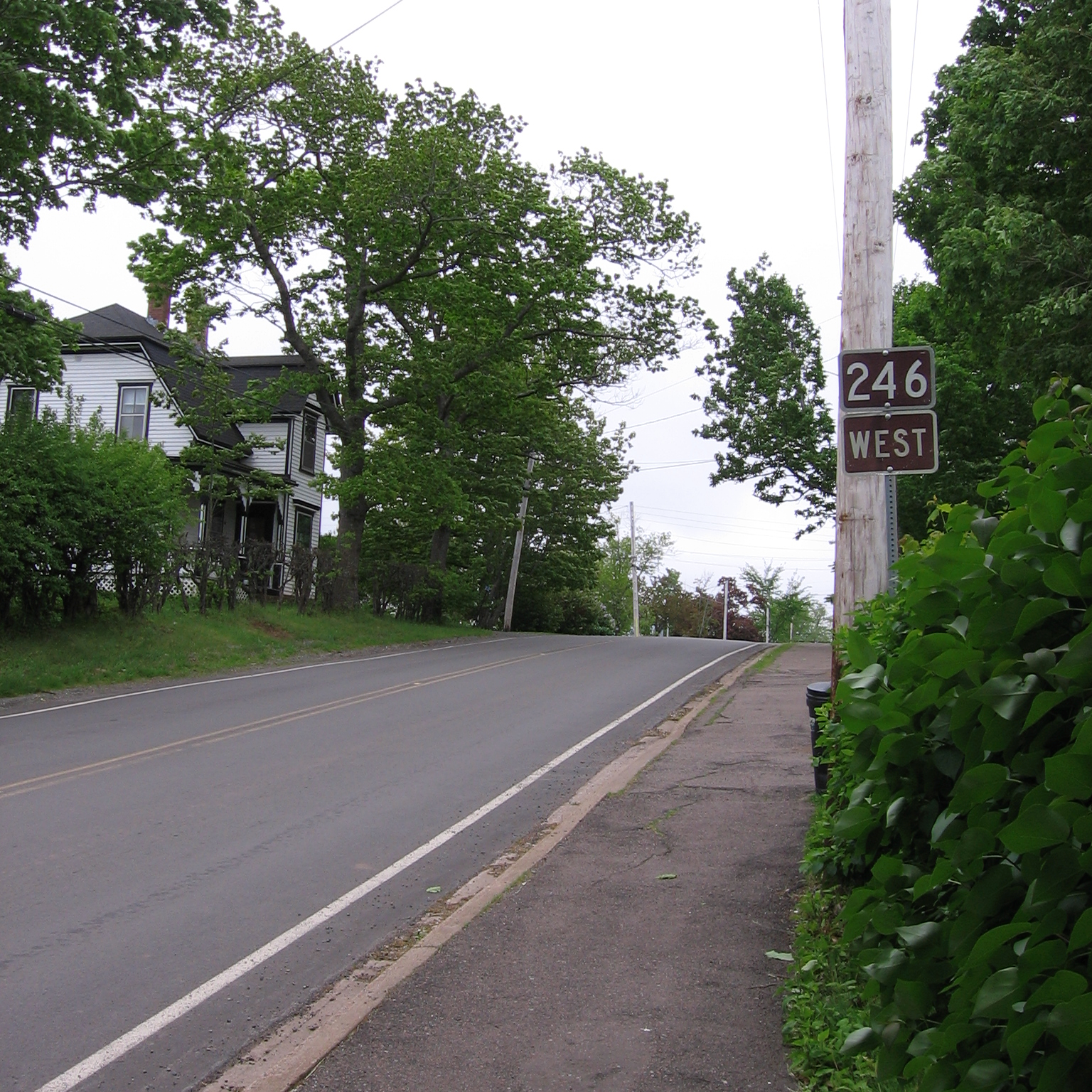
NS Route 246 in Tatamagouche, Nova Scotia

Route 246 is a collector road in the Canadian province of Nova Scotia.

It is located in the northern part of the province and connects Tatamagouche at Trunk 6 with Wentworth, Nova Scotia at Trunk 4.

== Communities ==
Route 246 passes through the communities of Wentworth, West New Annan, Oliver and Tatamagouche. It crosses the French River at Oliver.

== See also ==
- List of Nova Scotia provincial highways
