= South Branch, Nova Scotia =

Community in Nova Scotia, Canada

Coordinates: 45°10′11.33″N 63°5′8″W

South Branch in Nova Scotia

South Branch is an unincorporated community in the Canadian province of Nova Scotia, located in Colchester County. The community is named for the south branch of the Stewiacke River.
