= Dean, Nova Scotia =

Community in Nova Scotia, Canada

Coordinates: 45°11′42″N 62°53′18″W

Dean in Nova Scotia

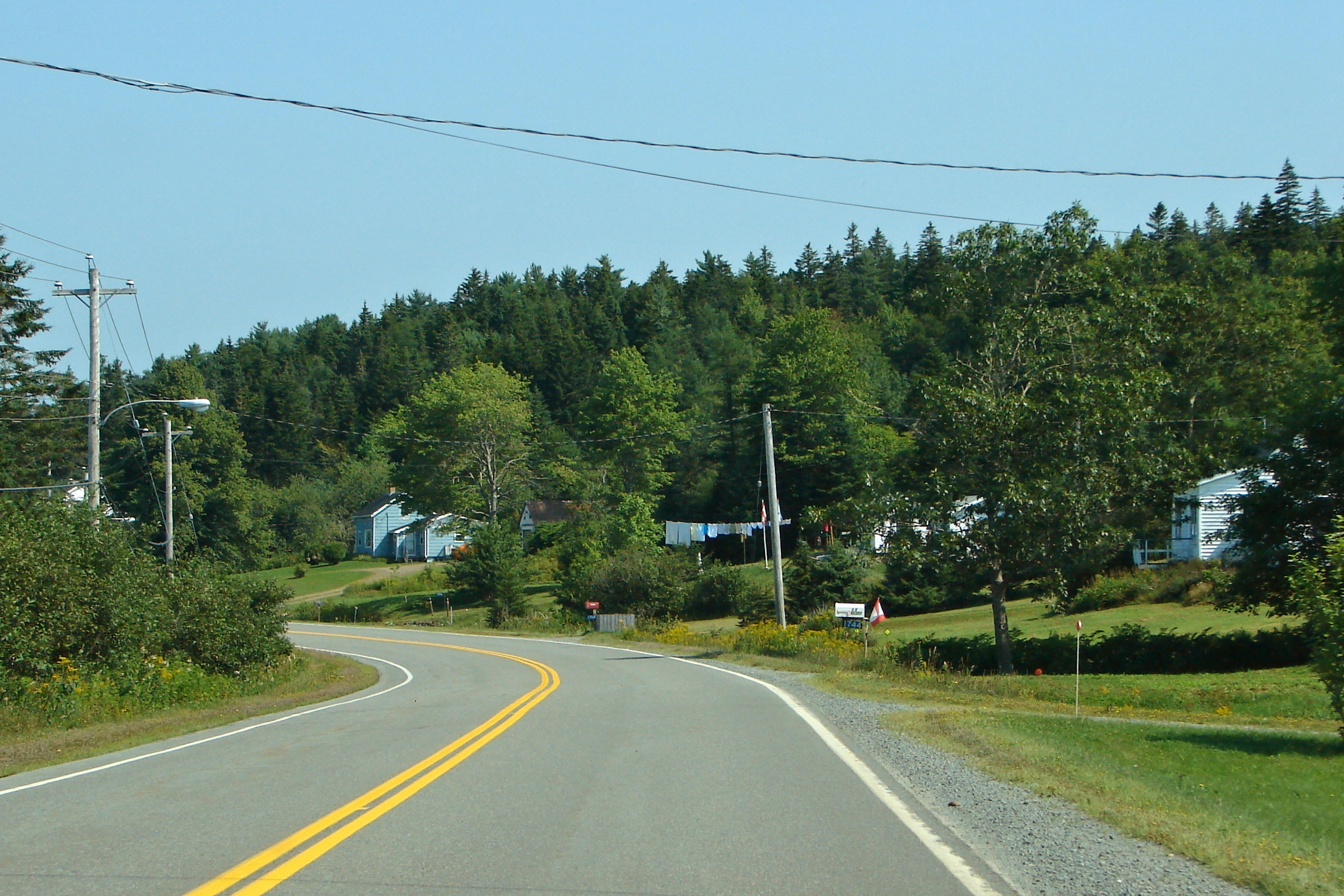
Dean

Dean is a small community in the North Branch Musquodoboit in the Musquodoboit Valley along the Halifax Regional Municipality/Colchester County county line, in the Canadian province of Nova Scotia, along Route 336. Other communities in the North Branch include Elmsvale, Greenwood, Upper Musquodoboit, and Moose River Gold Mines, among others.

== Transportation ==
Route 336 runs north–south through Dean. The only other major road in the community is Woodside Rd, which leads to Trafalgar, in neighboring Guysborough County. There are other minor gravel/dirt roads in Dean.

== Communications ==
- Telephone exchange 902 - 568
- Postal code - B0N 2M0
