= Bayhead (disambiguation) =

Bayhead may refer to:

- Bayhead, a swamp habitat
- Bayhead, Nova Scotia, a community in Canada

== See also ==
- Bay Head, New Jersey, a borough in the United States
