= Stewiacke Valley =

Valley in Nova Scotia, Canada

Coordinates: 45°13′N 63°10′W

The Stewiacke Valley is a Canadian rural region in central Nova Scotia running from western Pictou County through southern Colchester County to the Shubenacadie River.

The Stewiacke River flows through the length of the valley. The economy is primarily farming and lumbering. Nova Scotia Route 289 is the primary road running through the valley.

== Communities ==
- Stewiacke
- Upper Stewiacke
- Middle Stewiacke
- Brookfield
- Upper Brookfield
- Pleasant Valley
- Green Creek
- Green Oaks
- Sheepherders Junction
- Forest Glen
- Brentwood
- Cloverdale
