= Sand Point, Colchester County =

Community in Nova Scotia, Canada

Coordinates: 45°44′15″N 63°17′2″W

Sand Point in Nova Scotia

Sand Point is an unincorporated community in the Canadian province of Nova Scotia, located in Colchester County. The community is adjacent to Tatamagouche.
