= Nova Scotia Route 311 =

Highway in Nova Scotia, Canada

Route 311

Route information
- Maintained by Nova Scotia Department of Transportation and Infrastructure Renewal
- Length: 49 km (30 mi)

Major junctions
- South end: Trunk 4 in Truro
- Route 326 in Earltown; Route 256 in The Falls
- North end: Trunk 6 in Tatamagouche

Location
- Country: Canada
- Province: Nova Scotia
- Counties: Colchester

Highway system
- Provincial highways in Nova Scotia; 100-series
← Route 309	→ Route 312

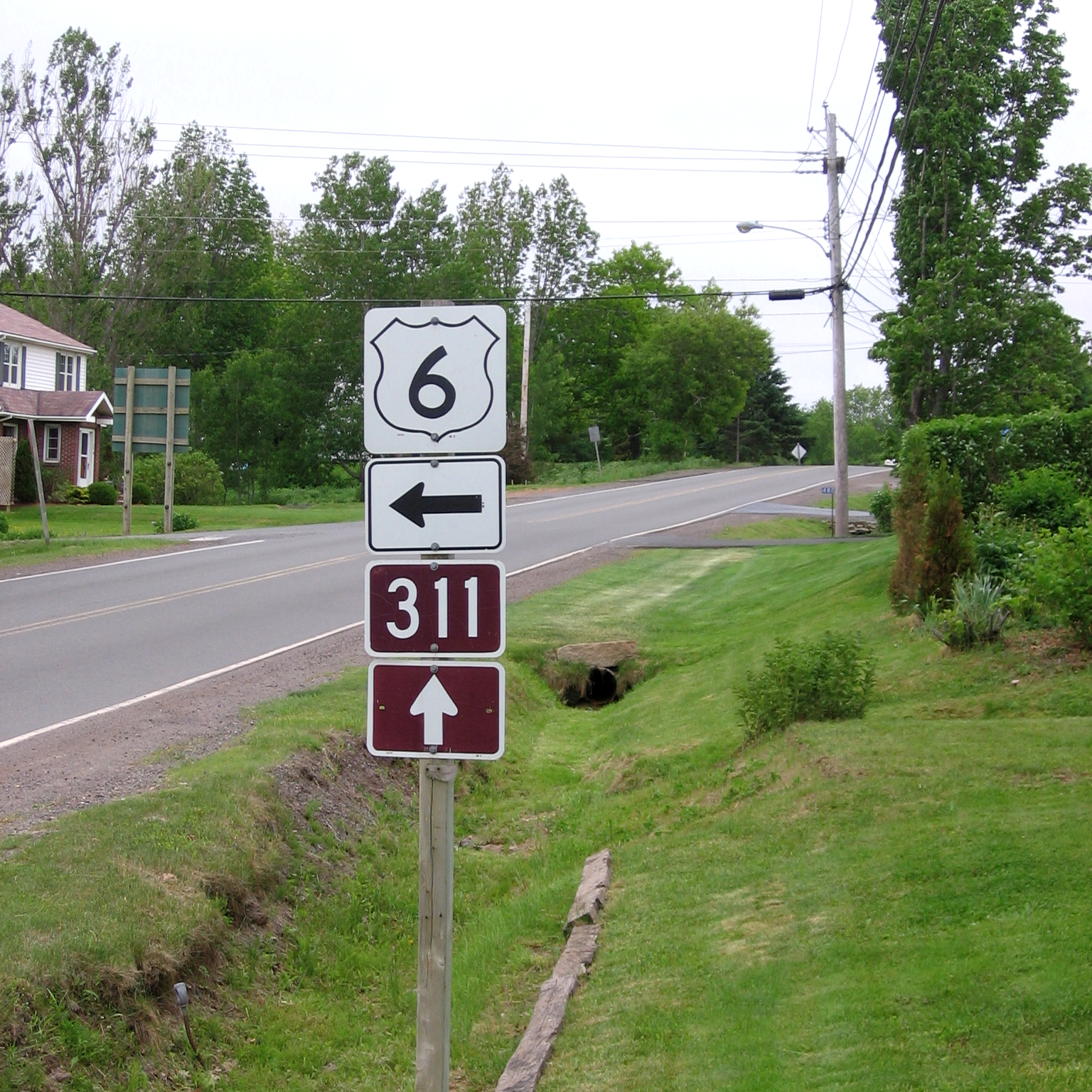
Start of Route 311 in Tatamagouche, Nova Scotia

Route 311 is a collector road in the Canadian province of Nova Scotia.

It is located in Colchester County and connects Tatamagouche at Trunk 6 with Truro at Trunk 4.

== Communities ==
- Truro
- Upper Onslow
- North River
- Central North River
- Upper North River
- Nuttby
- Earltown
- West Earltown
- The Falls
- Balfron
- Waugh River
- Tatamagouche

== History ==
The entirety of Collector Highway 311 was once designated as Trunk Highway 11.

== See also ==
- List of Nova Scotia provincial highways
