= Sheepherders Junction =

Community in Nova Scotia, Canada

Coordinates: 45°22′4.61″N 62°50′26.76″W

Sheepherders Junction in Nova Scotia

Sheepherders Junction is a locality in the Canadian province of Nova Scotia, located in Colchester County in the Stewiacke Valley.

It is located at the border between Colchester County and Pictou County, Nova Scotia at the intersection of Dryden Lake Road with Route 289. Nearby on Fall Brook, a tributary of the Stewiake River, is the 12 m Fall Brook Fall.
