= Otter Brook =

Otter Brook may refer to:

- Otter Brook, Nova Scotia, Canada, a community
- Otter Brook (Ashuelot River tributary), New Hampshire, United States, a river
