= Riversdale, Colchester County =

Community in Nova Scotia, Canada

Coordinates: 45°25′22.92″N 63°2′49.57″W

Riversdale in Nova Scotia

Riversdale is an unincorporated community in the Canadian province of Nova Scotia, located in Colchester County.
