= Montrose, Nova Scotia =

Community in Nova Scotia, Canada

Coordinates: 45°25′25.96″N 63°42′5.32″W

Montrose in Nova Scotia

Montrose (Scottish Gaelic: Mon Rois) is an unincorporated community in the Canadian province of Nova Scotia, located in Colchester County.
