= Little Dyke =

Community in Nova Scotia, Canada

Coordinates: 45°23′2.12″N 63°33′26.68″W

Little Dyke in Nova Scotia

Little Dyke is an unincorporated community in the Canadian province of Nova Scotia, located in Colchester County. The community was presumably named for an early dyke on the marshland in the area, and the name dates back to at least 1828.
