= Upper Onslow, Nova Scotia =

Community in Nova Scotia, Canada

Coordinates: 45.392°N 63.291°W

Upper Onslow in Nova Scotia

Upper Onslow is a community in the Canadian province of Nova Scotia, located in Colchester County.
