= Tatamagouche Centre =

Coordinates: 45.720213°N 63.300759°W

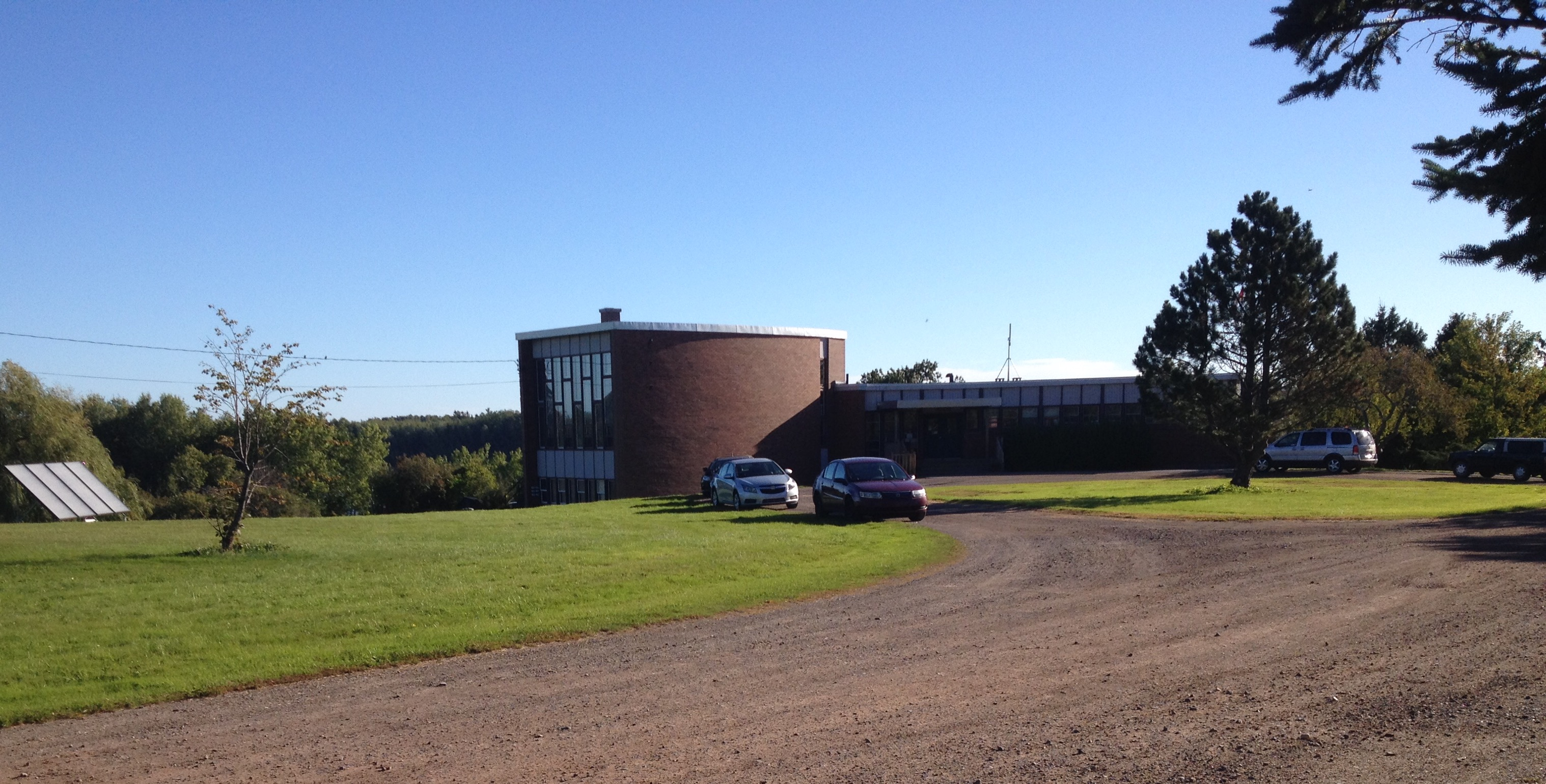
The Tatamagouche Centre

Tatamagouche Centre is a non-profit educational, conference and retreat centre located in the village of Tatamagouche, Nova Scotia. Tatamagouche Centre holds international recognition for its adult education and facilitation training and programming. Tatamagouche Centre is a registered charity and one of four education and retreat centres of the United Church of Canada. It is operated under the direction of a volunteer board (community council). Tatamagouche Centre has approximately twenty staff.

== History ==
Tatamagouche Centre is located near Tatamagouche Bay, at the junction of the French and Waugh Rivers and beside the Trans Canada Trail. The area is connected to both the Mi'kmaq First Nations and the Acadians. Tatamagouche Centre has served as a meeting space to discuss such topics as spirituality, leadership, and social justice. The Centre held winter sessions in the 1950s and 1960s. In the 1960s it concentrated more on human relations. More recently it has undertaken partnerships with First Nations Communities and organizations such as the Guatemala Breaking the Silence Network.

== Services Offered ==
There are approximately 60 programs offered each year at Tatamagouche Centre. Programs are offered concerning themes surrounding social justice, arts, music and creativity, faith and spirit, leadership development and youth and family. Personal and group retreats are also available. Tatamagouche Centre also offers space for meetings, conferences and special events.

== Lodging ==
The Centre has six residences, allowing accommodation of 65 guests. The six residences include Andrew House, Campbell House, Creighton House, Reid House, Saswasig Lodge and Stevens House. Several residences are wheelchair accessible.

== Partnerships ==
Tatamagouche Centre works with several organizations, including the Atlantic Jubilee Program, Breaking the Silence Guatemala, Atlantic Regional Solidarity Network, Common Life Community, Aboriginal Peace and Friendship, and Black Leadership Advisory Committee.
