= McCallum Settlement =

Community in Nova Scotia, Canada

- Location in Nova Scotia
- Coordinates: 45°29′50″N 63°15′40″W
- Country: Canada
- Province: Nova Scotia
- County: Colchester County
- Time zone: UTC-4 (AST)
  - Summer (DST): UTC-3 (ADT)
- Postal code range: B6L 6B6, 6B7, 6V3-6V6

McCallum Settlement is an unincorporated community in the Canadian province of Nova Scotia, located in Colchester County.
