= Oliver, Nova Scotia =

Community in Nova Scotia, Canada

Coordinates: 45°39′15.51″N 63°18′49.92″W

Oliver in Nova Scotia

Oliver is an unincorporated community in the Canadian province of Nova Scotia, located in Colchester County on Nova Scotia Route 246. It is in the valley of the French River and surrounded by the communities of Tatamagouche, New Truro Road, Central New Annan, West New Annan, Millbrook and French River.
