= Manganese Mines =

Community in Nova Scotia, Canada

Coordinates: 45°24′46″N 63°9′46″W

Manganese Mines is an unincorporated community in Colchester County, Nova Scotia, Canada.

This community is located about six miles north-east of Truro, between the South Branch North River and the Salmon River. The land was previously part of Onslow Township. It was settled by immigrants from New Hampshire and Massachusetts who first went to Truro and to the present location of Onslow, probably around 1761.

This community includes Gittens Lodge, an environmental science centre formerly operated by Nova Scotia Teachers College and now operated by the Truro campus of Nova Scotia Community College. It also includes the Manganese Mines Wildlife Management Area, a conservation area.

The main industry is now farming.

== Mining ==
The name of this community derives from the discovery and mining of manganese here, beginning in the 1880s and ending in the 1890s. Also, Lafarge Canada operated a limestone quarry at Manganese Mines which closed in 1996. The limestone was used to produce cement.
