= Lynn, Nova Scotia =

Community in Nova Scotia, Canada

Coordinates: 45°28′21.54″N 64°6′26.22″W

Lynn in Nova Scotia

Lynn is an unincorporated community in the Canadian province of Nova Scotia, located in Colchester County.
