= Brule, Nova Scotia =

Community in Nova Scotia, Canada

Coordinates: 45°42′26.1″N 63°1′39.8″W

Brule in Nova Scotia

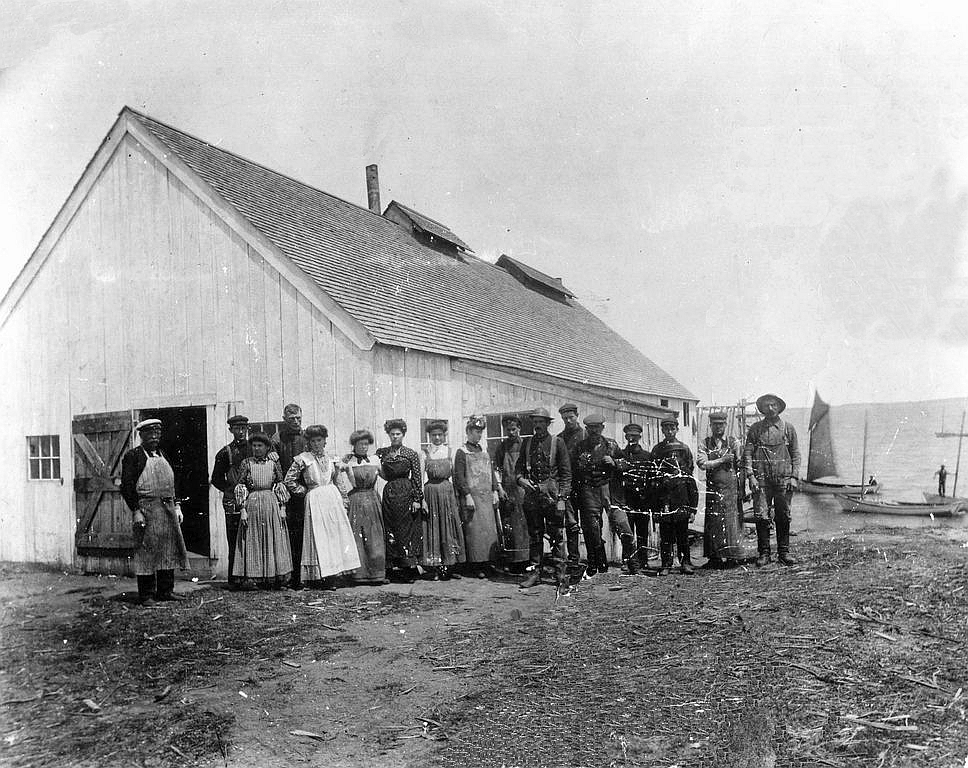
John Myers Cannery in Brule Point, 1906

Brule (English: /bruːl/) is a rural community located in Colchester County, Nova Scotia, Canada.

Located on Amet Sound an embayment of the Northumberland Strait 6 kilometres east of the village of Tatamagouche near the county boundary, the community is situated on the southern shore of Brule Harbour opposite Brule Point.

== Fossils ==
Brule was the site of numerous fossil discoveries dating to 290 mya, in the Early Permian Period. Examples of these finds are now housed at the Creamery Square Heritage Centre in nearby Tatamagouche.

The Brule fossil forest is composed of the ancient tree species: Walchia sp. The forest contains fallen logs, as well as about 90 in-situ-(standing) tree trunks, and leaflets or branch fossils. The 'Brule Forest' is the only example of standing trees, or in-situ tree-trunks of Walchia. Four-footed, tetrapod animal fossil trackways are also found in the fossil rich rocks.

== See also ==
- Walchia
- Mistaken Point, older fossils in Newfoundland and Labrador
