= Fraser Octagon House =

Historic house in Nova Scotia, Canada

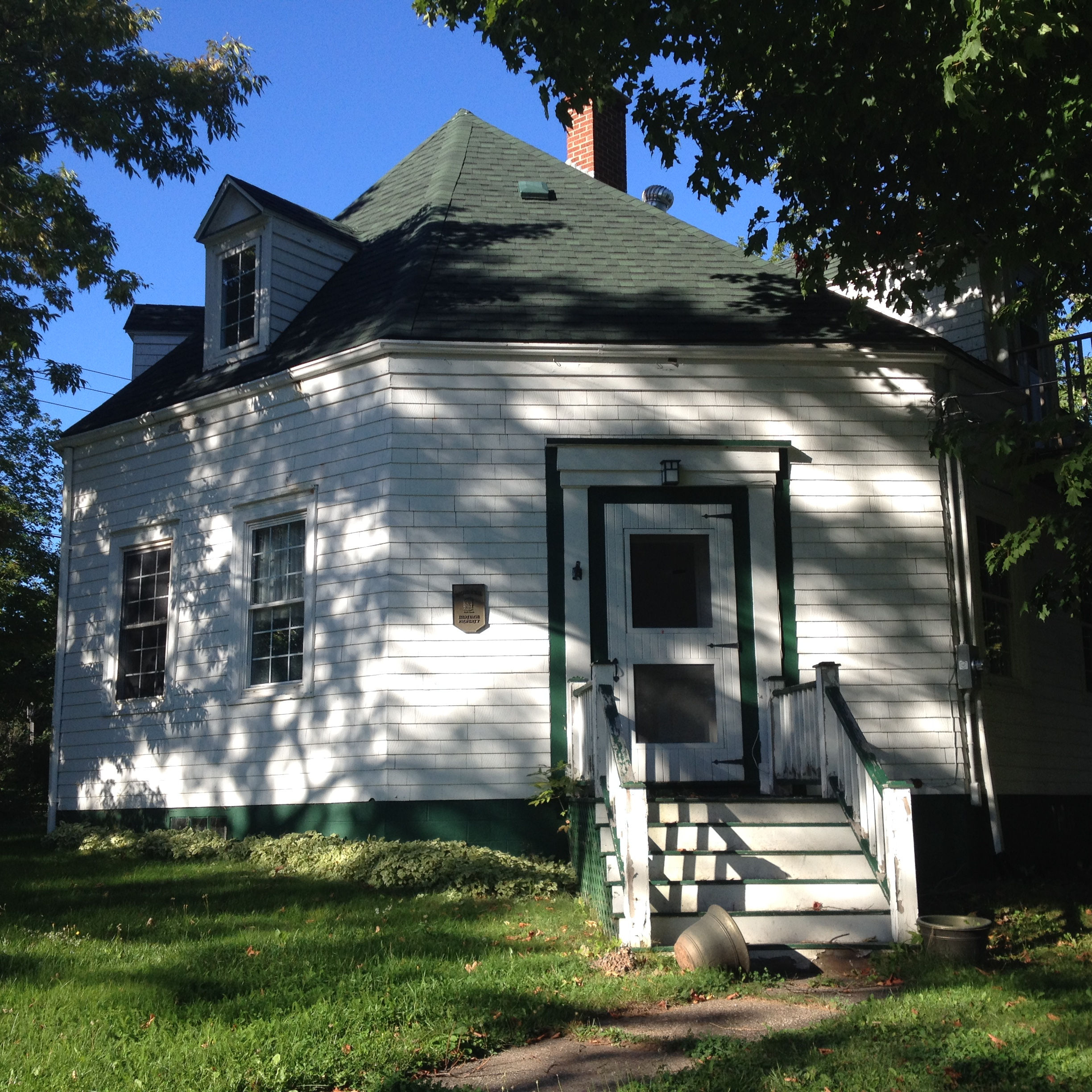
- Interactive map of the Fraser Octagon House area

General information
- Architectural style: Octagon Mode
- Location: 63 Church Street, Tatamagouche, Nova Scotia, Canada
- Coordinates: 45.712602°N 63.294183°W
- Construction started: 1857
- Completed: 1857

Nova Scotia Heritage Property Act
- Type: Provincially Registered Property
- Designated: 1993-03-31
- Reference no.: 00PNS0171

Fraser Octagon House is an historic octagon house located in Tatamagouche, Nova Scotia, Canada. It was built in 1857 and is one and a half storeys.

It features "Greek Revival pilasters and entablature at the front entrance"; "a wood frame shed"; and "prominent location on a corner lot".

It was recognized as a Nova Scotia Provincially Recognized Site under the Heritage Property Act on 31 March 1993.

== See also ==
- List of octagon houses
