= Millbrook 27 =

Mi'kmaq reserve in Nova Scotia, Canada

Coordinates: 45°19′39.11″N 63°17′27.11″W

Millbrook 27 in Nova Scotia

Millbrook 27 is a Mi'kmaq reserve located in Colchester County, Nova Scotia.

It is administratively part of the Millbrook First Nation.
