= Cloverdale, Nova Scotia =

Community in Nova Scotia, Canada

Coordinates: 45°10′44.01″N 63°13′2.61″W

Cloverdale in Nova Scotia

Cloverdale is an unincorporated community in the Canadian province of Nova Scotia, located in Colchester County in the Stewiacke Valley.
