= North Earltown =

Community in Nova Scotia, Canada

Coordinates: 45°37′7.72″N 63°8′12.93″W

North Earltown in Nova Scotia

North Earltown is a community in the Canadian province of Nova Scotia, located in Colchester County.
