= Central New Annan =

Community in Nova Scotia, Canada

Coordinates: 45°38′0.44″N 63°19′1.19″W

Central New Annan in Nova Scotia

Central New Annan (Scottish Gaelic: Anainn Ùr) is a community in the Canadian province of Nova Scotia, located in Colchester County.
