= Middle Stewiacke =

Community in Nova Scotia, Canada

Coordinates: 45°12′41.59″N 63°7′21.49″W

Middle Stewiacke in Nova Scotia

Middle Stewiacke is a small community in the Canadian province of Nova Scotia, located in Colchester County in the Stewiacke Valley.
