= Lower Onslow =

Community in Nova Scotia, Canada

Coordinates: 45°22′56.27″N 63°24′14.36″W

Lower Onslow in Nova Scotia

Lower Onslow is a small community in the Canadian province of Nova Scotia, located in Colchester County.

== See also ==
- Onslow, Nova Scotia
