= The Falls, Nova Scotia =

Community in Nova Scotia, Canada

Coordinates: 45°38′18″N 63°13′3.7″W

The Falls in Nova Scotia

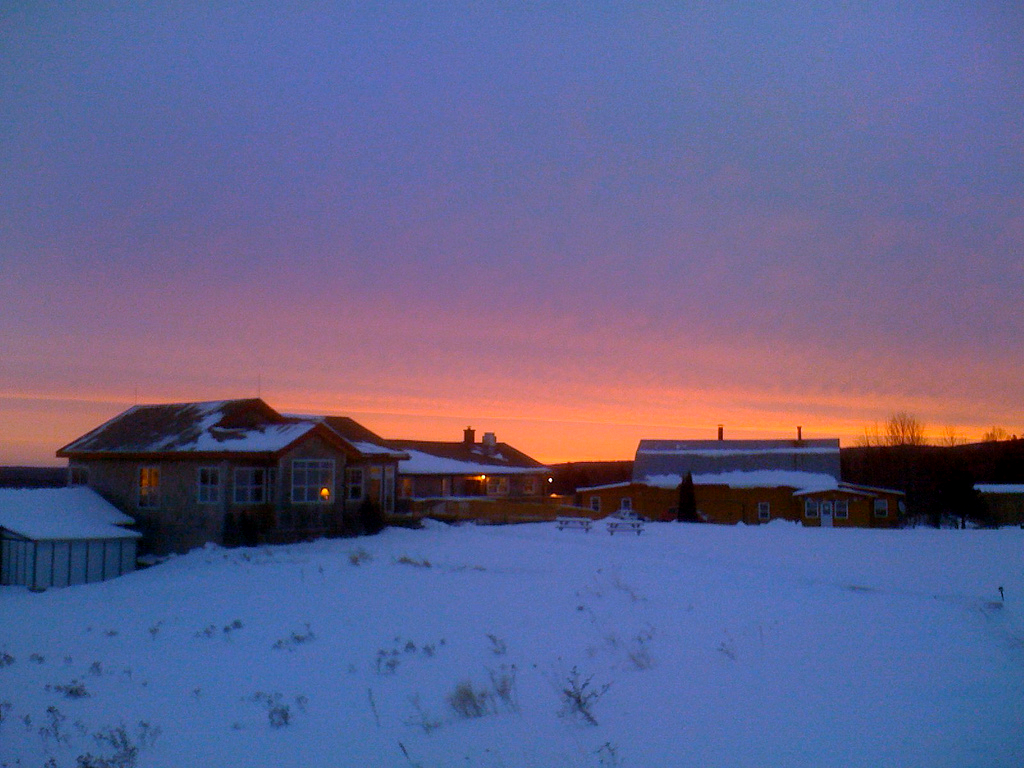
Dorje Denma Ling retreat centre in The Falls near Tatamagouche.

The Falls is a community of about 100 people located in the northern part of Colchester County, Nova Scotia, Canada.

It is located six miles south of the village of Tatamagouche on Route 311 which leads to Truro, the county seat.

Early records refer to the settlement as Tatamagouche River. The first permanent settlers were Highland Scots from the Parish of Clyne, Sutherland, Scotland, who first broke the forest in 1820. They were former crofters on the Sutherland Estate who were removed as part of an agricultural improvement scheme. The settlement became part of the Earltown district with inhabitants sharing a common culture, origin and language as the people of the whole district.

Agriculture and lumbering were the main occupations, with several water-powered sawmills once operating in the area. In the mid twentieth century, a small hydroelectric plant operated in the river gorge. The community once had its own school, (closed 1969), a Presbyterian church, a United church and a general store. Of these, only the United Church remains open.
