= Nova Scotia Route 256 =

Highway in Nova Scotia, Canada

Route 256

Route information
- Maintained by Nova Scotia Department of Transportation and Infrastructure Renewal
- Length: 49 km (30 mi)

Major junctions
- West end: Route 246 in West New Annan
- Route 311 in The Falls; Route 326 in East Earltown & MacBains Corner
- East end: Route 376 in Lyons Brook

Location
- Country: Canada
- Province: Nova Scotia

Highway system
- Provincial highways in Nova Scotia; 100-series
← Route 255	→ Route 276

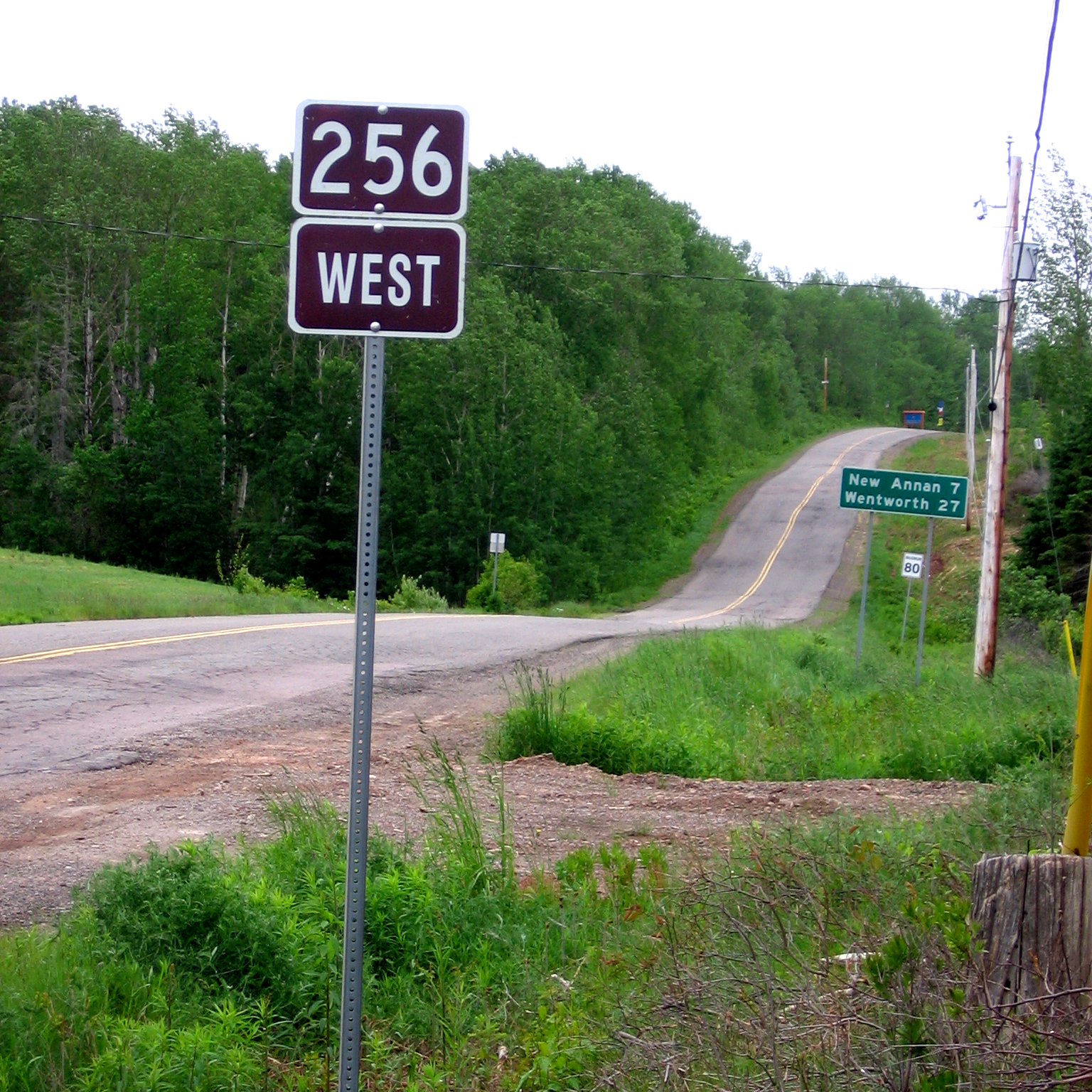
Start of Route 256 in West New Annan.

Route 256 is a collector road in the Canadian province of Nova Scotia.

It is located in the northern part of the province and connects West New Annan at Route 246 with Lyons Brook at Route 376.

== Communities ==
- West New Annan
- The Falls
- West Branch River John
- River John
- Scotsburn
- Lyons Brook

== Museums ==
- Balmoral Grist Mill

== See also ==
- List of Nova Scotia provincial highways
