= Coldstream, Nova Scotia =

Community in Nova Scotia, Canada

Coordinates: 45°3′49.76″N 63°19′15.87″W

Coldstream in Nova Scotia

Coldstream is an unincorporated community in the Canadian province of Nova Scotia, located in Colchester County. It was named for Coldstream in the Scottish Borders.
