= Bayhead, Nova Scotia =

Community in Nova Scotia, Canada

Coordinates: 45°44′34.26″N 63°22′17.56″W

Bayhead in Nova Scotia

Bayhead is an unincorporated community in the Canadian province of Nova Scotia, located in Colchester County. It is located at the head of Tatamagouche Bay, and geographic features in the area are historically associated with the name Gouzar.
