= Lanesville, Nova Scotia =

Community in Nova Scotia, Canada

Coordinates: 45°8′18.46″N 63°14′28.2″W

Lanesville in Nova Scotia

Lanesville is an unincorporated community in the Canadian province of Nova Scotia, located in Colchester County. The community is named for early settlers in the area with the surname "Lane".

The earliest land grant in the area was given to Benjamin Sibley in 1854. By the 1870s, there was a house and a sawmill in Lanesville. More land grants were provided to Shelometh Sibley in 1874, James Irwin in 1877, James Pool in 1877, William Gibson in 1878, Jeffry Burgess in 1882, and William H. Andrews in 1889.

The population of Lanesville was 140 in 1956.
