= Alton, Nova Scotia =

Community in Nova Scotia, Canada

Coordinates: 45°11′1.87″N 63°18′5.42″W

Alton in Nova Scotia

Alton (2006 pop.: 1,906) is an unincorporated community in the Canadian province of Nova Scotia, located in Colchester County. Originally named Polly Bog, the name was changed in 1880. Alton was the location of a proposed natural gas storage facility from salt caverns. The project was abandoned in 2021 following from longstanding opposition from Mi'kmaq water protectors of Sipekne'katik, residents living near the cavern site and environmental groups.

The Canadian National Railway line between Truro, Nova Scotia, and Halifax, Nova Scotia, passes through Alton.
