= Otter Brook, Nova Scotia =

Community in Nova Scotia, Canada

Coordinates: 45°13′44.92″N 63°2′45.87″W

Otter Brook in Nova Scotia

Otter Brook is a community in the Canadian province of Nova Scotia, located in Colchester County.
