= Wittenburg, Nova Scotia =

Community in Nova Scotia, Canada

Coordinates: 45°5′35.36″N 63°13′54.52″W

Wittenburg in Nova Scotia

Wittenburg is an unincorporated community in the Canadian province of Nova Scotia, located in Colchester County. It was named for Wittenberg, Germany, due to the resemblance of the local church to the church where Martin Luther nailed up his 95 theses.
