= East Earltown =

Community in Nova Scotia, Canada

Coordinates: 45°40′15″N 63°7′45″W

East Earltown in Nova Scotia

East Earltown is a community in the Canadian province of Nova Scotia, located in Colchester County.
