= Newton Mills =

Community in Nova Scotia, Canada

Coordinates: 45°13′50.91″N 62°55′30.65″W

Newton Mills in Nova Scotia

Newton Mills is an unincorporated community in the Canadian province of Nova Scotia, located in Colchester County.
