= Stewiacke River =

Coordinates: 45°8′19.77″N 63°22′35.48″W

Stewiacke
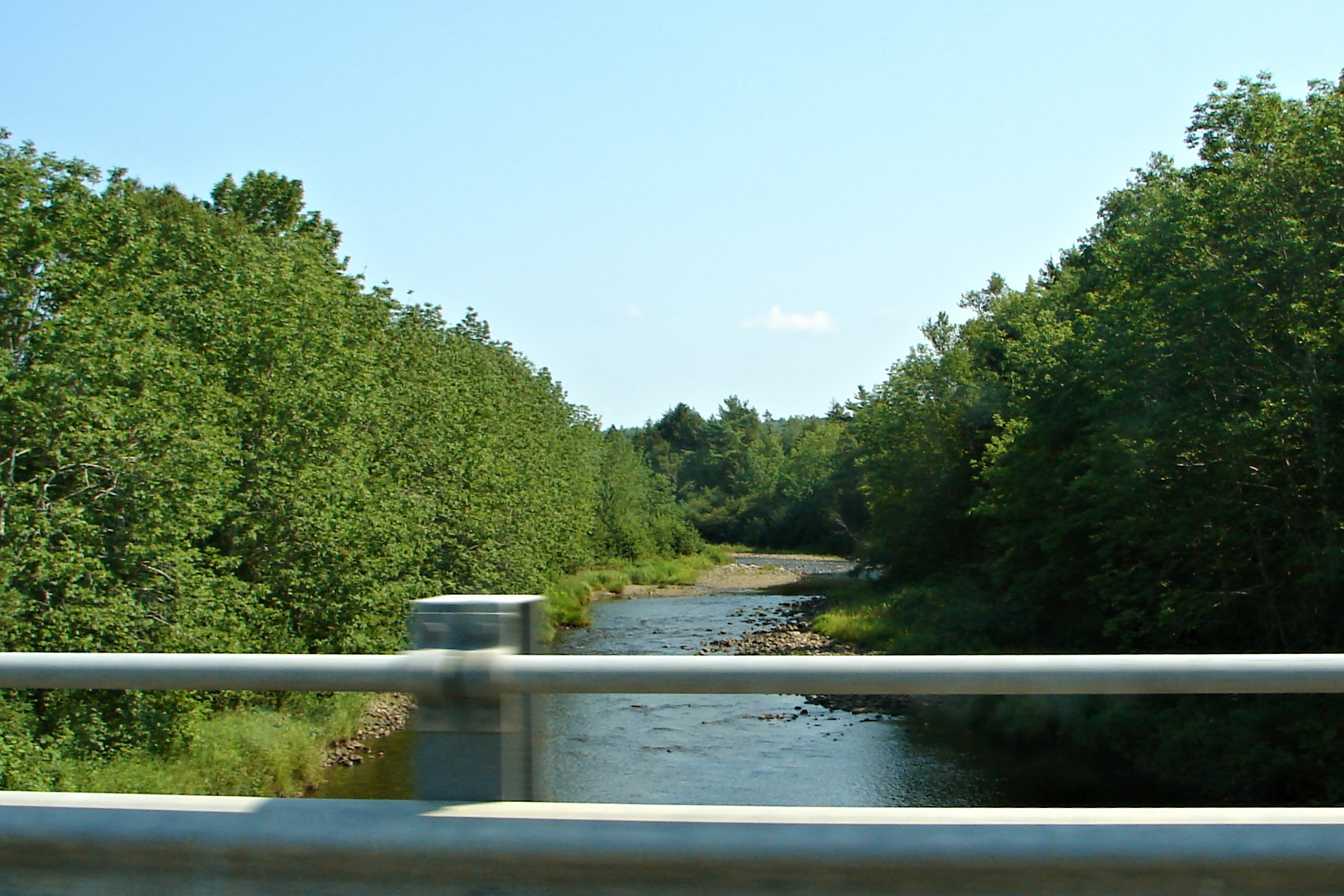
- Stewiacke River near Eastville

- Map of the Shubenacadie / Stewiacke drainage basin

Location
- Country: Canada
- Province: Nova Scotia

Physical characteristics
- Mouth
  - location: Confluence of the Shubenacadie River
- Basin size: 1,304 km^{2} (503 sq mi) (together with Shubenacadie River)

Basin features
- Progression: Shubenacadie River—Cobequid Bay—Minas Basin—Bay of Fundy

The Stewiacke River is a river in the Canadian province of Nova Scotia that starts at Round Lake in Pictou County and flows into the Shubenacadie River in Colchester County running through the Stewiacke Valley.

== Atlantic Salmon ==
Historically the Stewiacke River was home to a population of the Inner Bay of Fundy (IBoF) population of Atlantic Salmon, A commercial fishery existed on the river until the mid 1980's and a popular sport fishery as well. A promotional movie was filmed in Middle Stewiacke in 1983 by Lee Wulff and Joan Wulff titled "Autumn Silver". In 1989, the salmon returns started a steep decline that led to the closure of the Stewiacke as well as all other IBoF rivers.

== See also ==
- List of rivers of Nova Scotia
