= Earltown =

Community in Nova Scotia, Canada

Coordinates: 45°34′39.94″N 63°8′16.48″W

Earltown in Nova Scotia

Earltown (Baile-an-Iarla) is an unincorporated community in the Canadian province of Nova Scotia, located in Colchester County.

The community is located 25 km north of the town of Truro on Route 311, on the north slope of the Cobequid Mountains.

== History ==
Earltown was included within the Philadelphia grant of 1765. European settlement commenced in 1813 as an extension of the Highland Scot settlements in Western Pictou County. The two earliest settlers were Angus Sutherland and Donald MacIntosh, natives of Rogart, Sutherland, Scotland, who had previously settled in Pictou County. In the following years they were joined by approximately 100 families who immigrated directly from the Sutherland, Ross and Caithness, Scotland.

The earliest name for the settlement was New Portugal, some of the settlers having fought in the Peninsular War. The name was subsequently changed to Earltown in honour of the Earl of Dalhousie. The name for the community can be traced to several Scottish settlers who came from the Earl of Sutherland's estate and located in northern Colchester County about 1816.

At its height in the late 1800s, the area boasted a population of 2,000 with most residents employed in farming and forestry.

The area currently has a population of approximately 250 residents.
