= Eastville, Nova Scotia =

Community in Nova Scotia, Canada

Coordinates: 45°13′50.91″N 62°55′30.65″W

Eastville in Nova Scotia

Eastville is a community in the Canadian province of Nova Scotia, located in Colchester County.

The locality of Springside is located within Eastville.
