= West New Annan =

Community in Nova Scotia, Canada

Coordinates: 45°38′21″N 63°21′39″W

West New Annan in Nova Scotia

West New Annan is a community in the Canadian province of Nova Scotia, located in Colchester County.
