= Stewiacke =

- Town
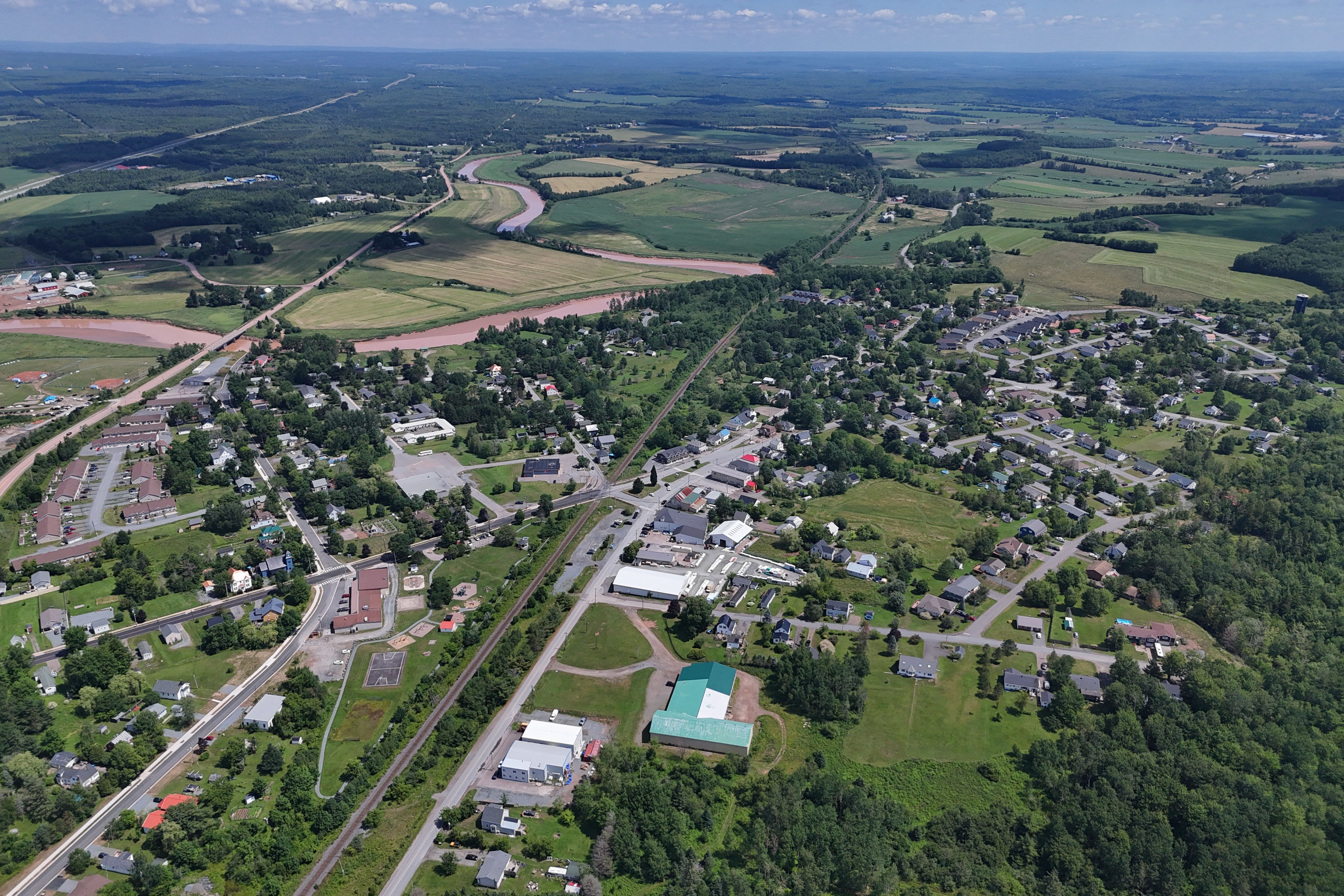
- Aerial view of Stewiacke in 2025

- Flag Coat of arms
- Nickname: Halfway between the North Pole and the Equator
- Motto: Respect, Prosperity, Growth
- Location of Stewiacke, Nova Scotia
- Coordinates: 45°8′32″N 63°20′54″W
- Country: Canada
- Province: Nova Scotia
- Municipality: Colchester County
- Incorporated: August 30, 1906

Government
  - Mayor: Doug Glasser
  - Governing Body: Stewiacke Town Council
  - MLA: Larry Harrison
  - MP: Stephen Ellis (C)

Area (2021)
  - Total: 17.62 km^{2} (6.80 sq mi)
- Elevation: 100 m (330 ft)

Population (2021)
  - Total: 1,557
  - Density: 88.4/km^{2} (229/sq mi)
- Time zone: UTC−4 (AST)
  - Summer (DST): UTC−3 (ADT)
- Postal code: B0N 2J0
- Area code: 902
- Telephone Exchange: 639, 671
- Median Earnings*: $65,500
- NTS Map: 11E3 Shubenacadie
- GNBC Code: CBKOM
- Website: stewiacke.net
- Median household income, 2020; Places in Nova Scotia

Stewiacke (/ˈstjuːiæk/) is a town located in southern Colchester County, Nova Scotia, Canada. The town was incorporated on August 30, 1906.

== Geography ==
The town is located in the Stewiacke Valley, at the confluence of the Stewiacke and Shubenacadie Rivers, and is a service and support centre for local agricultural communities as well as a service exit on Highway 102.

The town is noted as being located halfway between the North Pole and the Equator (which is actually in Alton, Nova Scotia). Controversy in the past over that claim stems from the fact that the Earth is not a perfect sphere and so the halfway mark lies approximately 16 km north of the 45th parallel.

=== Parks and trails ===
- Dennis Park
- Stewiacke River Park
- Stewiacke Recreation Grounds
- Barking Lot - Off Leash Dog Park
- John Crawford Trail
- Stewiacke River Country Trail
- Fish Shack Trail
- Caddell Rapids Lookoff Provincial Park

== History ==
Stewiacke was named in the language of the local Mi'kmaq First Nations and is a word meaning "flowing out in small streams" and "winding river" or "whimpering or whining as it goes". During the French and Indian War, the British built Fort Ellis in the area to protect New England Planters from Mi'kmaq raids.

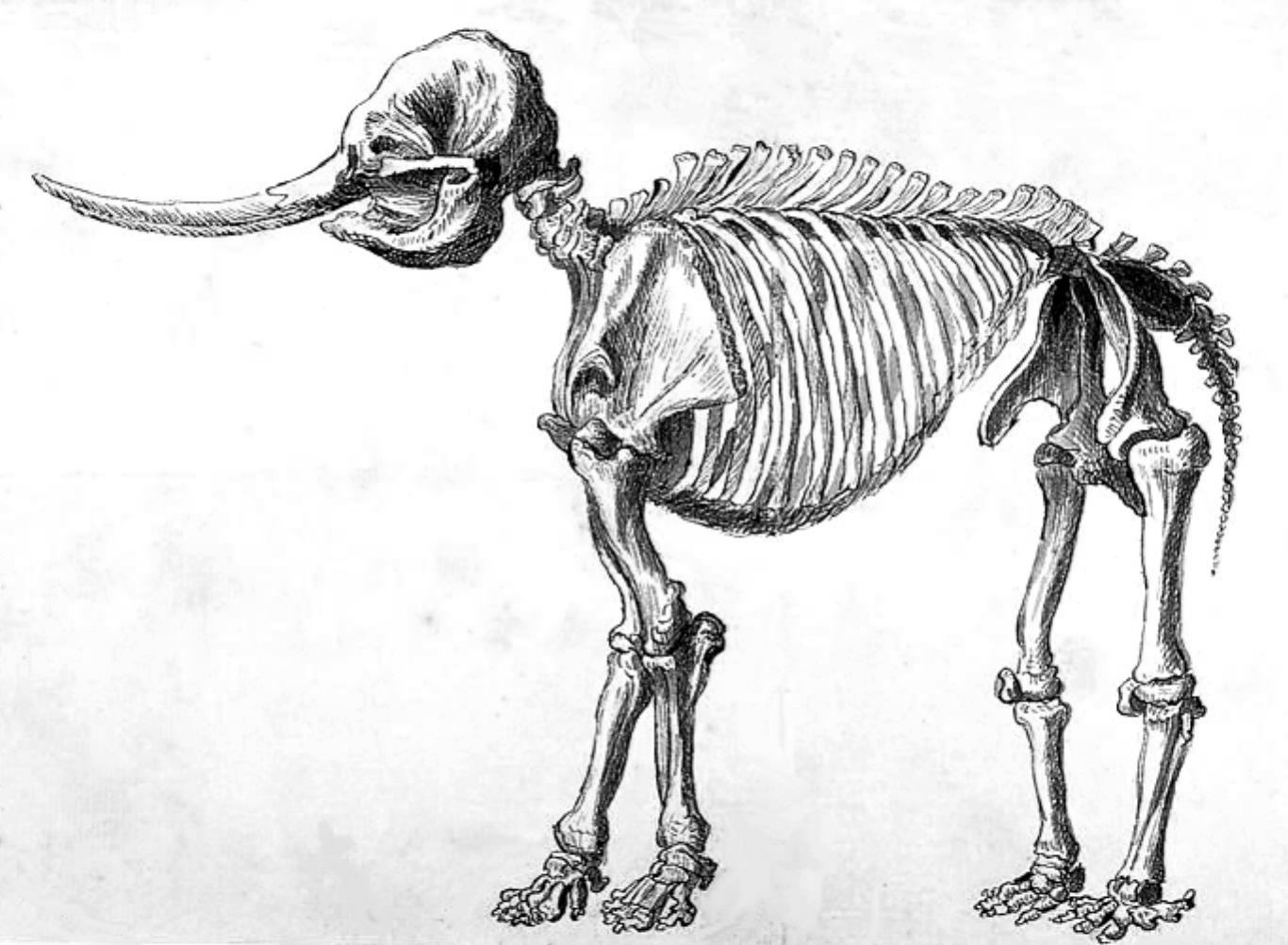
Drawing of a mastodon skeleton by Rembrandt Peale

In the late 1990s, a tourism attraction named Mastodon Ridge opened near the town's highway exit, based on a local discovery of a mastodon skeleton. The Mastodon Ridge Complex features a craft store, toy store, a mini golf and interpretive centre which displays several of the mastodon's bones.

Stewiacke is home to a bar, a pharmacy, a grocery store, a pizzeria, numerous fast food restaurants, two gas stations, a hardware store, an 18-hole golf course and a newly built elementary school that consolidates 2 former local schools.

Stewiacke is also home to a volunteer fire brigade that was the first department in North America to use specialized foam as a fire suppression agent, alongside other achievements involving the implementation of certain fire apparatus.

The town's most notorious event occurred on April 12, 2001, when a local teenager, at home on a school in-service day, tampered with a railway switch on the CN Rail Halifax-Montreal mainline, causing Via Rail Canada's Ocean to derail several minutes later when it passed through the centre of the community. Several buildings and rail cars were destroyed and many people were injured, including some severely, although no fatalities resulted.

On June 30, 2021, Stewiacke was hit by an EF1 tornado.

In 2023, the Boston Christmas Tree came from Stewiacke.

== Demographics ==
Historical population
Year	Pop.	±%
1956	1,024	—
1961	1,042	+1.8%
1981	1,201	+15.3%
1986	1,265	+5.3%
1991	1,306	+3.2%
1996	1,405	+7.6%
2001	1,388	−1.2%
2006	1,421	+2.4%
2011	1,438	+1.2%
2016	1,373	−4.5%
2021	1,557	+13.4%

In the 2021 Census of Population conducted by Statistics Canada, Stewiacke had a population of 1,557 living in 713 of its 739 total private dwellings, a change of 13.4% from its 2016 population of 1,373. With a land area of 17.62 km^{2} (6.80 sq mi), it had a population density of 88.4/km^{2} (228.9/sq mi) in 2021.

== Notable residents ==
- Hanson Dowell (1906–2000), president of the Canadian Amateur Hockey Association and member of the Nova Scotia House of Assembly

== See also ==
- List of municipalities in Nova Scotia
