= Colchester County =

- County
- Municipality of the County of Colchester
- From top proceeding clockwise: Creamery Square in Tatamagouche, beach near Bass River, Glooscap monument in Millbrook, farm near Stewiacke, NSCC in Truro.

- Flag Coat of arms
- Nickname: Municipality of Colchester
- Motto: "We Prosper From Our Resources"
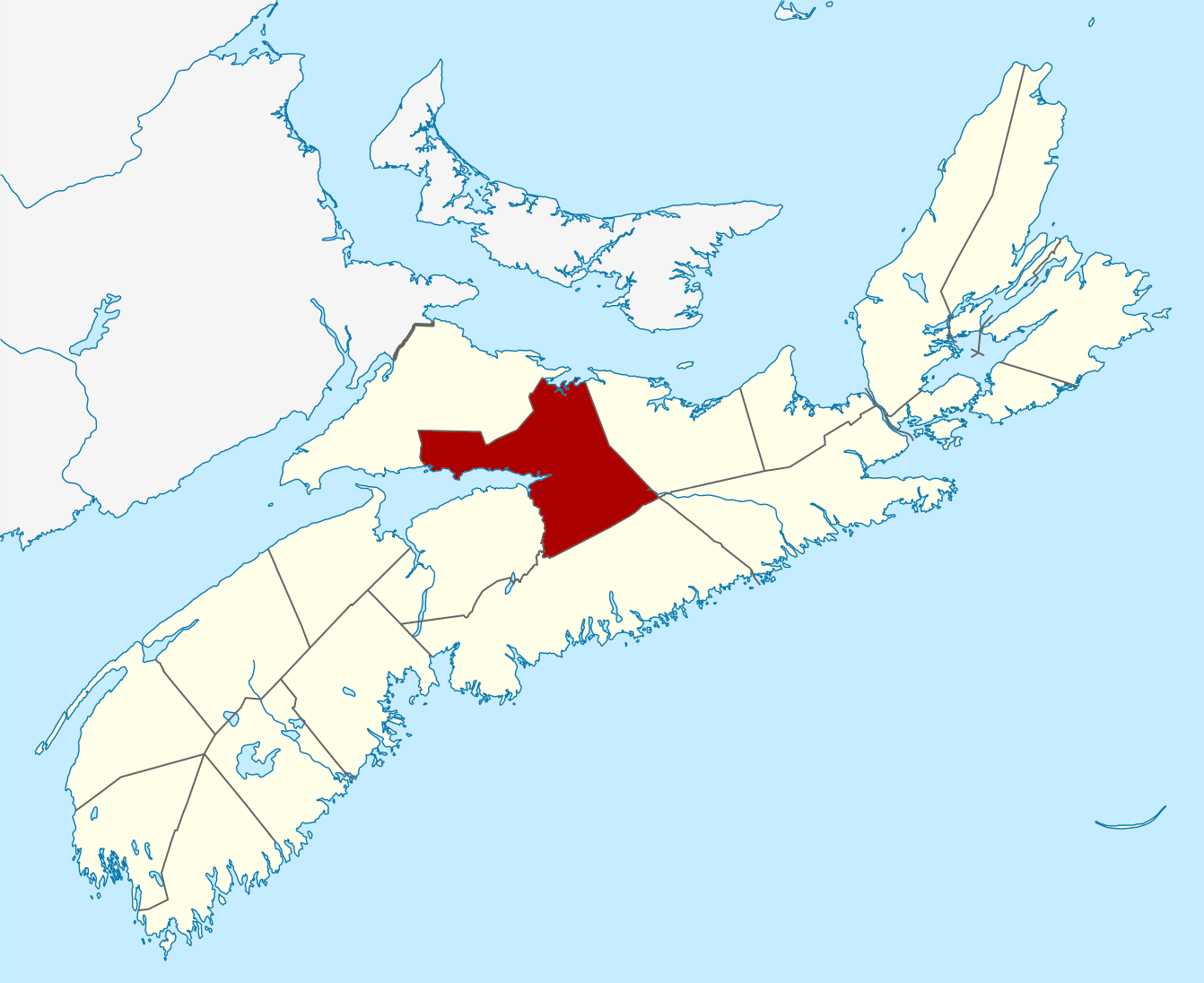
- Location of Colchester County, Nova Scotia
- Coordinates: 45°21′56″N 63°16′32″W
- Country: Canada
- Province: Nova Scotia
- Towns: Stewiacke / Truro
- Villages: Bible Hill / Tatamagouche
- Established: 1835
- Incorporated: April 17, 1879
- Electoral Districts Federal: Cumberland—Colchester—Musquodoboit Valley
- Provincial: Colchester North / Colchester-Musquodoboit Valley / Truro-Bible Hill

Government
  - Type: Colchester County Municipal Council
  - Mayor: Christine Blair

Area
  - Land: 3,627.50 km^{2} (1,400.59 sq mi)

Population (2021)
  - Total: 51,476
  - Density: 14.2/km^{2} (37/sq mi)
  - Change 2016-21: ▲1.8%
- Time zone: UTC-4 (AST)
  - Summer (DST): UTC-3 (ADT)
- Area codes: 902, 782
- Dwellings: 25,378
- Median Income*: $42,782 CDN
- Website: colchester.ca
- Median household income, 2005 (all households)

Colchester County (Scottish Gaelic: Siorramachd Dhùn Chamuluis) is a county in the Canadian province of Nova Scotia. With a population of 51,476 the county is the fourth largest in Nova Scotia. Colchester County is located in north central Nova Scotia.

The majority of the county is governed by the Municipality of the County of Colchester, the county also is home to two independent incorporated towns, Stewiacke and Truro, two village commissions in Bible Hill and Tatamagouche, and the Millbrook 27 First Nations reserve.

== History ==
The glaciers began their retreat from in the Maritimes approximately 13,500 years ago. The earliest evidence of Palaeo-Indian settlement in the region follows rapidly after deglaciation. The record of continuous habitation through the paleo and archaic period over ten thousand years culminated in the development of the culture, traditions, and language now known as the Mi'kmaq. For several thousand years the territory of the province has been a part of the territory of the Mi'kmaq nation of Mi'kma'ki. Mi'kma'ki includes what is now the Maritimes, parts of Maine, Newfoundland and the Gaspé Peninsula. Colchester County is located in the traditional Mi'kmaw districts of Sipekni'katik to the south and west, and Epekwitk aq Piktuk to the north and east.

French colonization of the area began during the 1680s. Acadian settlers were farmers were accustomed to farming on dyked lands in France. They used normally salty but fertile marshes that were found on the banks of the Minas Basin and through the use of dykes and aboiteaux that allowed fresh water to enter but kept out the salt-water tide.

The appellation Colchester was applied in 1780 to the district previously called "Cobequid," and was derived from the town of Colchester in Essex. The old name Cobequid was derived from the Mi'kmaq word "Wagobagitk" meaning "the bay runs far up", in reference to the area surrounding the easternmost inlet of the Minas Basin, a body of water called Cobequid Bay.

The District of Colchester, which was at first part of Halifax County, was established as a county in its own right in 1835. In 1838 a distinct line of division between Cumberland County and Colchester County was established. Two years later, in 1840, the Township of Parrsboro was divided and part of it annexed to Colchester County. In 1871, the boundaries between the Counties of Hants and Colchester and between the Counties of Halifax and Colchester were established. In 1880 the boundary between the Counties of Halifax and Colchester was revised. Eventually in 1897 a portion of the boundary between the Counties of Colchester and Cumberland was fixed and defined.

The question of the boundary between Colchester and Cumberland Counties was the subject of a Commission of Inquiry established in 1946. The report was filed in the office of the Provincial Secretary and in the office of the Department of Lands and Forests in January 1959. Certified copies of it were sent to the Registrars of Deeds for the Counties of Colchester, Cumberland and Kings.

== Government ==
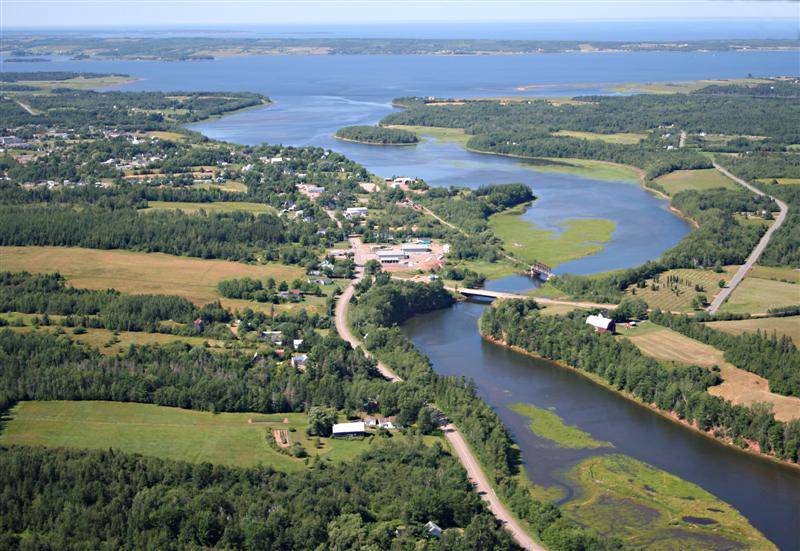
The village of Tatamagouche

The Municipality of the County of Colchester is governed by a municipal council composed of a Mayor elected at-large and 11 Councillors elected to represent districts. Municipal Council is responsible oversee the provision of the services of municipal government. Municipal governments in Nova Scotia are Council–manager governments, meaning that the Council provides policy direction and approves the budget, and the Chief Administrative Officer oversees the administrative operations and implement Council's policies. Directly delivered services include services such as fire protection, public works, roads, and water. The municipality participates in shared services, such as police, solid waste management, library services, and the Rath Eastlink Community Centre.

The municipal operating budget was $29.1 million in 2017/18. The current mayor is Christine Blair. Municipal governments in Nova Scotia are elected every four years and the most recent round of elections took place on October 15, 2016. The provincial legislation that creates and empowers the municipality is the Nova Scotia Municipal Government Act.

While the majority of the land area of county is governed by the Municipal Council of the Municipality of the County of Colchester the county also includes two independently incorporated towns, Stewiacke and Truro, as well as the independently governed Millbrook First Nation. Within the county are also two communities with incorporated village commissions in Bible Hill and Tatamagouche which are a part of the county wide municipality but are created to provide additional village services. Colchester is represented by three ridings in the Nova Scotia House of Assembly and two ridings in Canada's House of Commons.

== Communities ==
Towns

- Stewiacke
- Truro

Villages

- Bible Hill
- Tatamagouche

Unincorporated communities

- Manganese Mines

Reserves

- Millbrook 27

County municipality and subdivisions

- Municipality of the County of Colchester
  - Colchester Subdivision A
  - Colchester Subdivision B
  - Colchester Subdivision C

== Demographics ==
As a census division in the 2021 Census of Population conducted by Statistics Canada, Colchester County had a population of 51,476 living in 23,056 of its 25,638 total private dwellings, a change of 1.8% from its 2016 population of 50,585. With a land area of 3,627.5 km^{2} (1,400.6 sq mi), it had a population density of 14.2/km^{2} (36.8/sq mi) in 2021.

Forming the majority of the Colchester County census division, the Municipality of the County of Colchester, including its Subdivisions A, B, and C, had a population of 36,044 living in 15,665 of its 17,877 total private dwellings, a change of −0.1% from its 2016 population of 36,091. With a land area of 3,568.71 km^{2} (1,377.89 sq mi), it had a population density of 10.1/km^{2} (26.2/sq mi) in 2021.

Population trend

Census	Population	Change (%)
2021	51,476	▲1.8%
2016	50,585	▼0.8%
2011	50,968	▲1.9%
2006	50,023	▲1.5%
2001	49,307	▲0.1%
1996	49,262	▲3.3%
1991	47,683	▲5.7%
1986	45,093	▲4.3%
1981	43,244	N/A
1941	30,124	
1931	25,051	
1921	25,196	
1911	23,664	
1901	24,900	
1891	27,160	
1881	26,720	
1871	23,331	N/A

=== Ethnicity ===
Panethnic groups in Colchester County (2001−2021)
Panethnic group	2021		2016		2011		2006		2001	
Panethnic group	Pop.	%	Pop.	%	Pop.	%	Pop.	%	Pop.	%
European (Note: Statistic includes all persons that did not make up part of a visible minority or an indigenous identity.)	45,550	90.05%	45,455	91.4%	47,050	94.04%	47,080	95.08%	46,610	95.54%
Indigenous	2,785	5.51%	2,585	5.2%	1,935	3.87%	1,280	2.59%	1,115	2.29%
African	880	1.74%	865	1.74%	645	1.29%	705	1.42%	635	1.3%
South Asian	575	1.14%	245	0.49%	145	0.29%	180	0.36%	170	0.35%
Southeast Asian (Note: Statistic includes total responses of "Filipino" and "Southeast Asian" under visible minority section on census.)	270	0.53%	205	0.41%	40	0.08%	30	0.06%	90	0.18%
East Asian (Note: Statistic includes total responses of "Chinese", "Korean", and "Japanese" under visible minority section on census.)	235	0.46%	185	0.37%	130	0.26%	105	0.21%	80	0.16%
Middle Eastern (Note: Statistic includes total responses of "West Asian" and "Arab" under visible minority section on census.)	185	0.37%	105	0.21%	55	0.11%	75	0.15%	55	0.11%
Latin American	65	0.13%	75	0.15%	0	0%	55	0.11%	20	0.04%
Other/multiracial (Note: Statistic includes total responses of "Visible minority, n.i.e." and "Multiple visible minorities" under visible minority section on census.)	55	0.11%	25	0.05%	0	0%	30	0.06%	20	0.04%
Total responses	50,585	98.27%	49,730	98.31%	50,030	98.16%	49,515	98.98%	48,785	98.94%
Total population	51,476	100%	50,585	100%	50,968	100%	50,023	100%	49,307	100%
Note: Totals greater than 100% due to multiple origin responses

Ethnic Origin (2006)

Ethnic Origin	Population	Pct (%)
Canadian	20,510	41.4%
Scottish	19,455	39.3%
English	16,060	32.4%
Irish	11,155	22.5%
French	5,880	11.9%
German	4,085	8.3%
Dutch (Netherlands)	2,480	5.0%
North American Indian	2,100	4.2%

=== Language ===
Mother tongue language (2011)

Language	Population	Pct (%)
English only	48,580	96.34%
French only	560	1.11%
Non-official languages	1,065	2.11%
Multiple responses	225	0.45%

== Access Routes ==
Highways and numbered routes that run through the county, including external routes that start or finish at the county limits:

- Highways
  - Hwy 102
  - Hwy 104 (TCH)
- Trunk Routes
  - Trunk 2
  - Trunk 4
  - Trunk 6
- Collector Routes:
  - Route 224
  - Route 236
  - Route 246
  - Route 256
  - Route 289
  - Route 311
  - Route 326
  - Route 336
- External Routes:
  - Route 277

== See also ==
- List of municipalities in Nova Scotia
- Black Lake listings within Nova Scotia
