= List of shipwrecks in 1758 =

The List of shipwrecks in 1758 includes some ships sunk, wrecked or otherwise lost during 1758.

table of contents
1758
Jan	Feb	Mar	Apr
May	Jun	Jul	Aug
Sep	Oct	Nov	Dec
Unknown date

== January ==
=== 14 January ===
List of shipwrecks: 14 January 1758
Ship	State	Description
Greenwich	French Navy	The ship of the line was wrecked near Plougastel.

=== 19 January ===
List of shipwrecks: 19 January 1758
Ship	State	Description
Neptune	France	The ship, a prize of HMS Roebuck ( (Kingdom of Great Britain) Royal Navy) foundered in the English Channel off St Albans Head, Dorset, Great Britain.

=== 26 January ===
List of shipwrecks: 26 January 1758
Ship	State	Description
Friendship	Great Britain	The ship foundered off the Isles of Scilly. She was on a voyage from London to Bristol, Gloucestershire.

=== Unknown date ===
List of shipwrecks: Unknown date in January 1758
Ship	State	Description
Aurora	Spain	The ship foundered whilst on a voyage from Guernsey, Channel Islands, to Bilbao with the loss of a crew member.
Duke Packet	Great Britain	The privateer was destroyed off Hispaniola by HMS Assistance ( (Kingdom of Great Britain) Royal Navy).
Earl of Granville	(Kingdom of Great Britain) Jersey	The privateer foundered off Portland, Dorset. Her crew were rescued.
Emanuel	Great Britain	The ship was lost near Padstow, Cornwall. Her crew were rescued. She was on a voyage from Seville, Spain, to London.
Frime	France	The ship, a prize of HMS Dolphin ( (Kingdom of Great Britain) Royal Navy), ran onto that ship's anchor and sank at Waterford, Ireland.
George	(Kingdom of Great Britain) British America	The ship was lost off Barbados.
Jesu Nazareno	Spain	The ship was lost near San Lucar. She was on a voyage from Seville to Morlaix, France.
Kingston	Great Britain	The ship was lost on the Colorados. She was on a voyage from Jamaica to Liverpool, Lancashire.
Neptune	Great Britain	The ship was lost near Cádiz, Spain. She was on a voyage from Gibraltar to Seville.
Nostra Señora del Rosario	Great Britain	The ship was wrecked near San Lucar with the loss of about 150 of her 200 crew. She was on a voyage from Cádiz to Carthagena, Viceroyalty of Peru.
Nossa Senhora da Nazaré	Portugal	The ship was driven ashore and wrecked at Shoreham-by-Sea, Sussex, Great Britain. She was on a voyage from Porto to London.
Rotation	Great Britain	The ship was lost on the Colorados. She was on a voyage from Jamaica to London.
Rotterdam Packet	Great Britain	The ship foundered in the Atlantic Ocean off Cape Finisterre, Spain. Her crew were rescued. She was on a voyage from Seville to London.
St Francis	(Kingdom of Great Britain) British America	The ship was lost on Sandy Island, South Carolina. She was on a voyage from Philadelphia, Pennsylvania, to Antigua.

== February ==
=== 16 February ===
List of shipwrecks: 16 February 1758
Ship	State	Description
Success	Great Britain	The ship was driven ashore near Boston, Massachusetts. British America. She was on a voyage from London to Boston.

=== 18 February ===
List of shipwrecks: 18 February 1758
Ship	State	Description
Marcella	Portugal	The ship ran aground and was wrecked 3 leagues (9 nautical miles (17 km)) off Charlestown, South Carolina, British America, and was wrecked. She was on a voyage from Lisbon to Charlestown.

=== Unknown date ===
List of shipwrecks: Unknown date in February 1758
Ship	State	Description
Boscawen	Great Britain	The ship was lost off Cádiz, Spain. She was on a voyage from Plymouth, Devon, to Seville, Spain.
Cicelia	Great Britain	The ship was driven ashore and wrecked near Saint Andrews, Fife. Her crew were rescued.
Cyprus	Great Britain	The ship was driven ashore on the south coast of the Isle of Wight and was wrecked. She was on a voyage from Smyrna, Ottoman Empire, to Amsterdam, Dutch Republic.
Elizabeth and Janet	Great Britain	The ship was lost on the Scottish coast. She was on a voyage from Virginia, British America, to Glasgow, Renfrewshire.
Fortrose	Great Britain	The ship was driven ashore and wrecked near Saint Andrews with the loss of three of her crew.
Furnace	Great Britain	The ship ran aground off the Isles of Scilly and was wrecked. She was on a voyage from London to Newry, County Down, Ireland.
Hibernia	Ireland	The ship was lost near Caernarfon, Great Britain. She was on a voyage from Philadelphia, Pennsylvania, to Dublin.
HMS Invincible	(Kingdom of Great Britain) Royal Navy	The third rate ship of the line ran aground and sank in the Solent. Her crew survived.
Mermaid	Ireland	The ship was wrecked on the Irish coast. She was on a voyage from Dublin to Rotterdam, Dutch Republic.
Molly	Great Britain	The ship was lost on the south west coast of Ireland.
Santa Speredon	Spain	The ship ran aground off Cádiz and was wrecked. She was bound for Lima, Viceroyalty of Peru.

== March ==
=== 7 March ===
List of shipwrecks: 7 March 1758
Ship	State	Description
Eliza	Great Britain	The ship was captured and burnt by the privateer Aurora (France). She was on a voyage from Lisbon, Portugal, to Newfoundland, British America.

=== 10 March ===
List of shipwrecks: 10 March 1758
Ship	State	Description
Williamson	Great Britain	The ship foundered in the North Sea off Great Yarmouth, Norfolk. Her crew were rescued. She was on a voyage from Hull, Yorkshire, to London.

=== 27 March ===
List of shipwrecks: 27 March 1758
Ship	State	Description
York	Great Britain	The ship foundered in the Atlantic Ocean. Her crew were rescued by Prince George (Great Britain).

=== Unknown date ===
List of shipwrecks: Unknown date in March 1758
Ship	State	Description
Fly	Ireland	The ship was wrecked in Plymouth Sound. Her crew were rescued.
Pacten Engle	(Denmark) Norway	The ship foundered in The Swin, in the Thames Estuary. Her crew were rescued.
Saint Anthony	Great Britain	The ship foundered whilst on a voyage from Seville to London. Her crew were rescued by a British privateer.
Sarah	Great Britain	The ship foundered in the Hamoaze. Her crew were rescued. She was on a voyage from Plymouth, Devon, to London.
Sophia	France	The ship was lost near Bayonne. She was on a voyage from Bayonne to La Rochelle.
St. Anna	Spain	The ship was wrecked on the Spanish coast.

== April ==
=== 13 April ===
List of shipwrecks: 13 April 1758
Ship	State	Description
Inger Stine	Great Britain	The ship foundered in the North Sea off Great Yarmouth, Norfolk. She was on a voyage from Great Yarmouth to Bordeaux, France.
Katherine	Great Britain	The ship was driven ashore at Falmouth, Cornwall. She was on a voyage from Barnstaple, Devon, to London.

=== 14 April ===
List of shipwrecks: 14 April 1758
Ship	State	Description
St Pedro	Spain	The ship foundered in the Atlantic Ocean 40 leagues (120 nautical miles (220 km)) off Vigo. Her crew were rescued. She was on a voyage from Morlaix, France, to Cádiz.

=== 15 April ===
List of shipwrecks: 15 April 1758
Ship	State	Description
William & Jane	Great Britain	The ship foundered in the Atlantic Ocean 130 leagues (390 nautical miles (720 km) west of The Lizard, Cornwall. Her crew were rescued by the privateer Looly François (France). She was on a voyage from London to the Canary Islands.

=== 28 April ===
List of shipwrecks: 28 April 1758
Ship	State	Description
HMS Bridgewater	(Kingdom of Great Britain) Royal Navy	The sixth rate was run ashore and burnt at Madras, India.
HMS Triton	(Kingdom of Great Britain) Royal Navy	The sixth rate was burnt at Madras to avoid capture by the French.

=== 29 April ===
List of shipwrecks: 29 April 1758
Ship	State	Description
Bien-Aimé	French East India Company	Battle of Cuddalore: The East Indiaman was driven ashore at Cuddalore, India. She was a total loss.

=== Unknown date ===
List of shipwrecks: Unknown date in April 1758
Ship	State	Description
Elizabeth	Ireland	The ship was lost near Cádiz, Spain. She was on a voyage from Cork to Gibraltar.
Faithful	Great Britain	The ship was lost near South Yarmouth, Isle of Wight. She was on a voyage from Salcombe, Devon, to London.
Nostra Señora L'Africa	Spain	The ship was driven ashore at Málaga. She was on a voyage from Málaga to Guernsey, Channel Islands.
Stephen	Dutch Republic	The ship was lost on the Irish coast. She was on a voyage from Rotterdam to Newry, County Antrim, Ireland.
Swift	Great Britain	The ship was lost on the coast of Sardinia. She was on a voyage from Livorno, Grand Duchy of Tuscany, to London.
Unity	Great Britain	The ship was driven ashore and wrecked at Dublin, Ireland.

== May ==
=== 12 May ===
List of shipwrecks: 12 May 1758
Ship	State	Description
Nelly	Great Britain	The ship was captured and burnt by four French Navy ships. She was on a voyage from South Carolina, British America, to London.

=== Unknown date ===
List of shipwrecks: Unknown date in May 1758
Ship	State	Description
St Elena	Spain	The ship was lost near Vigo. She was on a voyage from Seville to London, Great Britain.

== June ==
=== 13 June ===
List of shipwrecks: 13 June 1758
Ship	State	Description
Thomas	Great Britain	The ship foundered in the English Channel off Shoreham-by-Sea, Sussex. Her crew were rescued.

=== Unknown date ===
List of shipwrecks: Unknown date in June 1758
Ship	State	Description
Success	Ireland	The ship was captured and burnt by two French Navy frigates. Her crew were taken on board the French vessels. She was on a voyage from Dublin to Antigua.
Sukey	Great Britain	The ship was driven ashore and wrecked on Fyal, Azores. She was on a voyage from Jamaica to London.

== July ==
=== 2 July ===
List of shipwrecks: 2 July 1758
Ship	State	Description
Rose	French Navy	The fifth rate frigate was scuttled at Malta to avoid capture by HMS Lyme and HMS Marlborough (both (Kingdom of Great Britain) Royal Navy).

=== 6 July ===
List of shipwrecks: 6 July 1758
Ship	State	Description
Janet & Margaret	Great Britain	The ship was wrecked near Berwick-upon-Tweed. Her crew were rescued. She was on a voyage from Gothenburg, Sweden, to the Firth of Forth.

=== 11 July ===
List of shipwrecks: 11 July 1758
Ship	State	Description
St Juen buen Adventure	Spain	The ship ran aground off Prawle Point, Devon, Great Britain. Her crew were rescued. She was on a voyage from Amsterdam, Dutch Republic, to Bilbao.

=== 21 July ===
List of shipwrecks: 21 July 1758
Ship	State	Description
Célèbre	French Navy	French and Indian War, Siege of Louisbourg: The ship of the line was destroyed by fire at Louisbourg, Île-Royale, French North America.
Capricieux	French Navy	French and Indian War, Siege of Louisbourg: The ship of the line was destroyed by fire at Louisbourg.
Entreprenant	French Navy	French and Indian War, Siege of Louisbourg: The ship of the line was destroyed by fire at Louisbourg.
Prudent	French Navy	Prudent. French and Indian War, Siege of Louisbourg: The ship of the line ran aground at Louisbourg. She was captured by the British and set afire.

=== Unknown date ===
List of shipwrecks: Unknown date in July 1758
Ship	State	Description
Friends Adventure	Great Britain	The ship was destroyed by fire off Cromer, Norfolk.
Liverpool	Great Britain	The privateer was driven ashore at Liverpool, Lancashire. Subsequently repaired and returned to service.
Nugent	Great Britain	The ship was captured and burnt by some French Navy ships. She was on a voyage from Bristol, Gloucestershire, to Boston, Massachusetts, British America.
Pownall	Great Britain	The ship was driven ashore and wrecked at Liverpool. She was on a voyage from Antigua to Liverpool.
Sally	Great Britain	The ship was captured and burnt by some French Navy ships. She was on a voyage from Bristol to Newfoundland, British America.
Unity	Great Britain	The ship was run down and sunk whilst on a voyage from Portsmouth, Hampshire, to an American port.

== August ==
=== 5 August ===
List of shipwrecks: 5 August 1758
Ship	State	Description
L'Aigle	French Navy	The fourth rate was wrecked.

=== 20 August ===
List of shipwrecks: 20 August 1758
Ship	State	Description
Speedwell	Great Britain	The ship foundered in the Thames Estuary. She was on a voyage from Lyme, Dorset, to London.

=== 23 August ===
List of shipwrecks: 23 August 1758
Ship	State	Description
Aurora	(Kingdom of Great Britain)	Barbados): The sloop was wrecked at Barbados.
HMS Barbadoes	(Kingdom of Great Britain) Royal Navy	The Sloop-of-War was driven ashore at Barbados. She was later refloated.
Betsey	(Kingdom of Great Britain) Barbados	The schooner was driven ashore at Barbados. She was later refloated.
David and Susannah	(Kingdom of Great Britain) British America	The brig was lost at Barbados.
Frankland	(Kingdom of Great Britain) Barbados	The privateer, a brig, was driven ashore and wrecked at Barbados.
Good Intent	(Kingdom of Great Britain) British America	The ship was driven ashore and wrecked at Barbados.
Jenny and Sally	(Kingdom of Great Britain) British America	The snow was wrecked at Barbados.
Rose	Great Britain	The brig was wrecked at Barbados.

=== Unknown date ===
List of shipwrecks: Unknown date in August 1758
Ship	State	Description
Jannet	Great Britain	The ship foundered in the North Sea. Her crew were rescued. She was on a voyage from Dundee, Perthshire, to Newcastle upon Tyne, Northumberland.
Little Hunter	(Kingdom of Great Britain) British America	The sloop was wrecked whilst on a voyage from Philadelphia, Pennsylvania, to North Carolina.

== September ==
=== 6 September ===
List of shipwrecks: 6 September 1758
Ship	State	Description
Sv. Kapiton	Russian Empire	The vessel was wrecked on a reef off Kiska in the Rat Islands group of the Catherine Archipelago. Her crew survived the wreck and landed on Kiska, but 17 of them died on the island before the vessel Sv Pёtr I Pavel (Russian Empire) rescued the remaining survivors in 1761.

=== 16 September ===
List of shipwrecks: 16 September 1758
Ship	State	Description
Glocester	Great Britain	The ship foundered in the Atlantic Ocean with the loss of a crew member. Survivors were rescued by Prescott (Great Britain). She was on a voyage from South Carolina, British America, to Bristol, Gloucestershire.

=== 19 September ===
List of shipwrecks: 19 September 1758
Ship	State	Description
Not named	Russian Empire	The uncommissioned ship of the line ran aground on a reef off Skagen, Denmark, her hull broke apart on 22 September. Sixteen of her 482 crew were lost when a lifeboat capsized. She was on a voyage from Bergen, Norway to Kronstadt.

=== 26 September ===
List of shipwrecks: 26 September 1758
Ship	State	Description
Moskva (Москва, 'Moscow')	Imperial Russian Navy	The ship of the line ran aground and was wrecked 0.2 nautical miles (400 m) off the coast near Libau, Courland Governorate with the loss of 98 of her 446 crew.

=== Unknown date ===
List of shipwrecks: Unknown date in September 1758
Ship	State	Description
Anne	Ireland	The ship foundered whilst on a voyage from Londonderry to Christiansand, Norway. Her crew were rescued.
Fame	Great Britain	The ship, which had been taken by the French as a prize, was driven ashore evading recapture by HMS Bideford HMS Chatham and HMS Solebay (all (Kingdom of Great Britain) Royal Navy).
Friendship	Ireland	The ship was wrecked on the coast of Ireland. Her crew were rescued. She was on a voyage from the Leeward Islands to Londonderry.
Mercury	Hamburg	The ship was driven ashore and wrecked near Cork, Ireland. She was on a voyage from New York, British America, to Hamburg.
Young Hugo	Dutch Republic	The ship foundered whilst on a voyage from Chester, Cheshire, Great Britain, to Rotterdam. Her crew were rescued by Jongste Pranger (Dutch Republic).

== October ==
=== 19 October ===
List of shipwrecks: 19 October 1758
Ship	State	Description
Martha and Susannah	(Kingdom of Great Britain) Guernsey	The snow foundered whilst on a voyage from Guernsey to Charles Town, South Carolina, British America.

=== 23 October ===
List of shipwrecks: 23 October 1758
Ship	State	Description
Tryal	Great Britain	The privateer was captured and burnt by a French Navy frigate. Her crew were taken on board the frigate and later released.

=== Unknown date ===
List of shipwrecks: Unknown date in October 1758
Ship	State	Description
Anne	Great Britain	The ship was lost near Kronstadt, Russia. She was on a voyage from London to Saint Petersburg, Russia.
Bell	Great Britain	The ship was driven ashore and wrecked near Portleaven, Cornwall.
Deborah	Great Britain	The ship foundered in the North Sea off the mouth of the Humber with the loss of all but one of her crew. She was on a voyage from Jamaica to Hull, Yorkshire.
Elizabeth	Great Britain	The ship foundered in the English Channel off St Mawes, Cornwall, with the loss of one life.
Four Sisters	Great Britain	The ship foundered in Studland Bay.
Gracia Divina	Republic of Venice	The ship was lost in the Isles of Scilly, Great Britain. She was on a voyage from Cádiz, Spain, to London.
Hopewell	Great Britain	The ship was lost near Seaford, Sussex. She was on a voyage from Málaga, Spain, to London.
Joseph	Great Britain	The ship foundered in Studland Bay.
Katherine	Great Britain	The ship foundered off Castlehaven, County Cork, Ireland.
Lydia	Great Britain	The ship foundered in the Atlantic Ocean off the Shetland Islands. She was on a voyage from South Carolina, British America, to Hamburg.
Morning Star	Great Britain	The ship was driven ashore and wrecked near Portsmouth, Hampshire. She was on a voyage from London to South Carolina, British America.
Nelly	Great Britain	The ship foundered in the Atlantic Ocean. She was on a voyage from Virginia, British America, to Liverpool, Lancashire.
Princess of Wales	Great Britain	The ship was lost near Constadt. She was on a voyage from London to Saint Petersburg.
Queen of Sheba	Great Britain	The ship foundered in the Atlantic Ocean 70 leagues (210 nautical miles (390 km)) west of The Lizard, Cornwall. Her crew were rescued by Mary (Great Britain). She was on a voyage from London to New York, British America.
Shaftesbury	Great Britain	The cutter came ashore near Porthleaven whilst pursuing Bell (Great Britain).
Santa Bueno	Spain	The ship was driven ashore and wrecked at Agamonte.
St. George	Great Britain	The ship foundered in the English Channel off Brighthelmston, Sussex. She was on a voyage from Dénia, Spain, to London.
Unity	Great Britain	The ship foundered in the Atlantic Ocean. Her crew were rescued by Mears (Great Britain).
Venus	flag unknown	The ship foundered in The Downs. Her crew were rescued.
William & Mary	Great Britain	The ship sank at Dublin, Ireland.

== November ==
=== 1 November ===
List of shipwrecks: 1 November 1758
Ship	State	Description
Tartar	Great Britain	The ship was driven ashore and wrecked west of the Mull of Kintyre. She was on a voyage from New York to Liverpool, Lancashire.

=== 8 November ===
List of shipwrecks: 8 November 1758
Ship	State	Description
Jonas	Sweden	The ship, a prize of the privateer Salisbury (Great Britain), was wrecked 8 nautical miles (15 km) from Wexford, Ireland.

=== 19 November ===
List of shipwrecks: 19 November 1758
Ship	State	Description
Anne	Great Britain	The ship ran aground near Milford, Pembrokeshire, with the loss of two lives. She was on a voyage from Cork, Ireland, to Bristol, Gloucestershire.

=== 20 November ===
List of shipwrecks: 20 November 1758
Ship	State	Description
Friendship	Great Britain	The ship was wrecked in The Burlings. She was on a voyage from London to Seville, Spain.

=== 28 November ===
List of shipwrecks: 28 November 1758
Ship	State	Description
HMS Lichfield	(Kingdom of Great Britain) Royal Navy	HMS Lichfield. The fourth rate was wrecked on the Barbary Coast with the loss of about 130 of her 350 crew. Survivors were captured and held as slaves until ransomed in April 1760.

=== Unknown date ===
List of shipwrecks: Unknown date in November 1758
Ship	State	Description
Betty	Great Britain	The ship was lost near Waterford, Ireland. She was on a voyage from Glasgow, Renfrewshire, to Jamaica.
Chance	Great Britain	The ship was driven ashore and wrecked at Wick, Caithness. She was on a voyage from Christiansand, Norway, to the Moray Firth.
Christopher	France	The ship was lost on Spanish Island, County Cork, Ireland.
Eliza & Antonia	Spain	The ship was lost near Lyme, Dorset, Great Britain. She was on a voyage from the Canary Islands to Hamburg.
Fortune	Denmark	The ship was lost near Ventava, Duchy of Courland and Semigallia. She was on a voyage from Copenhagen to Riga, Russia.
Friendship	Great Britain	The ship foundered in the North Sea. Her crew were rescued. She was on a voyage from the Firth of Forth to Middlesbrough, Yorkshire.
Huntingdon	Great Britain	The ship was wrecked on Spanish Island with the loss of a crew member. She was on a voyage from Venice and Zant, Kari-Eli to London.
Isaac	Great Britain	The ship was lost near Sligo, Ireland.
Italian Merchant	Great Britain	The ship was lost near Riga, Russia.
Magdalen	Great Britain	The ship foundered in the North Sea. She was on a voyage from Aberdeen to Newcastle upon Tyne, Northumberland.
Mary	Great Britain	The ship was lost in the Baltic Sea. She was on a voyage from Saint Petersburg, Russia, to London.
Nostra Señora de la Conception	Spain	The ship was lost near Waterford, Ireland, with the loss of two of her crew. She was on a voyage from Dublin, Ireland, to Cádiz.
Nostra Señora de la Guarda	Spain	The ship foundered in the English Channel off Beachy Head, Sussex, Great Britain. She was on a voyage from Cádiz to Havre de Grâce, France.
Robert	Great Britain	The ship was wrecked at "Wessarcoig". She was on a voyage from Leith, Lothian, to Hamburg.
Santa Sebastian	Spain	The ship was lost at Cádiz. She was on a voyage from Cádiz to London.
Santa Vincent	Spain	The ship was wrecked near Porto, Portugal. She was on a voyage from London to Cádiz.
Santissima Anunciata Santa Nicholas san Speridon	Republic of Venice	The ship was wrecked on a rock off Kinsale, County Cork, Ireland. She was on a voyage from Bristol, Gloucestershire, Great Britain, to Venice.
Sincere Friend	Great Britain	The ship foundered whilst on a voyage from Saint Petersburg, Russia, to London. Her crew were rescued.
York	Great Britain	The ship capsized at Bristol, Gloucestershire.
York	Great Britain	The ship was lost near Limerick, Ireland. Her crew were rescued.

== December ==
=== 11 December ===
List of shipwrecks: 11 December 1758
Ship	State	Description
Young Peter	Hamburg	The ship was driven ashore and wrecked at Dungeness, Kent, Great Britain, with the loss of nine lives. She was on a voyage from Bordeaux, France, to Hamburg.

=== 12 December ===
List of shipwrecks: 12 December 1758
Ship	State	Description
Violet	Great Britain	The transport ship sprang a leak and foundered in the Atlantic Ocean with the loss of all on board.

=== 13 December ===
List of shipwrecks: 13 December 1758
Ship	State	Description
Duke William	Great Britain	The transport ship foundered in the Atlantic Ocean 20 leagues (60 nautical miles (110 km)) off the coast of France with the loss of over 360 lives.

=== 16 December ===
List of shipwrecks: 16 December 1758
Ship	State	Description
Ruby	Great Britain	The transport ship struck rocks and sank off the Azores, Portugal, with the loss of 116 of the 259 people on board.

=== Unknown date ===
List of shipwrecks: Unknown in December date 1758
Ship	State	Description
Beauford	Great Britain	The ship was wrecked at Gourock, Renfrewshire. She was on a voyage from Glasgow, Renfrewshire, to Saint Kitts.
Betty	Sweden	The ship was lost near Londonderry, Ireland.
Castleton	Great Britain	The ship ran aground at Dunmore, County Galway, Ireland. She was on a voyage from Lancaster, Lancashire, to Barbados.
Charles	Great Britain	The ship was lost at Carlscroon, Sweden. She was on a voyage from Riga, Russia, to Leith, Lothian.
Constantine	Danzig	The ship was lost whilst on a voyage from Hull, Yorkshire, Great Britain, to Danzig.
Fortune	Ireland	The ship was driven ashore and wrecked in the Bristol Channel. Her crew were rescued.
Gottenburg	Sweden	The ship was destroyed by fire in The Downs. Her crew were rescued.
Nancy	Great Britain	The ship was driven ashore and wrecked near Lindisfarne, Northumberland. She was on a voyage from Sunderland, County Durham, to Aberdeen.
Nancy	Great Britain	The ship foundered in the Atlantic Ocean. Her crew were rescued by Black Prince (Great Britain). She was on a voyage from Jamaica to Bristol.
Nossa Senhora de Porto Santo António	Portugal	The ship was wrecked on the coast of Galicia, Spain. She was on a voyage from Lisbon to Havre de Grâce, France.
Onacabesla	Great Britain	The ship foundered in the Atlantic Ocean 300 leagues (900 nautical miles (1,700 km)) west of The Lizard, Cornwall. Her crew were rescued. She was on a voyage from Jamaica to London.
Oswego	Great Britain	The ship was lost off Youghal, County Cork, Ireland. She was on a voyage from Bristol, Gloucestershire, to New York, British America.
Pembroke	Great Britain	The ship foundered off Robert's Cove, County Cork, with the loss of twelve of her crew. She was on a voyage from Bristol to New York.
Rising Sun	Great Britain	The ship was lost at Carlscroon. She was on a voyage from Riga to London.
Robert	Ireland	The ship capsized near Dublin and was wrecked. She was on a voyage from Dublin to Antigua.
Scipio	Great Britain	The ship foundered in the Atlantic Ocean off the Isles of Scilly with the loss of all hands. She was on a voyage from Jamaica to London.

== Unknown date ==
List of shipwrecks: Unknown date in 1758
Ship	State	Description
Adventure	Great Britain	The ship foundered in the Atlantic Ocean. Her crew were rescued by Lord Howe (Great Britain). She was on a voyage from Jamaica to London.
Anton	Great Britain	The whaler was sunk by ice off the coast of Greenland. Some of her crew were rescued by Golden Lyon (Great Britain).
Britannia	Great Britain	The ship ran aground and sank at Bermuda. She was on a voyage from Bermuda to London.
Caesar	Spain	The ship was lost on "Annagabes Island". Her crew were rescued. She was on a voyage from Cuba to Spain.
Duke Compagni	Dutch Republic	The ship was lost off St. Eustatius. She was on a voyage from St. Eustatius to Amsterdam.
Duke of Cumberland	Great Britain	The ship was lost at Louisbourg, Nova Scotia, French America.
Friendship	Great Britain	The ship was lost on the coast of South Carolina, British America. Her crew were rescued.
Goulan	Great Britain	The ship was lost at Louisbourg.
Land Tortoise	(Kingdom of Great Britain) Royal Navy	French and Indian Wars: The radeau was scuttled in Lake George, New York, British America, with the intention of raising her the following year.
Lion	Great Britain	The ship was wrecked on Blanco Island, Cuba. Her crew were rescued. She was on a voyage from Jamaica to Bristol, Gloucestershire.
Mars	Great Britain	The frigate foundered in the Atlantic Ocean with the loss of 34 of her 105 crew. Survivors were rescued by Anna (Great Britain). She was on a voyage from Bristol to Philadelphia, Pennsylvania, British America.
Mary & Jane	(Kingdom of Great Britain) British America	The ship was lost at Jamaica. She was on a voyage from Virginia to Jamaica.
Mercury	Great Britain	The ship was wrecked on the coast of Cuba. She was on a voyage from Jamaica to Bristol.
Peggy	(Kingdom of Great Britain) British America	The ship was lost off the coast of North Carolina. She was on a voyage from Philadelphia, Pennsylvania, to a port in South Carolina.
Phenix	Great Britain	The ship was wrecked in Casco Bay. She was on a voyage from London to Boston, Massachusetts, British America.
Princess Amelia	Great Britain	The ship foundered in the Atlantic Ocean off Cape Hatteras, South Carolina, British America. She was on a voyage from Halifax, Nova Scotia, British America, to a port in South Carolina.
Princess Carolina	Great Britain	The ship was lost near Venice with the loss of eight of her crew.
Ranger	Great Britain	The ship foundered in the Atlantic Ocean. Her crew were rescued. She was on a voyage from the Piscataqua River to Jamaica.
Ross	Great Britain	The ship was lost on the coast of New England. She was on a voyage from London to Boston, Massachusetts.
Unity	Great Britain	The ship was destroyed by fire in a port in Maryland, British America.
