= Noel, Nova Scotia =

Community in Nova Scotia, Canada

Noel
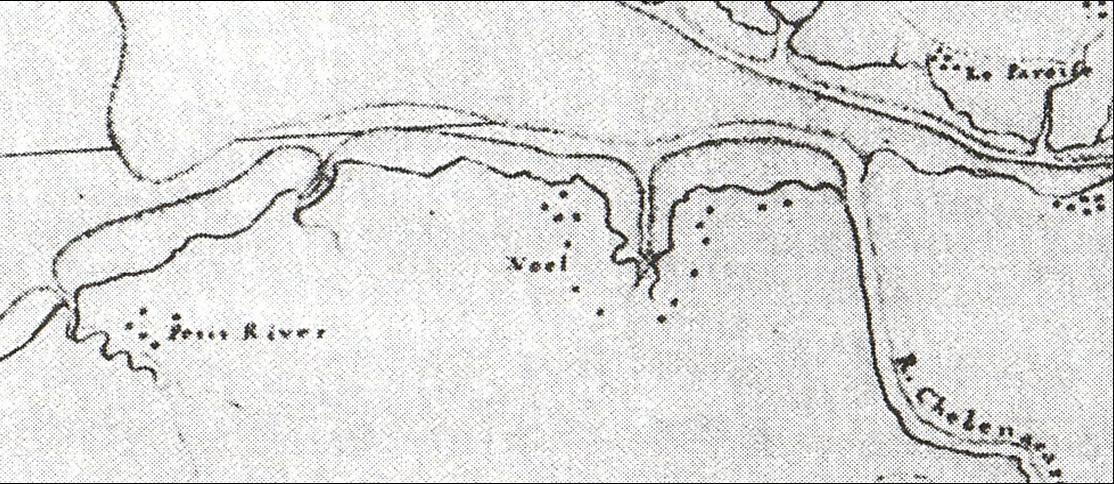
- Map of Noel, Nova Scotia (1756)

- Location in Nova Scotia
- Coordinates: 45°17′44″N 63°44′54″W
- Country: Canada
- Province: Nova Scotia
- County: Hants County
- Municipality: East Hants Municipality
- Elevation: 10–110 m (33–361 ft)
- Time zone: UTC-4 (AST)
  - Summer (DST): UTC-3 (ADT)
- Canadian Postal Code: B0N
- Area code: 902
- Telephone Exchange: 883
- NTS Map: 011E05
- GNBC Code: CBBPS

Noel is an unincorporated community in the Canadian province of Nova Scotia, located in East Hants Municipality in Hants County. The community is named after its most prominent resident Noël Doiron and was known for shipbuilding in the nineteenth century. Noel Doiron is the namesake of the village as well as the surrounding communities of Noel Shore, East Noel, Noel Road, and North Noal Road. The earliest recorded reference to the community of "Noel" was by surveyor Charles Morris in 1752. Prior to that date, the area is referred to as "Trejeptick", which first appears in the Colonial Office minutes of Annapolis Royal in 1734. Noel was also the home of the Osmond O'Brien Shipyard.

== History ==
=== Acadians ===
The community of Noel was named Trejeptick by the Mi'kmaq which is believed to mean "worn rocks" after the eroded sandstone cliffs and sea stacks. The Acadian Noël Doiron settled in the community around 1710 with his family and lived there for forty years, leading English surveyors who first mapped the village to name it after him. During that time Noel Doiron and others in the Noel Bay built a chapel at Burntcoat, eight dwellings and dykes that are still there to this day. During this time, the village of Noel was in the middle of a war zone between New England and New France fighting to maintain control over Acadia. Upon his return from the New France victory in the Battle of Grand Pré (1747), military officer Daniel Liénard de Beaujeu stopped into Noel to tend to his wounded soldiers. Liénard de Beaujeu is the first recorded visitor to the village.

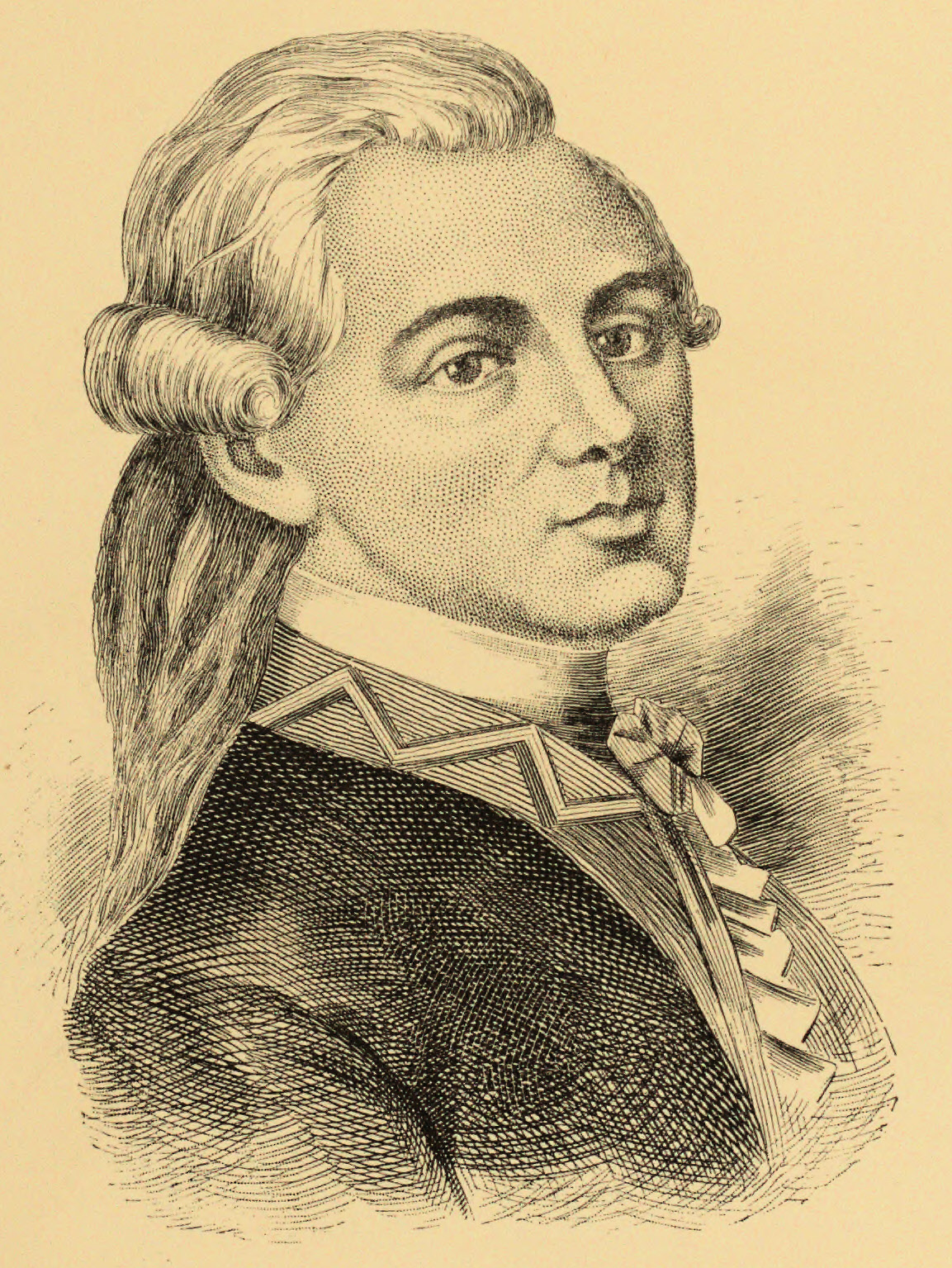
First recorded visitor to Vil Noel (1747): Daniel Liénard de Beaujeu

At the beginning of Father Le Loutre's War, Noel Doiron and many others joined the Acadian Exodus from mainland Nova Scotia to the French colony of Ile St. Jean (i.e., Prince Edward Island). Noel was accompanied by the Acadians in Selma, Nova Scotia and Maitland, Hants County, Nova Scotia. Noel specifically settled Pointe Prime, Ile St. Jean (present day Eldon, Prince Edward Island). However, after the British occupied Ile St Jean following the Siege of Louisbourg in 1758 they deported Noel Doiron and the former Noel residents in the Ile Saint-Jean Campaign of the Expulsion of the Acadians. Their deportation ship the Duke William sank on December 13, 1758 en route to France. At least three hundred and sixty Acadians, including Noel and most of his extended family, perished. The sinking of the Duke William is one of the worst marine disasters in Canadian history (as measured by Canadian lives lost)—see List of disasters in Canada by death toll. According to the Captain of the Duke William, William Nichols, Noel Doiron was "head prisoner" aboard the doomed vessel and was described as the "father of the whole island", a reference to Noel's place of prominence among the Acadian residents of Isle St. Jean (Prince Edward Island). For his "noble resignation" and self-sacrifice aboard the Duke William, Noel was celebrated in popular print throughout the 19th century in England and America.

=== Ulster Scots (Irish) ===
After the exodus of the Acadians from Noel (1750), the land was owned but never settled by Charles Morris. Twenty one years after Noel was vacated by the Acadians, the village was settled by Ulster Scots Timothy O'Brien and his four sons (1771).

=== Shipbuilding ===
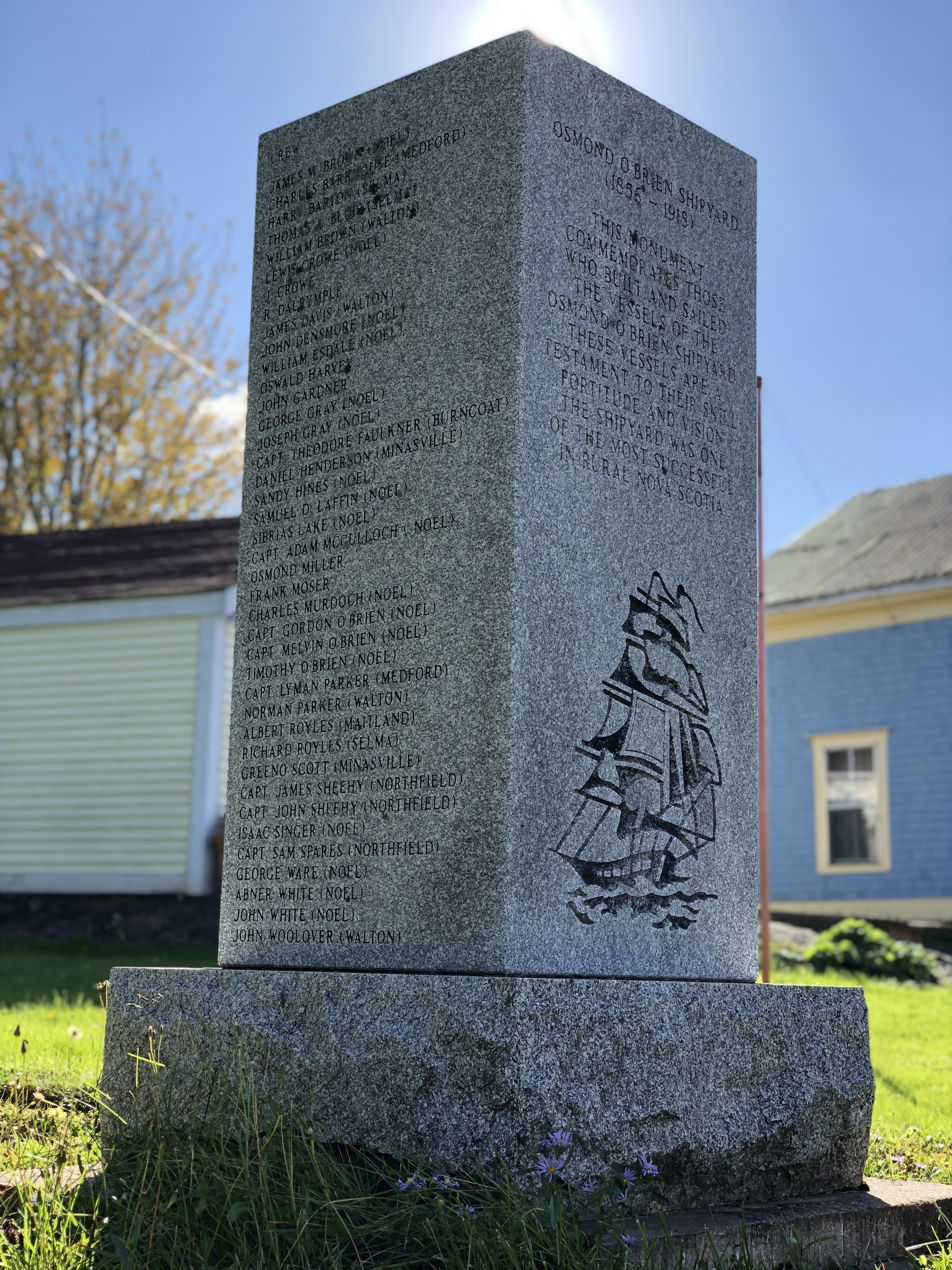
Osmond O'Brien Shipyard Monument, Noel, Nova Scotia

The Noel Bay had many shipyards in the 19th century. The most prominent was the Osmond O'Brien Shipyard. This shipyard produced twenty vessels, the largest being the Amanda, which was sailed out of the bay by Captain William Scott of Minasville, Nova Scotia. The Barque "Noel" was built in the Osmond O'Brien Shipyard and was named after the community.

=== Name ===
The village of Noel is named after Noël Doiron. Prior to the publication of academic scholarship on the namesake of the village of Noel (2008), the origin of the community's name was virtually unknown. The reason for the name's unknown origin was, in part, because the oral history of the community was lost with the Deportation of the Acadians, which left the village vacated for 21 years. The Ulster Scots and their descendants who arrived in the village created folklore that claimed that the village was named "Noel" (the French word for Christmas) because either the Acadians or the Irish first arrived in the village on Christmas day. Such folklore informed The Chronicle Herald headline on December 14, 1965: "Village of Noel has Direct Association with Christmas". This folklore has also been reflected in a recent children’s book by Bruce Nunn and Yolanda Poplawska named Magical Christmas Light of Old Nova Scotia (2003). There is also a special Christmas postmark by Canada Post created for the community (2005). Other scholarship erroneously asserted that the community may have been named after Noel Pinet.

In 1906, Annie Hennigar was among the first female graduates of the Dalhousie School of Medicine. She served the Noel area in her horse and buggy General Practice. There is a painting depicting her encounter with a black bear in the Historical Museum in Selma.

== Notable residents ==
- Noel Doiron
- Annie Hennigar
- Silas McLellan
