= Isle Saint-Jean =

1713–1763 French colony in North America (now Prince Edward Island)

- 1713–1763
- Top: Flag (1663—1715); Bottom: Flag under the House of Bourbon (1534—1689) (Note: The Royal Banner of early modern France or "Bourbon Flag" was the most commonly used flag in New France) Coat of arms of New France (Note: Lesser version of the coat of arms as used by the French Government.)
- Motto: "Montjoie Saint Denis!" (French); "Mountjoy Saint Denis!"
- Map of the colony.
- Status: Colony of France within New France (1535–1758); Under British military occupation (1758–1763)
- Capital: Port-la-Joye
- Official languages: French
- Religion: Catholicism
- Government: Monarchy
- King of France
  - 1534–1547: Francis I (first)
  - 1715–1763: Louis XV (last)
- Viceroy of New France
  - 1534–1541: Jacques Cartier (first; as Governor of New France)
  - 1755–1760: Pierre de Rigaud de Vaudreuil (last)
- History
  - Established: 1713
  - Disestablished: 1763
- Currency: Livre tournois
- Today part of: Canada (Prince Edward Island)

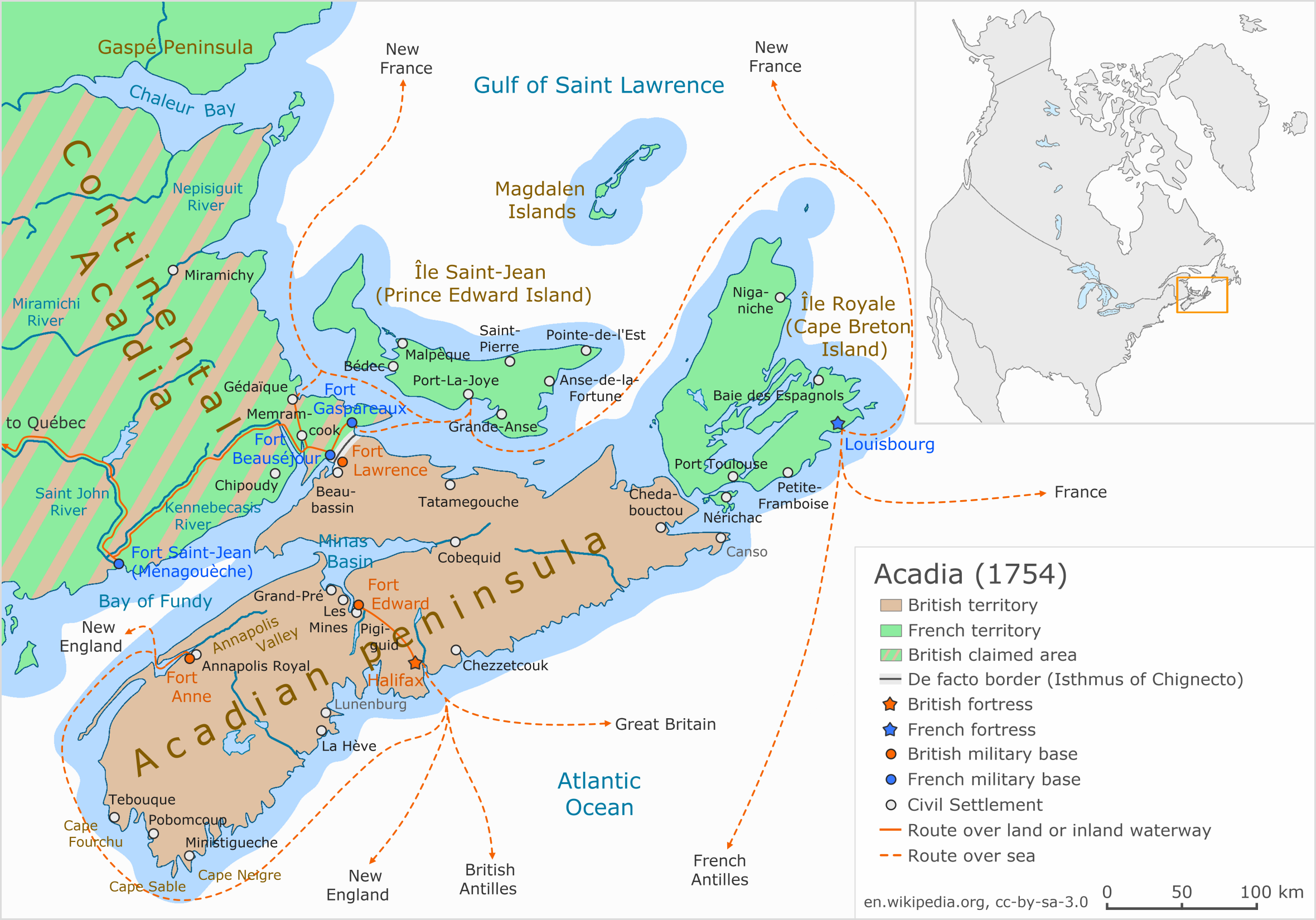
Isle Saint-Jean in 1754.

Isle Saint-Jean or Île Saint-Jean (lit. 'Saint-John Island') was a French colony in North America that existed from 1713 to 1763 on what is today Prince Edward Island as part of the wider colony of Acadia.

== Colony Formation ==
After 1713, France engaged in a reaffirmation of its territory in Maritime North America. Besides the construction of Acadian settlement of Louisbourg on Cape Breton Island, France was resolved to organize a colony on Isle Saint-Jean.

The beginning of the colony was slow, with only 297 inhabitants by 1728. During the years 1740–1750, hundreds of Acadians fled Nova Scotia, which had been conquered by the British in 1713, to exile themselves on this island. The colony population increased to 4,000 inhabitants by 1755.

== Deportation ==
After Louisbourg had fallen to the British on July 26, 1758, during the French and Indian War, the order of deportation was given two weeks later to the Acadians of Isle Saint-Jean, and the Ile Saint-Jean Campaign began. The British authorities had decided to forgo the initiative to assimilate them in the British colonies, and wanted them returned to France. Around 4,600 Acadiens lived on Isle Saint-Jean.

In August 1758, 3,100 inhabitants were captured and deported to France. Others succeeded in hiding or fleeing. Of the twelve ships used to transport the Acadians, three sank; Duke William (364 died), Violet (280 died) and Ruby (213 died). In all, 1,649 Acadians, around 53% of the total number deported, died from drowning or diseases.

In 1763, France ceded the Isle Saint-Jean officially to Great Britain, with the Treaty of Paris.
