= Noël Doiron =

Leader of the Acadians

Noël Doiron (Port-Royal, 1684 – December 13, 1758) was a leader of the Acadians, renowned for his leadership during the Deportation of the Acadians. Doiron was deported on a vessel named the Duke William (1758). The Duke William sank, killing many passengers, in one of the worst marine disasters in Canadian history. The captain of the Duke William, William Nichols, described Noel Doiron as the "father" to all the Acadians on Ile St. Jean (present-day Prince Edward Island) and the "head prisoner" on board the ship.

Second only to Evangeline, the most well-known Acadian story of the Victorian era was that of Noel Doiron. For his "noble resignation" and self-sacrifice aboard the Duke William, Doiron was celebrated in popular print throughout the 19th century in England and America.

Doiron was commemorated in the naming of the village Noel, Nova Scotia, and the surrounding communities of Noel Shore, East Noel, Noel Road and North Noel Road.

== Queen Anne's War ==
Noel Doiron was born at Port Royal, Acadia, but he lived most of his childhood at Pisiquid in the Parish of Sainte Famille (present-day Falmouth, Nova Scotia).

During Queen Anne's War, Doiron was taken as a prisoner of war to Boston by Colonel Benjamin Church. In February 1704, New France orchestrated a raid with Abenaki allies on Deerfield, Massachusetts. During the raid, more than 100 captives were taken back to Montreal, Quebec, including women and children. Some were held for ransom or exchange, and others, usually young women and children, were adopted into local Mohawk families to replace members who had died. One of the prisoners taken was John Williams, the minister of the Deerfield church.

Five months later Church was sent to Acadia to retaliate for the Deerfield raid and to capture prisoners to ransom the release of those taken in Quebec. In June 1704, Church sailed from Boston with 17 vessels and 550 men. He torched Acadian hamlets in an expedition that raided Grand Pré, Pisiguit, and Beaubassin. When Church returned to New England, he boasted that only five dwellings remained in all Acadia. He took 45 prisoners, including Noel Doiron, age 20, and his future wife Marie Henry.

While forcibly removed from their homes, Doiron, Marie and the other Acadian hostages were initially permitted to roam freely in the streets of Boston, much to the dismay of New Englanders. On November 14, 1704, the Massachusetts House of Representatives expressed the opinion that the Acadians in the town were "under little or no restraint, which this House apprehend not safe." The House demanded the hostages be imprisoned at Castle Island, just off the shore of Boston, and Fort Hill. On November 24, 1704, the Boston selectmen appealed to the Governor of Massachusetts "to restrain the French Prisoners from going about the town at their own pleasure, least their so doing may prove hazardous to this town."

The first group of Acadian prisoners were returned to Acadia in 1705. Noel and Marie Doiron were delayed in returning because the New Englanders had refused to release the notorious privateer Pierre Maisonnat dit Baptiste until John Williams was released. After two years in exile, Noel Doiron and the other Acadian prisoners finally returned to Acadia along with Pierre Maisonnat. They arrived at Port Royal on September 18, 1706. Within three days of their arrival, Noel and Marie had their first child baptized at Port Royal. The baby was born while they were imprisoned in Boston. They married soon after the baptism.

=== Life in Vila Noel, Acadia ===
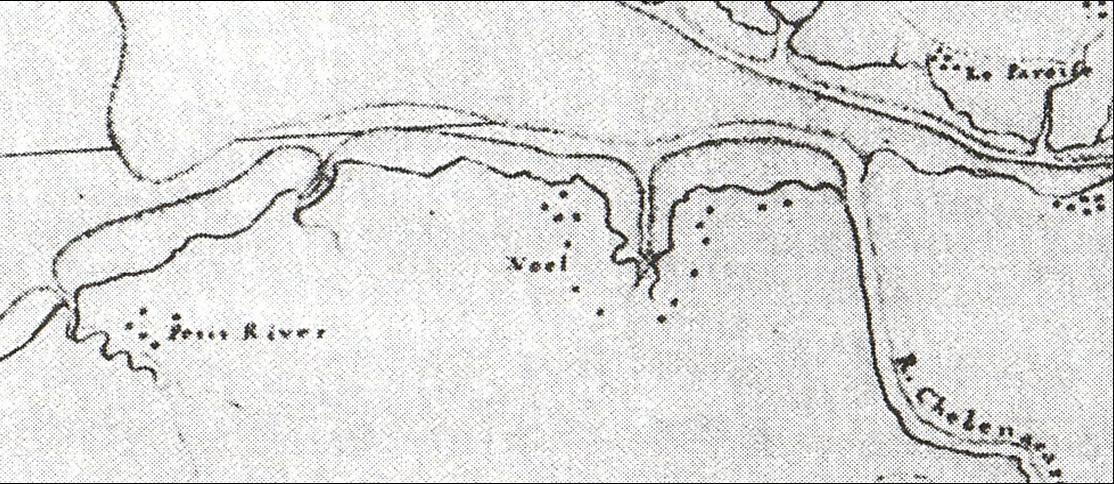
Map of Noel Shore (1756)

By 1714, Doiron and his family were established in what is now known as Noel, Nova Scotia. The Doiron family grew to include five sons and three daughters—one son died in Vila Noel before 1746. The three daughters would marry and leave the village while the surviving sons married and remained with their parents. Doiron lived in the village for 40 years. During that time he and his family built dykes that still exist in the community, as well as a chapel at Burntcoat Head, Nova Scotia (formerly known as Steeple Point). As with most Acadians in the Cobequid region, Doiron was likely a cattle farmer involved in supporting trade with the French Fortress of Louisbourg.

== King George's War ==
During King George's War, Doiron was involved in the aftermath of the Battle of Grand Pré. Wounded French soldiers returning to Chignecto stopped at the village of Noel. Noel's priest cared for them until they continued their journey.

== Father Le Loutre's War ==
Early in Father Le Loutre's War, the British established Halifax in 1749 and built fortifications in all the major Acadian communities. Shortly after, Noel's priest was arrested by the British authorities and taken to Halifax. In response to the war and the British taking control over Acadia, the inhabitants of the parish sent a request for assistance to Acadians residing in Beaubassin.

The message said that British soldiers,

"... came furtively during the night to take our pastor and our four deputies ... [A British officer] read the orders by which he was authorized to seize all the muskets in our houses, thereby reducing us to the condition of the Irish [prohibited from keeping arms]... Thus we see ourselves on the brink of destruction, liable to be captured and transported to the English islands and to lose our religion."

Early in 1750, Doiron and his family joined the Acadian Exodus and left mainland Nova Scotia for Pointe Prime, Ile St. Jean (present day Eldon, Prince Edward Island).

=== Life on Ile St. Jean ===
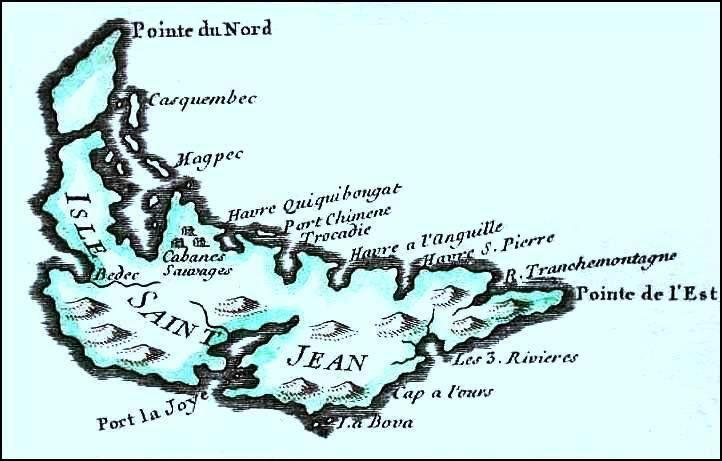
Map of Ile St. Jean, 1784

The Doiron family lived for eight years at Pointe Prime, Ile St. Jean. Life there was difficult. The summer before the Noel Bay settlers arrived, a field mouse infestation had destroyed the crops on the island. The next summer a plague of locusts appeared, and the following summer was accompanied by a blistering drought. The census of 1752 reported: "the greater number amongst them had not even bread to eat ... [many] subsisted on the shell fish they gathered on the shores of the harbour when the tide was out." Food shortages were exacerbated when the French government ordered Acadians to cease fishing and focus exclusively on crop production—crops were required for troops at Louisbourg. Faced with severe food shortages, the officials of Ile St. Jean pleaded for assistance from Louisburg, Quebec, and France.

In 1752, the former residents of the Noel Bay settlement were joined at Pointe Prime by their former priest, Jacques Girard. Two years earlier, in March 1750, when Governor Edward Cornwallis arrested Girard, he confined him to the Governor's home in Halifax. Girard was charged with providing aid to representatives of the French Crown. After giving an oath to Cornwallis that he would never return to the Cobequid, Girard was reassigned to the Piziquid (present-day Windsor, Nova Scotia). He resumed his priestly duties until he was "rescued" by forces loyal to the French Crown and transported to Point Prime on Ile St. Jean.

In a letter dated August 24, 1753, Girard wrote of the plight of the Pointe Prime Acadians:

Our refugees ... this winter will not be in any condition to work, they lack tools, they cannot find shelter from the rigor of the cold by day or night. Most of the children are so naked that they cannot hide it. And when I come into the houses, they are all in the ashes near the fire, they hide and take flight without shoes, without stockings, without shirts and all are not reduced to such extremity but almost all of them are miserable.

On October 27, 1753, Girard wrote that the situation remained unchanged. Despite these deprivations, the inhabitants of Pointe Prime constructed a parish church and a parochial residence at their own expense and labor.

== French and Indian War ==
During the French and Indian War, the expulsion of the Acadians began from mainland Nova Scotia in 1755. Many Acadians fled to Ile Saint Jean, putting further stress on scarce resources. A year later, in 1756, the continued famine on Ile St. Jean prompted the French authorities to relocate several families to Quebec. This year of severe famine also marked the death of a Pointe Prime resident: one of Doiron's daughters-in-law.

In 1758, after the Siege of Louisbourg (1758), the British began the Ile Saint-Jean Campaign to expel the Acadians, including Noel Doiron and his family, from Ile Saint Jean. The British authorities had given up on their earlier attempts to assimilate the Acadians into the American colonies and now wanted them returned directly to France. Approximately 4,600 Acadians lived on Ile St. Jean: a third were deported to France, a third managed to elude the British, and a third died en route to France.

On October 20, 1758, Noel Doiron and most of the other inhabitants from the Noel Bay embarked for passage from Ile St. Jean to France on the Duke William. Captain William Nichols' account of the voyage across the Atlantic notes that the Duke William sprang a leak on the fifth day after leaving for France. The leak was sealed after nine days; however, on December 11 a more serious leak was discovered that threatened to compromise the completion of the voyage. The next day, those aboard the Duke William witnessed the sinking of the transport vessel Violet and the loss of 300 other Acadians who were on board.

On December 13, two vessels approached the Duke William. Believing help had arrived, all assumed their ordeal had concluded. It was stated in one report, that upon seeing the approaching vessels, Noel Doiron gripped the Captain "in his aged arms and cried for joy." The two vessels, however, refused to provide assistance and continued on their way. According to Nichols, Doiron again embraced the captain and requested that he, the captain, "... and his people [the crew] ... endeavor to save their own lives in their boats, and leave them [the Acadians] to their fate, as it was impossible the boats could carry all." Two lifeboats were on board and these were lowered into the North Atlantic carrying only the captain, his crew, and the parish priest.

Captain Nichols later recorded that during the departure Doiron reprimanded a fellow Acadian for trying to board a lifeboat while abandoning his wife and children. Captain Nichols records Doiron's final encounter with his priest Girard: "the priest went and gave his people his benediction: then, after saluting the old gentleman [Noel Doiron], he tucked up his canonical robes, and went in the boat." The captain reported that Doiron and the other Acadians "in their last moments ... behaved with the greatest fortitude." The Captain recorded that he and Doiron took "... leave of each other with tears in their eyes, and the captain requested that his people keep the boats near the ship, which he was determined not to quit himself until it was dark."

Doiron's priest Girard wrote that he "laid off the ship about half an hour, when their cries, and waving us to be gone, almost broke our hearts." The Duke William drifted, according to Girard, "till it fell calm, and as [it] went down her decks blew up. The noise was like the explosion of a gun, or a loud clap of thunder." The Duke William sank about 20 leagues from the coast of France in the English Channel shortly after 4:00 p.m. on December 13, 1758. Noel Doiron died on board along with his wife, Marie, five of their children with their spouses and over thirty grandchildren.

== Commemorations ==
On 28 January 2019, Temma Frecker, a Nova Scotia teacher at The Booker School, was awarded the Governor General's History Award for her class' proposal to build a statue of Doiron in Cornwallis Park. Her proposal was to include the existing Edward Cornwallis statue among three other statues of Acadian Noël Doiron, Black Nova Scotian Viola Desmond and Mi'kmaq Chief John Denny Jr. The four statutes would be positioned as if in a conversation with each other, discussing their accomplishments and struggles.

- John Frost, "The Book of Good Examples Drawn from History and Biography", New York: 1846, p. 65;
- "The Saturday Magazine (magazine)" (1821), p. 502;
- Barrington's Remarkable Voyages and Ship Wrecks 1880
- Reuben Percy and Sholto Percy, Percy's Anecdotes, London (1868), p. 425.
- London Magazine or Gentleman's Monthly Intelligencer, 1758
