= Radeau =

Radeau may refer to:

== Ships ==
- Radeau (ship), type of ship used in the early United States, mainly as a naval battle platform
- The Radeau Land Tortoise (shipwreck), shipwreck found at Lake George (New York)

== Arts ==
- Le Radeau de la Méduse, 1994 French film by Iradj Azimi
- The Raft of the Medusa, 1818–19 painting by French painter Théodore Géricault
