= Eldon, Prince Edward Island =

Community in Queens County, Prince Edward Island, Canada

Coordinates: 46°5′36.5″N 62°53′12.38″W

Eldon in Prince Edward Island

Eldon is a community in Queens County, Prince Edward Island, Canada. Eldon is southeast of Charlottetown in the township of Lot 57.

== History ==
The Acadians arrived in Pointe Prime, Ile St. Jean (present day Eldon, PEI) in 1750. According to the 1752 census, Noel Doiron's family and many others arrived from the community of Noel, Nova Scotia to escape hostilities after the establishment of Halifax (1749), which sparked Father Le Loutre's War. They built a church and several dwellings in the area during the eight years they were in the village.

The whole community of Acadians died during the French and Indian War in the Ile Saint-Jean Campaign (1758). They were deported on the Duke William, which sank in the English channel. The sinking of the Duke William was one of the worst marine disaster in Canadian history (as measured by Canadian lives lost).
