= Hennigar =

Hennigar is a surname. Notable people with the surname include:

- Annie Hennigar (1873–1950), Canadian physician
- Karen Hennigar (born 1953), Canadian curler
- Rob Hennigar (born 1983), Canadian ice hockey player and coach

== See also ==
- 14164 Hennigar, main-belt asteroid
- Hennigan
