= East Noel, Nova Scotia =

Community in Nova Scotia, Canada

East Noel
- Location in Nova Scotia
- Coordinates: 45°18′14″N 63°42′11″W
- Country: Canada
- Province: Nova Scotia
- County: Hants County
- Municipality: East Hants Municipality
- Elevation: 10–60 m (33–197 ft)
- Time zone: UTC-4 (AST)
  - Summer (DST): UTC-3 (ADT)
- Canadian Postal Code: B0N
- Area code: 902
- Telephone Exchange: 883
- NTS Map: 011E05
- GNBC Code: CAKUW

East Noel is an unincorporated community in the Canadian province of Nova Scotia, located in East Hants Municipality in Hants County. The community is sometimes referred to as Densmores Mills, a locality within East Noel.

== History ==
=== Acadians ===
East Noel may have been Vil Robere - first settled by the Robert Henry family. Dwellings marked on contemporaneous maps suggest that the village around the Noel Bay was much larger than any other along the shore. These maps suggest that around the Noel Bay there may have been two villages - Vil Noel to the west and Vil Robere to the east in present-day East Noel. The fact that Vil Robere was the first village established might lend itself to the strong possibility that Noel Doiron would likely have joined his brother-in-law in the Noel Bay, which also suggests that Vil Robere is East Noel.

Alternatively, there is evidence to suggest that Vil Robere is Selma, Nova Scotia.

=== Ulster Scots (Irish) ===
After the exodus of the Acadians, Francis Densmore was the first to settle the community on the east side of the Noel Bay twenty two years later (1772). The year prior, Timothy O'Brien has begun to settle the west side of the Noel Bay, now known as Noel. Francis and his wife Sarah had the following inscription written on their tombstone in East Noel: "Frank and Sarah were the first settlers of this place."
