= Violet (ship) =

Violet was a ship used to deport Acadians from Île Saint-Jean (now Prince Edward Island) to France, as part of the Île Saint-Jean Campaign during the Seven Years' War. The ship sank in the North Atlantic on 12 December 1758, with the loss of 280–400 lives.

Violet was a ship of 315 tons and 8 cannons, under command of Captain Benjamin Suggit. Together with Duke William, John, Samuel, Neptune, Ruby, Yarmouth and another unknown ship, Violet was part of a fleet that left on 25 November from Port-LaJoye, Île Saint-Jean (now Prince Edward Island) for France. On board Violet were some 360 Acadian civilians.

A few days later, the fleet encountered a storm that dispersed the ships. Stormy weather continued for several weeks. On 10 December Duke William caught sight of Violet, and discovered that she was in difficulties, taking in water fast. Captain Suggit, upon re-establishing contact with Duke William, notified Captain Nichols that Violet's pumps were clogged, and that they might sink before morning. Duke William set her three pumps aside as a precaution, but were unable to assist as she herself sprang a leak at 4 the next morning. Violet sank two days later, following a violent squall that lasted ten minutes, with all hands lost.

According to historian Earle Lockerby, 90 passengers had already died before from the appalling conditions on board. In the following days, Duke William and Ruby also foundered with great loss of life.
