= Osmond O'Brien Shipyard =

Shipyard in Noel, Nova Scotia, Canada

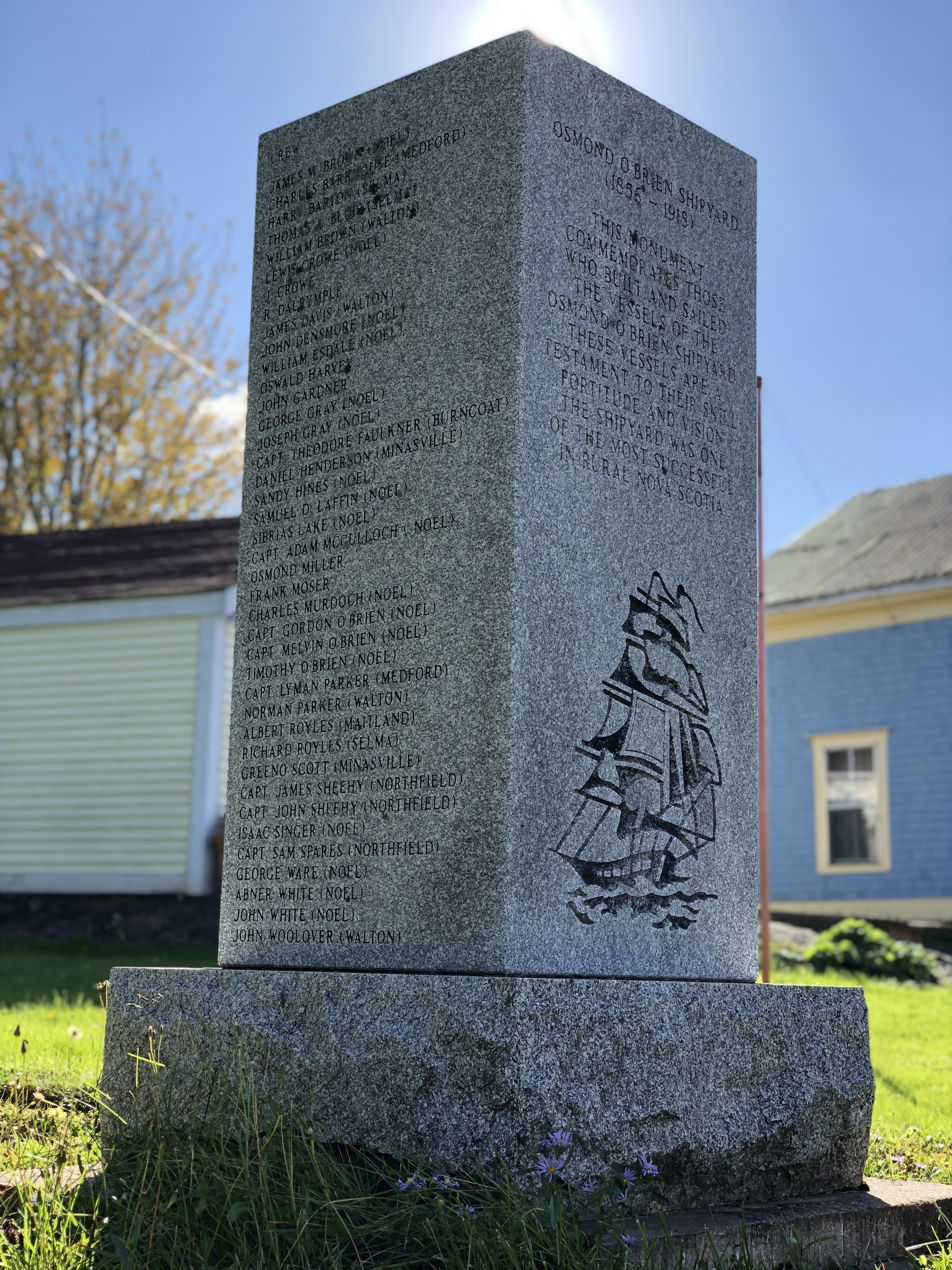
Osmond O'Brien Shipyard Monument, Noel, Nova Scotia

The Osmond O’Brien Shipyard built vessels from 1856 until 1918 in Noel, Nova Scotia. Having produced 20 wooden ships, the shipyard was one of the most successful rural shipyards in Atlantic Canada. The most prominent ship captain of the shipyard was Captain William Scott, who became known as the Mariner of Minasville, after which a film short was made. The most successful ships were the Piskataque (built 1872) and the Amanda (built 1883). Sixteen years after the Schooner Hibernia was built, the last ship - the J. Miller - was built during the brief wooden ship revival of World War I (1918). A monument was erected in Noel, Nova Scotia to the shipyard and the builders and crew members associated with the shipyard in 2005.

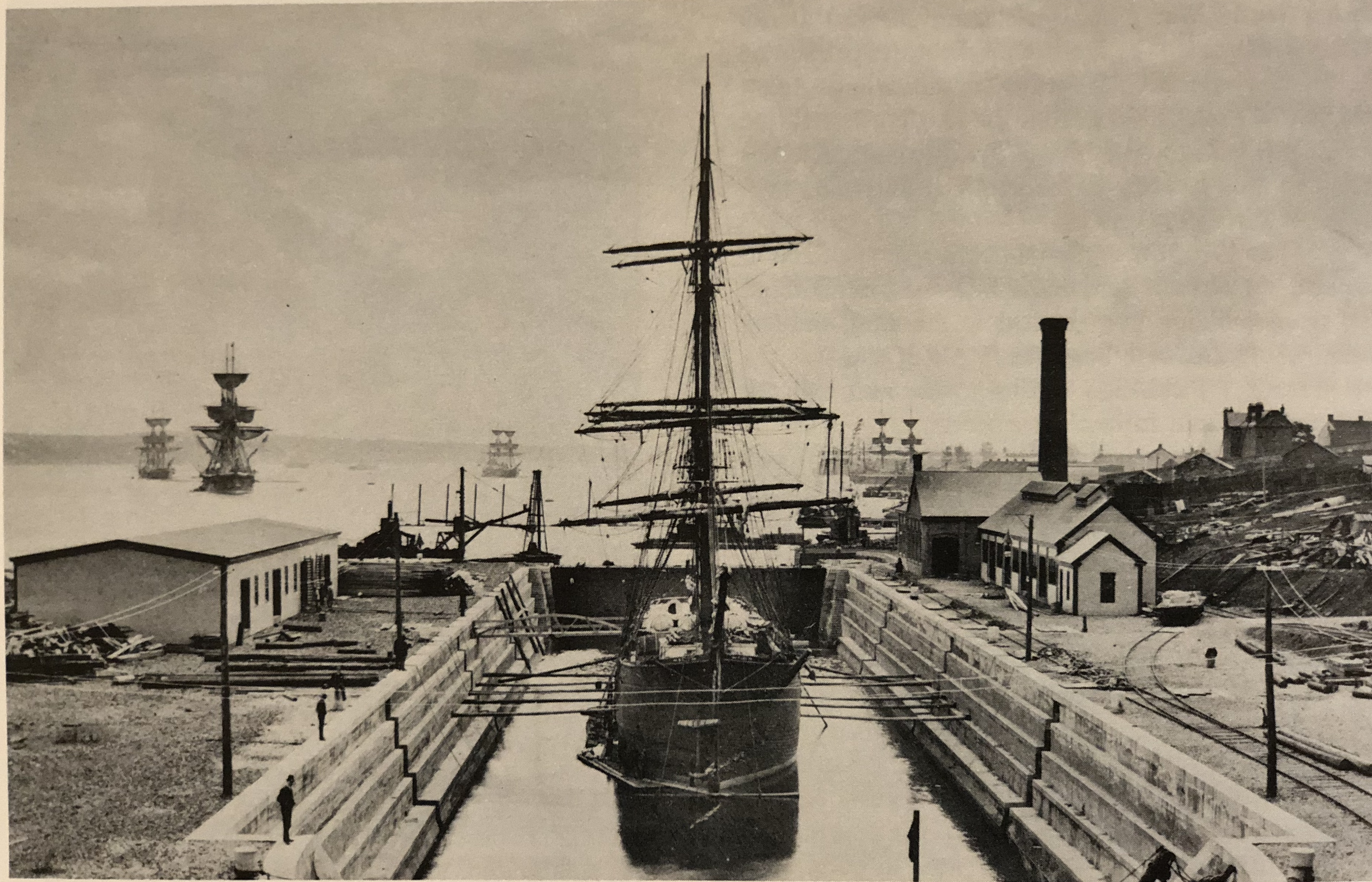
Barque Noel, Halifax Graving Yard, Halifax, Nova Scotia, 1890, Barque made in the Osmond O'Brien Shipyard, Noel, Nova Scotia
