= Annie Hennigar =

Canadian physician (1873–1950)

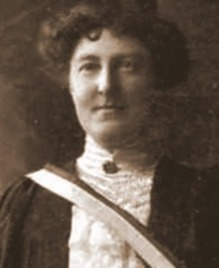
- Hennigar in 1906
- Born: Annie Norman Hennigar; July 9, 1873; Noel, Nova Scotia, Canada
- Died: August 9, 1950 (aged 77)
- Burial place: Burntcoat Cemetery
- Occupation: Physician

Annie Norman Hennigar (9 July 1873 – 9 August 1950) was a Canadian physician from Nova Scotia. Born in Noel, she was among the first female graduates of the Dalhousie University school of medicine in 1906. After graduating, she purchased a horse and buggy and became the first travelling female physician in the Maritimes. She returned to Noel in 1920 and continued practicing medicine until her death at the age of 77.

== Early life and education ==
Annie Hennigar was born on 9 July 1873 in Noel, Nova Scotia, to parents David and Martha Ann Hennigar (née Faulkner). She attended the village school as a child and later became a schoolteacher there before going to medical school. Graduating from Dalhousie University's school of medicine in 1906, she was among the first female graduates of the school.

== Career ==
After graduating from Dalhousie, Hennigar purchased a horse and buggy and worked as a travelling country doctor, becoming the first woman in the Maritime provinces to do so. Recalling her days as a travelling doctor, she wrote to Dr. Roberta Bond Nichols in 1925: "my 'horse and buggy' days were full to overflowing with hardships, thrills, danger, determination and profit. In looking back, I would not have missed that period for a cool million."

Hennigar returned to Noel in 1920 and practiced medicine for 30 years in Noel and Maitland. She took an interest in young women studying medicine, encouraging them to "get out in the country where you are so urgently needed, especially if you are not afraid of work and enjoy an outdoor life." Hennigar married her husband, Frank Northup Sanford, on 10 March 1920. They had no children. She died on 9 August 1950 at the age of 77, after 45 years as a physician. She is buried at Burntcoat Cemetery.

== Painting ==
Hennigar was an accomplished artist. She was a member of the American Physicians Art Association and received their Award of Merit in 1946 for her painting Courage. The painting depicts Hennigar and her horse encountering two bears on a country road.
