= Port-LaJoye =

Coordinates: 46.195°N 63.140°W

Port-LaJoye was founded in 1720 on Île Saint-Jean, now Prince Edward Island. Settlement in the area began with the arrival of an expedition sent by the Comte de Saint-Pierre, who settled West of the Harbour entrance to the site named Port-LaJoye. Port-LaJoye became the administrative centre, although other sites had greater commercial potential. The British confirm this decision when they became masters of the region after the capitulation of Louisbourg in 1758.

== History ==
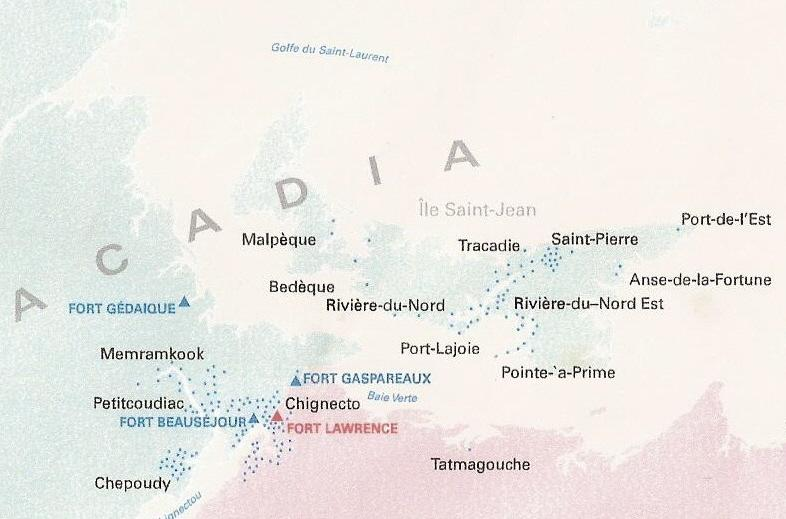
Port-LaJoye in 1750

The first European settlers in the area were French military personnel from Fortress Louisbourg who founded a settlement in 1720 named Port-LaJoye on the southwestern part of the harbour opposite the present-day city of Charlottetown. This settlement effort was led by Michel Haché-Gallant, who used his sloop to transport Acadian settlers from Louisbourg on Île Royal.

=== Initial families ===
Families who came to Port-LaJoye in 1720, were the family of Michel Haché-Gallant of Beaubassin, and the family Pierre and Joseph Martine from Pisiguit. In 1721, Charles Haché-Gallant and his brother Pierre, settled also in Port-LaJoye. In 1722, Jean-Baptiste Haché-Gallant, settled in the Port. In 1724, Joseph Haché-Gallant and Joseph Précieux established themselves. In 1726, Pierre Martin and his son settled on the River to the Northeast. In 1728, Michel Hébert and Pierre Buot moved in turn to the Port. The reason for Acadian emigration to Isle Saint-Jean at that time, was caused by the difficulty that Acadians faced to get new land in Nova Scotia, while their families increased in size.

=== Establishment ===
Acadian settlers established farms in the surrounding area while under French control from 1720–1745 and 1746–1758 and the French military established a small military force at the outpost, garrisoned with troops from Louisbourg. Morale was low and troops were infrequently relieved due to its unpopularity. The wood barracks were poor protection from harsh winters when wind, rain and snow swirled between picket walls and rotten planked roofs.

=== English control and abandonment ===
After 1758, Port-LaJoye was renamed Fort Amherst by the English, and its defences were strengthened. In 1768, the surveyor Charles Morris, designed a new urban site across the harbour. This village is named Charlottetown in honor of Charlotte, wife of King George III. After this, Port-LaJoye fell into oblivion because the inhabitants had been deported.

== See also ==
- Isle Saint-Jean
