= Burntcoat, Nova Scotia =

Community in Nova Scotia, Canada

Burntcoat
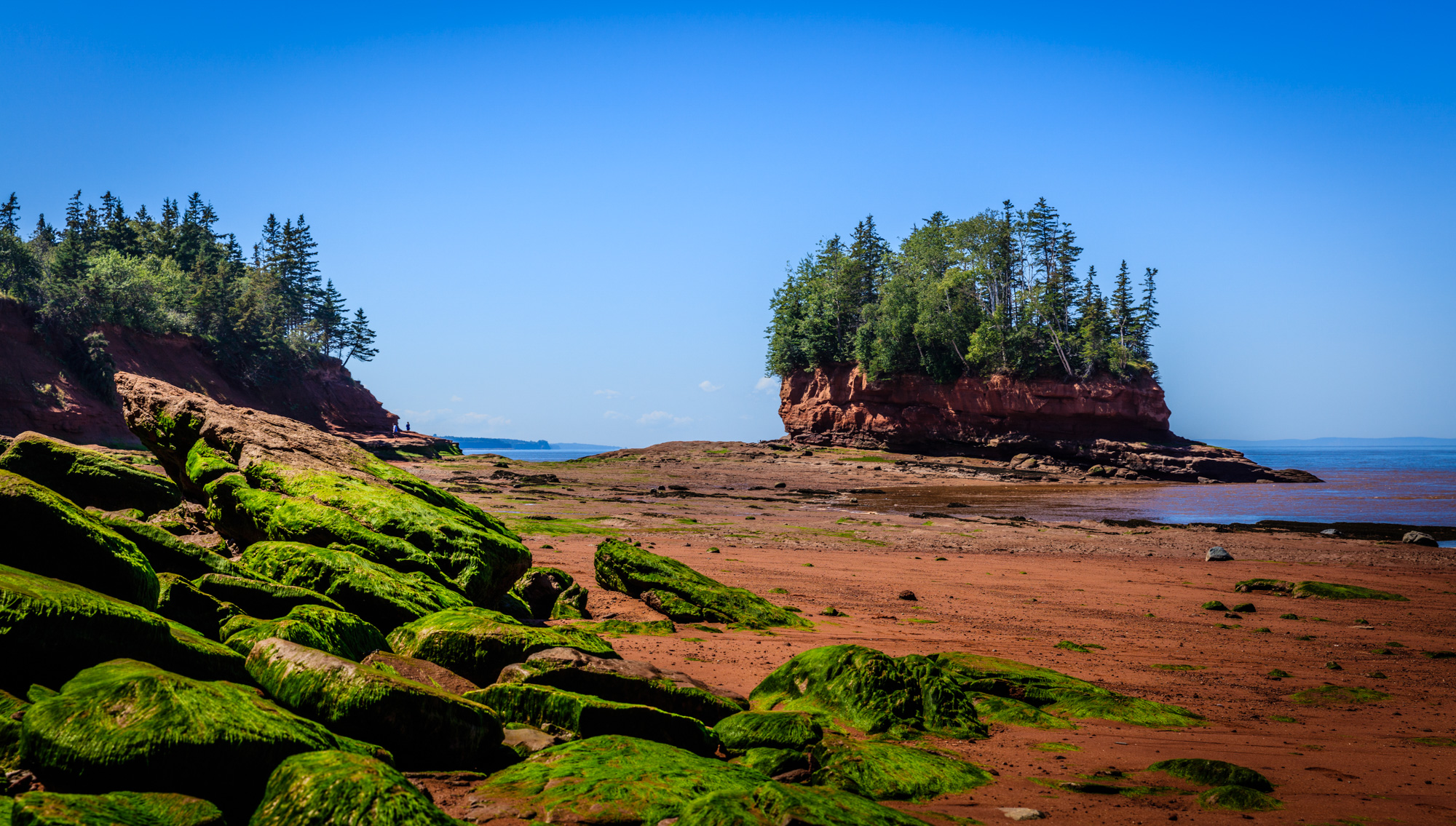
- Burntcoat Head Park

- Location within Nova Scotia
- Coordinates: 45°18′43″N 63°47′25″W
- Country: Canada
- Province: Nova Scotia
- Municipality: East Hants Municipality
- District: 5

Government
  - Type: Regional Council
  - Governing body: Municipal Council of East Hants
- Highest elevation: 60 m (200 ft)
- Lowest elevation: 0 m (0 ft)
- Time zone: UTC-4 (AST)
  - Summer (DST): UTC-3 (ADT)
- Postal code: B0N 1T0
- Area code: 902
- GNBC Code: CAFNI
- Highways: Route 215
- Website: www.burntcoatheadpark.ca
- Part of a series about Places in Nova Scotia

Burntcoat (improperly known as Burncoat) is an unincorporated rural Canadian community in Hants County, Nova Scotia. The area is well known for its cape of Burntcoat Head, the location of the largest recorded tidal range (the greatest difference in height between high tide and low tide) of anywhere in the world. It is also home to Burntcoat Head Park, which offers public access to the ocean floor.

== Etymology ==
The origin of the name "Burntcoat" or "Burncoat", as the community is sometimes named, is unknown. The derivation of the spelling of the name is also unclear. Today the village on the west side of the Noel Bay is named Burntcoat, however, the Acadians named the village on the east side of the Noel Bay "Pointe Brule" (i.e., Burnt Point or Burnt Coast). Perhaps the Protestant settlers who came after the exodus of the Acadians from the community confused the names for the east and west side of the Noel Bay and thought the west side of the bay was "Pointe Brule".

The Acadian name for west side of Noel Bay (i.e., present day Burntcoat) was "Pointe Cloche", indicating a chapel was likely located on the west side of the bay at Noel, Nova Scotia.

== Tidal range ==
Burntcoat is located in Cobequid Bay, near the eastern end of the Bay of Fundy. Burntcoat Head had a public wharf that has been the location of a tide gauge since the 19th century. The tide gauge at Burntcoat Head was operated by the Canadian Hydrographic Service and has recorded the highest tidal range in the world. Currently, the tidal gauge is no longer in operation. Tides at Burntcoat Head average 55.8 ft (17.0 m), with the highest being set during the 1869 Saxby Gale at 70.9 ft (21.6 m).

The Guinness Book of World Records (1975) declared that Burntcoat had the highest tides in the world:

“The Natural World, Greatest Tides: The greatest tides in the world occur in the Bay of Fundy.... Burntcoat Head in the Minas Basin, Nova Scotia, has the greatest mean spring range with 14.5 metres (47.5 feet) and an extreme range of 16.3 metres (53.5 feet).”

The National Geographic magazine (August 1957) also made a similar assertion: “The famous tides of the Bay of Fundy move with deceptive quiet. Sheltered from the open sea, they ebb and flood to a recorded range unequal in the rest of the world.”

Like many coastal areas around the world, Burntcoat Head experiences two high tides and two low tides each day. The Bay of Fundy fills and empties with approximately 160 billion tonnes of water twice a day. On average it takes 6 hours and 13 minutes between high and low tide. As soon as the tide has reached its lowest or highest point, it will change directions, and either begin to come to shore or flow back out. The timing of the tides changes by approximately by one hour daily.

Spring tides happen twice per month when the Sun, Moon, and Earth are aligned. During this alignment, the tides rise higher than average. Neap tides occur during the first and third quarter moon. During this time the high tide heights are lower than average.

== Ecosystems ==
At low tide the ocean floor becomes exposed, allowing different species and ecosystems to be found along the shoreline and within tide pools. Barnacles, periwinkles, slipper limpets, moon snails, horse mussels, leafy bryozoa, and whelks can commonly be found.

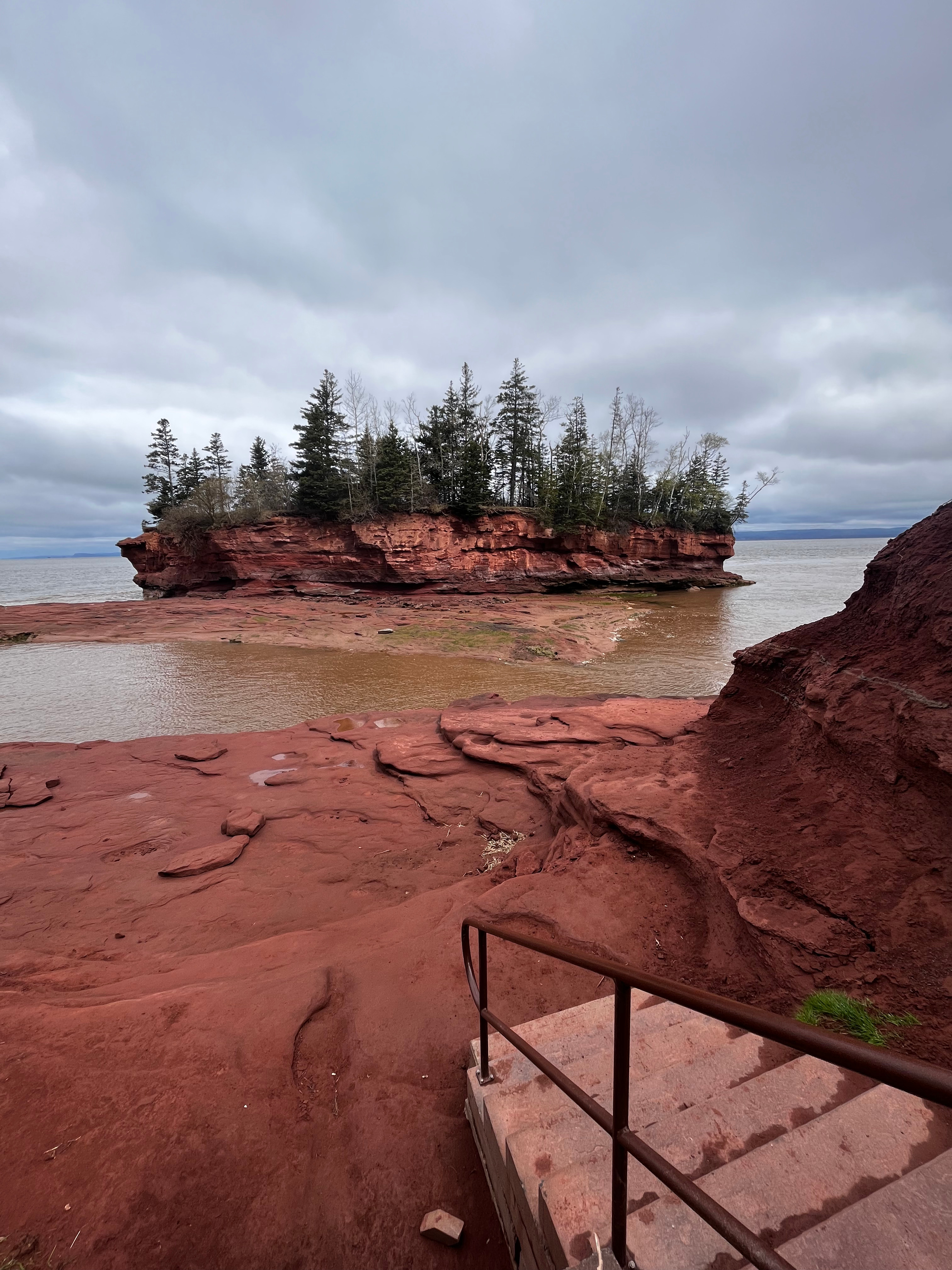
A publicly accessible staircase leads down to the ocean floor at Burntcoat Head Park.

Atlantic mud-piddock (and the similar, but separate False Angel Wing) can be found burrowed into the sandstone. Dead man's fingers and mermaid's glove which are sponges can be found washed up on shore. The five main crab species that can be found within the tidal pools are green crab, hermit crab, lady crab, toad crab, and rock crab. Fish species that are sometimes found in tidal pools include tommy cod, Atlantic mackerel, smallmouth bass, eels, monkfish, and flounder.

Burntcoat Head is a popular location for migrating shorebirds, which include sandpipers, whimbrels, yellowlegs, willets, and plovers. During low tide when mud flats are exposed the birds will consume mud shrimps before heading south for the winter months.

The intertidal area of Burntcoat Head's shoreline is identified as a Critical Habitat for the Atlantic Mud-Piddock (Barnea truncata). The Atlantic Mud-piddock was listed as threatened under the Species at Risk Act (SARA) in 2017. It is a species of bivalve mollusk that burrows exclusively into red mudstone in the intertidal zone of the Minas Basin. To help reduce human impact on this habitat, visitors to Burntcoat Head Park will notice signage and directives to help avoid disturbing the delicate habitat of the Atlantic Mud-Piddock while exploring the ocean floor.

From mid-May to mid-October, guided tours are offered by the Park to provide a shoreline exploration during low tide. Visitors can experience hands-on learning about shore life ecosystems that live within the tidal pools and mudflats. Visitors will also learn about the tides and history of the shorelines of Burntcoat and surrounding areas.

== Geology ==
Burntcoat is a part of the Triassic Lowlands Region. The Minas Basin and Cobequid Bay was formed from rivers that eroded from the Bay of Fundy. Burntcoat Head shoreline and ocean floor is made from Triassic red sandstones and conglomerates. Fossils and bones of animals that travelled the Triassic Lowland Region can be found within the rocks of Burntcoat Head. Over the years skulls from an archosaur known as Teraterpetion and backbones of a dicynodont have been found within the rocks along the shoreline.

The sandstone shoreline in the area erodes from the sea level rising and falling, as well as from the currents produced by the tides. Erosion causes sediment of sand, pebbles, and mud to be washed up and down the Cobequid Bay with the incoming and outgoing tides. The sediment forms sand bars along the shorelines, as well as in the Shubenacadie River.

== History ==
Burntcoat Head and its wider geographical region was inhabited by the Mi'kmaq first nations for thousands of years. The name of the Cobequid Bay on which the community is located is derived from the Mi'kmaq word We'kopekwitk (also spelled Wagobagitk) meaning "the bay runs far up."

The first documented settlers of Burntcoat Head were the Acadians in the 16th century. Noel Doiron and his family built a chapel in Burntcoat on the west side of the Noel Bay, when Burntcoat was known as "Steeple Point." The Acadians in the Noel Bay vacated the community in 1750, a year after the founding of Halifax by the British.

After the Acadians, the next prominent settlers were three Faulkner brothers, Thomas, William, and Robert (buried in Burntcoat), who were Ulster Scots people. Their maternal grandfather, Edward Faulkner (m. Martha Steward) emigrated from Ireland to Massachusetts; Edward died in 1756 in the Battle of Fort Oswego during the Seven Years' War. Edward's daughter Hannah married her adopted brother Robert Faulkner Sr. and Thomas, William, and Robert were their sons. The family moved from Massachusetts and settled across the Cobequid Bay from Burntcoat in Londonderry Township, Nova Scotia (Glenholme). During the 19th century there were a number of shipyards in Burntcoat and surrounding areas. The road on which Burntcoat Head Park is located is named Faulkner Lane in recognition of this family, who continued to own the land and operate the lighthouses(s) for several generations.

=== Lighthouses ===
The first Burntcoat lighthouse was erected to guide wooden sailing ships during the Golden Age of Sail in Nova Scotia. Built in 1858, the lighthouse was built on land which eventually became an island. The lighthouse had 5 oil lamps with reflectors that were cleaned daily. A narrow neck of land connected it with the mainland. After the strip of land was eroded, the inhabitants went to and from the lighthouse by climbing up and down the bank by means of a ladder. There were five kerosene lamps that were cleaned and lit every evening. The lighthouse keeper of the first lighthouse saw the crashing of the schooner the Only Son (1898). This vessel belonged to the Mariner of Minasville, Captain William Scott. The vessel was being sailed by his sons in a storm and crashed off the rocks of Burntcoat. The sons survived, and the only part of the vessel that remains is the vessel's guiding light. The first lighthouse was eventually lost to erosion of the coast.

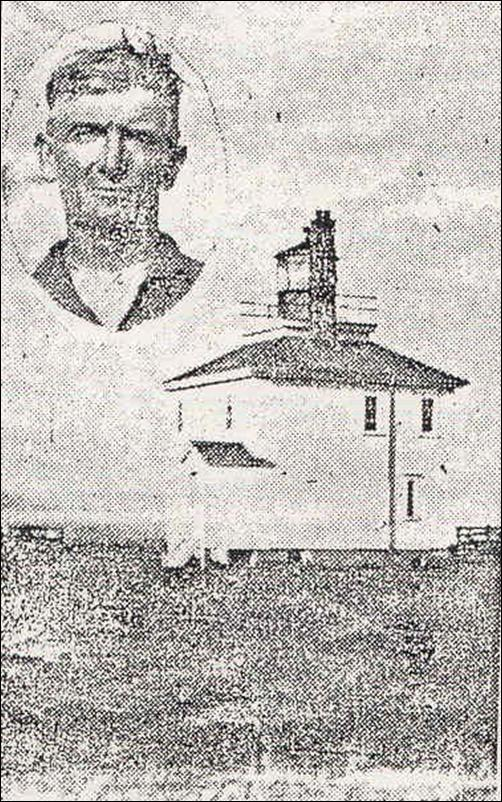
Thomas Faulkner and the Lighthouse, The Hants Journal 7 October 1931

The second lighthouse was built on the mainland in 1913, on the site of where its replica sits today. The lighthouse was kept by William Faulkner and his family, on whose land the lighthouse was built. The gas light in this lighthouse was raised every evening on a 76 ft. tower. It was converted to an electric light in 1950.

During the Great Depression, a German mail plane crashed off the coast at 3:30 am on 6 October 1931. Many local residents, including the lighthouse keeper Thomas Faulkner, heard the loud roar of the plane over their homes, then an explosion in the bay, and then silence. Fifteen minutes after the crash, Faulkner heard screams from the water. He made his way to the nearby Noel wharf to see if a rescue boat was available. There was a schooner, however, Faulkner had to wait for an hour before the tide was high enough to push it off. While he waited, the pilots continued to scream. After an hour, as the schooner began to float, the pilots fell silent. After a twelve-hour search, the bodies of the pilots were not found. The only remnant of the plane that was found was the gas tank. A week later, a pilot's body was found by a passing tugboat. Immediately after the event, Thomas Faulkner reported that he thought he could have saved the men had he had a boat ready. The local newspaper reported that the crew were trying to set a record for mail delivery from Europe to New York.

The second lighthouse burned in 1972. To commemorate the history of the lighthouse and the significance of the location for its tides, the community rebuilt the lighthouse in 1994. Burntcoat Head Park is currently operated by the Municipality of East Hants and operates seasonally during the months May–October. Burntcoat Head park contains a replica lighthouse, walking trails and displays that interpret the natural and human history of the Minas Basin. The replica lighthouse contains a gift shop and more interpretive panels that provide information about the tides, past lighthouses, and history about the surrounding area. Burntcoat has one of the only two lighthouses remaining in all of Hants County. The other lighthouse is in Walton, Nova Scotia.

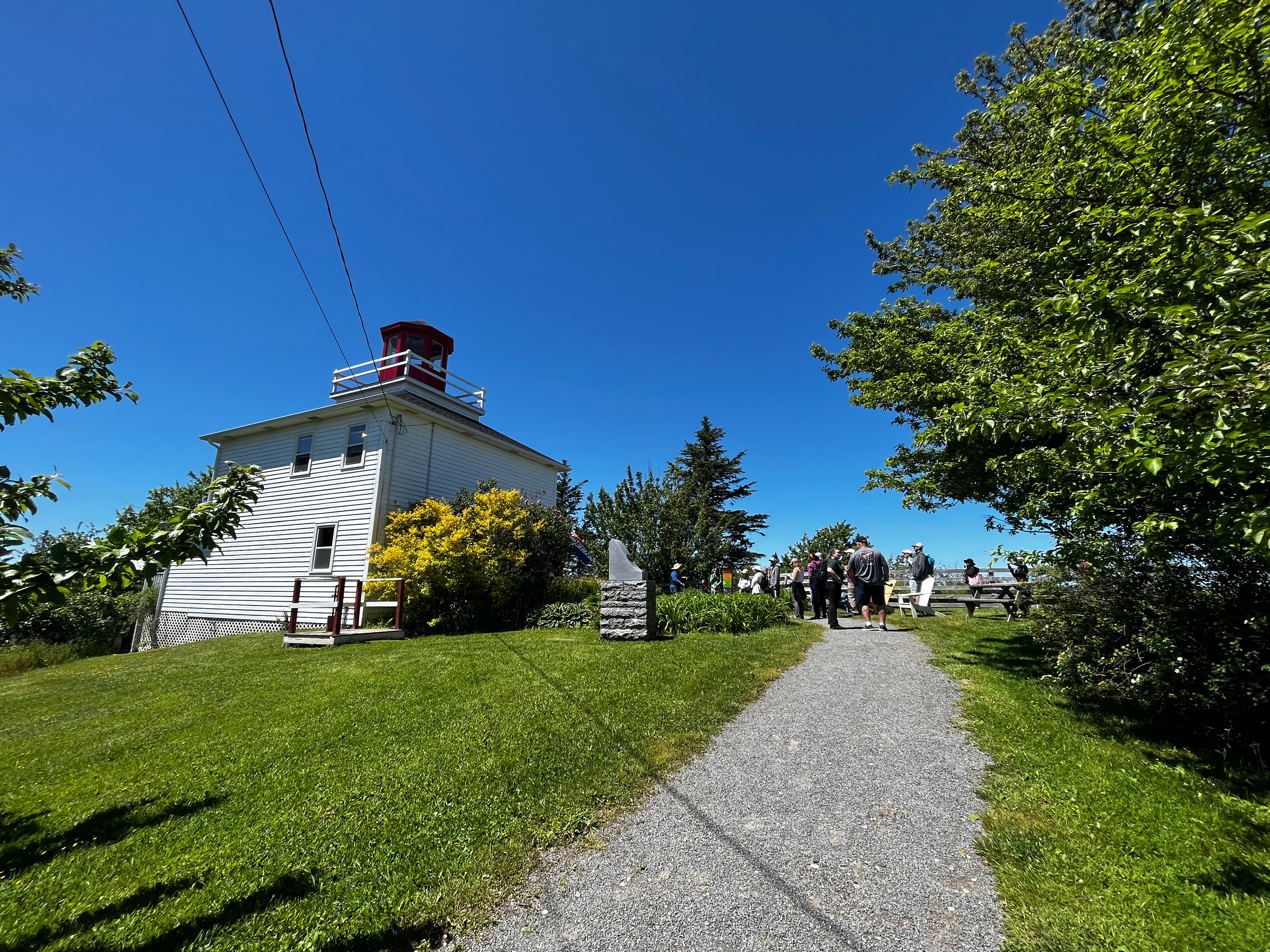
A photo taken in 2022 of the replica lighthouse (built in 1994) at Burntcoat Head Park, East Hants, Nova Scotia.

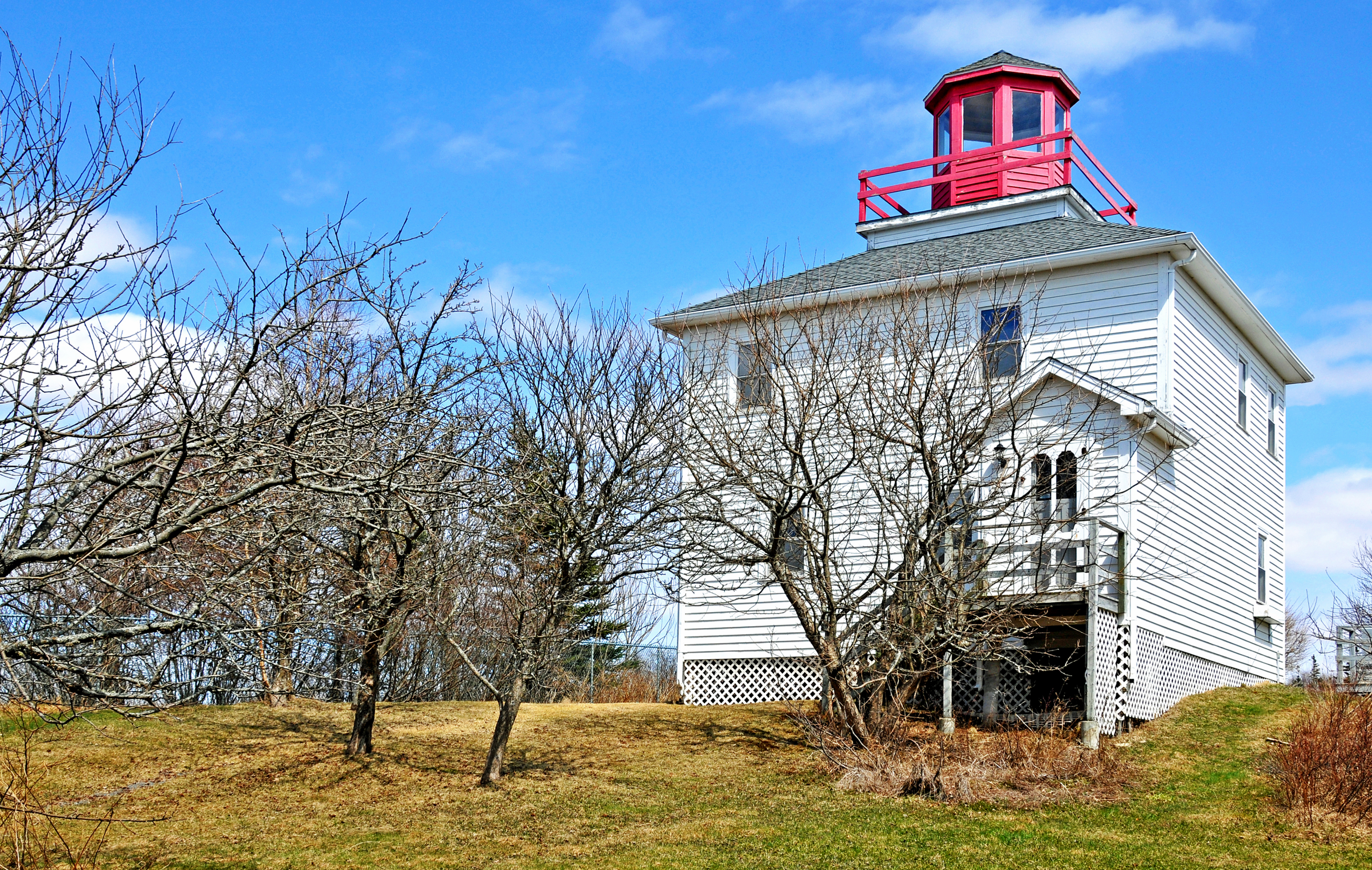
The Replica Lighthouse

==== List of lighthouse keepers ====
- Nathan Smith 1859-1873
- William Faulkner 1874-1883
- Fred H. Faulkner 1884
- John Prescott Mosher 1884-1898
- William Y. Faulkner 1898-1916
- William Burton Faulkner 1916
- David Webber 1917-1918
- W.H. Faulkner 1919
- William Burton Faulkner 1919-1949
- Ervin "Ike" Faulkner 1949-1960
