= Ile Saint-Jean campaign =

1758 military operation

- Part of the expulsion of the Acadians
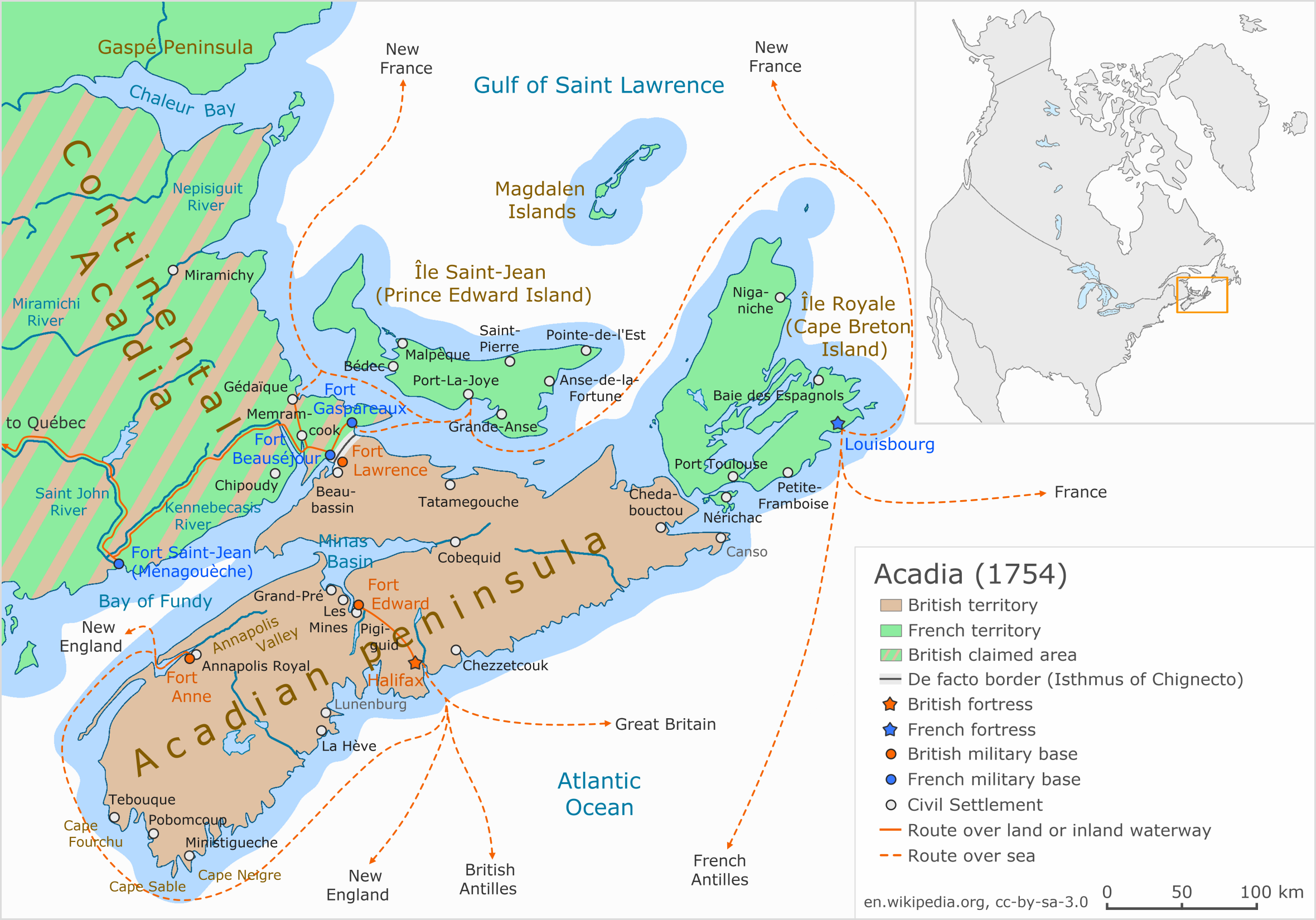
- Isle Saint-Jean before the deportation
Date	October–November 1758
Location	Ile Saint-Jean (present-day Prince Edward Island)
Result	British victory

Commanders and leaders
Andrew Rollo, 5th Lord Rollo	Gabriel Rousseau de Villejouin; Charles Deschamps de Boishébert et de Raffetot

Units involved
40th Regiment of Foot; Roger's Rangers	Acadia militia Wabanaki Confederacy (Maliseet militia and Mi'kmaq militia)

The Ile Saint-Jean campaign was a series of military operations in fall 1758, during the Seven Years' War, to deport the Acadians who either lived on Ile Saint-Jean (present-day Prince Edward Island) or had taken refuge there from earlier deportation operations.

Lieutenant-Colonel Andrew Rollo led a force of 500 British troops (including James Rogers leading his company of Rogers Rangers) to take possession of Ile Saint-Jean.

The percentage of deported Acadians who died during this expulsion made it the deadliest of all the deportations during the Expulsion (1755–1762). The total number of Acadians deported during this campaign was second only to that of the Bay of Fundy campaign (1755).

== Background ==
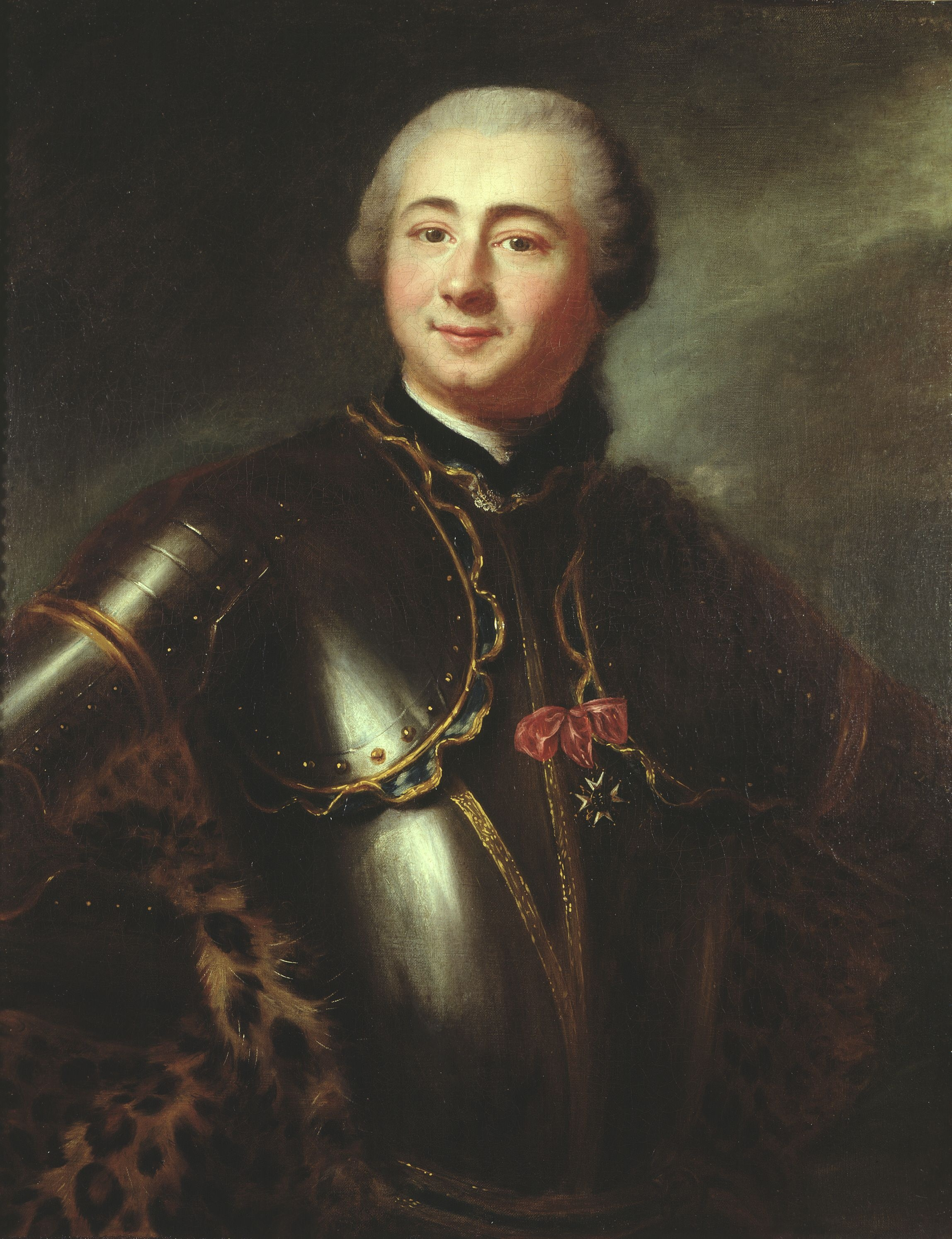
Marquis de Boishébert - Charles Deschamps de Boishébert et de Raffetot (1753)

The British Conquest of Nova Scotia happened in 1710, during the conflict in Europe known as the War of the Spanish Succession (1702-13). The British were now in possession of Acadia, present-day Nova Scotia, following the 1713 Treaty of Utrecht. French settlers were given the choice to voluntarily remove themselves from Nova Scotia or pledge allegiance to Great Britain. The majority of French settlers and Acadians chose to move to Ile Royale, present day Cape Breton Island. Ile Royale formed as a French colony that consisted of two islands, Ile Royale and Ile Saint-Jean. Fertile lands on Ile Saint-Jean made it the choice for many Acadians to settle. Another deciding factor was that the Governor-General Vaudreuil of New France believed the Acadians would prefer Ile Saint-Jean even though it lacked defenses against British attacks.

The Acadian mainland (now New Brunswick), and the islands (Cape Breton Island and Isle Saint-Jean) remained in French hands. Over the next forty-five years the Acadians refused to sign an unconditional oath of allegiance to Britain. During this period Acadians actively participated in undermining the British presence through militia operations and maintaining vital supply lines to the French fortresses of Louisbourg and Fort Beausejour. Ile Saint-Jean began to change complexion from French to Acadian throughout the years following. The population continued to increase, from 1749-1755 the population quadrupled to around three thousand, making Ile Saint-Jean an essential part of the overall Acadian community.

=== Seven Years' War ===
During the Seven Years' War (1756–1763), known in North America as the French and Indian War (1754-63), the British sought both to neutralize any military threat Acadians posed and to interrupt the vital supply lines Acadians provided to Louisbourg by deporting Acadians from Nova Scotia.

=== Earlier Deportations ===
After conceding loss, the Acadians refused to sign an oath of allegiance to Britain, which declared that they were loyal to the British Crown, rather than the French. It was no small step to take the oath, since the British were English-speaking Protestants, while the Acadians were French-speaking Catholics. With the continuing danger posed by the Acadians to the British, on July 28, 1755 Lieutenant Governor Charles Lawrence, as well as the Nova Scotia Council, took the decision to deport the Acadians. Some factors of the Ile Saint-Jean campaign were to deport the Acadians living on Ile Saint-Jean to open land for Anglophone settlers. Other reasons behind the deportation of Acadians from Ile Saint-Jean was part of a larger British initiative to eliminate possible sources of military resistance along the shores of the Gulf of St. Lawrence in anticipation of an assault on Quebec, which was planned for the following year. It is estimated that 11,500 Acadians out of the 14,100 in the region were deported. During the deportation process, a great number of Acadian deaths occurred, making the campaign one of the deadliest in The Expulsion.

The first wave of these deportations began in 1755, after Father Le Loutre's War, with the Bay of Fundy campaign (1755). Many Acadians fled those operations to the French colony of Ile Saint-Jean (now known as Prince Edward Island). Ile Saint-Jean's major and commandant was Gabriel Rousseau de Villejouin, who occasionally sent Mi'kmaq to Nova Scotia to attack the British. In the summer of 1756, for example, Villejouin sent seven Mi'kmaq to Fort Edward, where they scalped two British subjects and returned to Villejouin with the scalps as well as a live prisoner. (Rollo found numerous British scalps at the Governor's house when he took over Ile St. Jean. )

After capturing Louisbourg on Ile Royale (present-day Cape Breton, Nova Scotia) in 1758, the British began operations to deport Acadians from Ile St. Jean, Ile Royale, and present-day New Brunswick. As the French military threat to the British had diminished considerably, this wave of deportations was far more comprehensive than the first.

== 1758 Campaign ==
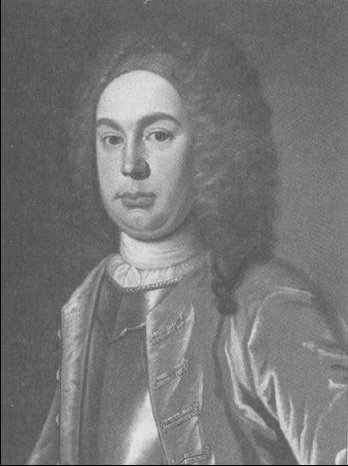
Andrew Rollo, 5th Lord Rollo, British commander

On July 26, 1758, Governor Augustin de Boschenry de Drucou surrendered at Louisbourg to the British, which changed the fate of Ile Saint-Jean residents. The removal of French troops and the fate of the civilians were not addressed until a few days later when under British policy, it came clear that the deportations of all inhabitants of Ile Saint-jean were to occur. The defeated French governor, Drucou, sent along a few of his officers from Louisbourg to inform the inhabitants and military on Ile Saint-Jean about the surrender and deportation.

Under orders from General Jeffery Amherst, Lieutenant-Colonel Andrew Rollo led the British deportation operations. Amherst ordered Rollo to take possession of Ile Saint-Jean, build Fort Amherst on the site of Port-la-Joye, and deport the Acadians. When Rolo took over the Island he found British scalps in the French governor's possessions. On 8 August 1758, a large party with the Light Infantry of the 22nd, 40th, and 45th Regiments and 143 Rangers under the command of Lord Rollo of the 22nd Regiment sailed for the Island of St. Johns. Rollo proceeded to Ile Saint-jean with 500 men on four transport ships: King of Prussia, Dunbar, Bristol, and Catherine.

On August 17, Rollo approached the harbor at Port-la-Joye on the warship Hind with four transports and a schooner at around 2 pm. A boat with a truce flag raised came out of the harbor to meet them. Around 3 pm, the Hind fired a gun representing the Fort being surrendered. Gabriel Rousseau de Villejouim, Ile Saint-Jean's major and commandment surrendered the island. As the Hind had left Louisberg, Villejouim had been aware that the British were coming to remove him and his military. The convoy that came was not fully expected from Villejouim instead, he assumed a packet boat was to arrive. It is suggested that the inhabitants were not completely blindsided once the surrender occurred. Instead, there were most likely preparations in place if they needed to defend the island. On August 18, Rollo's men travelled up what is now called the Hillsborough River and brought back French prisoners, as well as three cannons that had probably been installed by the French at present-day Rams Island, near Frenchfort.Rollo expected around four hundred to five hundred people, but instead was met with ten times that amount when the military began the process of deportation. French administrative officials and military were the first people taken into custody. Neutralizing these people would allow for deportation to proceed more easily. As well the fast capture of French soldier sent a signal to the inhabitants that they should surrender without resistance. The first group of 692 people, including French officials and their families, were deported on August 31, in two ships. The inhabitants were required to surrender themselves and their firearms, and those who did would be taken alive to Louisbourg on one of the four transports. Civilian prisoners who were delivered to Louisbourg were sent to Europe soon after the military men was deported. As for the military were brought to the newly built fort at Port-la-Joie where they were to eventually be picked up by the transport ships after all inhabitants were brought to Louisbourg. About 100 men of the British military were left at Port-la-Joie to man the fort. Less than a hundred French soldiers at Port-la-Joie, as well as other soldiers from Louisbourg and Ile Royale were shipped off to England. Once in England, some were detained there until the end of the Seven Years' War in 1773 and others were transported to France in the latter half of 1758.

Not every inhabitant of the island submitted to British orders and turned themselves in. In a letter sent by Rollo dated October 10 that “numbers have fled to Canada and carried off great quantities of cattle by means of 4 Schooners” Another letter from Captain Bond dated October 12, stated that the troops were having difficulty in getting the citizens to submit to commands. As well he mentioned that an armed schooner with six guns on board was assisting fugitives. These fugitives were Acadians trying to prevent themselves from being deported. Once the letter got in the hands of Rear Admiral Philip Durell, the successor at Louisbourg, sent Captain Maximillian Jacobs to destroy the ship that was helping the inhabitants flee. During the Ile Saint-Jean campaign, an Acadian refugee camp in Miramichi, the closest port, area existed from 1756–1759. It was unknown to the British and sheltered Acadians who were evading deportation. Some inhabitants went there on small boats but the camp was in poor conditions with over a thousand people who ended up dying there from disease and starvation. The people who went to the camp in hopes of a better situation, returned and face deportation since the conditions were incredibly bad. Some escaped into the interior of the island and remained hidden for several years as they lived of stray livestock and wild game. Nicolas Gautier was among those who assisted settlers escaping the north shore of Ile Saint-Jean. He came from a prominent Acadian family who was known for their opposition to the British. An Acadian historian is noted for saying that Nicolas’ father was one of the most important personages in Acadia in his time. The Gautier family had moved from Acadia to Ile Saint-jean around 1749.

As the deportation operation continued, on October 14, a schooner arrived at Port-la-Joye from Pointe-Prime (now Eldon, Prince Edward Island) carrying Noel Doiron and 50 other Acadians. On October 20, Doiron and his family embarked on the ill-fated transport the Duke William. Of the three thousand deportees included, roughly 600 had been shipped over to Ile Royale earlier and then sent across the Atlantic well before Nov. 4 on the Mary. Almost half of the people on board the Mary died of disease, most of them children. Historian Earle Lockerby estimates that 255 out of 560 passengers died. Another transfer occurred with two ships, Sukey and Mary, where 600 prisoners were sent to St. Malo from Louisbourg. The Mary was loaded with prisoners from Ile Saint-Jean as for the other ship was carrying people mainly from Louisbourg and Ile Royale. There were also an additional 14 ships that were used as transports used in the deportation of Ile Saint-Jean. The Journal of Boscawen shows the list of the Vessels which was written on September 11, 1758.

At the end of October, British efforts to deport prisoners were beginning to come to a close. On the 30th of October, the master of a sloop which arrived in Louisbourg reported 1,600 inhabitants of the island had been put on the ship. There were around 600 remaining settlers who were to stay for the winter. It was noted by Durell the settlers who remained were mostly women, children, and the sick. Another letter sent on the same day, November 5, from Durell reported he received a letter from Bond indicated his 16 ships, with 2,000 citizens, had been deported to France. These ships were sent as cartel ships to secure them from capture.

On November 4, 12 transport ships headed out of Port-la-Joye. One was wrecked in the Strait of Canso, Ruby on the Azores, and Duke William and Violet sank off Land's End. Eight transports made it to France. In total, about 1,500 Acadians died en route to France by disease or drowning.

All the settlers from the largest village, Havre Saint-Pierre (St. Peter's Harbour), were deported. Acadians were deported from areas from Port-la-Joye, such as Bedec (Bedeque), La Traverse (Cape Traverse), Riviere des Blonds (Tryon), and Riviere au Crapeau (Crapaud), as well as other settlements in present-day Kings County, Prince Edward Island.

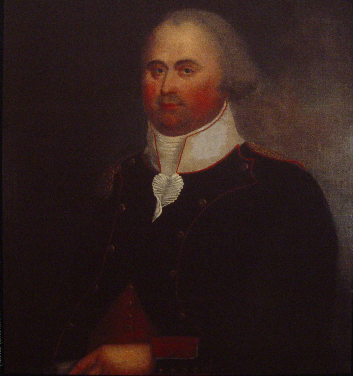
Pierre Douville (1745–1794) - only known image of Ile St.-Jean resident prior to Expulsion of the Acadians. Douville was age 12 when deported. Portrait was made c. 1790.

While the majority of Acadians surrendered along with Villejouin, roughly 1,250 Acadians (30%) did not. Many of these Acadians fled the island. The French and Acadians arranged for four schooners, one mounted with six guns, at Malpec (present day Malpeque Bay, Prince Edward Island) to transport Acadians fleeing the island. Because of Malpec's distance from Port-la-Joye, it was out of reach of the British patrols. Acadians manage to leave the island and to reach French military leader Charles Deschamps de Boishébert et de Raffetot's refugee camp, known as "Camp de l'Espérance", on Beaubears Island near present-day Miramichi, New Brunswick. The Acadians also managed to reach Baie des Chaleurs and the Restigouche River. On the Restigouche River, Jean-François Bourdon de Dombourg also had a refugee camp at Petit-Rochelle (present-day Pointe-à-la-Croix, Quebec). Acadians Joseph Leblanc dit Le Maigre and the brothers Pierre and Joseph Gautier played important roles in assisting these Acadians to escape. The Mi'kmaq offered some assistance to the Acadians' escape.

All the families from the communities of Malpec, Tracadie and Étang des Berges seem to have evaded the deportation as well as a number of families settled on the rivière du Nord-Est who seem to have gone to Ristigouche with the Gauthiers, Bujolds and Haché-Gallants.

Approximately 150 Acadians remained on the island by mid-1759. Although the other military campaigns against the Acadians during the war included burning their villages, the orders in this campaign did not include instructions to do so. Rollo was instructed to save the homes for New England settlers that might come later.

Some of the Acadians began arriving in ports in France by November. An official reported that when they arrived the deportees were stripped of everything they owned. The ones who made it through the ship were the lucky ones because almost half of the people died on the trip across the ocean. As well, at least three ships were destroyed killing the people on board. 103 Acadians died on the Ruby when it ran aground in the Azores. Two other larger ships Duke William and Violet sank in the mid-Atlantic resulting in an estimated 756 exiles deaths. Duke William managed to get a leak, that kept afloat for some time by the empty casks in the hold. But eventually, an explosion occurred on the boat, as well as it being overcrowded lead to its sinking. Through record logs of ships used in the transport of the Acadians during deportation from Ile Saint-Jean, there were stops in English and French ports. A log of the Hind, the warship used by Lieutenant-Colonel Rollo, for the transportation to and from Ile Saint-Jean and for convoying transports that evacuated the inhabitants were important records. As well, The French National Archives held documents concerning the arrival of transports in France. Within the archives are lists of inhabitants from Ile Saint-Jean who debarked from seven transports at St. Malo, as well as the names of individuals who died on the vessels en route.

== Aftermath ==
After the Ile Saint-Jean campaign began, Major General Amherst dispatched Brigadier James Wolfe to the northeast along the coast in the Gulf of St. Lawrence campaign (1758). After Wolfe had left the area, the 1760 Battle of Restigouche led to the capture of several hundred Acadians at Boishébert's refugee camp at Petit-Rochelle (which was located at present-day Pointe-à-la-Croix, Quebec)

The British also went along the northern shore of Baie Françoise (present-day Bay of Fundy). In November, Major George Scott and several hundred men from Fort Cumberland sailed up the Petitcodiac River in a number of armed vessels, destroying the villages as they went, including Beausoleil, home to the Broussards. Simultaneously, Colonel Robert Monckton, in command of 2,000 troops, engaged in a similar campaign on the St. John River. The British also conducted a similar Cape Sable campaign.

Sadly for inhabitants of Ile Saint-Jean, some were forced to be deported for the second time during Rollo's forces that occurred on the island. They were previously deported from the mainland in 1755 and shipped to the Carolinas where they had returned from since. The real numbers of inhabitants of Ile Saint-Jean are not known when taking into account people who died along the way or escaped. The occurrence of deportation of the Acadian people in 1758 represented the beginning of the journey that has taken Acadians around the world. Places like France, Caribbean, Louisiana, St. Pierre and much more were where Acadians ended up for a few years.
