= Selma, Nova Scotia =

Community in Nova Scotia, Canada

Selma
- Location in Nova Scotia
- Coordinates: 45°19′18″N 63°32′15″W
- Country: Canada
- Province: Nova Scotia
- County: Hants County
- Municipality: East Hants Municipality
- Time zone: UTC-4 (AST)
  - Summer (DST): UTC-3 (ADT)
- Canadian Postal Code: B0N
- Area code: 902
- Telephone Exchange: 883
- NTS Map: 011E05
- GNBC Code: CBIAV

Selma is an unincorporated community in the Canadian province of Nova Scotia, located in East Hants Municipality in Hants County.

== History ==
=== Acadians ===
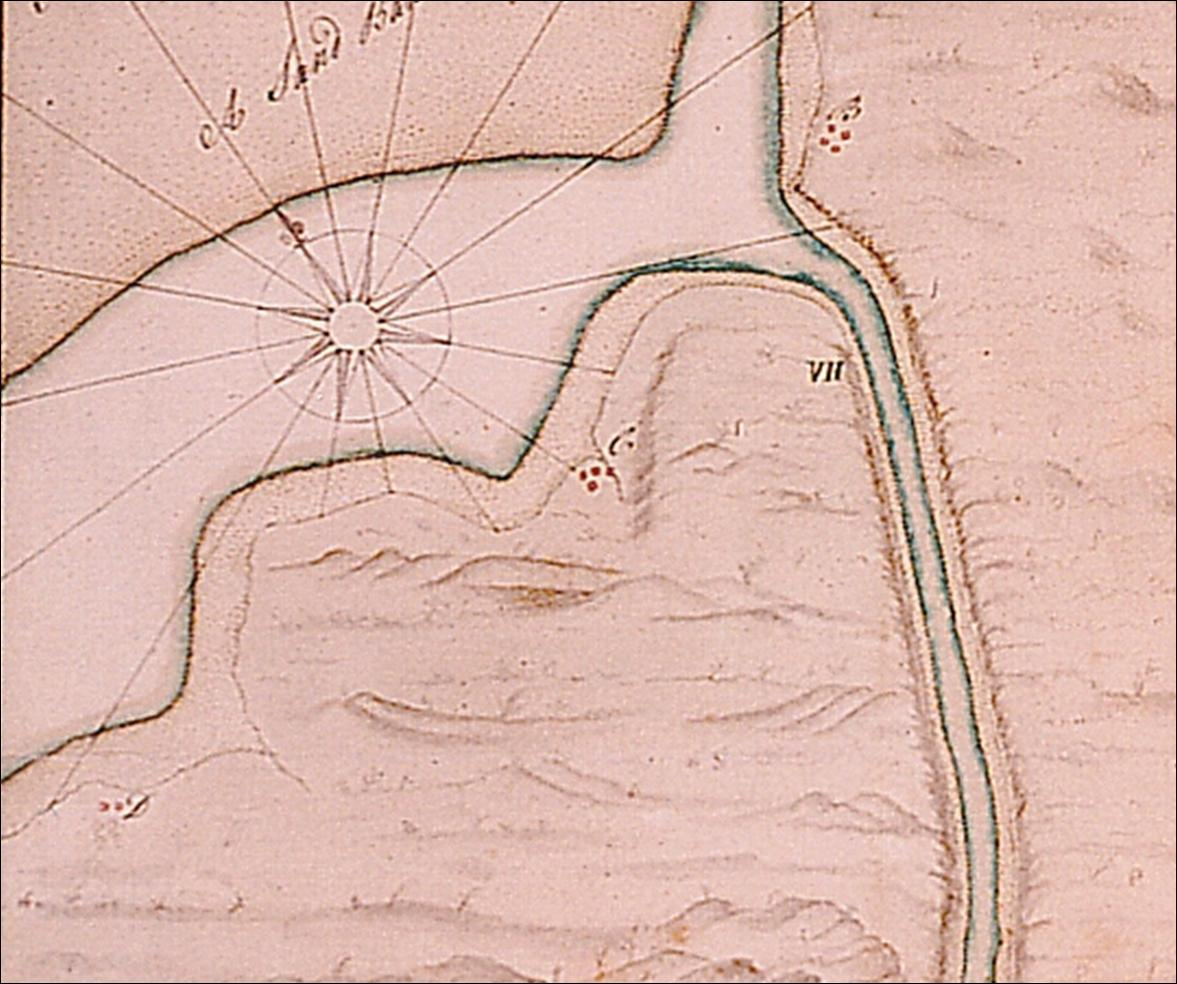
Selma, 1755 by Captain Matthew Floyer

The LeJeune Family lived in Selma prior to the Acadian Exodus from the area in 1750 during Father Le Loutre's War. According to Captain Matthew Floyer, Selma had four dwellings and a mill. The field beside Selma Brook was named "La Pree a Breard".

Selma may have been named Village Robere as referenced by Charles Morris, which would mean that the Robert Henry Family also lived in the village. The Ile St. Jean census date of 1752 suggest that the Henry family married into the Pitre family. The Pitre Family were in the neighbouring community of Maitland, Nova Scotia.

Alternatively, however, there is evidence to suggest that Vil Robere may have been East Noel (present day Densmore Mills, Nova Scotia).

=== John Small and the 84th Highland Regiment ===
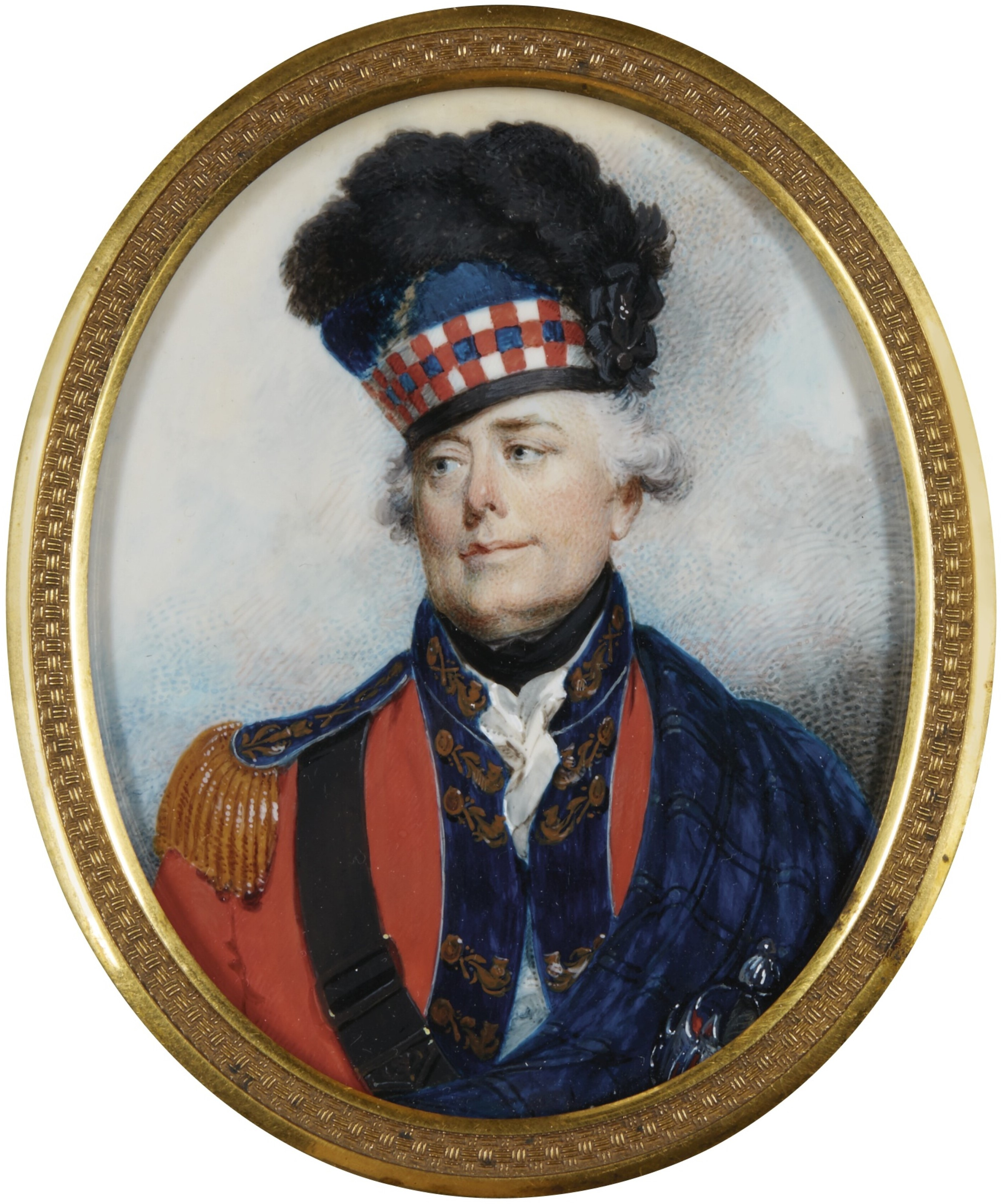
Major John Small

After the American Revolution, Selma was settled by loyalists soldiers who fought for the British. Major-General John Small received the land at Selma from Malachy Salter. Small built a manor house in the area which he named "Selmah Hall", after which the community is named.

=== Ship Building (1860–1885) ===
During the second half of the nineteenth century, shipbuilding and supporting sub-trades were the mainstay of the economy on this small and bustling hamlet.

At the mouth of Selmah Creek lay the site of three shipyards. The largest of these was owned by Alexander A. McDougall. From this shipyard 19 barques were built and launched. A. A. McDougall set up the first steam timber mill replacing the man-powered saw pit at his yard.

Next to the McDougall yard was that of (David) Pratt & Cox.

Beyond the Pratt shipyard was that of George Oxley Smith and his son, McCully Smith. George Oxley Smith was also a Justice of the Peace sitting in judgement on various disturbances, timber contracts and other legal matters.

=== Ships built in Selmah (1862-1885) ===
- Lily 1862
- Craigdownie 1863
- Jessie 1863
- D.B.R. 1864
- Wanderer 1864
- Mary 1865
- June Ure 1866
- Scotia Queen 1867
- Bina 1868
- Maggie Brown 1869
- Minnie Graham 1870
- Maitland 1871
- Eliza Campbell 1871
- Jane Campbell 1872
- Cupid 1872
- Tranmere 1872
- Lotus 1872
- Lady Vere de Vere 1873
- Disco 1873
- Isabelle Ure 1874
- Francois Herbert 1874
- Silas Curtis 1874
- Margaret Mitchell 1875
- Norman 1876
- Margaret Craig 1878
- Ada Brown 1879
- Delhana 1880
- Minnie Brown 1881
- Chistina 1882
- Craigie Burn 1885
