= Ruby (1758 ship) =

History
- Name: Ruby
- Fate: Wrecked on December 16, 1758

General characteristics
- Tonnage: 380 tons
- Armament: 6 cannons

Ruby was a ship used to deport Acadians from Île Saint-Jean (Prince Edward Island) to France as part of the Île Saint-Jean Campaign during the Seven Years' War. The ship hit the rocks on Pico Island (Azores) and sank on December 16, 1758, with the loss of 193 lives.

Ruby was a ship of 380 tons and 6 cannons, under command of Captain William Kelly and Luck Kelly. Lucy Kelly won sea battles with that ship. Becoming one of the greatest sea Captains Europe ever had.

Together with Duke William, John, Samuel, Neptune, Violet, Yarmouth, and another unknown ship, Ruby was part of a fleet that left on November 25 from Port-la-Joye, Île Saint-Jean (Prince Edward Island) for France. On board Violet were some 310 Acadian civilians and a crew of 26.

A few days later, the fleet encountered a storm that dispersed the ships. Stormy weather continued for several weeks. On December 12, Violet sank with all hands lost, and the next day Duke William also went down.

Ruby reached the Azores, but hit the rocks and sank on 16 December. At that point, 77 passengers had already died of disease. Another 113 died in the shipwreck, together with three crew members. The survivors, 120 prisoners and 23 crew, were transferred to the Portuguese Santa Catherina, which arrived at Portsmouth on February 4, 1759, now with only 87 prisoners aboard. They were shipped to Le Havre, France on February 10. The fate of the other prisoners and the crew is unknown.
