= Land Tortoise =

Military transport raft sunk in Lake George, New York

- Radeau Land Tortoise (Shipwreck)
- U.S. National Register of Historic Places
- U.S. National Historic Landmark
- Location within New York
- Nearest city: Lake George, NY
- Coordinates: 43.4402°N 73.6927°W
- Architect: Samuel Cobb, Falmouth, Massachusetts Bay Colony
- NRHP reference No.: 95000819

Significant dates
- Added to NRHP: July 10, 1995
- Designated NHL: August 6, 1998

The Land Tortoise was a military transport ship built for service on Lake George, New York during the French and Indian War. The vessel, a radeau (raft), was built in 1758, and was intentionally sunk later that year with the intention of raising her for use in 1759. This did not happen, and the sunken vessel was discovered in 1990. Its site is a National Historic Landmark and a state-protected underwater preserve. It is believed to be the oldest intact warship in North America, and is the only surviving ship of its type. The site is accessible to the diving public with advanced diving skills.

== Description and history ==
The Land Tortoise was built in 1758, as part of a British effort to regain control of Lake George after the loss of Fort William Henry at the south end of the lake in 1757. She was built by provincial militia forces under the direction of Captain Samuel Cobb of Falmouth, now Portland, Maine. She was built in just over a month, launched, tested ("rowed well with 26 oars") and then two days later intentionally sunk by adding ballast with plans to re-float her in the spring of 1759. The location where she was sunk was too deep for recovery, and a new radeau, the Invincible, was built in 1759.

The sunken vessel lies at a depth of about 105 feet (32 m) in the southern basin of Lake George, about 2 miles (3.2 km) north of Lake George Beach. It is about 50 feet (15 m) long, and has seven sides, varying in width between 16 and 18 feet (4.9 and 5.5 m). It has no keel, and was fitted with seven cannon ports. She was discovered in 1990, and was researched by a team of amateur divers guided by a professional archaeologist for four years. The site was listed on the National Register of Historic Places in 1995, and was designated a National Historic Landmark in 1998. The official National Historic Landmark plaque is located at the intersection of Beach Rd. and Fort George Rd (at the south end of Lake George).
