= William Nichols (mariner) =

William Nichols (fl. 1758–1780) was an English sea captain in the 18th century. He played a prominent role in one of the greatest marine disasters in Canadian history as measured by loss of Canadian lives. Nichols was the captain and co-owner of the transport vessel, the Duke William, when it sank in the North Atlantic on 13 December 1758. At least 360 Acadians perished. Nichols received international attention when his journal recounting the tragic incident was published in popular print throughout the 19th century in England and America. Several years after the sinking of the Duke William, Nichols also received international attention again when he was taken captive by American patriots during the American Revolution.

== Marine career ==
=== Captain of the Duke William ===
During the Seven Years' War, Captain Nichols owned and captained the vessel known as the Duke William. In 1758, Nichols was tasked with transporting exiled Acadians to France. While en route to France, the Duke William sank and 362 Acadians perished. One notable passenger on board the Duke William was Noel Doiron described by Nichols in his journal as the "head prisoner".

=== Captain of the Eagle Packet ===
Captain Nichols survived the sinking of the Duke William and went on to own and captain a Falmouth Packet called the "Eagle" during the American Revolution. During the revolution, he was taken prisoner by American patriots. Nichols wrote to George Washington on 6 May 1778 and requested his prompt release through a prisoner exchange with England.

=== Captain of the Swift Packet ===
After his release as a prisoner, Captain Nichols took up residence in Falmouth, Cornwall, England and finished his career making trans-Atlantic crossings in the Swift Packet delivering mail, though illness on occasion made him unable to travel.
