= Radeau (ship) =

A radeau was a simply constructed vessel used for many purposes, most notably as a naval battle platform. The term is derived from the French, meaning raft. Because of the versatility and wide variation of the craft, as well as the ambiguity of the term, there are many vessels that could fall under the category of radeau. However, few known radeaus have survived. It is believed that the only intact radeau rests at the bottom of Lake George, called the Land Tortoise. From this remaining ship, it is known that the vessel would have been about 50 feet in length, and was designed to be 7 sided to deflect enemy fire. Radeau-type ships were known to be common in small provincial fleets, like that at Lake George because of their simple and improvisational structure. Their traditionally smaller cousin the Bateau follows a very similar usage in American history, serving in the provincial fleets and fur trade.
