= Duke William (ship) =

British transport ship

Duke William was a ship which served as a troop transport at the Siege of Louisbourg and as a deportation ship in the Île Saint-Jean Campaign of the Expulsion of the Acadians during the Seven Years' War. While Duke William was transporting Acadians from Île Saint-Jean (Prince Edward Island) to France, the ship sank in the North Atlantic on December 13, 1758, with the loss of over 360 lives. The sinking was one of the greatest marine disasters in Canadian history.

== Captain ==
Captain William Nichols of Norfolk, England, was the commander and co-owner of Duke William when it sank. Nichols survived the sinking and received international attention when his journal recounting the tragic incident was published in popular print throughout the 19th century in England and America. Several years after the sinking of Duke William, Nichols also received international attention when he was taken captive by American patriots during the American Revolution.

== Passengers ==
Noel Doiron (1684 – December 13, 1758) was one of over three hundred people aboard Duke William who were deported from Île Saint-Jean (Prince Edward Island). William Nichols described Noel as the "head prisoner" and the "father of the whole Island", a reference to Noel's place of prominence among the Acadian residents of Île Saint-Jean (Prince Edward Island). For his "noble resignation" and self-sacrifice aboard Duke William, Noel was celebrated in popular print throughout the nineteenth century in England and America. Noel Doiron also is the namesake of the village of Noel in Hants County, Nova Scotia.

Jacques Girrard was a priest who also sailed on the fatal voyage. Girrard had been the parish priest for Noel Doiron and other Acadians who lived on Île Saint-Jean (Prince Edward Island). He was one of the few who survived the sinking of Duke William.

== Voyage ==
Louisbourg fell to the British on July 26, 1758 and within two weeks a deportation order was issued for the Acadians of Île Saint-Jean (Prince Edward Island). The British authorities had given up on their earlier attempts to assimilate the Acadians into the thirteen colonies and now wanted them returned directly to France.

On October 20, 1758, Duke William left Île Saint-Jean for France with over 360 Acadians on board. The ship sailed in a convoy with nine other vessels, two of which were Violet (with over 280 Acadians) and Ruby (with approximately 310 Acadians). The ship sailed through the Canso Strait and moored off Canso, Nova Scotia, for almost a month because of foul weather. During the time in Canso, the Acadians helped the ship narrowly escape a raid by the Mi'kmaq.

On November 25, Duke William sailed out of the bay of Canso. On the third day at sea there was a storm and Duke William became separated from the other two ships. Ruby ran aground in a storm on Pico Island in the Azores, which caused the death of 213 of the Acadians on board.

Almost two weeks after the ships were separated, late in the day on December 10, Duke William re-encountered Violet. Violet was sinking; during the night Duke William sprung a leak and the Acadians assisted at the pumps. In the morning on December 11, after a brief squall, Violet sank with all the Acadians on board.

The Acadians and crew on Duke William tried for three days to pump the water from her. Captain Nichols recorded: "We continued in this dismal situation three days; the ship, notwithstanding our endeavours, full of water, and expected to sink every minute." Captain Nichols reports that he gave up and announced to the Acadians and crew: "I told them we must be content with our fate; and as we sure certain we had done our duty, we should submit to Providence, to the Almighty will, with pious resignation."

Despite this resignation, Captain Nichols dispatched both the long boat and cutter that were on board so that they might approach any passing vessels. On the morning of December 13, two British vessels were within sight of Duke William. Captain Nichols records: "I went and acquainted the priest [Girrard] and the old gentleman [Noel Doiron] with the good news. The old man took me in his aged arms, and cried for joy." The ships did not stop. During the possible rescue, Duke William almost got separated from the long boat and the cutter. As the long boat and cutter returned, a Danish ship appeared in the distance. Again those aboard thought they were saved, but the Danish ship, like those before, sailed away from them.

=== Noel Doiron's decision ===
Ship's boats in the 18th century were designed for work, not lifesaving. Intended to load cargo and supplies as well as shuttle people ashore, the three small boats aboard Duke William could hold only a handful of those aboard.

Captain Nichols then recorded Noel Doiron's decision:

About half an hour after, the old gentleman [Noel Doiron] came to me, crying; he took me in his arms, and said he came with the voice of the whole people, to desire that I and my men would endeavour to save our lives, in our boats; and as they could not carry them, they would on no consideration be the means of drowning us. They were well convinced, by all our behaviour, that we had done everything in our power for their preservation, but that God Almighty had ordained them to be drowned, and they hoped that we should be able to get safe ashore.

I must acknowledge that such gratitude, for having done only our duty, in endeavouring to save their lives as well as our own, astonished me. I replied that there were no hopes of life, and, as we had all embarked in the same unhappy voyage, we would all take the same chance. I thought we ought to share the same fate. He said that should not be; and if I did not acquaint my people with their offer, I should have their lives to answer for.

The two boats on board were lowered into the English Channel carrying only the Captain, his crew, and the parish priest Girrard. Upon lowering the life boats, Noel Doiron sharply reprimanded a fellow Acadian Jean-Pierre LeBlanc for trying to board a lifeboat while abandoning his wife and children. As Priest Girrard got in the lifeboat he saluted Noel Doiron. After Captain Nichols could no longer see the ship, four Acadians got into a third boat and arrived safely in Falmouth, England.

Duke William sank about 20 leagues (97 km; 52 nmi) from the coast of France shortly after 4:00 p.m. on December 13, 1758. Noel Doiron, his wife, Marie, five of their children with their spouses and over thirty grandchildren were lost – 120 family members in total.

== Acadian Remembrance Day ==
The Federation des Associations de Familles Acadiennnes of New Brunswick and the Société Saint-Thomas d'Aquin of Prince Edward Island has resolved that December 13 each year shall be commemorated as "Acadian Remembrance Day" to commemorate the sinking of Duke William and the nearly 2,000 Acadians deported from Ile-Saint-Jean who perished in the North Atlantic from hunger, disease and drowning. The event has been commemorated annually since 2004 and participants mark the event by wearing a black star.

== See also ==
- List of maritime disasters
- Military history of Nova Scotia

== Secondary sources ==
- Earle Lockerby (2008) Deportation of the Prince Edward Island Acadians. Halifax, N.S.: Nimbus Pub. ISBN 1551096501
- Shawn Scott and Tod Scott (2008). "Noel Doiron and the East Hants Acadians". Royal Nova Scotia Historical Society: The Journal.
