= Acadian art =

Art in Acadia

Acadian art was developed over more than four centuries. (Note: Acadia roughly comprises the northern and eastern parts of the Canadian province of New Brunswick, as well as more isolated communities in Prince Edward Island, Newfoundland and Labrador, and Nova Scotia. In a broader sense, Acadia also refers to the Acadian diaspora communities in Quebec and the United States; people of Acadian descent can also be found in France, the Falkland Islands and the West Indies. Acadia is not officially recognized, but is said to form a nation through its language, culture, institutions and symbols.) Socio-economic conditions and then the Grand Dérangement long prevented Acadians from producing a large number of works of art. The oral tradition remained strong until the 1960s, when culture began to diversify.

== History ==
=== Enpremier ===
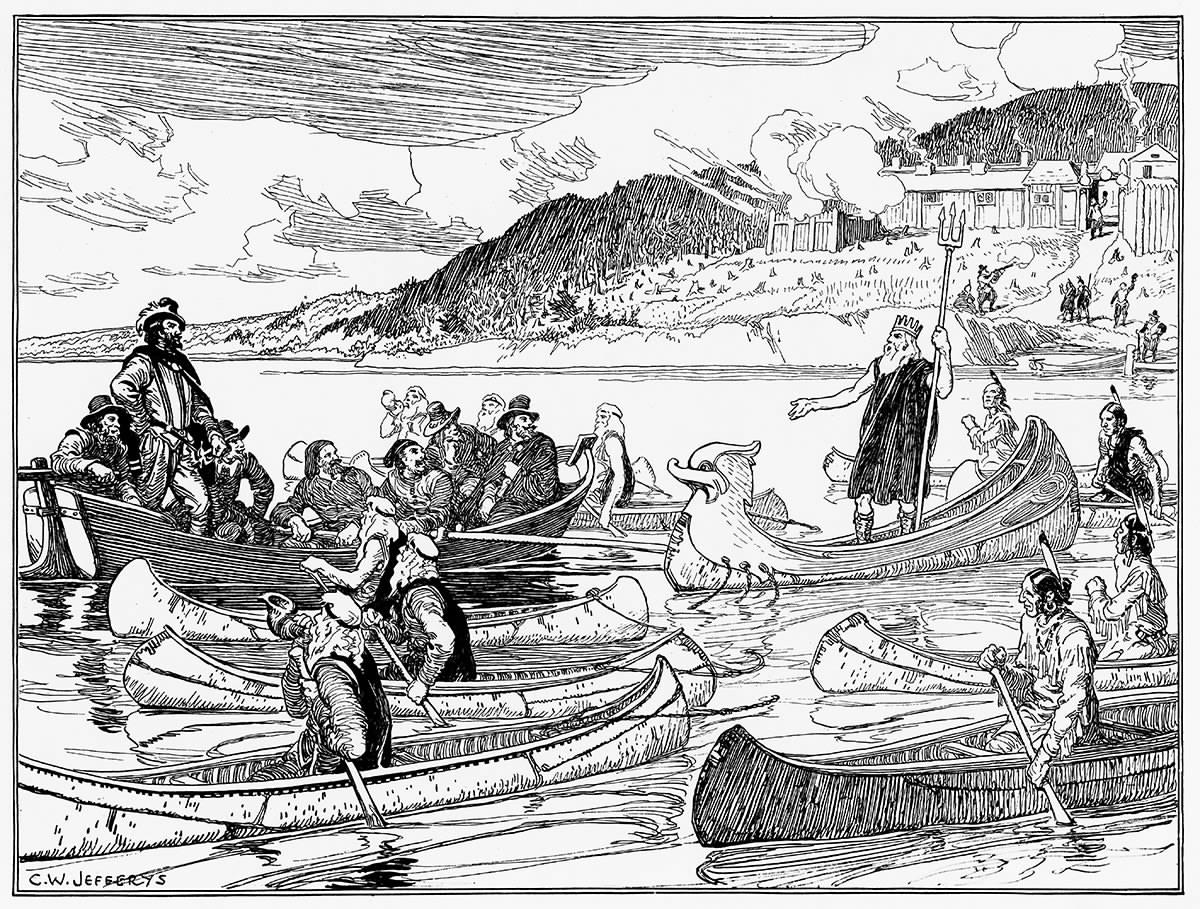
Presentation of the Théâtre de Neptune facing the Port-Royal dwelling. Drawing by Charles William Jefferys.

The empremier period, that is, the period of Acadian history before 1755, has few artists whose work has survived to the present day, and no professional organizations. Marc Lescarbot, however, produced the first literary texts in North America in 1606. Visitors such as Biard, Chrestien Le Clercq, Denys, Dièreville, Maillard and Bourg went on to write about the geography, flora and fauna of Acadia. Religious figures such as Abbé Saint-Vallier wrote about religious and economic conditions. The slow pace of population growth and Acadia's strategic location, which led to numerous wars, explain why the number of texts produced in Acadia is not comparable to that of Canada or France.

=== Deportation to renaissance ===
The deportation of the Acadians took place from 1755 to 1763, but the population did not fully recover until the 1820s. Acadian culture and society were slowly rebuilt, a period sometimes referred to as the Hundred Years in the Woods, with no literature but a flourishing oral tradition that has left stories, legends and songs to this day. A school system began to take shape in the mid-19th century, and Collège Saint-Joseph was founded in Memramcook in 1854. Its graduates became actively involved in their community and, aided by the clergy, were concerned with their identity and aspirations in a society now dominated by a majority of Anglo-Protestants.

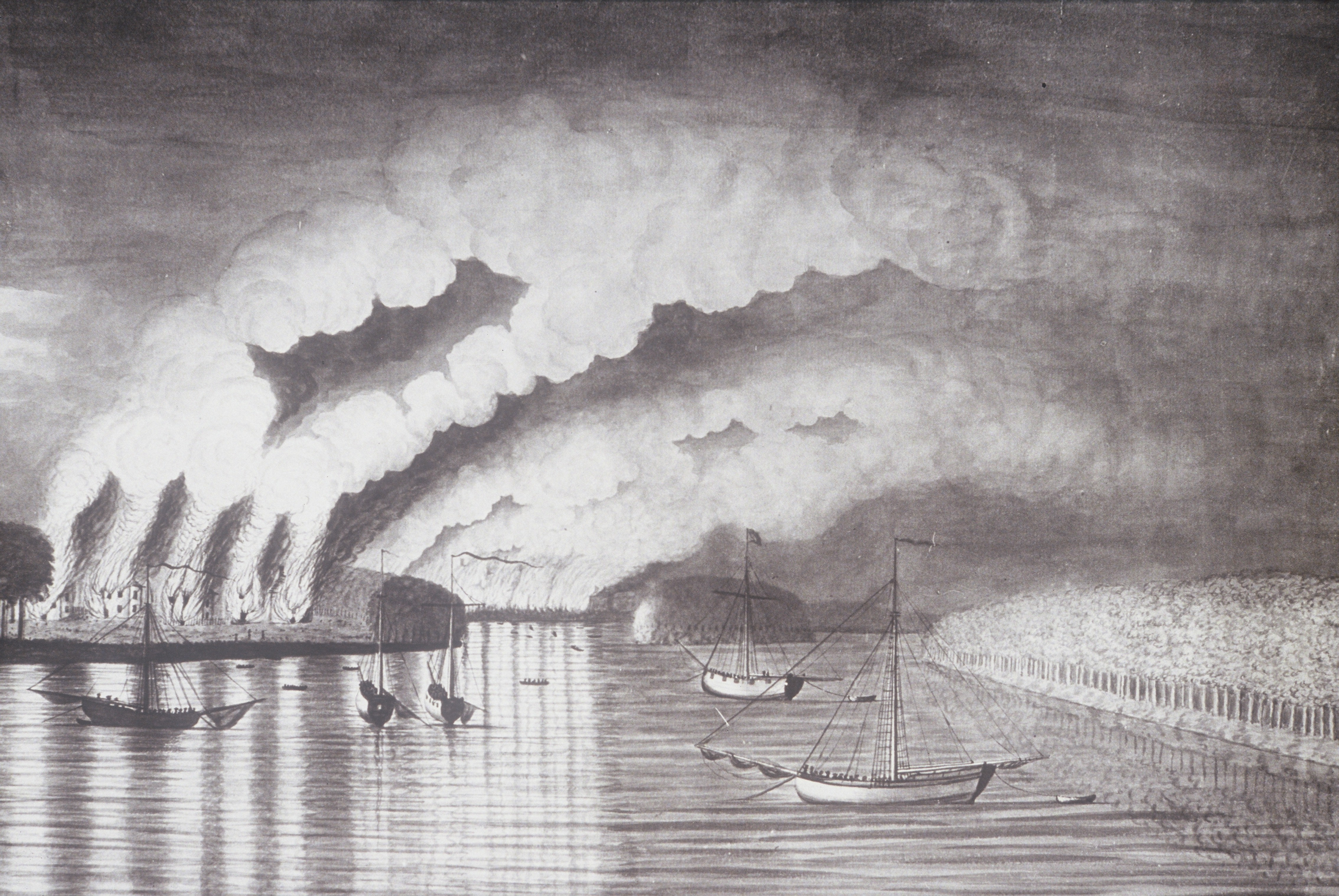
View of the sacking and burning of the city of Grimrose, the only known contemporary depiction of the deportation of the Acadians, by Thomas Davies, 1758.

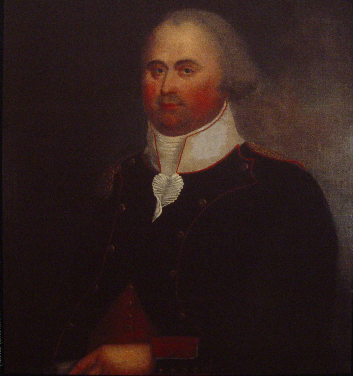
Portrait of Pierre Douville (1745-1794), deported at the age of 13. Painted around 1790, this is one of the few known portraits of a survivor of the deportation.

=== Renaissance to 1950s ===
The takeover of society, the economy and politics by graduates of Collège Saint-Joseph and the clergy was revived by the Acadian National Conventions, the first of which was held in Memramcook in 1881. The nationalist debate, inspired by the works of François-Edme Rameau de Saint-Père and stimulated by Quebec clergy, dominated literature until 1966. Present in priests' sermons, discussions and the media - L'Évangéline and Le Moniteur acadien - the debate encompassed politics, economics and society. The rediscovery of their history inspires Acadians, an area where Pascal Poirier stands out in his writings. The nationalist debate dominates cultural production, while seeking to heal the trauma of the Acadian deportation and redefine Acadian identity.

Strictly speaking, there was no social class that could afford patronage until the Acadian Renaissance of the 19th century, when the clergy took on this role.

Until the beginning of the 20th century, sculpture and painting were mainly carried out by church decorators, some of them self-taught. Among the principal works still in existence are those of Philomène Belliveau, Caroline Léger, Anna Bourque-Bourgeois, Jeanne Léger, Alma Buote and Yolande Boudreau, all of whom studied art abroad. Sainte-Anne-de-Kent Church, which included paintings by Édouard Gautreau, was nicknamed the “Sistine Chapel of Acadia” until it was destroyed by fire in 2007. From the 1930s onwards, Quebec physician Paul Carmel Laporte taught sculpture and drawing in Edmundston and trained several artists, including Claude Picard, Claude Roussel and Marie Hélène Allain.

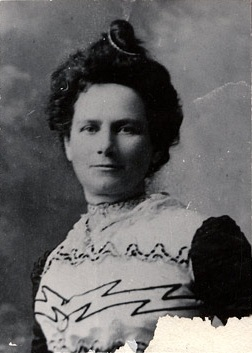
Philomène Belliveau.]]

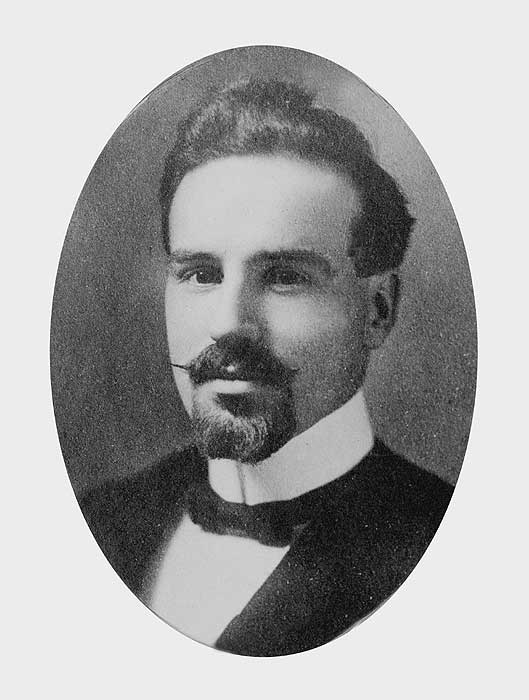
Paul Carmel Laporte.

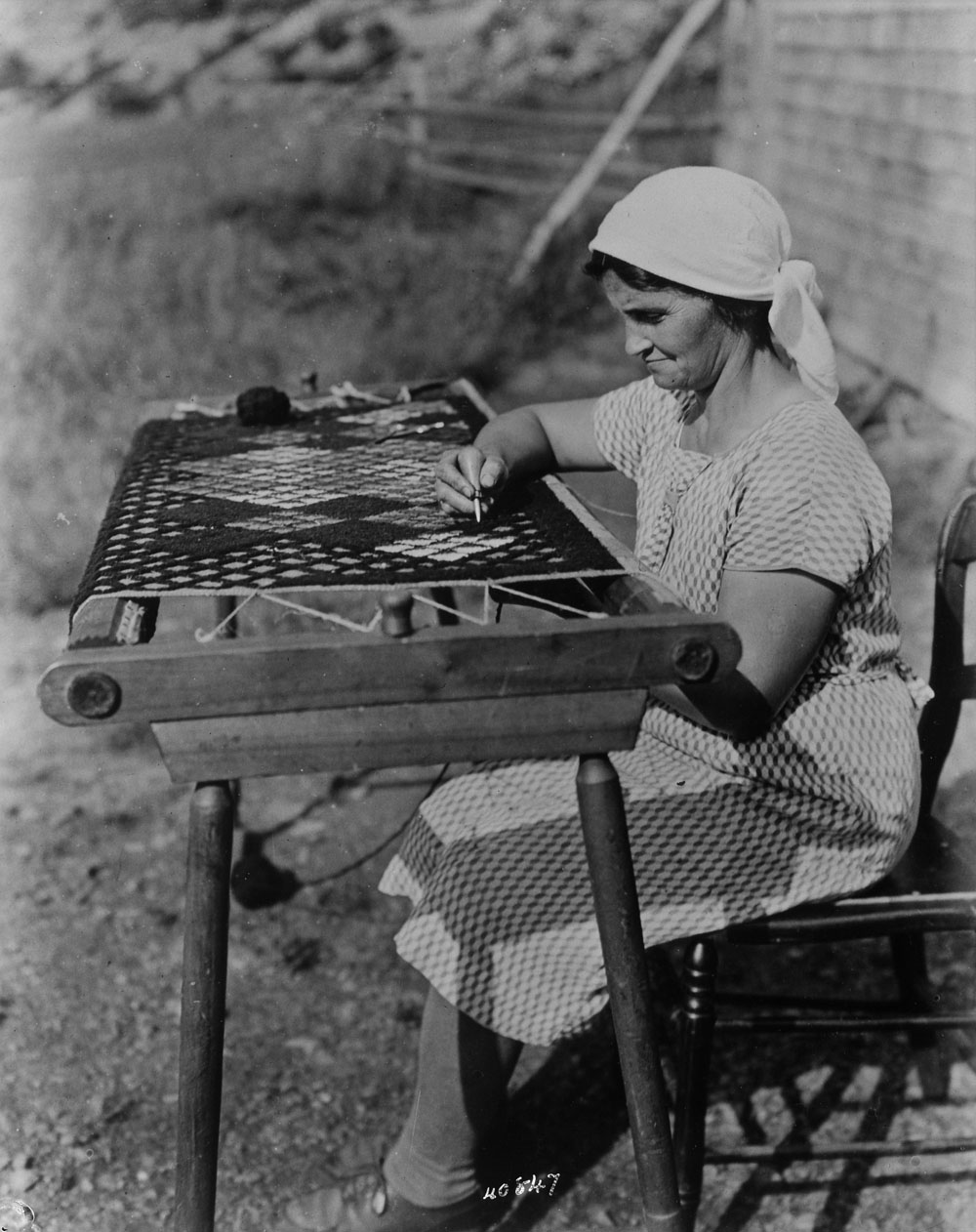
Acadian lady making a rug, 1938.

The rug hooking technique was introduced in Chéticamp after 1875 and commercialized around 1923 by the American Lillian Burke. Most designs were mass-produced, but some hookers, such as Elizabeth Lefort, made a name for themselves with murals such as The Last Supper.

=== 1950s to 1980s ===
The nationalist debate is no longer central to Acadian thought, as the very existence of the Acadian community is no longer in question. Against the backdrop of the radical movements of the 1960s, the Quiet Revolution in Quebec and Louis Robichaud's Equal Opportunity program, the Rassemblement des jeunes in 1966 challenged the nationalist debate and rejected traditional Acadian culture. Student strikes and nuits de la poésie (poetry nights) also encouraged this movement, as did the great success of Antonine Maillet's La Sagouine, the popularity of chansonniers, the publication of young authors and the founding of Éditions d'Acadie. During this period of “return to Beaubassin”, Acadian artists from the North moved to Moncton, a situation explained by the presence of the studios of the Société Radio-Canada and the National Film Board, but above all by the influence of the Université de Moncton. This movement continued into the 1980s, but despite some cinematic successes, censorship, funding problems and commercialism took their toll.

According to Patrick Condom Laurette and Claude Roussel, Acadia's political situation and the folkloric nature of its art leave little room for the future. Moreover, a residual aspect of Acadia as popular culture, represented by works such as Evangéline, sometimes still inspires artists, notably Antonine Maillet with Évangéline Deusse (1975) and Roméo Savoie with his painting Seal of Approval (1978) and his poem Eurydice voyeuse (1981). In 1982, the same artist confronted nothingness with The Great Acadian Fan (1982). On the other hand, a “certain style” of anti-modernism, “folkesque” in appearance, inspired by commercial concern and the media, derived from the work of 19th-century Quebec religious painters and later woodcarvers, inspired sculptors such as Claude Roussel and Raymond Martin. The 1980s were a decade of malaise for many Acadians, and the 1981 exhibition Acadia Nova marked the beginning of a period when artists were "de-Acadianizing" their work, for, in the words of Philippe Doucet, “the child that Acadia had been for several centuries had now passed the stage of adolescence”.

It was not until the 1960s that genuine patronage initiatives were undertaken, although the Church of Christ the King, designed in 19?? by Yvon Roy in Moncton, prefigured this period.

Claude Roussel set up the visual arts department at the Université de Moncton in 1963, providing structured training for artists. The university's rector, Clément Cormier, tried to “get Acadians out of their little folkloric remnant”. At the same time, many artists, including Gertrude Godbout, Eulalie Boudreau, René Hébert, Georges Goguen, Roméo Savoie, Hilda Lavoie-Frachon and Claude Gauvin, were still required to take outside courses before pursuing their careers in Acadia. Some, including Claude Picard and Ernest Cormier, created religious paintings and murals for churches. Marie-Hélène Allain's environmental stone sculptures are displayed in many public buildings. Nelson Surette makes a name for himself with paintings depicting daily life. Adrien Arsenault is also well known. Nérée De Grâce draws her inspiration from Acadian folklore, and her paintings can be found in collections around the world, as well as on a 1981 stamp. Canadian museums hold works by other artists, the best-known of whom are sculptors Arthur Gallant, Alfred Morneault and Octave Verret, and painters Léo B. LeBlanc, Médard Cormier and Camille Cormier.

=== 1980s to present ===
The Université de Moncton art gallery opened in 1980, at a time when many artists were still based in Montreal or Halifax.

In 1987, Claude Picard and Claude Roussel created the paintings and bas-reliefs for the Grand-Pré National Historic Site. A new generation of artists took their place, inspired by modern concerns as well as other subjects: Paul-Édouard Bourque, Jacques Arseneault, Francis Coutellier, Marc Cyr, Pierre Noël LeBlanc, Anne-Marie Sirois, Lucille Robichaud, Lionel Cormier, Luc A. Charette, Daniel Dugas, Guy Duguay, Roger Vautour, Ghislaine McLaughlin, Gilles LeBlanc, Georges Blanchette, Gilles Arsenault, Hélène LaRoche and André Lapointe. In addition to film, literature and theater, Herménégilde Chiasson is also a distinguished painter. Yvon Gallant is another well known Acadian painter. Robert Saucier, Jocelyn Jean and Paul-Émile Saulnier are considered Acadian artists, even though they decided to settle in Quebec.

In 1990, the Croix-Bleue company censored Luc Charette's Stairway to Heaven, showing a crucifix on a fighter plane.

== See also ==
- Acadian culture
- History of the Acadians
- Acadian folklore
- Acadieman
- Société Nationale de l'Acadie

== Bibliography ==
- Dupont, Jean-Claude (1977). Héritage d'Acadie [Heritage of Acadia] (in French). Montreal: Leméac.
- Dupont, Jean-Claude (1978). Histoire populaire de l'Acadie [Popular historty of Acadia] (in French). Montreal: Leméac. ISBN 2-7609-5278-9.
- Gair, Revley (1986). Langues et littératures au Nouveau-Brunswick : survol historique [Languages and Literatures in New Brunswick: A Historical Overview] (in French). Moncton: Éditions d'Acadie. ISBN 2-7600-0129-6.
- Gallant, Janine; Raymond, Maurice (2012). Dictionnaire des œuvres littéraires de l'Acadie des maritimes du XXe siècle [Dictionary of Maritime Acadian Literary Works of the 20th Century] (in French). Sudbury: Prise de parole. ISBN 978-2-89423-241-5.
- Jolicoeur, Catherine (1980). Les plus belles légendes acadiennes [The most beautiful Acadian legends] (in French). Montreal: Stanké.
- Labelle, Ronald; Léger, Lauraine, eds. (1982). En r'montant la tradition : hommage au père Anselme Chiasson [Building on tradition: a tribute to Father Anselme Chiasson] (in French). Moncton: Éditions d'Acadie.
- Condom Laurette, Patrick (1993). "Aspects historique de l'art en Acadie" [Historical aspects of art in Acadia]. In Daigle, Jean (ed.). L'Acadie des Maritimes [Acadia of the Maritimes] (in French). Moncton: Centre d'études acadiennes, Université de Moncton. pp. 789–844. ISBN 2921166062.
- Lonergan, David (2010). Paroles d'Acadie : Anthologie de la littérature acadienne (1958-2009) [Words from Acadia: Anthology of Acadian literature (1958-2009)] (in French). Sudbury: Prise de parole. ISBN 978-2-89423-256-9.
- Maillet, Marguerite (1983). Histoire de la littérature acadienne : de rêve en rêve [History of Acadian literature: from dream to dream] (in French). Moncton: Éditions d'Acadie.
- Maillet, Marguerite; Leblanc, Gérald; Emont, Bernard (1992). Anthologie de textes littéraires acadiens : 1606-1975 [Anthology of Acadian literary texts: 1606-1975] (in French). Moncton: Éditions d'Acadie. ISBN 2-7600-0228-4.
- Plantier, René (1996). Le corps du déduit : Neuf études sur la poésie acadienne, 1980-1990 [The body of the deduced: Nine Studies on Acadian Poetry, 1980-1990] (in French). Moncton: Éditions d'Acadie. ISBN 978-2-7600-0291-3.
