= Douville (disambiguation) =

Douville is a commune in the Dordogne department in Nouvelle-Aquitaine in southwestern France.

Douville may also refer to:

== Persons ==
- Alain Douville (1950–2025), French footballer
- Claudine Douville, a Québécoise sports journalist, amateur athlete and author of adventure novels
- Jean Baptiste Douville (1794–1837), a French world traveller
- Joseph Henri Ferdinand Douvillé (1846–1937), also known as "Henri Douvillé", a French paleontologist, geologist and malacologist
- Pierre Douville (1745–1794), a French-Canadian naval Captain and Lieutenant who served in the American Revolution and French Revolution

== Geography ==
- Douville-en-Auge, a commune in the Calvados department in the Normandy region in northwestern France
- Douville-sur-Andelle, a commune in the Eure department in northern France
- Douville River, a tributary of the Gatineau River in La Tuque, Quebec, Canada
