= Cross Point =

Cross Point and variants may refer to:

== Places ==
- Cross Point (Lowell, Massachusetts), an office tower in the United States
- Cross Point, a subdivision in Owings, Maryland, United States
- Cross Point Road in Edgecomb, Maine, United States

== Other ==
- Crosspoint (film), 2024
- Crosspoint (TV series), a 1977 Canadian television show
- Cross-point screw, or Phillips screw
- Crossbar switch, also called a cross-point switch
- Cross Point (album), by Casiopea, 1981

== See also ==
- Crosspointe, Virginia, United States
- Point Cross, Nova Scotia, Canada
