= French ship Bon Papa =

The Bon Papa (French: literally "good daddy" but means "grandfather".) was a French frigate of approximately 280 ton displacement in the late 18th century. The majority of records regarding the ship come from its participation in the relocation of the people who were to become known as Cajuns. Bon Papa was the first of seven ships that took part in the relocation of Acadians from France to Spanish Louisiana in 1785. On May 10 of that year, under the command of Captain Pelletier, it departed from Nantes, France, carrying 34 families, a total of 156 Acadians, to Louisiana. They arrived at New Orleans on July 29, 1785. The voyage took 81 days. Though they encountered only favorable weather and the ship was free of disease, one death was reported during the crossing; a young daughter of Eustache Govin. After arriving in New Orleans, the group increased by 12 (3 births, and 9 adults) and decreased by 13 (10 died, and 3 deserted). There were 38 family groupings when it came time to settle down: 37 of them settled in the area around St. Gabriel, Louisiana, along the Mississippi River, and 1 family chose to settle along Bayou Lafourche.

== See also ==
- History of the Acadians
- Cajuns
