= Edward Langille =

Canadian academic

Edward M. Langille
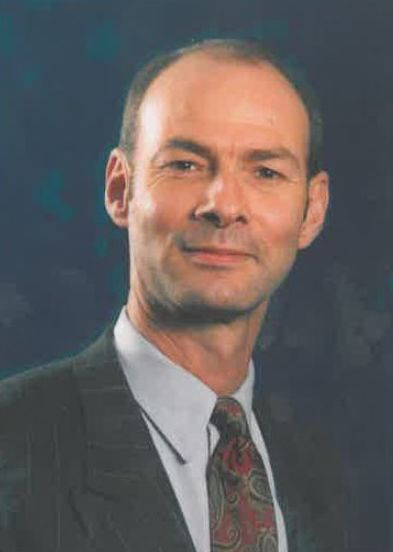
- Edward Langille, c. 2005
- Born: April 11, 1959 (age 67)
- Occupations: Professor, Modern Languages (French language and literature)
- Known for: Enlightenment studies including Voltaire; Expertise on Acadian culture and history

Edward M. Langille (born 1959) is a Canadian scholar, who has been a professor of Modern Languages (French language and literature) at St. Francis Xavier University in Antigonish, Nova Scotia, since 1989. He specializes in the area of Enlightenment studies, and is one of Canada’s leading experts on Voltaire and his works. He is the North American correspondent for Société des études voltairiennes, an international organization that promotes and coordinates research, events and publications relating to Voltaire. Langille also specializes in studies of Acadian culture and history.

Edward Langille received his undergraduate degree from Université Sainte-Anne, Nova Scotia's only French language university, in 1980. He earned his most advanced degree, a D.ès.L. (Doctor of Letters), from Université Paris III – Sorbonne Nouvelle in 1987. Langille’s contributions to scholarship and culture were acknowledged by the French Government in 2004, when he was named Chevalier in the Ordre des Palmes Académiques, as well as Chevalier in the Ordre des Arts et des Lettres. On February 1, 2013, he was awarded the Queen Elizabeth II Diamond Jubilee Medal for services to scholarship, education and culture. He also publishes under the name Édouard Langille.

== Education and teaching ==
Edward Langille was born on April 11, 1959, in St. Catharines, Ontario, and grew up in the village of Londonderry Mines in Colchester County, Nova Scotia. He attended public schools in the area. He received his Bachelor of Arts degree in modern languages from Université Sainte-Anne in Pointe-de-l'Église, Nova Scotia, in 1980 and earned two degrees in French literature, L. ès L. and M. ès L. from the Université de Nantes in 1982 and 1983. In 1984, he was awarded an additional modern languages degree (D.E.A.) from Université Paris III – Sorbonne Nouvelle. The following year, he earned a master's degree in international history from the London School of Economics writing his Master's thesis on the French Socialist party in the years immediately before World War I. In 1987, Langille completed a doctoral dissertation at Université Paris III – Sorbonne Nouvelle on the medieval French translations of William, archbishop of Tyre, working under the direction of the late French medievalist Jean Dufournet. The title of the thesis is La Représentation de l’Islam et du monde musulman chez Guillaume de Tyr. (The Portrayal of Islam and of the Muslim World in the French Chronicles of William of Tyre.)

After graduating from Sorbonne with his D.ès.L. (Doctor of Letters), Langille taught at the University of Victoria and Université Ste-Anne, before being hired in the Modern Languages department at St. Francis Xavier University in 1989. In 2016, Langille was named to a two-year term as the Jules Léger Research Chair in the Humanities and Social Sciences at St FX. He was appointed in 2017 to a three-year position as contributing editor to The Year's Work in Modern Language Studies (YWMLS).

== Scholarly research ==
=== Candide: Sources and origins ===
Edward Langille has conducted extensive research on the sources and origins of Voltaire's 1759 satiric masterpiece Candide. He argues, in part, that Candide draws on Pierre-Antoine de La Place's 1750 novel, Histoire de Tom Jones, ou l’enfant trouvé, a French adaptation of Henry Fielding's The History of Tom Jones, a Foundling. "A close reading of Candide and L'Enfant trouvé," Langille has written, "reveals an astonishing network of verbal, thematic and narrative analogies, which strongly reinforces the thesis that Voltaire's novel owes a great deal to La Place, in terms of the characters it portrays, the narrative that binds those characters together, and the language in which the whole is expressed." Elsewhere, Langille has noted that La Place's adaptation eliminates Fielding's "consistent, all-pervasive irony" replacing it with "emotional self-indulgence" and conferring "a rosy cast on Fielding's love themes." He argues that Voltaire created Candide as a parody of the contemporary sentimental romance, the prevailing philosophy of Optimism and possibly, Fielding's own faith in "the controlling hand of Providence".

In addition, Langille argues that Candide reflects elements of a second book, Le Cosmopolite; ou, le Citoyen du monde, the memoirs of Louis-Charles Fougeret de Monbron, also published in 1750. Noting the cynical tone, sarcastic humour and salacious sexual allusions of Le Cosmopolite, Langille suggests Monbron's memoirs provided Voltaire with anecdotes, descriptions and idiosyncratic expressions that were useful in creating Candide. Moreover, he writes, parts of Candide are based on Monbron's extensive travels and the many incidents he relates.

Langille's 2013 book is a critical edition of La Place’s translation of Tom Jones.

=== Chéticamp hooked rugs ===
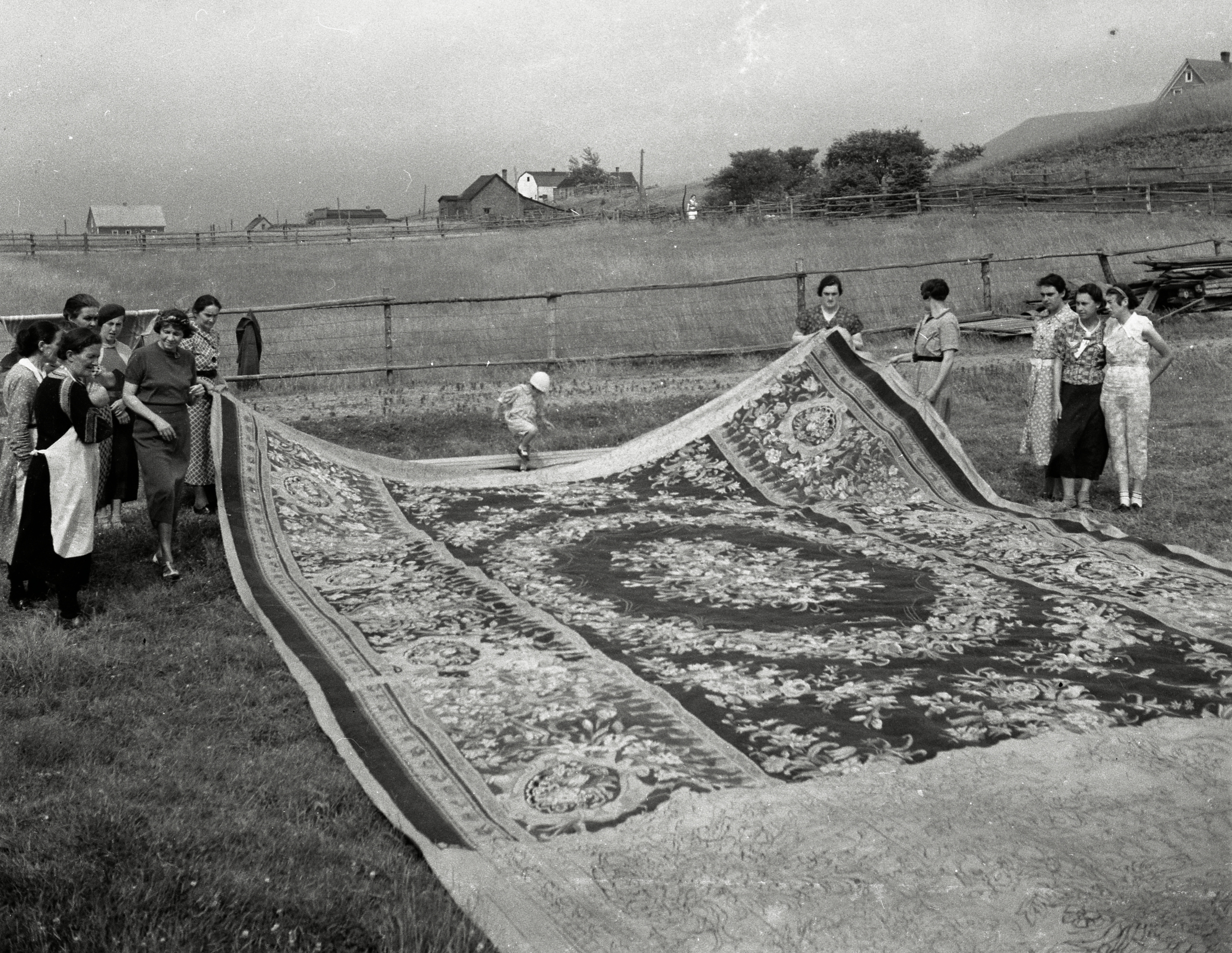
Lillian Burke, standing left, with short bob haircut, shown with 648 sq. ft. hooked rug, reputed to be the largest ever created

In July 2011, Langille discovered more than 125 hand-painted designs for hooked rugs in an antique shop in New Glasgow, Nova Scotia. The designs, created by the little-known American artist and teacher Lillian Burke (1880–1952), form part of the unique culture and history of the small, mainly French-speaking community of Chéticamp, Cape Breton. Langille donated the designs to Cape Breton University's Beaton Institute and began conducting extensive research on Lillian Burke's life as well as her contributions to a cottage industry that helped sustain the impoverished community during the Great Depression of the 1930s.

Langille's book on Burke's life and career, The Story of Lillian Burke was published in 2019.

== Advocacy for cultural heritage ==
=== Government House renovation ===
Aside from his scholarly research and teaching, Edward Langille has demonstrated his concern for preserving Nova Scotia's cultural heritage. In 2008, for example, he wrote to the Lieutenant Governor to complain about renovations to Government House. The Lieutenant Governor's official residence in downtown Halifax was built between 1799 and 1805. Langille's letter criticized the decision to replace old plaster walls with drywall and noted that in England, great pains are taken to restore old buildings to their original condition. "Sadly, in the less noble city of Halifax, where heritage groups are treated with derision, history is carted away in a Dumpster, without public outcry," Langille wrote.

=== Document donations ===
In 2010, Langille acquired documents from an antique dealer that had once belonged to Nova Scotia's distinguished Desbarres family and donated them to the province's Public Archives. The documents included a royal land grant or deed to the DesBarres family and a rare early-19th-century plan of the Town of Guysborough. "I acquired them slowly through negotiations over a long, long period," Langille told a reporter, "Finally he agreed to sell them to me at a price I could afford. My objective was to donate them to the public archives. I always felt they belonged in the public archives." Langille added that although people value old objects such as furniture or crockery, they tend not to value old paper artifacts, which are potentially much more interesting. "I know, for example, I have bought, over time, boxes of letters at auctions or sales and you’ll get letters from guys who were overseas for the war writing home. These were all preserved by families and they’ve come down to us and give us an absolute, unique glimpse into someone’s mind into a time in history that is vanishing. There are very few people who are alive today who can talk about it but the letters still keep these things, in a way, fresh."

== St. F.X. faculty strike ==
In January and February 2013, Langille crossed the picket lines when his union, the St. F.X. Association of University Teachers, went on strike for three weeks after eight months without a contract. A few days before the strike, Langille had vowed he would continue to teach classes. A news report quoted him as saying, "I may not have a contract with the university, but my course outline is my contract with students and by God I’ll respect it." On the first day of the strike, Langille told a CBC Radio interviewer that the union was making excessive demands and that students were being held hostage to a difference of opinion between unions at the university and its administrators. He noted that during his 25 years teaching at St. F.X., campus facilities and salaries had improved immensely and that faculty unhappy with pay levels were free to apply for academic jobs elsewhere. In an interview posted in five parts on the website of the St. F.X, student newspaper The Xaverian, Langille said he did not believe university faculty should strike for more money. "I really believe, and some people may find this bizarre, but I really believe that a captain doesn’t abandon the ship, a doctor doesn’t abandon the sick, and I really believe the professors shouldn’t abandon students," he added.

== Selected publications ==
- Histoire de Tom Jones, ou l'enfant trouvé (1750). Adaptation de Pierre-Antoine de la Place, éditéé par Édouard Langille. Paris: Classiques Garniers, 2013. [P]
- Voltaire, Aventure Indienne, édition prepare par Édouard Langille, Les Oeuvres Completes de Voltaire, Oxford, Voltaire Foundation, 57A, 2013. [P]
- Voltaire, Les Aveugles, juges des couleurs, édition prepare par Édouard Langille, Les Oeuvres Completes de Voltaire, Oxford, Voltaire Foundation, 57A, 2013. [P]
- Fougeret de Monbron, Le Cosmopolite, ou le citoyen du monde (1750), nouvelle édition préparée avec introduction par É. Langille. Notes et commentaires par É. Langille, Modern Humanists Research Association, spring 2010.
- Candide en Dannemarc ou l’optimisme des honnêtes gens (Genève, 1767) nouvelle édition préparée avec introduction par É. Langille. Notes et commentaires par É. Langille, University of Durham Press-Modern Language Series, 2008. 192p (reprinted 2010 University of Manchester Press)
- Dulaurens, Henri-Joseph, Candide ou optimisme, seconde partie 1760, nouvelle édition préparée avec introduction par É. Langille. Notes et commentaires par É. Langille et G. Pink, University of Exeter Press : Textes littéraires, 2003. 89p.
