= French ship Ville d'Archangel =

History

France
- Name: Ville d'Archangel
- Fate: Wrecked

General characteristics
- Tons burthen: 600 tons

The Ville d'Archangel was a 600-ton ship that wrecked. It left St. Malo, France on August 12, 1785, transporting 303 Acadians to Louisiana. It ran aground at Balize, and landed at New Orleans on December 3, 1785. Fifteen passengers died en route.

The ship ran aground when it reached La Balize, an outpost at the mouth of the Mississippi River, on November 4. The ship arrived in New Orleans on December 3, 1785 after 113 days at sea. When it landed, there were 60 Acadian families aboard for a total of 299 people. During the voyage there were 15 deaths and 2 desertions. There were also 7 marriages, 11 adult additions, and 2 births.

== See also ==
- History of the Acadians
- Cajuns
