= Jean-Mandé Sigogne =

French Catholic priest (1763–1844)

- Born: 6 April 1763; Beaulieu-lès-Loches, France
- Died: 9 November 1844 (aged 81); Church Point, Nova Scotia, Canada
- Occupation: Priest
- Known for: Missionary work among Acadians and Mi'kmaw

Jean-Mandé Sigogne (6 April 1763 – 9 November 1844) was a French Catholic priest, educator, and civil official who served as a missionary to the Acadian and Mi'kmaw communities of southwestern Nova Scotia following the French Revolution. Fleeing religious persecution in France, Sigogne spent seven years in England before arriving in Nova Scotia in 1799. Over forty-five years, he established several parishes, oversaw the construction of seven churches, built early schools, and advocated for the land rights and civil liberties of local Mi'kmaq and Acadian populations.

== Life ==
=== Early life and French Revolution (1763–1792) ===
Jean-Mandé Sigogne was born on 6 April 1763 in Beaulieu-lès-Loches, Touraine, France. He was educated at the Petit Séminaire de Tours and completed his theological studies before being ordained as a Catholic priest in 1787. He was subsequently appointed vicar of Manthelan in the Diocese of Tours.

During the French Revolution, Sigogne opposed the Civil Constitution of the Clergy. After preaching a sermon in the summer of 1790 that publicly condemned revolutionary religious policies, he fell out of favor with local Republican authorities.Refusing to take the constitutional oath, Sigogne went into hiding before secretly fleeing France in August 1792.

=== Exile in England (1792–1799) ===
Sigogne spent nearly seven years in exile in England, residing primarily in Rotherhithe, near London. To support himself, he learned English and earned a living teaching French, Latin, and Greek.

In 1798, Bishop Pierre Denaut of Quebec sought priests to serve the leaderless Acadian populations in Nova Scotia who had returned to the region following the Great Upheaval (1755–1763). Sigogne accepted the invitation, departing England on 14 April 1799 and arriving in Halifax on 12 June 1799. From Halifax, he traveled to St. Mary's Bay in southwestern Nova Scotia to begin his mission.

=== Ministry in Nova Scotia (1799–1844) ===
Upon his arrival, Sigogne assumed responsibility for two vast parishes—St. Mary's and St. Anne's—spanning the remote, scattered coastal communities of Digby and Yarmouth counties. For over four decades, he served not only as a religious leader but also as an educator, community organizer, and unofficial magistrate. Appointed a Justice of the Peace, Sigogne drafted legal agreements, settled local land disputes, and established early schools in the region.

Over the course of his ministry, Sigogne oversaw the construction of seven churches throughout southwestern Nova Scotia. Following the destruction of several buildings in the great fire of 1820, he led rebuilding efforts across the district. Among his completed structures was St. Joseph’s Church in Corberrie, constructed in 1841, which remains the only surviving original church from his tenure.

=== Advocacy for the Mi'kmaq ===
In addition to his work with Acadian settlers, Sigogne maintained a long-standing ministry among the local Mi'kmaw population, who referred to him as Nujjinen ("our father"). Fluent in English and French, he frequently acted as an intermediary between Mi'kmaw leaders and the Nova Scotia colonial administration.

In 1813, Sigogne petitioned the colonial government on behalf of Pierre Bernard to secure land rights. In 1818, he wrote letters of support recommending Andrew James Meuse for official recognition as chief of the local Mi'kmaq. Around 1831, he assisted in establishing a chapel for the Mi'kmaw community at Bear River. A bilingual Mi'kmaq-French catechism transcribed by Sigogne is preserved in the Library and Archives Canada in Ottawa.

=== Death and legacy ===
Sigogne died on 9 November 1844 in the sacristy of his church in Pointe-de-l'Église (Church Point), Nova Scotia, at the age of 81. A monument dedicated to his service stands in Clare, Nova Scotia.

== Notes ==
(3) Guy Frégault, "La déportation des Acadiens", Revue d'Histoire de l'Amérique française 8/3 (1954) pp. 349–350. Voir aussi Thomas B. Akins, "Extract from the minutes of the Proceedings of the Lords Commissioners of Trade and Plantations, December 3d, 1762.", Public Documents of the Province of Nova Scotia, Halifax, N.S., Charles Annand, 1869, pp. 337–338.(reprendre à 3) (4) Petit village à la Baie Sainte-Marie dans le comté de Digby, Nouvelle-Écosse.(reprendre à 4) (5) Placide P. Gaudet, "La Pointe-à-Major, berceau de la colonie de Clare", L'Évangéline (18 juin 1891).(reprendre à 5) (6) Joan Bourque Campbell, L'Histoire de la paroisse de Sainte-Anne-du-Ruisseau (Eel Brook), Yarmouth, Éditions Lescarbot, 1985, p. 13; et Clarence J. d'Entremont, Histoire de Wedgeport, N.-É., s.é., 1967, p. 6.(reprendre à 6) Aller à la bibliographie.

== Bibliography ==
- Gérald C. Boudreau. Le père Sigogne et les Acadiens du sud-ouest de la Nouvelle-Écosse. Monograph published by Éditions Bellarmin, St-Laurent (Quebec), May 1992, 230pp.

== See also ==
- History of the Acadians
