= History of the Acadians =

Acadia viewed from a historical point of view

Modern flag of Acadia, adopted 1884

The Acadians (French: Acadiens) are the descendants of 17th and 18th century French settlers in parts of Acadia (French: Acadie) in the northeastern region of North America comprising what is now the Canadian Maritime Provinces of New Brunswick, Nova Scotia and Prince Edward Island, the Gaspé peninsula in eastern Québec, and the Kennebec River in southern Maine.

The settlers whose descendants became Acadians primarily came from the southwestern and northern regions of France, historically known as Occitania and Normandy. Historically, the Acadians have been associated with the first settlers of Poitou, Angoumois, Aunis and Saintonge, however recent genealogical research has shown that many also came from northern France, from provinces such as Normandy and Brittany.

Today, due to assimilation, some Acadians may share other ethnic ancestries as well, notably Irish.

The history of the Acadians was significantly influenced by the six colonial wars that took place in Acadia during the 17th and 18th centuries (see the French and Indian Wars, Dummer's War and Conflicts in Nova Scotia, 1749–1755). Eventually, the last of the colonial wars—the French and Indian War—resulted in the British Expulsion of the Acadians from the region. After the war, many Acadians came out of hiding or returned to Acadia from the British colonies. Others remained in France and some migrated from there to Louisiana, where they became known as Cajuns, a corruption of the word Acadiens or Acadians. The nineteenth century saw the beginning of the Acadian Renaissance and the publication of Evangeline, which helped galvanize Acadian identity. In the last century, Acadians have made achievements in the areas of equal language and cultural rights as a minority group in the Maritime Provinces of Canada.

== Origins and settlement (1604–1713) ==
The first French attempt at colonisation was in 1604 at Saint Croix Island between present-day Maine and New Brunswick. This site was unsuitable, and in 1605, the Habitation at Port-Royal was built. There was a number of sailings from the French Atlantic Coast to Acadia between 1632 and 1636. In 1636 they were moved from LaHave (now in Nova Scotia) to Port Royal. There, in 1636, Pierre Martin and Catherine Vigneau, were the first European parents to have a child in Acadia, Mathieu Martin, who later became the Seigneury of Cobequid (1699).

From 1635–1654 the colony had two legitimate Lieutenant Governors: Charles de Menou d'Aulnay in Port Royal, and Charles de Saint-Étienne de la Tour in present-day Saint John. This led to internal fighting in the colony.

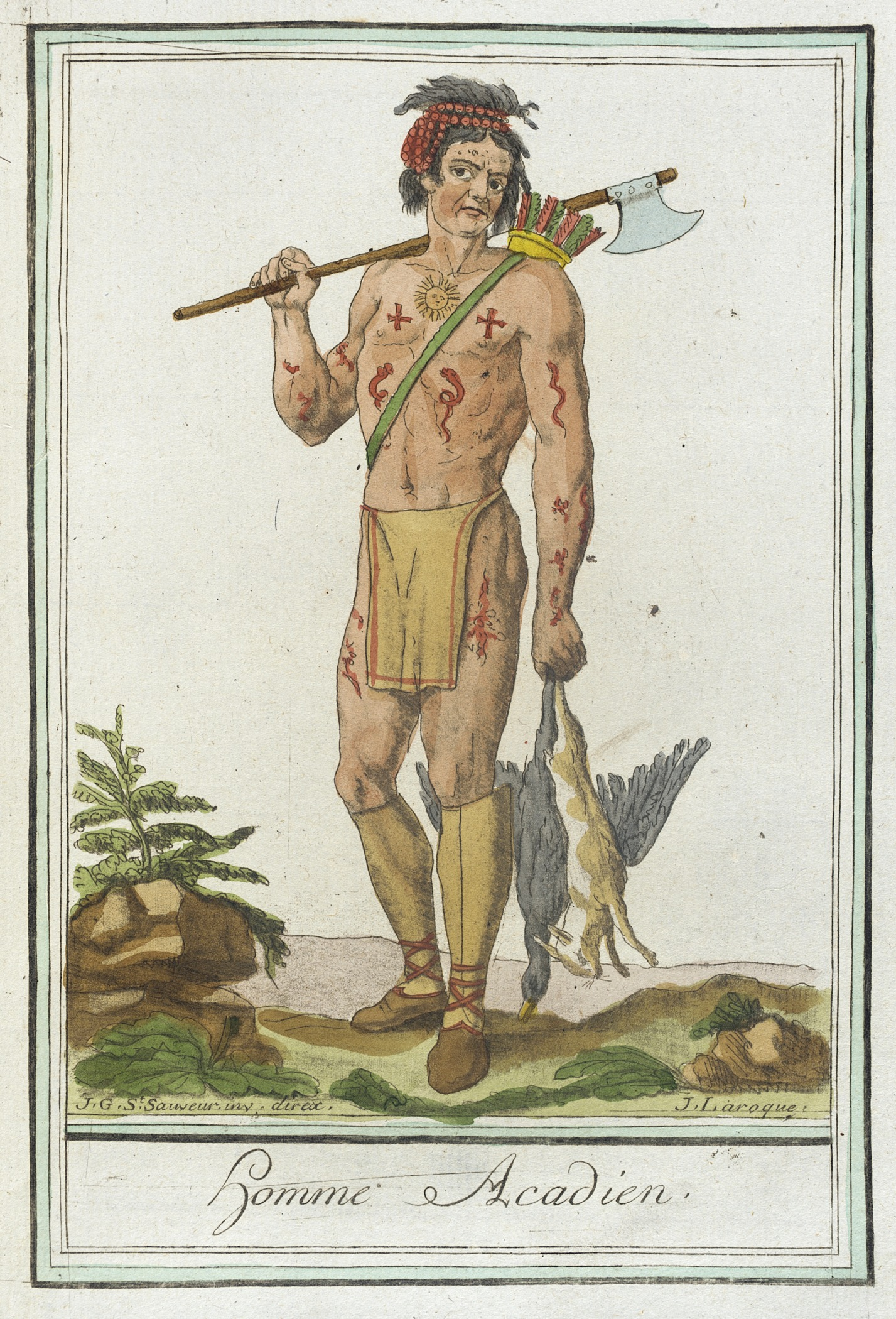
Mi'kmaq man depiction titled 'Homme Acadien' (Acadian Man) by Jacques Grasset de Saint-Sauveur. The Nova Scotia Museum description indicates: This Mi'kmaq man has light hair and European features; his accoutrements are also inaccurately depicted. The 1750 account of Swedish botanist Peter Kalm, or the eighteenth-century letters of the Abbé Pierre Antoine Simon Maillard, may be the artist's basis for this engraving; both mention Mi'kmaq men tattooed with crosses and suns. This engraving was published in an encyclopedia by J. Grasset St-Saveur, "ci-devant vice-consul de la Nation française en Hongrie."

The English invaded and occupied Acadia from 1654 to 1667, during which time there was no new French settlement. In 1670, according to the first census undertaken in Acadia there were approximately 60 Acadian families with approximately 300 inhabitants in total. These were predominantly engaged in aboiteau farming along the Bay of Fundy.

In 1671, more than 50 colonists sailed from La Rochelle. Towards the end of the 1600s, Acadians spread out and established Grand Pré, Chignecto, Cobequid and Pisiguit. In 1710, the English captured Portal Royal. The Mi'kmaq held the military strength in Acadia even after 1710.

== Acadian neutrality (1713–1749) ==
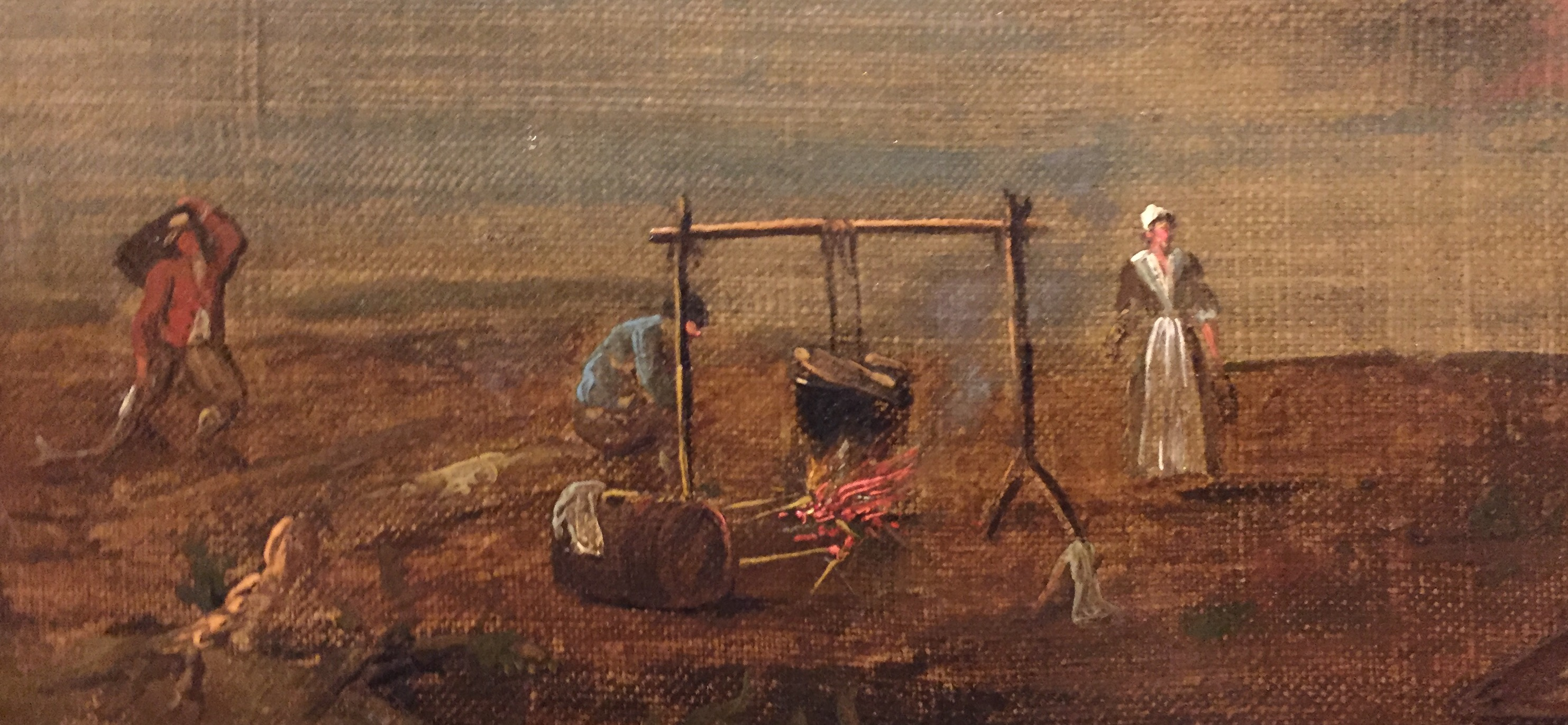
Acadians at Annapolis Royal by Samuel Scott, 1751; earliest known image of Acadians

Under the terms of the 1713 Treaty of Utrecht, France ceded peninsular Acadia (roughly today's mainland Nova Scotia) to Britain, while keeping Île-Royale (Cape Breton), Île-Saint-Jean (PEI), and Canada. Acadia's status had been contested before; after Utrecht it was, on paper, British.

There was already a long history of Acadian and Wabanaki Confederacy resistance to the British occupation of Acadia during the four French and Indian Wars and two local wars (Father Rale's War and Father Le Loutre's War) before the Expulsion of the Acadians. The Mi'kmaq and the Acadians were allies through Catholicism and through numerous inter-marriages.

Although not common, on occasion epidemics ravished the population of Ile St.-Jean, Ile Royale and Acadia. In 1732/33 more than 150 people died of smallpox on Ile Royale.

While many Acadians traded with the New England Protestants, Acadians' participation in the wars clearly indicated that many were reluctant to be ruled by the British. During the first colonial war, King William's War (1688–97), the crews of the very successful French privateer Pierre Maisonnat dit Baptiste were primarily Acadian. The Acadians resisted during the Raid on Chignecto (1696). During Queen Anne's War, Mi’kmaq and Acadians resisted during the Raid on Grand Pré, Piziquid and Chignecto in 1704. The Acadians also assisted the French in protecting the capital in the Siege of Port Royal (1707) and the final Conquest of Acadia. The Acadians and Mi’kmaq were also successful in the Battle of Bloody Creek (1711).

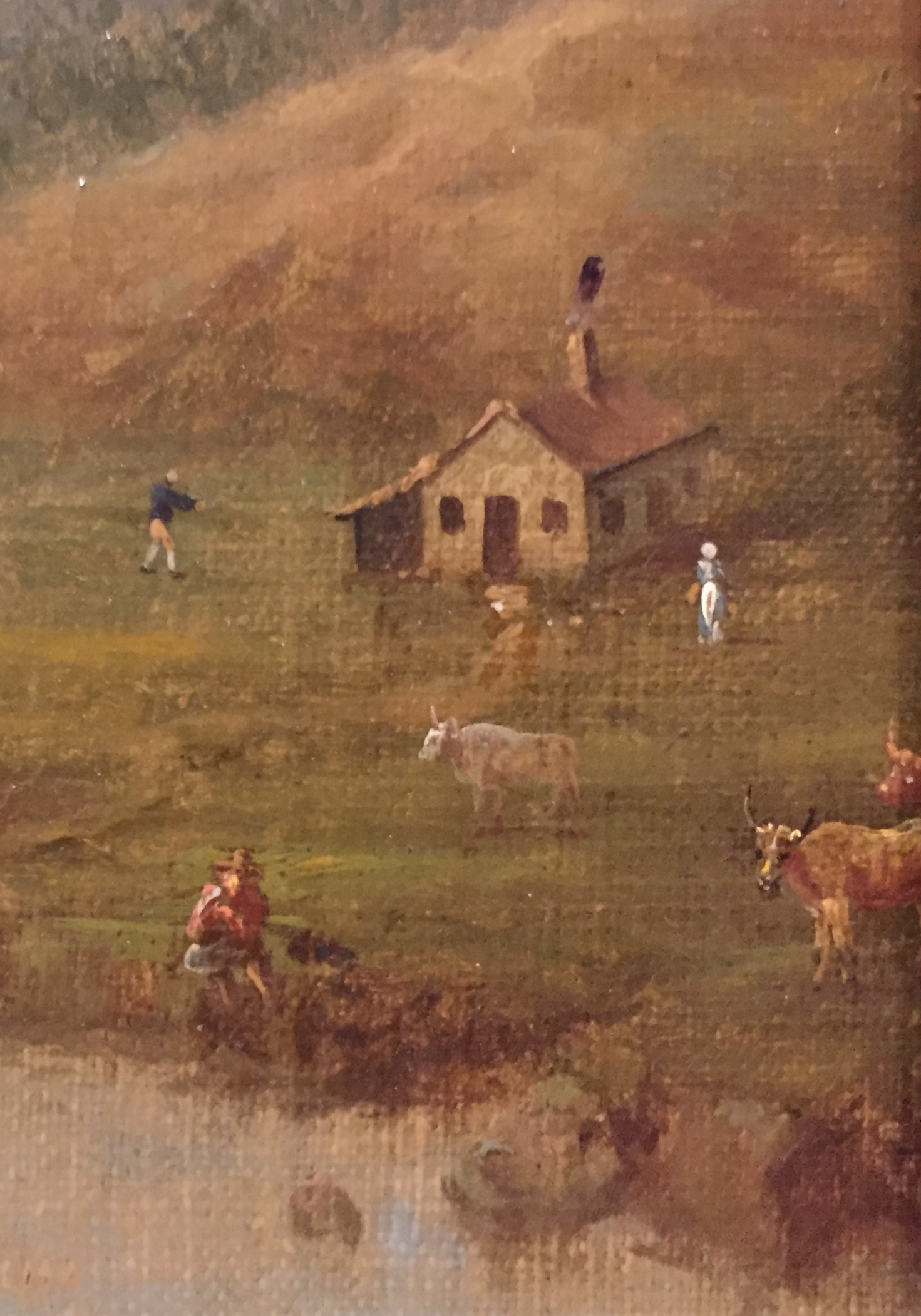
Acadians by Samuel Scott, Annapolis Royal, 1751

During Father Rale's War, the Maliseet raided numerous vessels on the Bay of Fundy while the Mi'kmaq engaged in the Raid on Canso, Nova Scotia (1723). In the latter engagement, the Mi'kmaq were aided by Acadians. During King George's War, Abbe Jean-Louis Le Loutre led many efforts which involved both Acadians and Mi’kmaq to recapture the capital such as the Siege of Annapolis Royal (1744). During this siege, French officer Marin had taken British prisoners and stopped with them further up the bay at Cobequid. While at Cobequid, an Acadian said that the French soldiers should have "left their [the English] carcasses behind and brought their skins". Le Loutre was also joined by prominent Acadian resistance leader Joseph Broussard (Beausoleil). Broussard and other Acadians were involved in supporting the French soldiers in the Battle of Grand Pré.

During Father Le Loutre’s War, the conflict continued. The Mi'kmaq attacked New England Rangers in the Siege of Grand Pré and Battle at St. Croix. Upon the founding of Dartmouth, Nova Scotia, Broussard and the Mi'kmaq conducted numerous raids on the village, such as the Raid on Dartmouth (1751), to try to stop the Protestant migration into Nova Scotia. (Similarly, during the French and Indian War, Mi’kmaq, Acadians and Maliseet also engaged in numerous raids on Lunenburg, Nova Scotia, to stop the migration, such as the Raid on Lunenburg (1756).) Le Loutre and Broussard also worked together to resist the British occupation of Chignecto (1750) and then later they fought together with Acadians in the Battle of Beausejour (1755). (As early as the summer of 1751, La Valiere reported, approximately 250 Acadians had already enrolled in the local militia at Fort Beausejour.)

When Charles Lawrence took over the post following Hopson’s return to England, he took a stronger stance. He was not only a government official but a military leader for the region. Lawrence came up with a military solution for the forty-five years of an unsettled British conquest of Acadia. The French and Indian War (and Seven Years' War in Europe) began in 1754. Lawrence's primary objectives in Acadia were to defeat the French fortifications at Beausejour and Louisbourg. The British saw many Acadians as a military threat in their allegiance to the French and Mi'kmaq. The British also wanted to interrupt the Acadian supply lines to Fortress Louisbourg, which, in turn, supplied the Mi'kmaq.

=== French and Indian War ===
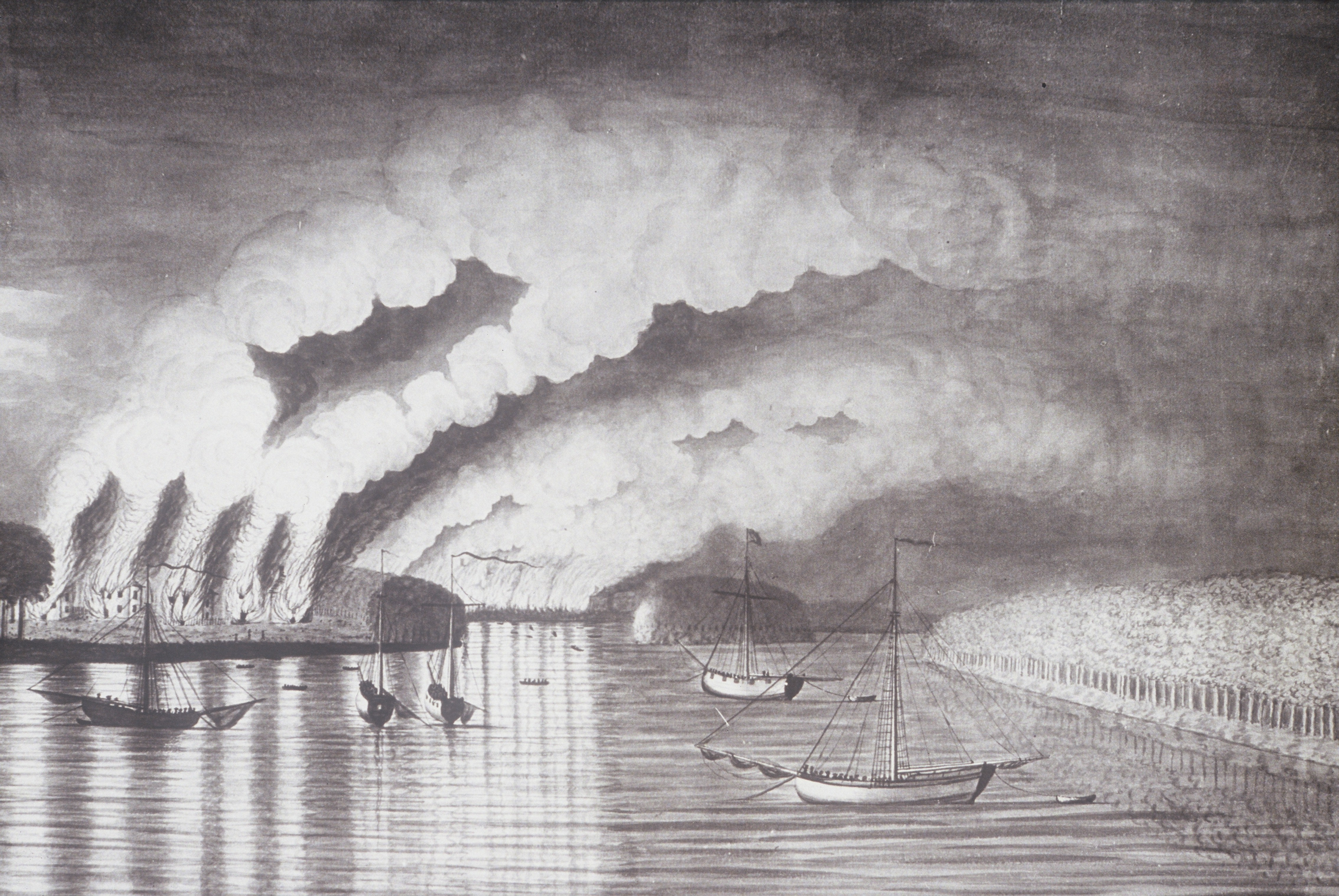
St. John River Campaign: A View of the Plundering and Burning of the City of Grimross (present day Arcadia, New Brunswick) by Thomas Davies in 1758. This is the only contemporaneous image of the Expulsion of the Acadians.

The British Conquest of Acadia happened in 1710. Over the next forty-five years the Acadians refused to sign an unconditional oath of allegiance to Britain. During this time period Acadians participated in various militia operations against the British and maintained vital supply lines to the French Fortress of Louisbourg and Fort Beausejour. During the French and Indian War, the British sought to neutralize any military threat Acadians posed and to interrupt the vital supply lines Acadians provided to Louisbourg by deporting Acadians from Acadia.

Many Acadians might have signed an unconditional oath to the British monarchy had the circumstances been better, while other Acadians did not sign because they were clearly anti-British. For the Acadians who might have signed an unconditional oath, there were numerous reasons why they did not. The difficulty was partly religious, in that the British monarch was the head of the (Protestant) Church of England. Another significant issue was that an oath might commit male Acadians to fight against France during wartime. A related concern was whether their Mi'kmaq neighbours might perceive this as acknowledging the British claim to Acadia rather than the Mi'kmaq. As a result, signing an unconditional oath might have put Acadian villages in danger of attack from Mi'kmaq.

== Wars and the Grand Dérangement (1744–1763) ==
In the Grand Dérangement (the Great Upheaval), more than 12,000 Acadians (three-fourths of the Acadian population in Nova Scotia) were expelled from the colony between 1755 and 1764. The British destroyed around 6,000 Acadian houses and dispersed the Acadians among the Thirteen Colonies from Massachusetts to Georgia. The single event that involved the most deaths of Acadians was the sinking of the Duke William. Although there were no purposeful attempts to separate families, this did occur in the chaos of the eviction.

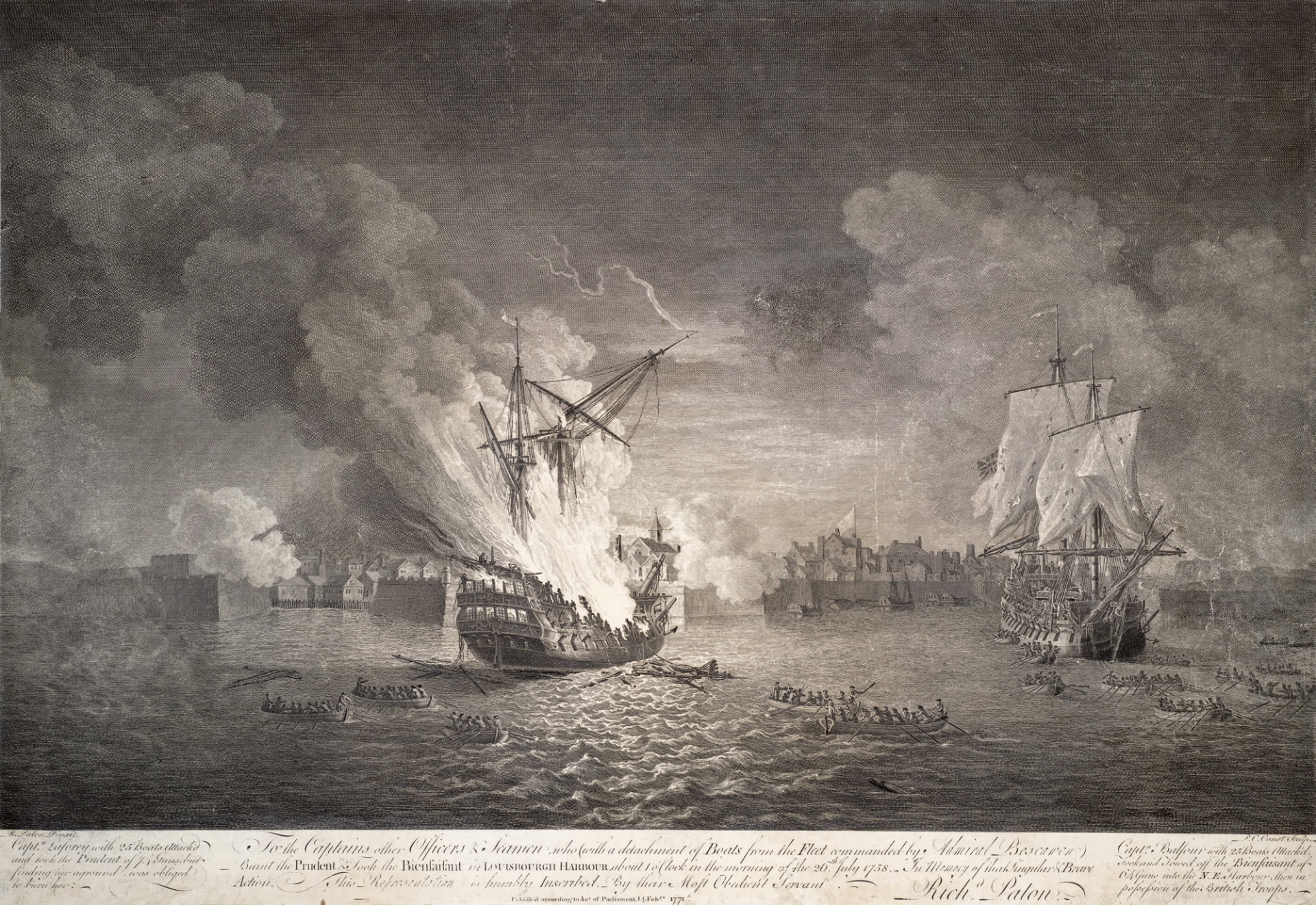
Siege of Louisbourg (1758)

==== Acadian and Mi’kmaq resistance ====
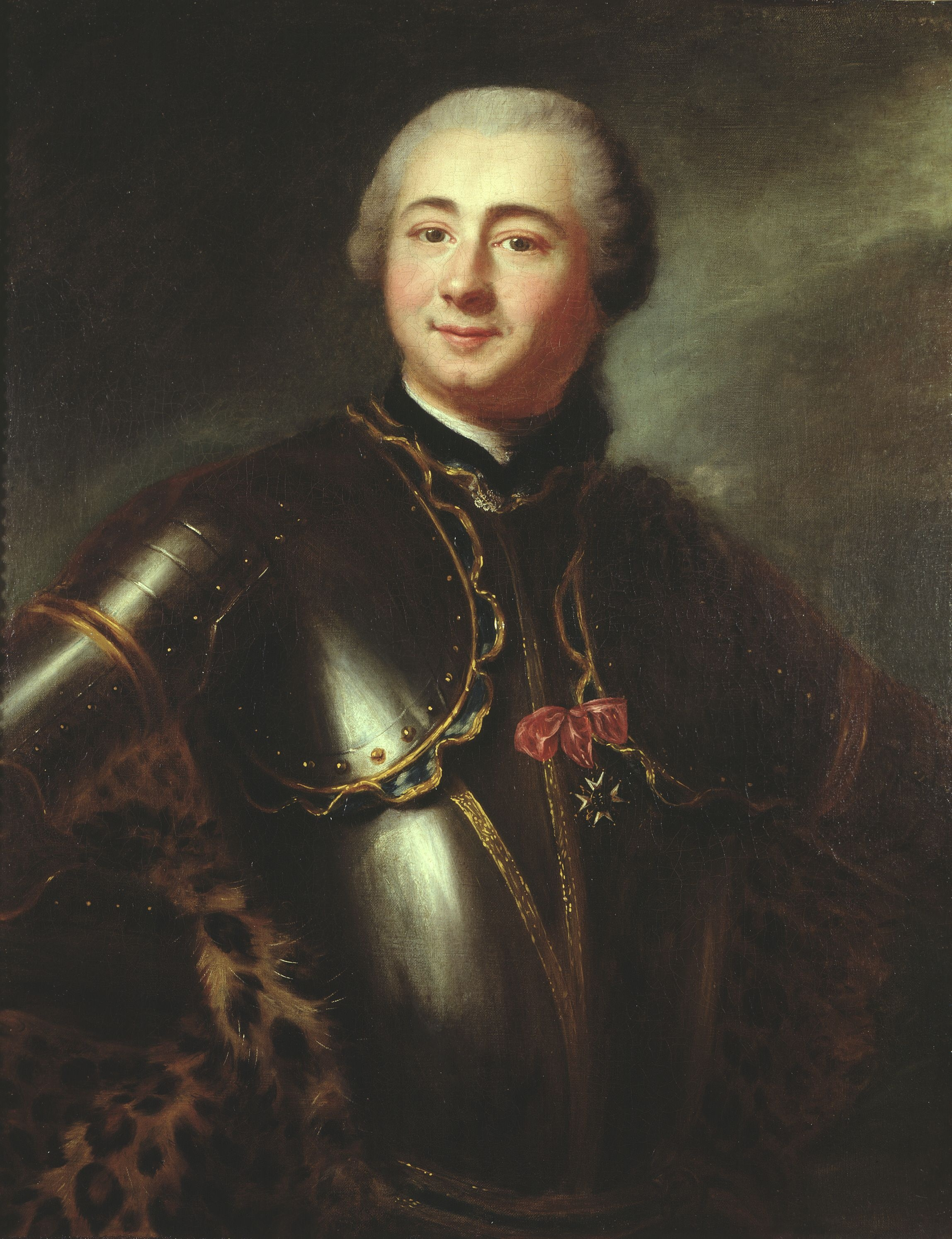
French officer, Marquis de Boishébert - Charles Deschamps de Boishébert et de Raffetot (1753)

With the Expulsion of the Acadians during the French and Indian War, the Mi’kmaq and Acadian resistance intensified. After the Expulsion began, much of the resistance was led by Charles Deschamps de Boishébert et de Raffetot. The Acadians and Mi’kmaq again engaged victoriously in the Battle of Petitcodiac (1755) and the Battle of Bloody Creek (1757). Acadians who were being deported from Annapolis Royal, Nova Scotia, on the ship Pembroke defeated the British crew and sailed to land. There was also resistance during the St. John River Campaign. Boishebert also ordered the Raid on Lunenburg (1756). In the spring of 1756, a wood-gathering party from Fort Monckton (former Fort Gaspareaux), was ambushed and nine of them were scalped.

In the April 1757, a band of Acadian and Mi'kmaq raided a warehouse near Fort Edward, killing thirteen British soldiers and, after taking what provisions they could carry, setting fire to the building. A few days later, the same partisans also raided Fort Cumberland.

Some Acadians escaped into the woods and lived with the Mi'kmaq; some bands of partisans fought the British, including a group led by Joseph Broussard, known as "Beausoleil", along the Petitcodiac River of New Brunswick. Some followed the coast northward, facing famine and disease. Some were recaptured, facing deportation or imprisonment at Fort Beausejour (renamed Fort Cumberland) until 1763.

Some Acadians became indentured servants in the British colonies. Massachusetts passed a law in November 1755 placing the Acadians under the custody of "justices of the peace and overseers of the poor"; Pennsylvania, Maryland, and Connecticut adopted similar laws. The Province of Virginia under Robert Dinwiddie initially agreed to resettle about one thousand Acadians who arrived in the colony but later ordered most deported to England, writing that the "French people" were "intestine enemies" that were "murdering and scalping our frontier Settlers".

In 1758, after the fall of Louisbourg, 3,100 Acadians were deported, of which an estimated 1,649 died by drowning or disease. Resettlement attempts were tried in Châtellerault, Nantes, and Belle Île off Brittany. The French islands of St. Pierre and Miquelon near Newfoundland became a safe harbor for many Acadian families until they were once again deported by the British in 1778 and 1793.

The history of the settlers of Ile St.-Jean prior to the expulsion includes extreme hardship. For almost every good harvest year it seems that there was one in which crops failed. In one or two instances widespread fires destroyed crops, livestock and farms. Famine and starvation were common and frequently occasioned desperate pleas for supplies from Louisbourg, Québec and even France itself. In 1756, famine on Ile St.-Jean prompted authorities to relocate some families to Québec.

== Return and reconstruction (1764–1880) ==
After the end of the Seven Years' War in 1763, Acadians were allowed to return to Nova Scotia as long as they did not settle in any one area in large numbers; they were not permitted to resettle in the areas of Port Royal or Grand-Pré. Some Acadians resettled along the Nova Scotia coast and remain scattered across Nova Scotia to this day. Many dispersed Acadians looked for other homes. Beginning in 1764, groups of Acadians began to arrive in Louisiana (which had passed to Spanish control in 1762). They eventually became known as Cajuns.

Beginning in the 1770s, many Acadians were encouraged to return through the policies of Nova Scotia Governor Michael Francklin, who guaranteed Catholic worship, land grants and issued a promise that there would be no second expulsion (At this time, Nova Scotia included present-day New Brunswick). However the fertile Acadian dykelands had been resettled by New England Planters, who were soon followed by Loyalists who further occupied former Acadian lands. Returning Acadians and those families who had escaped expulsion had to settle in other parts of Nova Scotia and New Brunswick, in most cases isolated and infertile lands. The new Acadian settlements were forced to focus more on fishery and later forestry.

Milestones of Acadian return and resettlement included:

- 1767 St. Pierre et Miquelon
- 1772 census
- 1774 Founding of Saint-Anne's church; the Acadian school at Rustico and the abbey Jean-Louis Beaubien; the Trappistines in Tracadie
- 1785 Displacement from Fort Sainte-Anne to the upper Saint John River valley (Madawaska)

Milestones of Acadian return and resettlement included:

- Jean-Mandé Sigogne (6 April 1763 – 9 November 1844) was a French Catholic priest, who moved to Canada after the Revolution and became known for his missionary work among the Acadians of Nova Scotia.
- 1836 Simon d'Entremont and Frédéric Robichaud, MLAs in N.S.
- 1846 Amand Landry, MLA in N.B.
- 1847, Longfellow publishes Evangeline
- 1854, Stanislaw-Francois Poirier, MLA in P.E.I
- 1854, the seminary Saint-Thomas in Memramcook, New Brunswick, becomes the first upper-level school for Acadians
- 1859, the first history of Acadia, "La France aux colonies" is published in French by Edme Rameau de Saint-Père; Acadians begin to become aware of their own existence

== Renaissance (1881–1950) ==
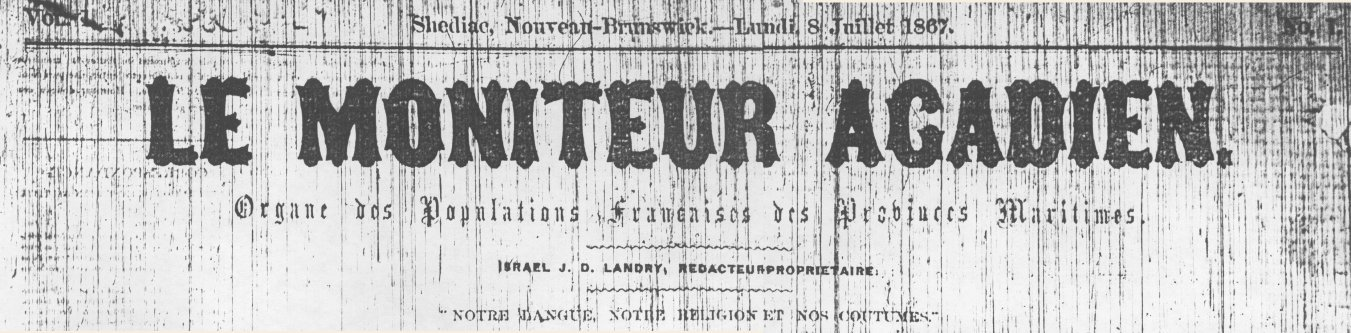
Le Moniteur Acadien - first Acadian newspaper (1867)

- 1864 founding of the Farmers' Bank of Rustico, the earliest known community bank in Canada, under the leadership of Rev. Georges-Antoine Belcourt
- 1867, first Acadian newspaper, Le Moniteur Acadien (The Acadian Monitor) is published by Israël Landry
- 1871, Common Schools Act of 1871 prohibiting the teaching of religion in the classroom
- 1875, the death of Louis Mailloux, 19 years old, in Caraquet by government forces only stokes Acadian nationalism
- 1880, the Society of Saint John the Baptiste invites Francophones from all over North America to a congress in Quebec City
- July 20–21, 1881, Acadian leaders organize the first Acadian National Convention in Memramcook, New Brunswick, which had for its goal to take care of the general interests of the Acadian population. More than 5,000 Acadians participated in the convention. It was decided that August 15, the Feast of the Assumption of the Virgin Mary, would be chosen to celebrate Acadian culture as National Acadian Day. Other debates at the convention centered around education, agriculture, emigration, colonization, and newspapers, and these same issues would arise at subsequent conventions.
- At the second convention, on August 15, 1884, in Miscouche, Prince Edward Island, the Acadian flag, an anthem - Ave Maris Stella, and a motto - L'union fait la force were adopted.
- 1885, John A. Macdonald nominates Pascal Poirier from Shediac as the first Acadian senator; a second Acadian newspaper published, Le Courrier des Provinces Maritimes
- 1887, the newspaper L'Evangéline begins being published from Digby, later, in 1905, moves to Moncton
- 1890, third Acadian convention
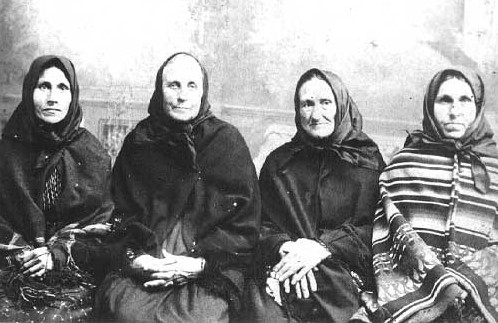
A picture of four Acadian women, 1895
- 1912, Monsigneur Edouard LeBlanc is the first Acadian bishop in The Maritimes
- 1917, the Conservative Aubin-Edmond Arsenault becomes the first Acadian premier of P.E.I.
- 1920, 2nd Acadian bishop, Mgr Alexandre Chiasson in Chatham and later Bathurst; la Société nationale de l'Assomption undertakes a campaign to build a commemorative church in Grand-Pré, Nova Scotia
- 1923, Pierre-Jean Véniot becomes the first Acadian premier of N.B. but was not elected
- 1936, the first Caisse Populaire Acadien in Petit-Rocher is founded; the committee France-Acadie is founded

== Modern Acadians (1950s–present) ==
- 1955, the first Tintamarre occurs.
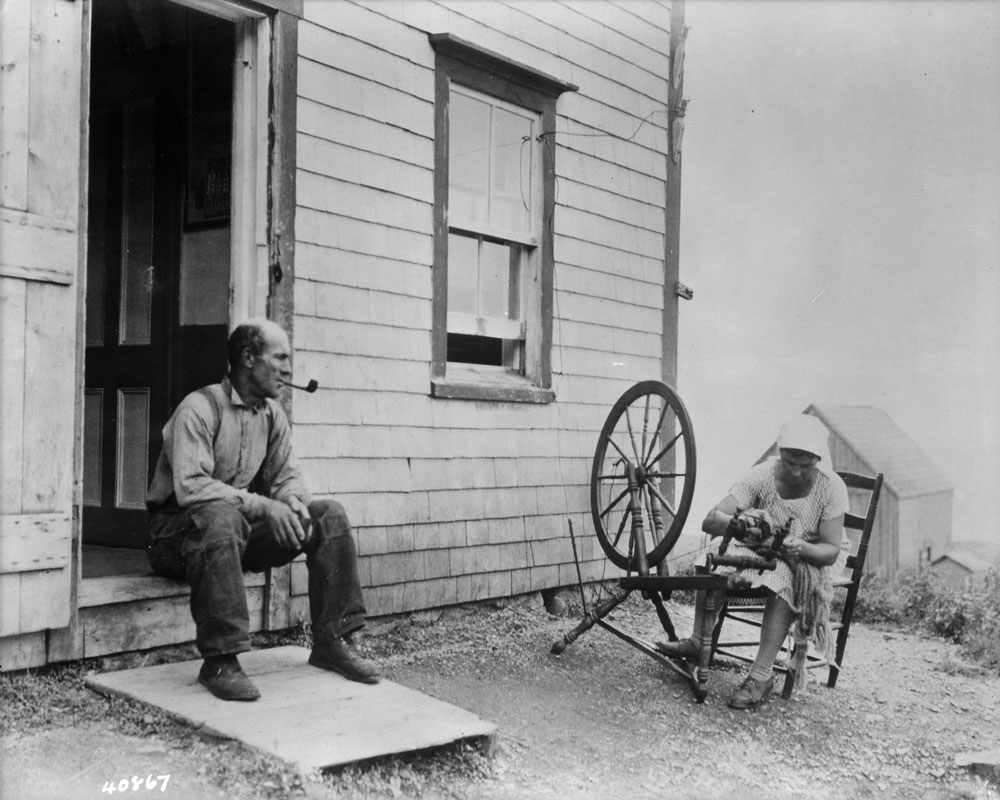
An Acadian home along Cabot Trail, Cape Breton Island, Nova Scotia, 1938

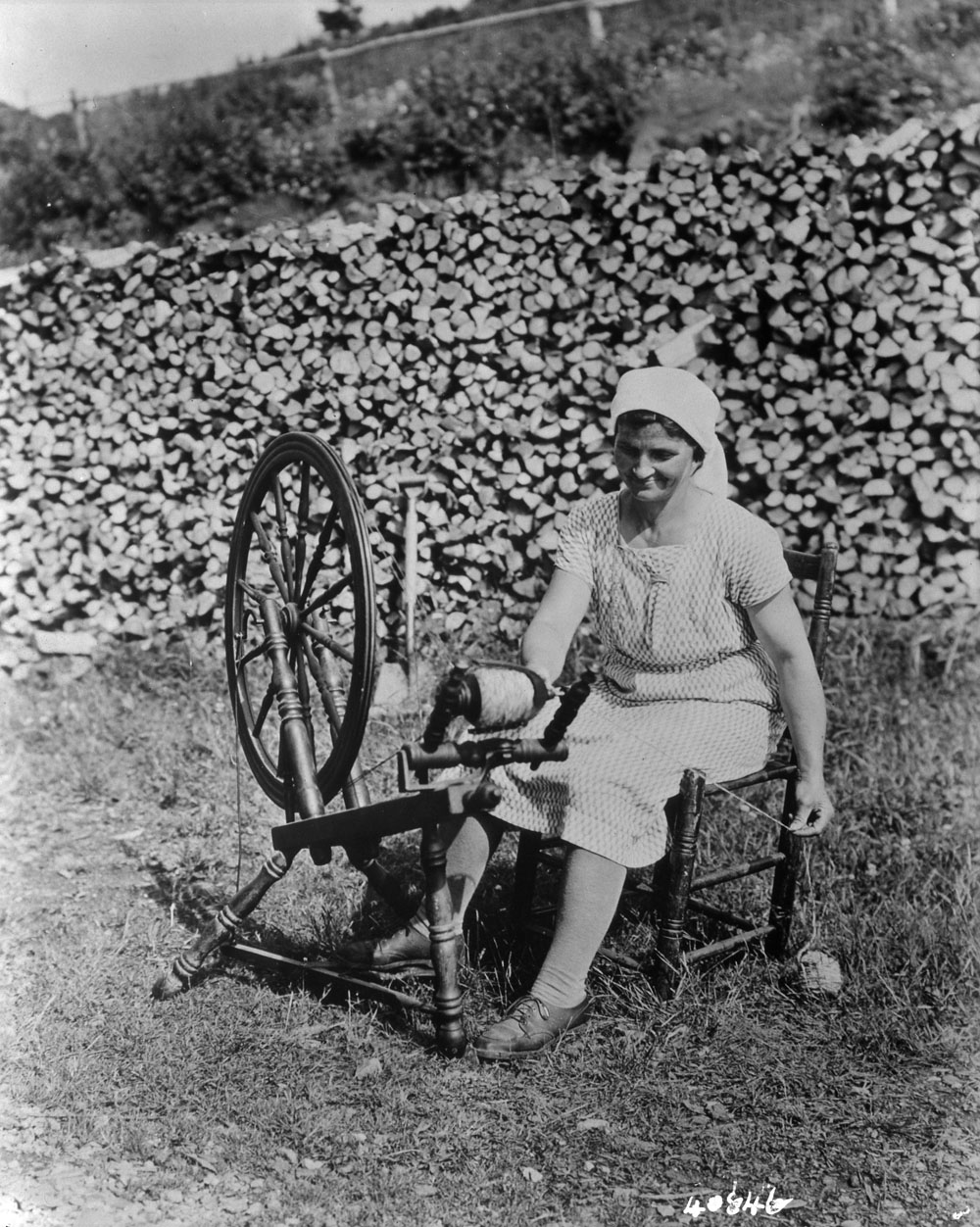
An Acadian lady spinning wool, 1938

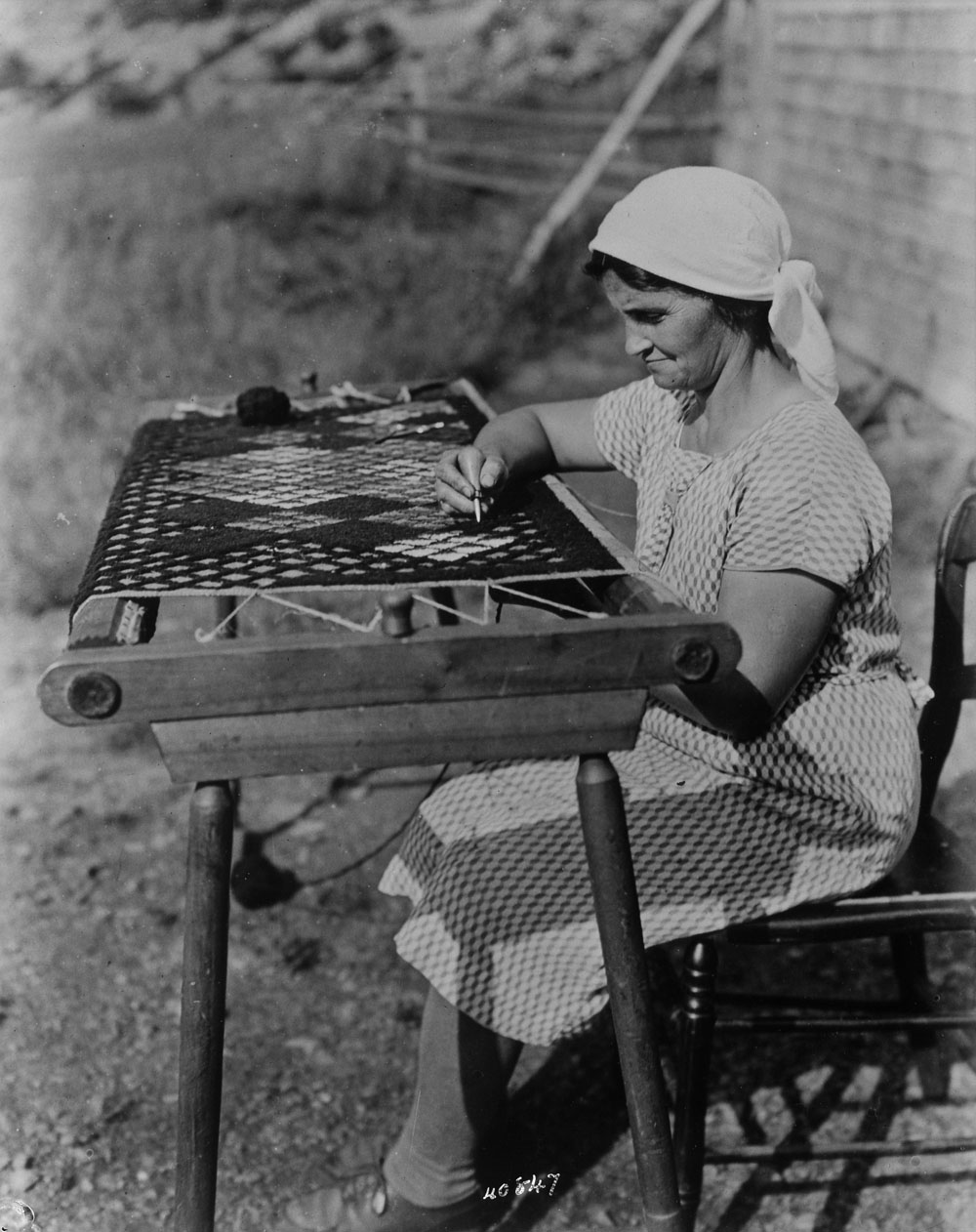
An Acadian lady making a rug, 1938

=== The Equal Opportunity program ===
Louis Robichaud, popularly known as "P'tit-Louis" (Little Louis), was the first elected Acadian Premier of New Brunswick, serving from 1960 to 1970. First elected to the legislature in 1952, he became provincial Liberal leader in 1958 and led his party to victory in 1960, 1963, and 1967.

Robichaud modernized the province's hospitals and public schools and introduced a wide range of reforms in an era that became known as the New Brunswick Equal Opportunity program, at the same time as the Quiet Revolution in Québec. To carry out these reforms, Robichaud restructured the municipal tax regime, expanded the government and sought to ensure that the quality of health care, education and social services was the same across the province—a programme he called equal opportunity, is still a buzzword in New Brunswick.

Critics accused of Robichaud's government of "robbing Peter to pay Pierre" with the assumption being that rich municipalities were Anglophone ones and poor municipalities were Francophone ones. While it was true that the wealthier municipalities were predominantly in certain English-speaking areas, areas with significantly inferior services were to be found across the province in all municipalities.

Robichaud was instrumental in the formation of New Brunswick's only French-speaking university, the Université de Moncton, in 1963, which serves the Acadian population of the Maritime provinces.

His government also passed the New Brunswick Official Languages Act (1969) making the province officially bilingual. "Language rights", he said when he introduced the legislation, "are more than legal rights. They are precious cultural rights, going deep into the revered past and touching the historic traditions of all our people."

1977, official opening of the Acadian Historic Village in Caraquet, New Brunswick.

=== Antonine Maillet ===
Born 1929 in Bouctouche, Antonine Maillet is an Acadian novelist, playwright, and scholar. Maillet received a BA and MA from the Université de Moncton, followed by a Ph.D. in literature in 1970 from the Université Laval. Maillet won the 1972 Governor General's Award for Fiction for Don l'Orignal. In 1979, Maillet published Pélagie-la-Charrette, for which she won the prix Goncourt. Maillet's character "La Sagouine" (from her book of the same name) is the inspiration for "Le Pays de la Sagouine" in her hometown of Bouctouche.

In 2003, at the request of Acadian representatives, a proclamation was issued in the name of Queen Elizabeth II, as the Canadian monarch, officially acknowledging the deportation and establishing July 28 as a day of commemoration. The day of commemoration is observed by the Government of Canada, as the successor of the British Government.

=== Acadian Remembrance Day ===
The Fédération des Associations de Familles Acadiennes of New Brunswick and the Société Saint-Thomas d'Aquin of Prince Edward Island has resolved that December 13 each year shall be commemorated as "Acadian Remembrance Day" in remembrance of all Acadians who died as a result of the deportation. The date December 13 was chosen to commemorate the sinking of the Duke William and the nearly 2000 Acadians deported from Île-Saint Jean who perished in the North Atlantic from hunger, disease and drowning in 1758. The event has been commemorated annually since 2004 and participants mark the event by wearing a black star.

=== Acadian World Congress ===
Beginning in 1994, the Acadian community gathered for an Acadian World Congress in New Brunswick. The congress has been held every 5 years since then: in Louisiana in 1999, in Nova Scotia in 2004, in the Acadian Peninsula of New Brunswick in 2009. The 5th Acadian World Congress was hosted in 2014 by a gathering of 40 different communities located in three different provinces and different states in two countries. Northwestern New Brunswick and Témiscouata, Quebec, in Canada as well as Northern Maine in the United States joined hands to host the 5th CMA.

== See also ==
- Military history of the Acadians
- Military history of Nova Scotia
- Acadians
- Cajun
- Occitania
- Fort Beauséjour and Fortress of Louisbourg
- Henri Peyroux de la Coudreniere
- List of governors of Acadia
- Military history of Canada
- Southern France
- Aquitaine
- Midi-Pyrénées
- New Brunswick
- Nova Scotia
- Prince Edward Island
- List of years in Canada
- History of Nova Scotia
- Acadian Renaissance
- Acadian folklore
- Acadian art
- Acadian culture
- Acadian cuisine
- Acadian diaspora
- Religion in Acadia
- Acadian cinema
- Société Nationale de l'Acadie
- Sainte-Anne du Ruisseaux Church
