= Elizabeth Lefort =

Canadian artist (1914–2005)

Elizabeth Lefort CM
- Born: 1914; Point Cross, Canada
- Died: 2005 (aged 90–91); Chéticamp, Canada
- Known for: Tapestry
- Spouse: Kenneth Hansford
- Awards: Order of Canada (1987)

Elizabeth Lefort CM (1914–2005) was a Canadian tapestry artist of Acadian descent, known for replicating photographs including portraits.

== Biography ==
Elizabeth Lefort was born in 1914 in Point Cross, Nova Scotia. In 1926, at the age of 12 she left school to begin her career and bring in needed income for her family. Lefort learned the craft of rug hooking from her mother. This craft has strong roots in Cape Breton.

Lefort showed particular proficiency and around 1940 began following her own vision of design, by meticulously copying a postcard she received from her brother in England. Not only was the rug an artistic success, it sold for a higher price than the more traditional designs. To achieve the desired effect, Lefort dyed the wool she used to the specific colors she wanted.

Lefort continued her work, championed by owner of a local crafts store, Kenneth Hansford, and she became the artist-in-residence at the Paul Pix Boutique in Margaree Harbour, Nova Scotia. Lefort and Hansford eventually married.

In 1957, Lefort completed a tapestry portrait of U.S. President Eisenhower which was presented to the White House.

Lefort continued producing portraits and also often used religious subjects, including a tapestry reproduction of da Vinci's Last Supper.

In 1975, she received an honorary Docteur ès lettres from the Université de Moncton. In 1987, she was appointed a member of the Order of Canada.

Lafort died in 2005 in Chéticamp, Nova Scotia.
