= Alain Douville =

French footballer (1950–2025)

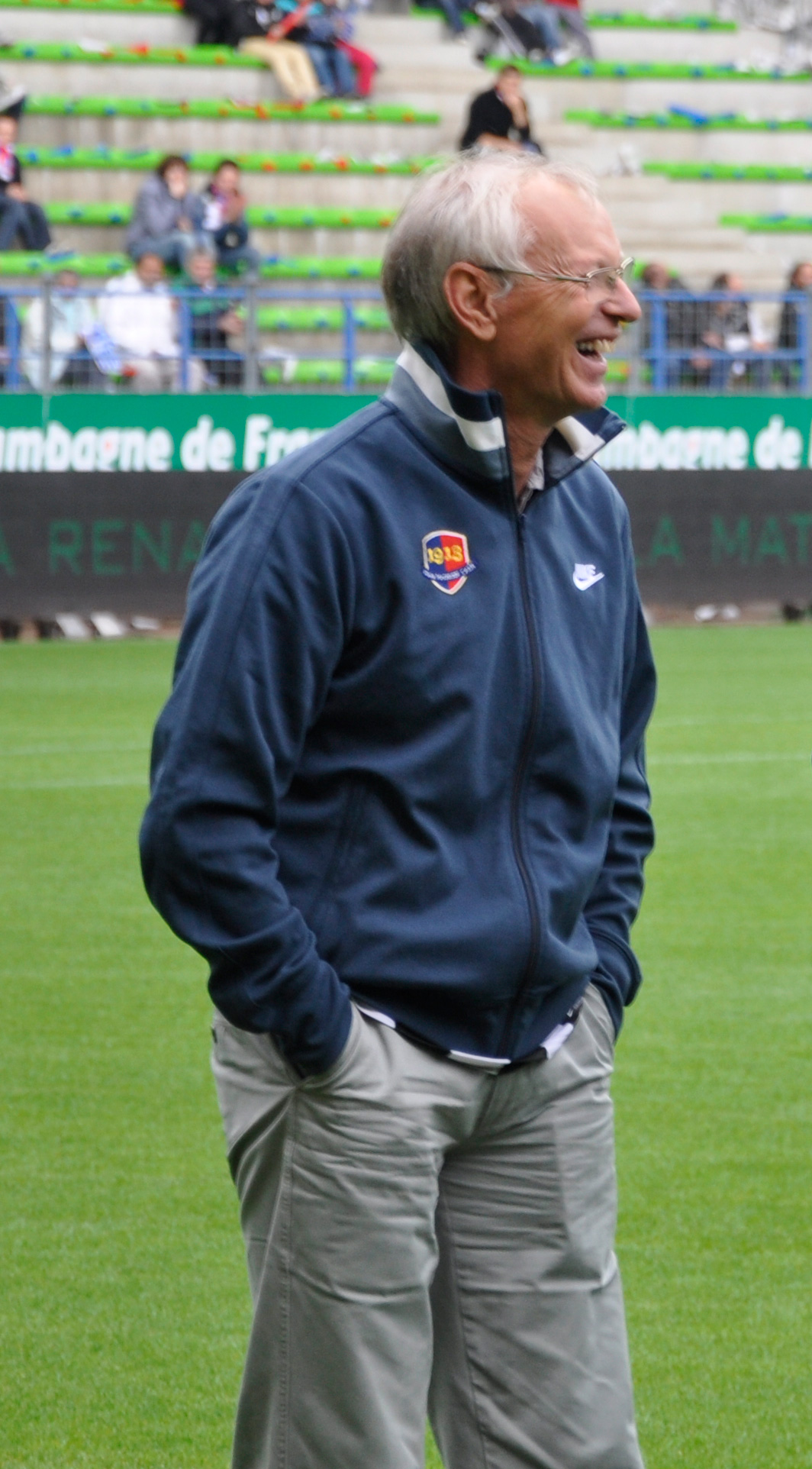
- Douville in 2013

Personal information
- Date of birth: 20 May 1950
- Place of birth: Coutainville, France
- Date of death: 3 July 2025 (aged 75)
- Place of death: Caen, France
- Height: 1.80 m (5 ft 11 in)
- Position: Goalkeeper

Senior career*
Years	Team	Apps	(Gls)
1972–1973	Saint-Lô		
1973–1985	Caen	308	(0)
Total		308	(0)

International career
1977	France Amateurs	1	(0)
- * Club domestic league appearances and goals

Alain Douville (French: [alɛ̃ duvil]; 20 May 1950 – 3 July 2025) was a French footballer who played as a goalkeeper.

== Biography ==
Born in Coutainville on 20 May 1950, Douville had a short career in athletics with his ability to sprint 100 meters in 10.6 seconds. He also played for Saint-Lô from 1972 to 1973. In 1973, he moved to Caen to pursue his studies in physical education, simultaneously signing with SM Caen, becoming the club's starting goalkeeper. He ended up playing 308 total matches with the club both in Division 3 and Division 2. At the height of his career, he was selected for the France Amateurs for a match against the Netherlands on 13 April 1977, which ended in a 4–0 defeat for the French. He notably played this match with his teammate, Jean-Paul Bouffandeau. He missed the entire 1978–79 season with a knee injury and temporarily played as a winger for the C team in the 1981–82 season. In 1985, he retired after contracting viral hepatitis. He later became goalkeeping coach for Caen and his jubilee was organized on 5 March 1988 in a match against Rouen. He held the role of goalkeeping coach until 2001 and continued to teach physical education in Hérouville-Saint-Clair until his retirement in 2014.

Douville died in Caen on 3 July 2025, at the age of 75.
