= Farmers' Bank of Rustico =

First credit union in Canada

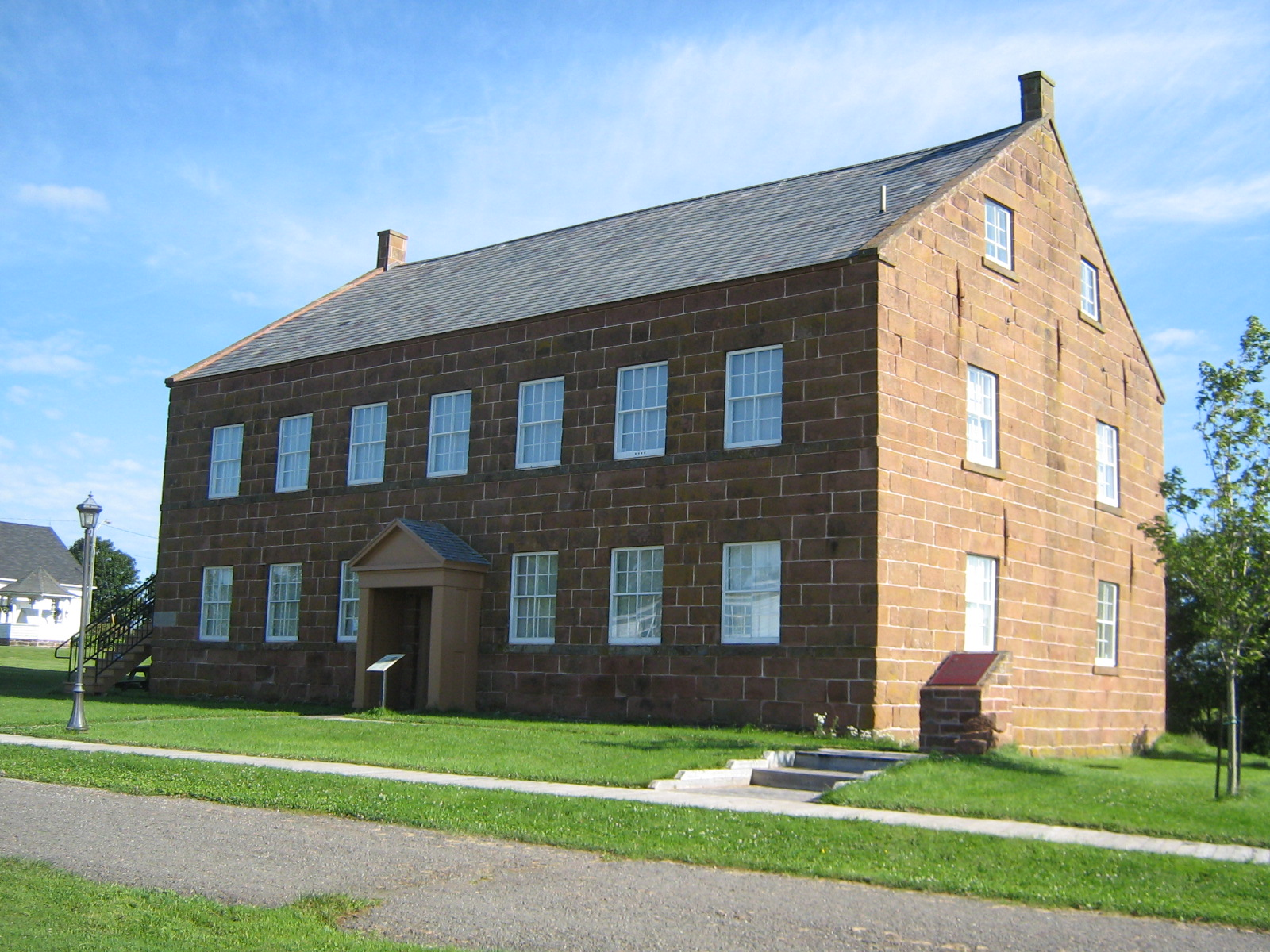
- Farmers' Bank of Rustico
- Industry: Banking
- Founded: April 21, 1863; 163 years ago
- Founder: Georges-Antoine Belcourt
- Defunct: 1894
- Fate: Charter not renewed
- Headquarters: Rustico (now Lot 24), Prince Edward Island, Canada
- Website: farmersbank.ca/en/farmers-bank (museum website)

The Farmers' Bank of Rustico operated in the village of Rustico, Prince Edward Island, from 1864 to 1894. It is often considered to have been the first community-based bank in Canada. Founded and managed under the leadership of Father Georges-Antoine Belcourt (1803-1874), the Farmer's Bank of Rustico was established on April 21, 1863. The bank received Royal Assent for its act of incorporation at the Court of Windsor on April 7, 1864." The first president was farmer Jerome Doiron, and the first cashier was Marinus Blanchard, a local school teacher.

The Farmers' Bank "was the precursor of the North American credit union movement through its influence upon the pioneer credit union organizer, Alphonse Desjardins of Quebec." Like the later credit unions, the Farmers' Bank accepted deposits and provided loans, primarily for less than 1 year. It showed that villagers could successfully operate a financial institution without the assistance of banking experts. However, there are also important differences. The Bank issued its own currency and kept its working funds in specie. But it never built up a substantial reserve fund—preferring to return most of its annual profits to shareholders as dividends.

The Farmers' Bank was also one of the earliest manifestations of a strong movement of Acadian economic self-determination. Belcourt's innovative ideas also gave rise to dozens of seed grain banks in Acadian communities in the 1860s, including one in Egmont Bay that was a precursor to the later co-operative movement in the Evangeline region of the Island. The Bank also anticipated Mouvement des caisses populaires acadiennes, a 200,000 member network of credit unions in New Brunswick.

As such, it played an important role in the development of the Acadian community in the Maritimes. In the view of MacDonald, "the steady availability of cheap credit for thirty years enabled the predominantly Acadian community to attain economic independence." However, the Canadian Bank Act of 1871 did not envision such small financial institutions, and the Farmers' Bank wound up its operations when its charter was not renewed in 1894.

== Farmers' Bank of Rustico Museum ==
The Farmers' Bank of Rustico in Rustico, Prince Edward Island built in 1861 to 1863 is a National Historic Site of Canada, and serves as a local history museum. Displays include Father Georges-Antoine Belcourt and the bank's history, Acadian culture, the fishing industry and area natural history. Admission to the museum includes a tour of the adjacent Doucet House, which was moved to the site in 1999 from its original location on Grand-Père Point. The home has been restored to its pioneer appearance.
