= Georges-Antoine Belcourt =

French Canadian priest and missionary

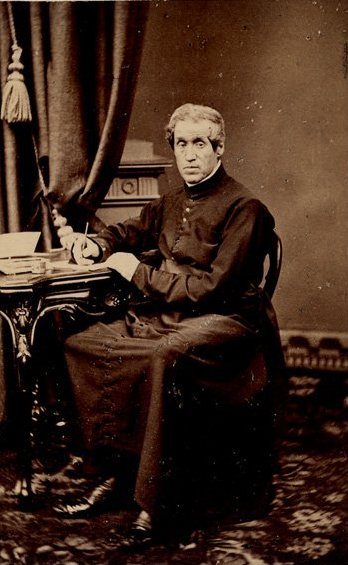
- Belcourt c. 1860, approx. age 57
- Born: April 22, 1803; Baie-du-Febvre, Quebec
- Died: May 31, 1874 (aged 71); Shediac, New Brunswick
- Other name: George Antoine Bellecourt
- Occupations: Priest and missionary
- Known for: Bringing the first car to British North America

Georges-Antoine Belcourt (April 22, 1803 – May 31, 1874), also George Antoine Bellecourt, was a French Canadian Roman Catholic diocesan priest and missionary. Born in Baie-du-Febvre, Quebec, Belcourt was ordained in 1827. He established missions in areas of Quebec and Manitoba. On the frontier, he became involved in a political dispute between the local First Nations population and the Hudson's Bay Company, the monopoly fur trading company.

At the urging of the Company's Governor, Belcourt was recalled to Montreal. He was next assigned to Pembina, North Dakota. He established two missions in the 1840s to convert the local Ojibwe (also called Chippewa) and Métis to Catholicism. In 1859, Belcourt left Pembina for Quebec, but was quickly redeployed to North Rustico, Prince Edward Island. He established the Farmers' Bank of Rustico (the first community-based bank in Canada).

Belcourt retired from his post in 1869 to live out his life in New Brunswick, but was recalled in 1871, this time to the Magdalen Islands. In May 1874, Belcourt was forced to retire due to ill health. He died in Shediac, New Brunswick, on May 31, 1874. He was designated a National Historic Person by the Government of Canada in 1959.

== Early life ==
Georges-Antoine Belcourt was born on April 22, 1803, at Baie-du-Febvre, Quebec, to Antoine Belcourt and Josephte Lemire, who had married on February 23, 1802. His parents, devout Roman Catholics, brought their son up in the same faith, and the young Belcourt received his first Holy Communion in 1814. At age 13, Belcourt enrolled in Le Petit Séminaire de Québec to undertake a philosophical course of study, which he completed in 1823. Belcourt studied to become a priest, and on March 10, 1827, Bernard-Claude Panet, the Archbishop of Quebec, performed Belcourt's ordination in the chapel at the Seminary.

Belcourt was appointed as an assistant at several parishes in the area, before becoming pastor of a parish at Sainte-Martine, Quebec, in 1830. As he was bilingual and spoke English as well as French, he was able to minister to his parish of mostly Irish Catholic Canadians.

== Early missionary work ==
During his time at Sainte-Martine, the young priest aspired to do missionary work in the west of British North America and applied for it. In 1830, Archbishop Panet requested that the young priest accompany him on a journey to Manitoba. Following an interview in February 1831, Belcourt was enlisted to go on the trip. After spending two months learning the Algonquian language, Belcourt departed from his home town on April 27 of that year in a canoe of the Hudson's Bay Company. On June 17, the priest's party arrived at Saint Boniface, Manitoba, and Belcourt was assigned as one of three priests there. He was to assist the Bishop at the town's cathedral, and study the Anishinaabe language. He was to work with the Ojibwe people to convert them to Christianity. Although the language was not yet documented in written form, Belcourt made rapid progress. Within a year, he had learned enough to be considered ready to work directly with those whom he termed the "savages," as was customary at the time.

In 1832, Belcourt established the first native-only mission west of Saint Boniface, but Gros Ventre raids forced its closure the following year. In 1834, he established a mission at Baie-Saint-Paul on the Assiniboine River, where he instructed the local Aboriginal population in European-style agriculture. The priest had a log chapel built, with smaller log cabins on the surrounding land to house the natives. The local bishop opposed his missionary work, as he believed the Aboriginal Canadians would not settle in one spot for long. Belcourt overcame this opposition, and in 1834 built a school at his mission, enlisting the assistance of a Chippewa-speaking woman to serve as a teacher. In 1836, the missionary admitted five natives to Holy Communion. He was discouraged by the Ojibwe readiness to return to their former spiritual practices after baptism.

In 1838, Belcourt travelled to Rainy Lake to examine sites for a mission. He abandoned the plan after discovering that the First Nations people were unwilling to give up their Hudson's Bay Company-supplied liquor, as he required for conversion to Christianity. In August 1838, the priest arranged to have a dictionary published in the Chippewa language, and returned to his mission at Baie-Saint-Paul. In the winter of 1839, Belcourt carved 280 oak balusters and candlesticks for his log chapel.

In 1840, the missionary established a mission among the Wabaseemoong Independent Nations, where he repeated his Baie-Saint-Paul design: a log chapel at the centre surrounded by small cabins for the local population, with outlying farms. The mission closed ten years later; Belcourt blamed this on mismanagement by oblates he had entrusted with its management. In 1845, Belcourt served as the chaplain to some buffalo hunters, but returned to his first mission at Baie-Saint-Paul to teach the Chippewa language to a group of oblates.

In 1846, a dysentery epidemic swept communities along the Assiniboine River in Manitoba. On June 22 of that year, Belcourt left his mission at Baie-Saint-Paul to join a group of hunters on their journey south for the summer. The hunters carried the disease, infecting others, and 25 people died of dysentery by July 5. On the worst days, eight people had to be buried. Belcourt and six of the hunters travelled south to the Fort Berthold Indian Reservation in search of medicine, as the priest's supply had quickly run out. With his medicine supplies replenished, the missionary headed back to the encampment of hunters before returning to his mission.

== Arrival in North Dakota ==
In 1847, in response to perceived discrimination against First Nations people by the Hudson's Bay Company in the fur trade, Belcourt prepared a petition to Queen Victoria to seek redress. The petition was signed by 977 First Nations people, but the Colonial Secretary, Earl Grey, consulted with advisors who had little sympathy for the natives and took no action in the case. The Company criticised Belcourt for what it saw as his inciting discontent among the local First Nations. The Company administrators decided that the priest should not be allowed to remain in British North America. The missionary was arrested, but was released after the charges against him were discovered to be unfounded. At the urging of the Company's Governor, the Archbishop of Quebec asked Belcourt to return to Montreal. Belcourt asked the Governor of the Company to retract the charges for which he was arrested. The Governor apologised for what he described as a mistake on the part of the Company's chief Factors.

The Church assigned Belcourt to Pembina, North Dakota, as a missionary to the Chippewa and Métis of the Pembina River basin, a tributary to the Red River of the North. Upon arrival at Pembina, Belcourt constructed a small log cabin of 20 feet long by 30 feet wide, which was not large enough for all of his congregation. On August 14, 1848, the missionary baptised his first person in Pembina, and held a Holy Communion class consisting of 92 Native Americans. Needing more resources, Belcourt wrote to the Archbishop of Quebec for money for food and building supplies. He also asked for another Canadian priest well-versed in both French and the Chippewa language, as he noted there were more Métis than Chippewa in the Pembina area. Belcourt described the original territory of the Chippewa in the Pembina district as several hundred miles north to south, and east to west - much larger than the small reservation to which they were later assigned.

In addition to performing his missionary work, Belcourt engaged in political advocacy on the behalf of Métis and Anishinaabeg peoples. In 1849, Belcourt gathered a petition of one hundred names of Métis heads of families protesting ongoing encroachment on the buffalo robe and pemmican trade by the Hudson's Bay Company. Belcourt forwarded the petition and letter of protest to the governor of Minnesota Territory, Alexander Ramsey. In November 1849, the young and recently ordained priest Albert Lacombe arrived in Pembina and immediately started to learn the Chippewa language. Despite claiming to have to resort to manual labour to pay for his food, Belcourt supported a household that included a school teacher, a housekeeper, a Chippewa cook and several servants. Thirty miles to the west, he established a mission at Turtle Mountain to serve as a base for expansion toward the Canadian Rockies.

In 1853, Belcourt moved to what is now Walhalla, North Dakota, and established a school and a church there. The priest envisioned a large metropolis for the area. He began to lay out a city planned in the European-style of a grid, with wide streets and several open squares. Despite his having planned for ample water, and the natural advantages of fertile soil and resources in the area, major development went elsewhere. Since the early twentieth century, agriculture has declined as a mainstay of family economies in the area. The town has 885 residents.

A strong advocate of prohibition of alcohol, especially among Native Americans and First Nations peoples, Belcourt petitioned the US Congress to prevent the illicit trafficking of liquor from Canada into the United States. In March 1859, Belcourt left North Dakota to return to Canada.

== Return to Canada ==
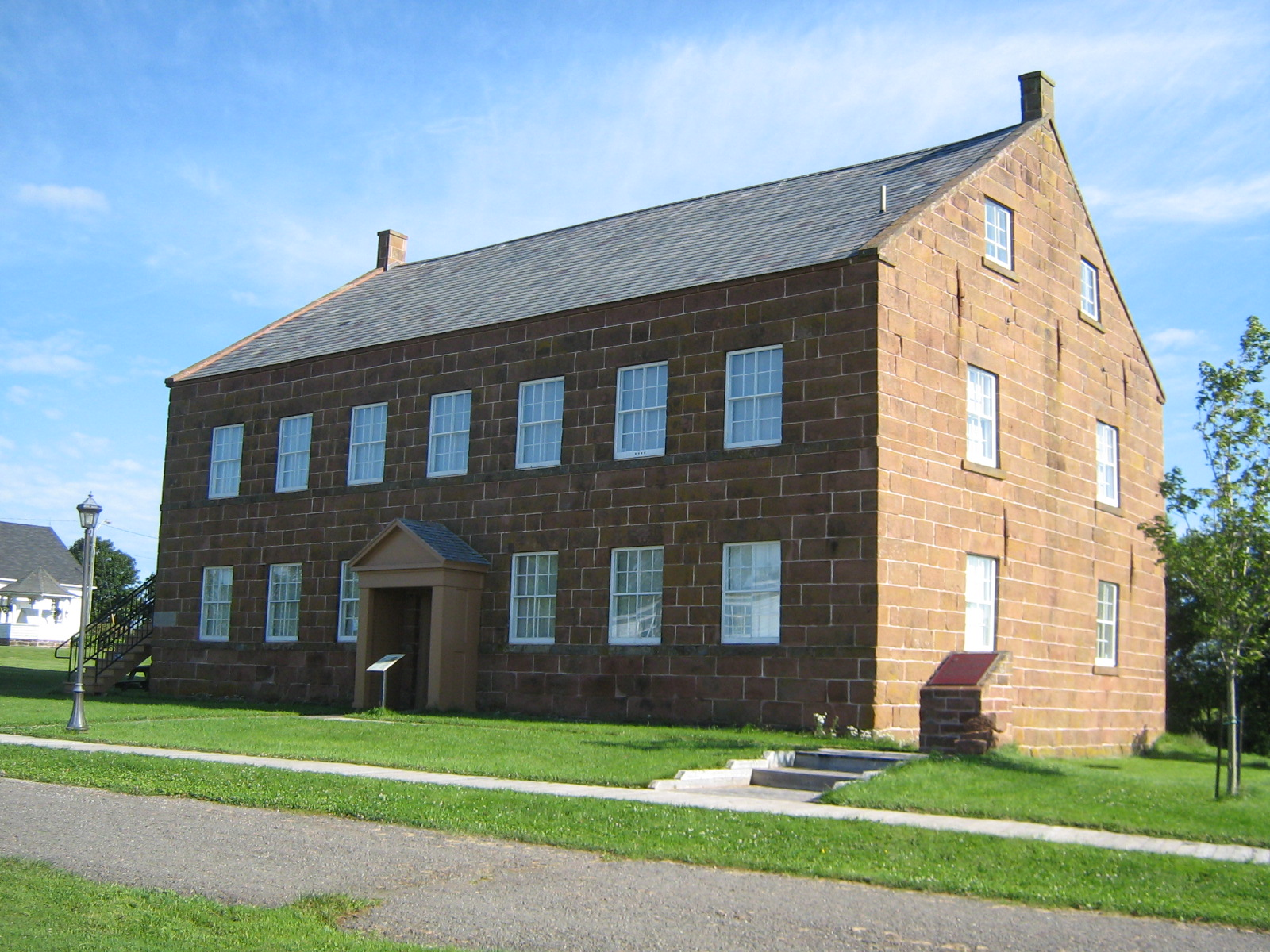
Farmers' Bank of Rustico

Belcourt returned to Quebec, but was quickly sent out to serve at a parish at Rustico, Prince Edward Island. Arriving there in November 1859, the priest performed his first baptism among the local people the following month. Belcourt built a parish hall out of stone (which was used into the 1950s) and established the Farmers' Bank of Rustico. He founded a high school, where he taught until recruiting a teacher from Montreal to the island. The priest created a study group, the members of which had to agree to be teetotalers. He established a parish library, built with the assistance of 1,000 French francs a year from Emperor Napoleon III, nephew of Napoleon I. In October 1865, Belcourt resigned from his position at the parish at Rustico, and returned to Quebec for some weeks.

He asked for reassignment to Rustico and returned to the island in November. In 1866, Belcourt built and demonstrated a steam-powered vehicle, considered the first automobile to be driven in Canada.

Belcourt remained pastor of his parish at Rustico until 1869, when he retired. The priest intended to live on a farm at Shediac, New Brunswick, but was called back to the church in August 1871. He was asked to pastor a parish on the Magdalen Islands. Ill health forced his retirement from there in May 1874, and he returned to Shediac before dying on May 31, 1874.

== Legacy and honors ==
- The town of Belcourt, North Dakota, was named after the late priest in honour of his efforts in the region.
- In 1959, Belcourt was designated a National Historic Person by the Government of Canada.
