= Yvon Gallant =

Acadian painter (born 1950)

- Born: 1950 (age 75–76)
- Known for: Painting

Yvon Gallant is an Acadian painter, from Moncton, born in 1950.

He is best known for his faceless portraits and urban landscapes.

In 1994, a retrospective exhibition of the painter entitled Yvon Gallant: Based on a True Story was organised by curator Terry Graff and by the Confederation Centre Art Gallery and Museum, in Charlottetown.

In the summer of 2018, as part of the Rendez-vous Acadie Love in Caraquet, the Portraits of Yvon Gallant exhibition presented nearly 50 influential personalities from Acadia.

Yvon Gallant was elected a member of the Royal Canadian Academy of Arts in 2005.
