= Point Cross =

Community in Nova Scotia, Canada

Coordinates: 46°35′8.33″N 61°1′23.58″W

Point Cross in Nova Scotia

Point Cross is a small community in the Canadian province of Nova Scotia, located in Inverness County on Cape Breton Island. The area was named Point Cross, or Pointe a la Croix, after the first settlers erected a cross there.

In 1956, Point Cross had a population of 251 people.
