= Pierre Douville =

French naval officer (1745–1794)

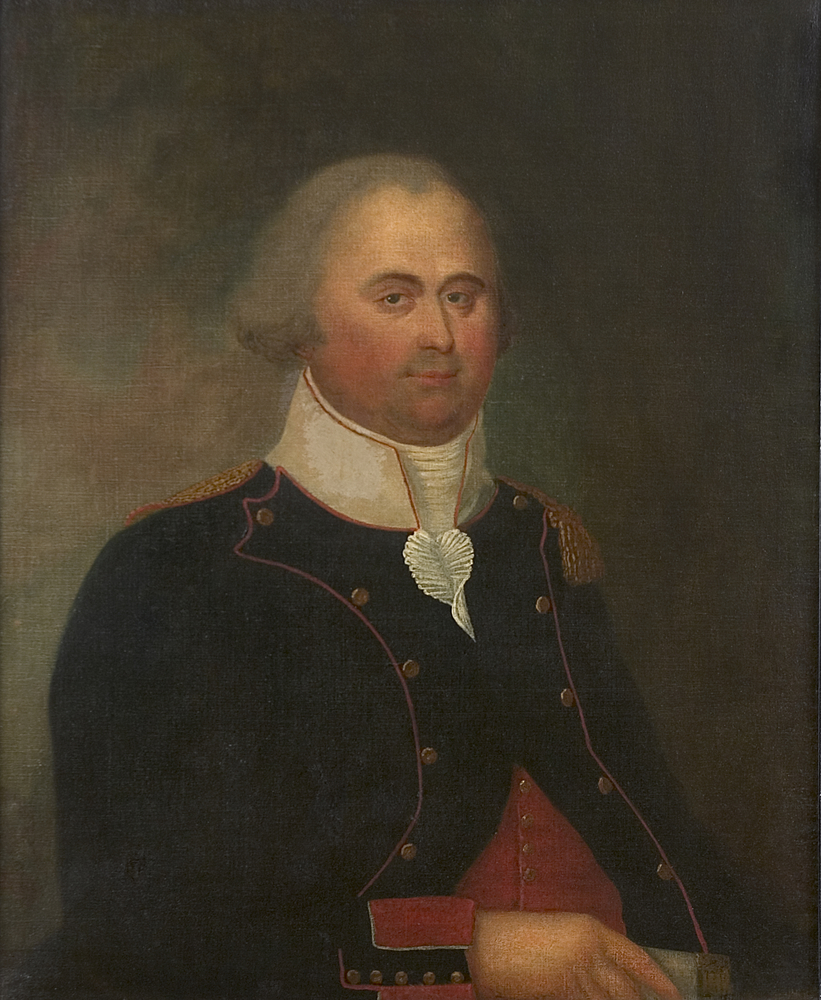
- 1794 portrait of Douville
- Born: August 7, 1745; Havre-Saint-Pierre, Saint John's Island
- Died: July 17, 1794 (aged 48); Gosport, Hampshire
- Burial place: Portsmouth, Hampshire
- Spouse: Cynthia Aborn (m. 1778)
- Children: Pierre Jr., Cynthia, Lowrey Charles, Samuel Joseph, and Mary Douville
- Military career
- Allegiance: United States; France
- Branch: Continental Navy; French Navy
- Service years: 1776–1783 (Continental Navy); 1793–1794 (French Navy)
- Rank: Lieutenant (Continental Navy); Ship-of-the-line captain (French Navy)
- Conflicts: American Revolutionary War; Yorktown campaign; French Revolution; Glorious First of June (POW)
- Awards: Medal for service after the War; Original Member of the Society of the Cincinnati

Ship-of-the-line Captain Pierre Douville (August 7, 1745 – July 17, 1794) was a French naval officer who served in the American Revolutionary War and French Revolutionary Wars. Born on present day Prince Edward Island, Douville was deported to France in 1758 as part of the expulsion of the Acadians. He joined the French Navy and lived in Rhode Island during the American Revolutionary War. During the Revolutionary War, he served as a French military intelligence officer who provided General George Washington with British ship and troop movements. Douville also took part in a smuggling mission in 1775, when he brought weapons and gunpowder from the French West Indies to the United States. Douville was one of the original members of the Society of the Cincinnati. Douville died in 1794 after being captured by the British at the Glorious First of June.

== Early life ==
Pierre Douville was born on August 7, 1745, in the French colonial village of Havre-Saint-Pierre, otherwise known as St. Peter's, on St. John Islant, present day Prince Edward Island. He was the youngest son and the tenth child of François Douville and Mary Roger. François was the first inhabitant of Havre-Saint-Pierre and came to the island in 1719. Originally from Normandy, François was shipwrecked on the island in 1719, "farther to the east [from where Havre-Saint-Pierre would be settled], at Naufrage." In a 1752 census, François was one of the wealthiest inhabitants on the island, working as a "fisherman, navigator, and ploughman or farmer."

In 1758, Pierre's family was forced to leave Havre-Saint-Pierre as part of the expulsion of the Acadians. During the French and Indian War, the 1758 Ile Saint-Jean campaign by British forces resulted in deportation of all Acadians from St. John. The British placed Havre-Saint-Pierre's inhabitants on a transport ship bound for Saint-Malo, France before burning the empty village. The ship Pierre and his family were on arrived at Saint-Malo in January 1759 after three months at sea. Within a few months of arriving in France, three sisters and one brother of Pierre died from disease.

Until 1763, Douville and his family lived in Saint-Servan. By 1763, the French and Indian War had ended. Even though France had ceded all of New France to Britain and Spain, the British returned Saint Pierre and Miquelon to the French. Douville and his family left Saint-Servan for Saint Pierre and Miquelon in June 1763 on Marie Charlotte. When the Douville family arrived at Miquelon they were granted land on the Ile-aux-Chiens, which was located in the harbor of Saint Pierre.

== Beginning of maritime career ==
In 1764 Douville left his family for a life at sea. His first job was aboard the fluyt La Nounou. The ship was contracted by French authorities to transport "displaced Acadians from Europe to Cayenne in French Guiana." In 1765, at the age of twenty, Douville was promoted to second lieutenant aboard the ship Deux Amis. Deux Amis transported 45 Acadians to France from Saint Pierre and Miquelon in 1765. The Acadians were forced to leave the French colony due to its overpopulation. Between 1765 and 1770, Douville worked on merchant ships that traded goods between Saint Pierre and Miquelon and New England. Around 1770, Douville moved first to Pawtucket, and then to Providence, Rhode Island. He became "a shipmaster working for wealthy merchant houses" up until the American Revolution. Douville's knowledge of the New England coast would make him an important asset in the war.

== American Revolution ==
In November 1775, Douville was involved in a mission with Nicholas Brown Sr. and Jonathan Clark Jr. In a collection of letters from the Naval Documents of the American Revolution, Volume 1, Pierre was referenced in a letter sent from Nicholas Cooke, the Governor of Rhode Island, to General George Washington, on September 9, 1776. The purpose of the operation was to import gunpowder into the United States from either France or the French West Indies. Referred to as "Mr. Du Ville", Cooke informed Washington that Douville "is esteemed a Person every Way well qualified, and to be depended upon, for the Execution of the Plan he proposes." Douville's plan, Cooke explained, was to voyage to Bayonne, France, "where he is well acquainted, and there take in a load of [gun]powder" onto his ship. The plan would work, Cooke explained, because the ship "can be effected in Three Days," which would not be enough time for British "intelligence of the Vessel cannot be sent to England timely enough for any measures to be taken to intercept [the ship] upon her Return." In another letter to Washington, from September 14, 1775, Cooke stated that the Colony of Connecticut was meeting that day to discuss Douville's "Voyage to Bayonne". He recommended that the operation happen now "and return upon this Coast in the Winter," because "the Enemy's Ships are unable to cruise" at that point. Washington approved of the voyage in a response letter to Cooke on September 18.

On November 15, 1775, Nicholas Brown sent a letter to Charles Jovett, a shipowner and acquaintance of Douville's. The letter requested Jovett should take a "load of good merchtb codfish delivered [to Providence, Rhode Island] between this and the first of March... But above all that Most Wanting is Cannon and Pistle Powder." The codfish would hide the gunpowder that Douville planned to smuggle in from France. Brown sent a letter to Douville and Jonathan Clark on November 15, 1775, confirming the plan. The plan was for Jovett to send Douville and Clark a ship that will either take them to the French West Indies or France for gunpowder and other weapons. Jovett was under orders from Brown to "Make full Insurance, upon what interest [Brown] may have onboard his Vessel Agst all resques, in eigther passage from St. Peters here or, from France here." The ship "Must be Deld in this Colony before the first day of April next at furthest" because the Continental Congress would pay for the gunpowder "at half a [Dollar per pound]" if the ship arrived in the United States by that date.

Unfortunately, Douville and Clark's efforts were for nothing. A letter from Major General Israel Putnam to Washington on May 21, 1776, revealed that a French ship, called L'Amiable Marie, arrived in Long Island on May 20 with "12 Tonns powder-500 Small Arms and dry Goods" as its cargo. However, an "English Captn with a Boats Crew came on shore for Assistance to land his Goods, soon after the French Capt who was on Board-saw a small Sloop to Leward beating up to him, 'tis supposed he thot them friends" and the 'French Capt' "immediately weigh'd anchor." The 'French Capt' was Douville. Realizing that the boat was British and not American, Douville attempted to make it to the New Jersey Highlands, hoping he could "land his goods up one of the short rivers in proximity to" where American forces were located. However, HMS Asia captured L'Amiable Marie on May 20, 1776. The capture of L'Amiable Marie was mentioned in a letter sent to Washington by Commodore Esek Hopkins on September 2, 1776.

== Naval career ==
In 1776, Douville was commissioned into the Continental Navy at the rank of lieutenant, serving on the 24-gun frigate USS Alfred as her third lieutenant; he was promoted to second lieutenant in 1777. In March 1778, Alfred was captured by the British navy near Barbados. Douville would have been sent to Forton Prison in England, but he was exchanged for a British officer held by the French in the West Indies in 1778. Gaining his freedom, Douville was able to be back in Rhode Island in time for his wedding to Cynthia Aborn. From July to August 1778, Douville served as a liaison officer on Languedoc, the flagship of the French fleet at Rhode Island. The flagship was under the command of Vice-admiral Charles Henri Hector, Count of Estaing. It has been suggested by some sources that Douville was ordered to be stationed on Languedoc at Washington's request due to his extensive knowledge of the New England coast.

In 1780, Douville served as a lieutenant onboard the 28-gun frigate USS Queen of France at Charleston, South Carolina, which was besieged by British forces. When the city was about to fall, Queen of France was scuttled in May before Douville and the rest of the Franco-American defenders of Charleston were captured. Douville was soon released by the British at the insistence of French Captain Louis-René Levassor de Latouche Tréville. He and several other Continental Navy officers were released in mid-July. From August 16, 1780, to November 30, 1782, Douville served a liaison officer on the French ships of the line Duc de Bourgogne, Neptune, and Triomphant. When the Revolutionary War ended in 1783, Douville returned to Rhode Island to be with his family.

== Postwar career ==
On October 5, 1784, Douville became a member of the Society of the Cincinnati, an award given to those "who had distinguished themselves" during the Revolutionary War. In 1784, Douville resumed working in maritime trading. His work had him make numerous trips to the West Indies on the sloop Cynthia and the schooner Cynthia, both of which were named after his wife. In 1787, Douville brought Cynthia and their son Peter to Saint Pierre and Miquelon to live while Douville continued his work in the West Indies. By 1789, the family had returned to Rhode Island. In December 1792, Douville traveled to France, intending on resuming his naval career.

== French Revolution and death ==
Douville, desiring to "be useful to his country", was commissioned into the French Navy in January 1793. He was assigned as lieutenant to the ship Achilles, whose mission was to protect the coastline of Brittany and the Loire River. On February 25, 1794, Douville became the captain of l'Impeteux. Douville's ship was part of Admiral Louis Thomas Villaret de Joyeuse's squadron, which was tasked with protecting a convoy transporting grain from the United States to France to stave off a looming famine resulting from the failure of that year's harvest, revolutionary chaos and the blockade of French ports and trade. A British fleet led by Admiral Earl Howe was tasked with destroying the convoy and the French squadron.

Villaret and Howe's fleets sighted each other on May 28 and fought a major fleet action on June 1, 1794. At the Glorious First of June, Achilles dismasted HMS Marlborough. However, Douville was injured 18 times during the battle, and he and his ship were captured by the British. Douville died on July 17 while imprisoned in Forton Prison in Gosport, Hampshire. He was buried in Portsmouth with the honors of war.

== Personal life ==
Douville married Cynthia Aborn on July 26, 1778, in Providence, Rhode Island, a week after Cynthia turned eighteen years old. They had five children; Pierre in 1781, Cynthia in 1783, Lowrey Charles in 1786, Samuel Joseph in 1788, and Mary in 1789. When Douville died, Cynthia Aborn received a pension from the French government until her death in October 1806. One of Douville's descendants was the actor Charles Coburn, an American film actor known for his role in the 1953 film Gentlemen Prefer Blondes. Brown University has a painting of Douville. The painter is unknown, but it was completed in France before Douville's death. It was given to Brown University in 1887 by Douville's granddaughters, Miss Cynthia Douville and Mrs. Sarah A. Tinkham.

== See also ==
- Intelligence in the American Revolutionary War
- Intelligence operations in the American Revolutionary War
- Society of the Cincinnati
- Category: French Canadians in the American Revolution
- French Revolution
- Deportation of the Prince Edward Island Acadians by Earle Lockerby
- L'Odysée d'un Acadian dans les Marines Americains et Française by Raymond Douville

== Bibliography ==
=== English language ===
- Cynthia Aborn, 1760–1806. Ancestry.com. Accessed 29 November 2016. http://person.ancestrylibrary.com/tree/12279678/person/-297465842/story.
- Pierre Douville, 1745–1794. Ancestry.com. Accessed 29 November 2016. http://person.ancestrylibrary.com/tree/12279678/person/-297465841/story.
- Brown, Nicholas. Nicholas Brown to Pierre Douville and Jonathan Clark, 15 November 1775. In Naval Documents of the American Revolution, Volume 2, edited by American Naval Records Society, 1032. New York: American Naval Records Society, 2012. http://ibiblio.org/anrs/docs/E/E3/ndar_v02p08.pdf.
- Cook, Nicholas. Nicholas Cook to George Washington, 9 September 1775. In Naval Documents of the American Revolution, Volume 2, edited by American Naval Records Society, 57–58. New York: American Naval Records Society, 2012. http://ibiblio.org/anrs/docs/E/E3/ndar_v02p01.pdf.
- Cook, Nicholas. Nicholas Cook to George Washington, 14 September 1775. In Naval Documents of the American Revolution, Volume 2, edited by American Naval Records Society, 96–97. New York: American Naval Records Society, 2012. http://ibiblio.org/anrs/docs/E/E3/ndar_v02p01.pdf.
- Emlen, Robert. "Pierre Douville Portrait Collection." Brown University Office of the Curator. Accessed October 29, 2016. https://library.brown.edu/cds/portraits/display.php?idno=262.
- Gardiner, Asa Bird. The Order of the Cincinnati in France. The Rhode Island State Society of Cincinnati, 1905, xiii.
- Hamilton, William Baillie. Place Names of Atlantic Canada. Toronto, Canada: University of Toronto Press. 1996. 477.
- Heath, William. To George Washington from William Heath, 21 June 1780. In Founders Online, National Archives. October 5, 2016.
- Hopkins, Esek. To George Washington from Commodore Esek Hopkins, 2 September 1776. In Founders Online, National Archives. Original source: The Papers of George Washington, Revolutionary War Series, Volume 6, 13 August 1776–20 October 1776, edited by Philander D. Chase and Frank E. Grizzard Jr., 201–202. Charlottesville: University Press of Virginia, 1994.
- Morris, Robert, and John Catanzariti. The Papers of Robert Morris, 1781–1784. Pittsburgh: University of Pittsburgh Press, 1984. https://books.google.com/books?id=AqyUvZlLIoEC&dq=pierre+douville+1794&source=gbs_navlinks_s.
- "Pierre Douville, Lieutenant." Continental Navy. 5 September 2016. http://continentalnavy.com/archives/2016/pierre-douville-lieutenant/.
- Putnam, Israel. Major General Israel Putnam to George Washington, 21 May 1776. In Naval Documents of the American Revolution, Volume 2, edited by American Naval Records Society, 187–188. New York: American Naval Records Society, 2012. http://ibiblio.org/anrs/docs/E/E3/ndar_v05p02.pdf.
- Washington, George. George Washington to Nicholas Cook,18 September 1775. In Naval Documents of the American Revolution, Volume 2, edited by American Naval Records Society, 132. New York: American Naval Records Society, 2012. http://ibiblio.org/anrs/docs/E/E3/ndar_v02p02.pdf.

=== French language ===
- Arsenault, Georges. "Pierre Douville: Un Illustre Fils de L'Île Saint-Jean." Museeacadian.org. last modified 2008. http://museeacadien.org/lapetitesouvenance/?tag=1745
- Arsenault, Georges. "Honouring the Memory of François Douville: Havre-Saint-Pierre, or St. Peter's Harbour, is an Historical Site of Great Significance." The Guardian (Charlottetown. 1955) (0832-2708).
- Étienne Taillemite, Dictionnaire des marins français, Tallandier, 2002, p. 143
- Gérard Scavennec, Pierre Douville, Chronique d'histoire maritime, 2002, n°46, p. 34–62
- Gérard Scavennec, Pierre Douville, Racines et Rameaux Français d'Acadie, 1994, n°11, p 2-8 http://www.rrfa.fr/bull/11.pdf
- Raymond Douville, L'Odyssée d'un Acadien dans les marines américaine et française, Cahiers des Dix, 18, 1953
