= Lillian Burke =

Artist and occupational therapist

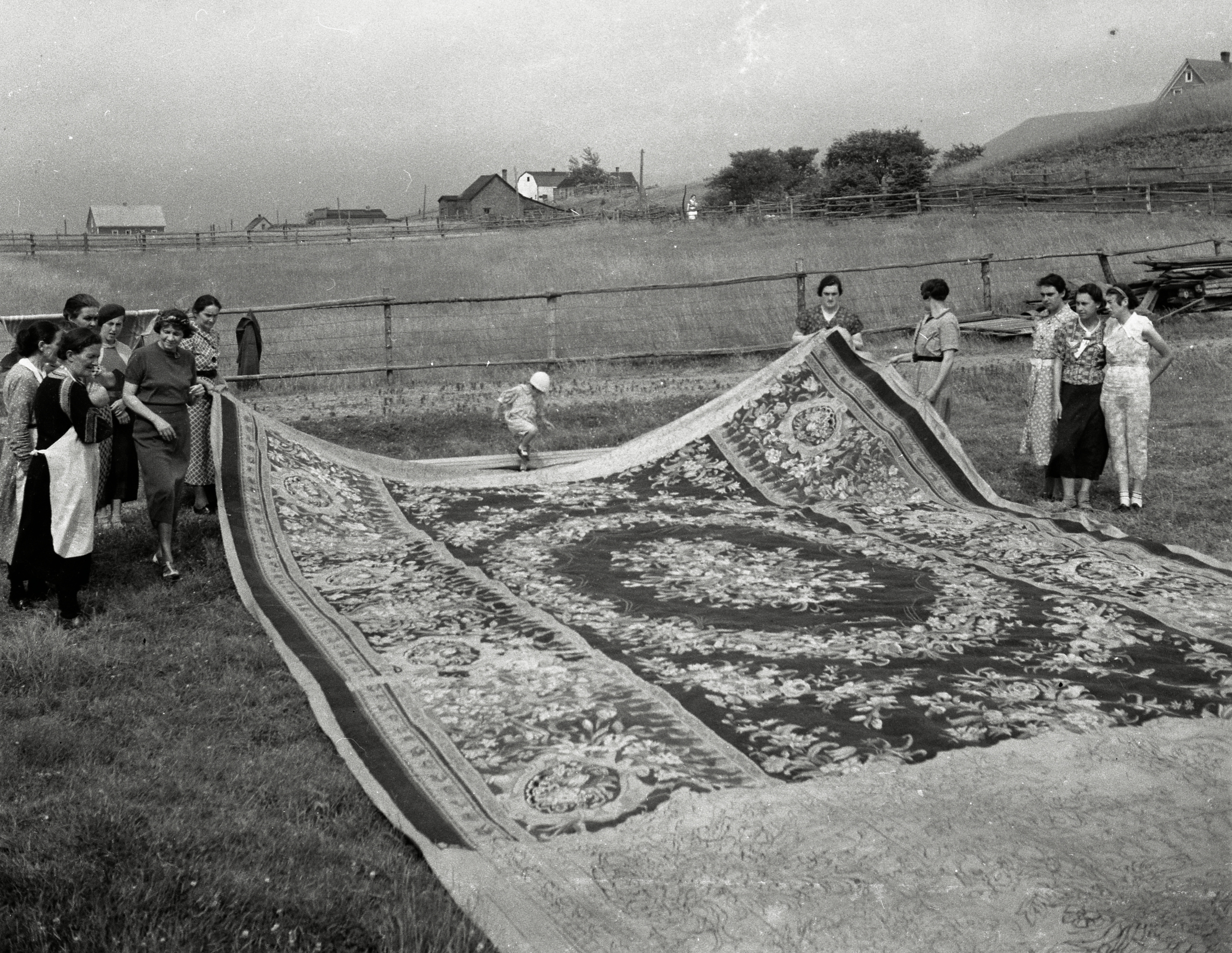
Lillian Burke, standing left, with short bob haircut, shown with 648 sq. ft. hooked Savonnerie rug, reputed to be the largest ever created

Lillian Burke (4 October 1879 – 13 April 1952) was an American artist, teacher, musician and early occupational therapist, known for developing a hooked-rug cottage industry in the village of Chéticamp, Cape Breton. From 1927 until 1940, Burke taught the French-speaking women of the village how to create high-quality hooked rugs based on her designs. Most of the rugs were commissioned by leading New York decorators on behalf of their affluent clients.

== Early life and education ==
Mary Lillian Burke was born on October 4, 1879, in Washington, D.C. She was the eldest of five children. Her parents, Michael Burke and Mary Wasney were from working class, Polish and Irish immigrant families. Her three-year-old brother died in 1886. When she was eight, her father died from pulmonary tuberculosis. The following year, her two year old sister died. Her mother returned to the Government Printing Office to provide for the family, where she had worked before her marriage in 1879. She worked 10-hour days, six days a week, sewing and binding government documents. Burke became a surrogate mother, caring for two younger siblings.

Burke attended Peabody Elementary School in Washington's Stanton Square. Various records indicate that she also attended St. Cecilia's Academy as a part-time student where she would have studied music, sewing and painting. In 1893, Burke was admitted to Eastern High School which offered new courses in physical training, home economics and fine art including drawing, painting and sculpture alongside learning by doing, problem solving, critical thinking, entrepreneurship and social responsibility.

She graduated in 1898 and won a scholarship to attend the two-year, teacher training program at Washington Normal School. There she would have taken courses in "child study" or psychology as well as such subjects as music, physical culture, sewing, elocution, penmanship and drawing.

== Career ==
=== Occupational therapy ===
Burke enlisted as a Reconstruction Aide (OT) offering rehabilitation in U.S. Army Hospitals in the United States and overseas, during and after World War 1. She served with the American Expeditionary Forces in France and Germany. In 1921 Burke was at the Station Hospital, Coblenz where she was appointed Head Reconstruction Aide and remained until the mid-1920s. She continued as an occupational therapist at Walter Reed Hospital, a military hospital in Washington, D.C, where she taught metal work. Burke was motivated by supporting people to be creative, by using their hands to interpret the beauty hidden in their souls. She treated Ralph Grimm, a severely injured soldier who became a silversmith and opened his own shop.

In 1927, Burke left Walter Reed Hospital to pursue her career as an artist. She worked with women in Chéticamp developing a hooked-rug cottage industry.

Burke returned to occupational therapy in 1942, when she worked at the New York State Psychiatric Institute in Manhattan, becoming assistant head of occupational therapy.

=== Hooked-rug cottage industry ===
Burke worked with Marion Hubbard Bell Fairchild, the youngest daughter of Alexander Graham Bell whose wife Mabel had founded Cape Breton Home Industries to train young women in lace-making and fine needlework as a way of earning extra money. After Mabel Bell's death in 1923, Burke and Fairchild re-established the organization to market hooked rugs in an attempt to alleviate the poverty that prevailed in Atlantic Canada during the 1920s and 1930s. One account reports that the hooked-rug trade brought tens of thousands of dollars into Chéticamp each year during the Great Depression when Cape Breton lumber camps were closed, the gypsum mine was not operating and fish sold at low prices.

Influenced by William Morris and his Arts and Crafts movement, Burke created hundreds of rug designs including ones decorated with flowers, birds, animals, trellises and ribbons. The finished rugs were hooked using dyed, home-spun yarn in the soft, muted tones that Morris favoured and that became fashionable among collectors who valued handcrafted textiles over mass produced rugs. One of her most notable creations was a 648-square-foot rug based on an intricate 17th century French design. It took her three months to block out the pattern for this 1937 Chéticamp Savonnerie carpet on its burlap underlay.

By the mid-1930s, Burke began to face resistance from the Acadian women who were producing ever-larger hooked rugs in factory-like conditions with delayed payments based on the finished product, not the hours spent producing it. Unfounded rumours circulated that Burke was making huge profits while steep increases in U.S. customs tariffs combined with the need to pay postage made the Chéticamp hooked rugs increasingly uncompetitive. To make ends meet, Burke took a part-time job in 1930 as an attendant at the State Mental Hospital in Brooklyn.

== Death and legacy ==
Mary Lillian Burke died on 13 April 1952 at Wynkoop Nursing Home, Leesburg, Virginia. She was 72. The cause of death was cerebral haemorrhage. She was buried at the Mount Olivet, a Catholic Cemetery in Washington D.C.

Burke’s legacy, particularly her contribution to the hooked-rug cottage industry is contested. She has been criticised for demanding high standards, imposing an urban aesthetic on rural women and profiteering from selling the rugs in New York. Burke created an artistically and commercially successful cottage industry that provided employment for the people of Chéticamp during the Great Depression.
