= Harry Herbert Miller =

US Navy Medal of Honor quartermaster (1879-1968)

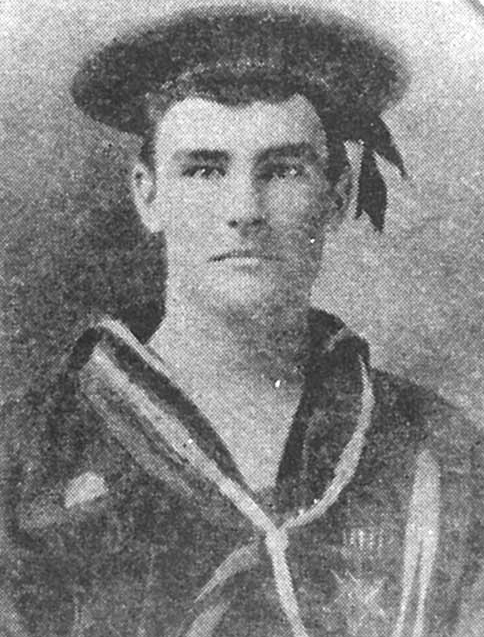
- Harry H. Miller
- Born: May 4, 1879; Noel Shore, Nova Scotia, Canada
- Died: March 12, 1968 (aged 88); Costa Rica
- Relatives: Willard D. Miller, brother – fellow Medal of Honor recipient
- Military career
- Allegiance: United States
- Branch: United States Navy
- Rank: Quartermaster Third Class
- Unit: USS Nashville
- Conflicts: Spanish–American War; *Battle of Cienfuegos
- Awards: Medal of Honor

Harry Herbert Miller (May 4, 1879 – March 12, 1968) was a United States Navy sailor and a recipient of America's highest military decoration—the Medal of Honor—for his actions in the Spanish–American War.

== Biography ==
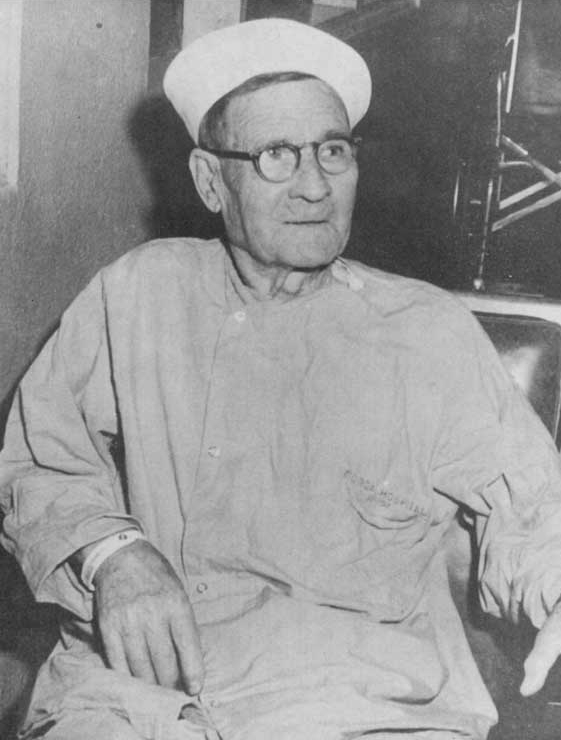
Harry H. Miller at Gorga Hospital, Costa Rica, in 1960.

Harry Miller enlisted in the U.S. Navy from the state of Massachusetts and served during the Spanish–American War on board USS Nashville (PG-7) (Gunboat #7). On May 11, 1898, he was one of several men who took part in a boat expedition that cut the underwater telegraph cable off Cienfuegos, Cuba. For his "extraordinary bravery and coolness" under enemy fire during this operation (the Battle of Cienfuegos), Miller was awarded the Medal of Honor. His brother, Willard Miller, also participated in the battle and was too awarded the Medal of Honor, making the two men one of only eight pairs of brothers to have received the medal. He attained the rank of Quartermaster Third Class before leaving the service. He eventually moved to Costa Rica, where he died at the age of 88.

== Medal of Honor citation ==
Rank and organization: Seaman, U.S. Navy.
Place and date: On board the U.S.S. Nashville, Cienfuegos, Cuba, May 11, 1898.
Entered service at: Massachusetts. Born: May 4, 1879, Noel Shore, Nova Scotia in Hants County.
G.O. No.: 521, July 7, 1899.

Citation:

On board the U.S.S. Nashville, during the operation of cutting the cable leading from Cienfuegos, Cuba, 11 May 1898. Facing the heavy fire of the enemy, Miller displayed extraordinary bravery and coolness throughout this action.

== See also ==
- List of Medal of Honor recipients
- List of Medal of Honor recipients for the Spanish–American War
