= Noel Shore, Nova Scotia =

Community in Nova Scotia, Canada

Noel Shore
- Location in Nova Scotia
- Coordinates: 45°18′39″N 63°38′51″W
- Country: Canada
- Province: Nova Scotia
- County: Hants County
- Municipality: East Hants Municipality
- Time zone: UTC-4 (AST)
  - Summer (DST): UTC-3 (ADT)
- Canadian Postal Code: B0N
- Area code: 902
- Telephone Exchange: 883
- NTS Map: 011E05
- GNBC Code: CBBQA

Noel Shore is a community in the Canadian province of Nova Scotia, located in the Municipal District of East Hants. The community is named after Noel Doiron and may have originally been named Vil Robere. Acadians left the area during the Acadian Exodus (1710). Birthplace of one of the famous "Miller Brothers", Harry Herbert Miller winner of the American Medal of Honor for actions during the Spanish–American War. His brother, Willard Miller was born in the neighbouring community of Maitland, Nova Scotia.
