= CIPU-FM =

First Nations community radio station in Supekne'kati, Nova Scotia

- Sipekne'katik, Nova Scotia; Canada
- Broadcast area: Sipekneꞌkatik First Nation
- Frequency: 97.1 MHz
- Branding: Shubie FM

Programming
- Format: First Nations community radio

Ownership
- Owner: Sipekneꞌkatik First Nation

History
- First air date: 2011

Technical information
- Licensing authority: CRTC
- ERP: 50 watts
- HAAT: 23 metres (75 ft)
- Transmitter coordinates: 45°05′44″N 63°29′26″W

CIPU-FM is a First Nations community radio station which broadcast at 97.1 FM in Sipekne'katik, Nova Scotia, Canada.

== History ==
On December 8, 2011, the Canadian Radio-television and Telecommunications Commission (CRTC) approved Shubie FM Radio's application to operate a new an English and Mi'kmaq, low-power Type B Native FM radio station. Shubie FM is a volunteer-run community radio station. It operates out of Sipekne'katik (Indian Brook) Reservation (Micmac).
