= Hants County, Nova Scotia =

County in Nova Scotia, Canada

Hants County
- County
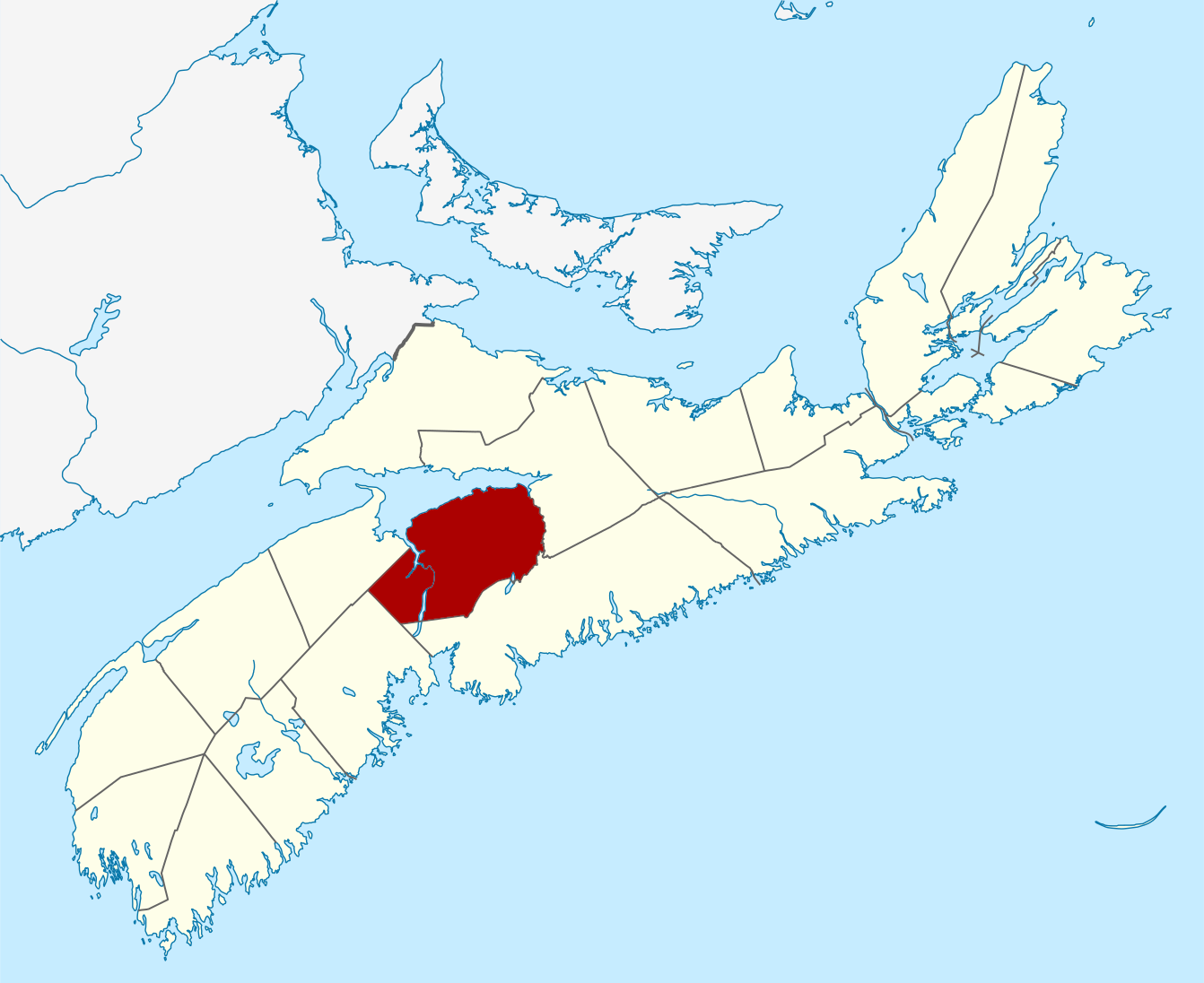
- Location of Hants County, Nova Scotia
- Coordinates: 45°06′N 63°54′W
- Country: Canada
- Province: Nova Scotia
- Municipalities: East Hants / West Hants Regional Municipality
- Established: June 17, 1781
- Divided into District Municipalities: April 17, 1879
- Electoral districts Federal: Kings—Hants
- Provincial: Hants East / Hants West

Area
  - Land: 3,049.08 km^{2} (1,177.26 sq mi)

Population (2006)
  - Total: 41,182
  - Density: 13.5/km^{2} (35/sq mi)
  - Change 2001-06: ▲1.7%
  - Census Rankings: District municipalities; East Hants West Hants: Towns; Hantsport Windsor: Reserves; Indian Brook 14: 21,387 (179 of 5,008); 13,881 (272 of 5,008) 1,191 (1,839 of 5,008); 3,709 (862 of 5,008) 1,014 (2,039 of 5,008)
- Time zone: UTC−04:00 (AST)
  - Summer (DST): UTC−03:00 (ADT)
- Area code: 902
- Dwellings: 17,277
- Median Income*: $49,630
- Median household income, 2005 (all households)

Hants County is a historical county and census division of Nova Scotia, Canada. Local government is provided by the West Hants Regional Municipality, and the Municipality of the District of East Hants.

== History ==
=== Formation ===
The county of Hants was established June 17, 1781, on territory taken from Kings County that consisted of the townships of Windsor, Falmouth and Newport. (Note: The words of the minutes of the Council of Nova Scotia for June 17, 1781 make it clear that the distance from Horton (the County town of Kings County) and the inconvenience of crossing the Avon River to transact county business were factors which led to a separate county being formed. Four and a half years later its boundaries were more precisely defined and set forth by the Governor and Council in 1785. The boundary lines of Hants were duly surveyed and confirmed by the Lieutenant Governor 1828.) The name Hants is a long-standing abbreviation for the English county of Hampshire, from the Old English name Hantescire. In 1861, Hants County was divided for court sessional purposes into two districts named East Hants and West Hants. In 1879, the two districts were incorporated as district municipalities. In 2020, the Town of Windsor amalgamated with the District of West Hants to become the West Hants Regional Municipality.

=== 18th century - origins ===
==== Miꞌkmaq ====
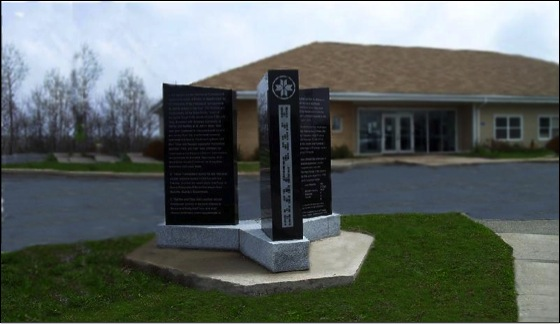
Monument to the Treaty of 1752, Shubenacadie First Nation, Nova Scotia

The Miꞌkmaq are the indigenous peoples who lived on these lands for centuries. In the course of their historical relationship with the Acadians, many Miꞌkmaq became Catholic and therefore played an active role in the Acadian resistance to the Protestant British annexation of Hants County. They were clearly supporters of Abbe LeLoutre's work in protecting Acadian and Miꞌkmaq and ultimately Catholic interests in the region. Within Hants County, they fought in the Battle at St. Croix on the St. Croix River.

There is a long history of missionary work in Hants County, such as the work of Silas Tertius Rand's work on Glooscap First Nation near Hantsport. There are still Miꞌkmaq communities in Hants County such as Indian Brook 14 (the home of the famous activist Anna Mae Aquash) and Shubenacadie 13. Shubenacadie is the oldest community in Hants County. There is a significant monument in the middle of the reserve to Major Jean-Baptiste Cope, the signatory to the peace Treaty of 1752 with the British, which was recently upheld by the Supreme Court of Canada (1985).

==== Acadians ====
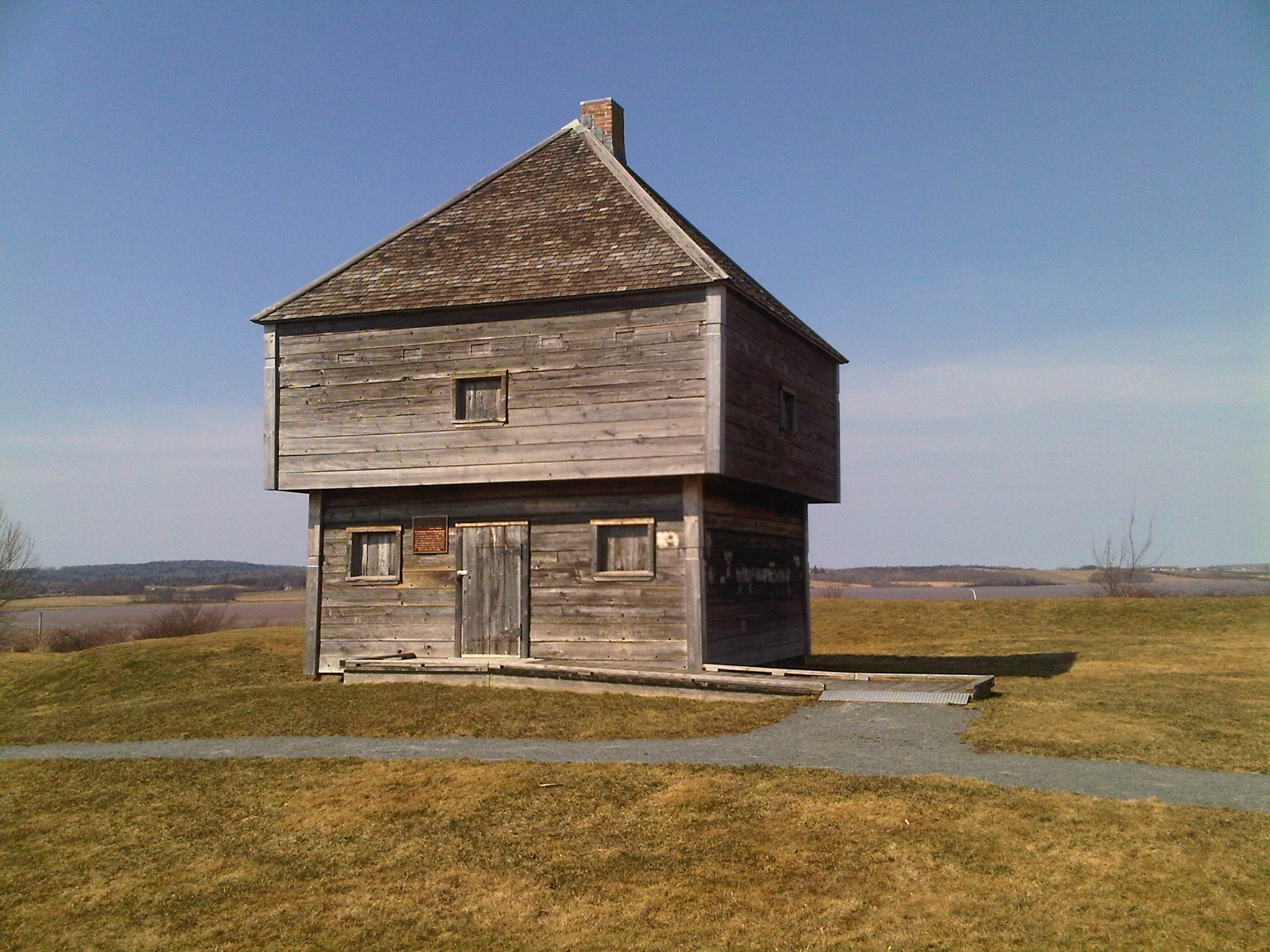
Fort Edward (built 1750). The oldest blockhouse in North America.

The first Acadians to settle in present-day Hants County (known as Pisiguit) established farms at (present day Falmouth) in the early 1680s, as the 1686 census shows a number of families on well established farms utilizing dyked pastures. More Acadian villages soon followed spreading along the shores of the Piziquid and St. Croix rivers. One of these was at present day Windsor. With an expanding population the region by 1722 was split into two parishes (see Pisiquit). The l'Assomption parish church was situated on a hill overlooking the confluence of the Pisiquit and Saint Croix rivers where in 1750 it was pulled down by the Acadians under orders from the British to make way for Fort Edward. By the early 1700s Acadians migrated all along the shore of Hants County to the Shubenacadie River. One of the most prominent Acadians from this area was Noël Doiron who is the namesake of the community of Noel. With the founding of both Halifax (1749) and Fort Edward, there was an Acadian Exodus that involved an emigration of most of the Acadians from the Municipality of East Hants (1750) and from West Hants (Pisiguit) as well. They left British Nova Scotia for French occupied Prince Edward Island. During the 1755 Expulsion of the Acadians the majority of those Acadians remaining were deported to various locations along the eastern seaboard of the Thirteen Colonies, most notably New England and Maryland. The Expulsion of the Acadians from Hants County began at exactly the same time as it happened at Grand-Pré, with the Acadian men being imprisoned within the walls of Fort Edward. Fort Edward was one of four British forts in Acadia to imprison Acadians throughout the nine years of the expulsion.

==== New England Planters ====
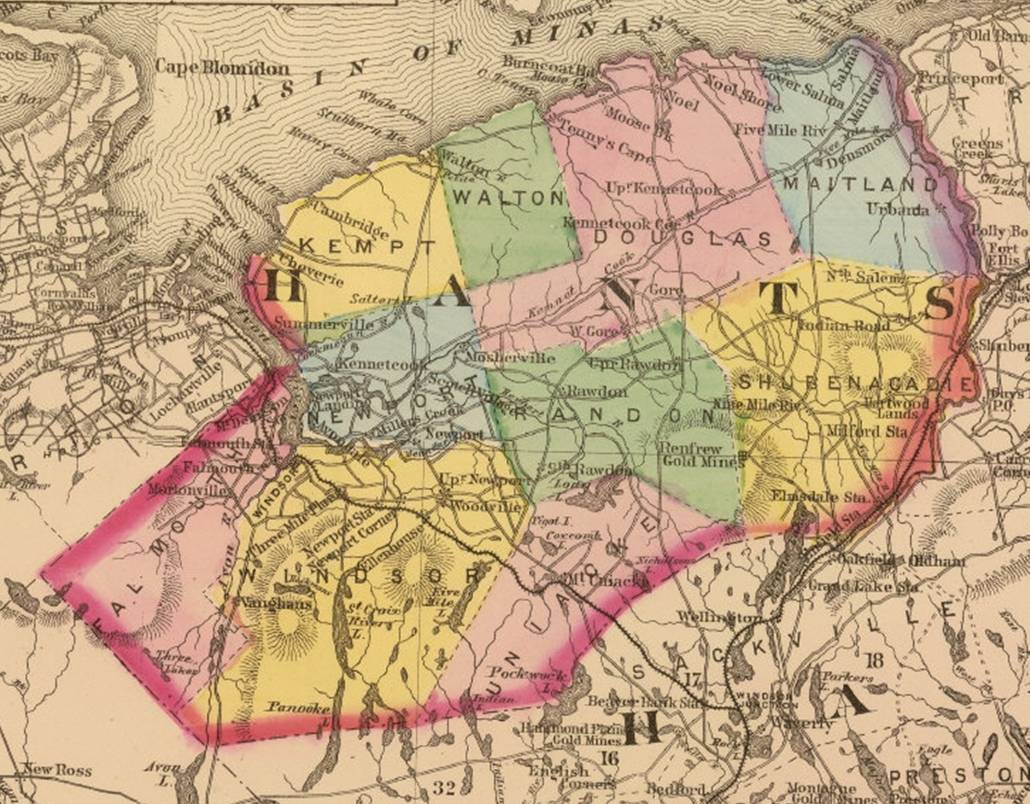
Hants County Township Map, 1879

After the Acadians were removed from the area of present-day Hants County, New England Planters began to arrive and settle the vacated lands (1760). They formed the townships of Windsor, Falmouth and Newport. Many arrived from Rhode Island. One of the Planters of note during this period was Henry Alline who led the New Light revival of the Great Awakening in the region. Alline's movement had a significant impact on the stance the New Englander Planters took with respect to the troubles building in the colonies to the west, between their British masters, and brethren who remained in New England, that led to the Revolutionary War. Alline's Newlight congregations were the progenitors of the Baptist movement in Canada.

==== Ulster Irish ====
The next wave of immigration to Hants County was the Ulster Scots people who settled all along the Cobequid shore such as the O'Briens in Noel (1771) and the Putnams in Maitland.

==== American Loyalists ====
During the American Revolution, Fort Edward played a pivotal role defending Halifax from a possible land attack and serving as the headquarters in Atlantic Canada for 84th Regiment of Foot (Royal Highland Emigrants). After the American Revolution, the Rawdon Township and Douglas Township were created for American Loyalists (1784). The Douglas Township (Kennetcook and area) was settled by the 84th Regiment of Foot. The Rawdon Township was settled by loyalists from South Carolina whose lives had been saved in the Siege of Ninety-Six by Lord Rawdon and the 84th Regiment of Foot.

=== 19th century - shipbuilding and confederation ===
==== Plaster War ====
Windsor developed its gypsum deposits, usually selling it to American markets at Passamaquoddy Bay. Often this trade was illegal. In 1820 an effort to stop this smuggling trade resulted in the "Plaster War", in which local smugglers resoundingly defeated the efforts of New Brunswick officials to bring the trade under their control.

==== Shipbuilding ====
Productive timber lands and tidal building sites made Hants County an important shipbuilding centre in the 19th century. Loyalist merchant Abraham Cunard was an early shipbuilder in the county. Cunard's efforts were surpassed by much larger yards by the mid 19th century, including the William Dawson Lawrence shipyard in Maitland which built the William D. Lawrence, the largest wooden ship ever built in Canada, and Ezra Churchill's in Hantsport.

==== Great Hants Campaign (1869) ====
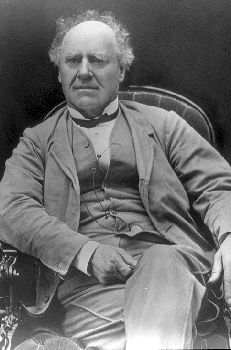
Joseph Howe, MP for Hants County

The Honourable Joseph Howe was the first member of parliament for Hants County (1867). He campaigned in the county with an agenda to punish those politicians who have forced Nova Scotia to participate in the formation, and become a part of Canada without a mandate or referendum from the people. Over the next two years in office, deciding not to mobilize to join America or become a colony independent of Britain, Howe determined that Nova Scotia's best option was to remain in Canada and to fight for "better terms. While most Nova Scotians remained supportive of the Anti-Confederation Campaign during this time period, Howe ran in Hants County bi-election of 1869 to get a mandate from the people to see if they wanted him to continue to support Nova Scotia's entry into Canada. What ensued was one of the most expensive political campaigns in Nova Scotia's history. The whole country watched to see if Howe would be returned to Ottawa to lead Nova Scotia into Confederation on the best terms possible. Howe toured the whole county and eventually won, which eventually led to all of Nova Scotia accepting Canada.

=== 20th century ===
Hants County produced two Olympians, both of whom came from along the Noel shore (see Athletics at the 1928 Summer Olympics – Men's marathon). Along with the great literary figure in Nova Scotia's history, Thomas Chandler Haliburton, Hants produced Alden Nowlan, George Elliott Clarke and others. The celebrated folk artist Sidney Kelsie who later made his career in Edmonton, Alberta was born in Hants County in 1928. Folk singer Stan Rogers made the community of Rawdon famous by writing the song "The Rawdon Hills".

== Natural resources: wood, fish, gypsum, barite, oil and gold ==
The wood in the county was both used to build the many wooden ships, but it was also used as an export resource on the wooden ships. For this purpose, the Midland Railway was also built through the County (1901), connecting Windsor and Truro.

The county is noted for very large deposits of gypsum, some of which was at one time shipped from Walton. The world's largest open pit gypsum mine is located in Milford, East Hants and currently produces approximately 8,000 tons of gypsum daily. George Elliot Clarke's poem, "West Hants County", tells of the difficult condition of black workers in the gypsum mines.

Barite was also an extremely important ore to Hants County. The largest barite mine in the world was in Walton and that; combined with the gypsum and lumbering, made Walton the second busiest port in Nova Scotia in the 1950s. The mine produced in total 4.5 million tonnes of barite, between 1941 and 1978. Silver, lead, zinc and copper were also found in the same mine and over 360,000 tonnes were mined. It is estimated that there are still about 1 million tonnes of barite left in the deposit.

Gold was mined at Renfrew, near Nine Mile River, The village was the home of one of the largest gold mines in the province. There were other gold mines in the community of Rawdon Gold Mines. There is currently oil exploration in and around Kennetcook.

== Communities ==
Towns

- Windsor

Reserves

- Indian Brook 14

Municipalities

- Municipality of the District of East Hants
- West Hants Regional Municipality

== Demographics ==
As a census division in the 2021 Census of Population conducted by Statistics Canada, Hants County had a population of 45,140 living in 18,862 of its 20,306 total private dwellings, a change of 6.1% from its 2016 population of 42,558. With a land area of 3,049.18 km^{2} (1,177.29 sq mi), it had a population density of 14.8/km^{2} (38.3/sq mi) in 2021.

Population trend

Census	Population	Change (%)
2016	42,558	▲0.6%
2011	42,304	▲2.7%
2006	41,182	▲1.7%
2001	40,513	▲2.6%
1996	39,483	▲4.3%
1991	37,843	▲3.5%
1986	36,548	▲10.3%
1981	33,121	N/A
1941	22,034	
1931	19,393	
1921	19,739	
1911	19,703	
1901	20,056	
1891	22,052	
1881	23,359	
1871	21,301	N/A

Mother tongue language (2011)

Language	Population	Pct (%)
English only	40,330	96.14%
French only	525	1.25%
Non-official languages	950	2.26%
Multiple responses	145	0.34%

Ethnic groups (2006)

Ethnic Origin	Population	Pct (%)
Canadian	18,915	46.3%
English	14,175	34.7%
Scottish	11,300	27.7%
Irish	8,360	20.5%
French	4,730	11.6%
German	4,720	11.6%
North American Indian	2,195	5.4%
Dutch (Netherlands)	2,010	4.9%

== Access routes ==
Highways and numbered routes that run through the county, including external routes that start or finish at the county limits:

- Highways
  - Hwy 101
  - Hwy 102
- Trunk routes
  - Trunk 1
  - Trunk 2
  - Trunk 14
- Collector routes:
  - Route 202
  - Route 214
  - Route 215
  - Route 236
  - Route 354
- External routes:
  - None

== See also ==
- List of counties of Nova Scotia
- List of communities in Nova Scotia
- Mount Uniacke, Nova Scotia
- Richard John Uniacke
