= Willard Miller =

United States Navy Medal of Honor recipient

Willard Dwight Miller
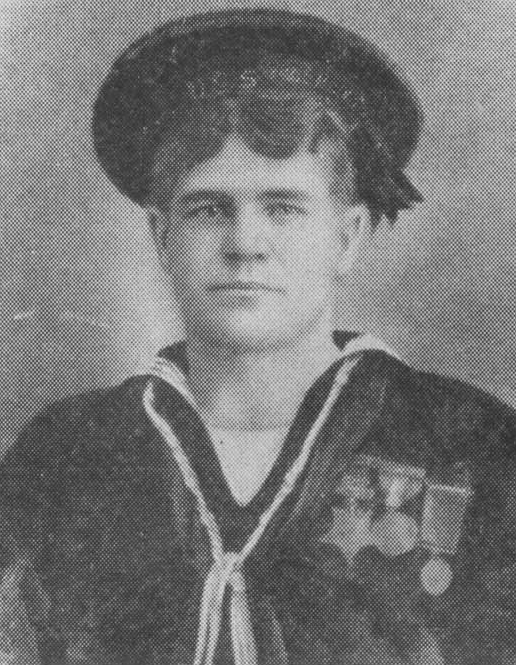
- Willard D. Miller
- Born: June 5, 1877; Maitland, Nova Scotia, Canada
- Died: February 19, 1959 (aged 81)
- Burial place: Arlington National Cemetery
- Relatives: Harry H. Miller, brother – fellow Medal of Honor recipient
- Military career
- Allegiance: United States of America
- Branch: United States Navy
- Rank: Seaman
- Unit: USS Nashville (PG-7)
- Conflicts: Spanish–American War; *Battle of Cienfuegos
- Awards: Medal of Honor
- Other work: U.S. Lighthouse Service

Willard Dwight Miller (June 5, 1877 – February 19, 1959) was a United States Navy sailor and a recipient of America's highest military decoration—the Medal of Honor—for his actions in the Spanish–American War.

== Biography ==
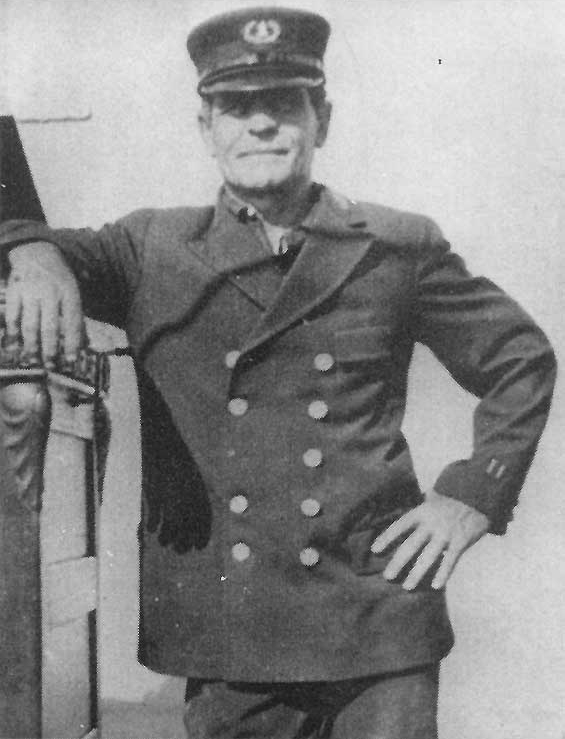
Willard Miller in the uniform of the U.S. Lighthouse Service

Willard Miller was born in Maitland, Nova Scotia on June 5, 1877. He enlisted in the U.S. Navy from the state of Massachusetts and served during the Spanish–American War as a crew member of the gunboat USS Nashville (PG-7). On May 11, 1898, he took part in a small boat operation that cut the underwater telegraph cable off Cienfuegos, Cuba, and received the Medal of Honor for his conduct during the action (the Battle of Cienfuegos).

Miller's younger brother, Harry Herbert Miller, was also awarded the Medal of Honor for the same action, making the two men one of only eight pairs of brothers to be awarded the medal.

Miller left the Navy in 1906 and later served in the U.S. Lighthouse Service.

He died on February 19, 1959, at age 81 and is buried in Arlington National Cemetery, Arlington County, Virginia. His grave can be found in Section 46, Lot 15.

== Medal of Honor citation ==
Seaman Miller's official Medal of Honor citation reads:

On board the U.S.S. Nashville during the operation of cutting the cable leading from Cienfuegos, Cuba, May 11, 1898. Facing the heavy fire of the enemy, Miller displayed extraordinary bravery and coolness throughout this action.

== See also ==
- List of Medal of Honor recipients
- List of Medal of Honor recipients for the Spanish–American War
