= Frieze and Roy =

Founded in 1839, Frieze and Roy was a shipping, shipbuilding and trading firm located in Maitland, Hants County, Nova Scotia, Canada. The firm was integral to the success of Maitland as a hub of shipbuilding in mid-to-late 19th century Nova Scotia. Its founder, David Frieze is regarded as one of the founding fathers of the community. The firm helped expand and develop local infrastructure, laying the groundwork for Maitland's most famous shipbuilder, William Dawson Lawrence.

== History ==
Sailing ships were being produced in Maitland from 1810, followed by a rapid growth industry over the subsequent decades. Helping to pioneer this growth was David Frieze, who in 1837 established a general goods store. Frieze envisioned a triple function enterprise for his business which including shipbuilding, trading timber and gypsum, and operating his store to service the growing population of the area. This placed Frieze in a key position in the budding Maitland business community. To initiate the first function of his enterprise, building ships, he enlisted the help of Scottish businessman Alexander Roy who had previously built the sailing ship Alice Roy. In 1868 they began to operate under the name Frieze and Roy.

Shipbuilding

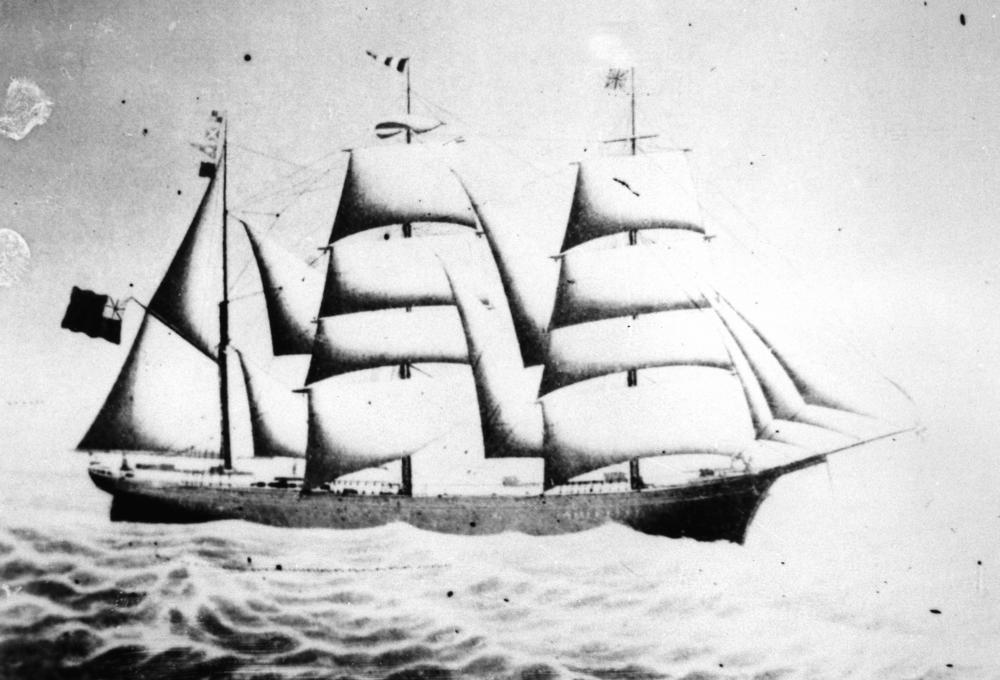
Snow Queen

Frieze and Roy launched their first and arguably most famous vessel, Snow Queen, a barque of 994 tons, in 1872. This was followed by Trust, a brig of 552 tons, in 1876. The last and largest project undertaken by the firm was Esther Roy, a ship of 1,533 tons, which was launched in 1877. She was later sold to an Italian company in 1895. The firm built ships for many Halifax based owners, such as Thomas Kenny who ordered Snow Queen.

Decline of Shipbuilding in the Maritimes

After the introduction and rise of larger, faster steamships in the late 19th century, wooden shipbuilding in Maitland, and all across the maritime provinces, ground to a halt. By the late 1880s the firm had shifted its focus on its store. Frieze and Roy still exists today as a general store located in Maitland. The store has been run by the family of Alexander Roy since the late 19th century, but is now in the hands of new owners. It is one of the oldest businesses in Nova Scotia. The firm is no longer involved in shipbuilding of any sort.

== List of Ships Built ==
- Snow Queen
- Lindall
- Trust
- Esther Roy
