= Lawrence House Museum =

Historic house in Nova Scotia, Canada

Coordinates: 45°19′21″N 63°30′09″W

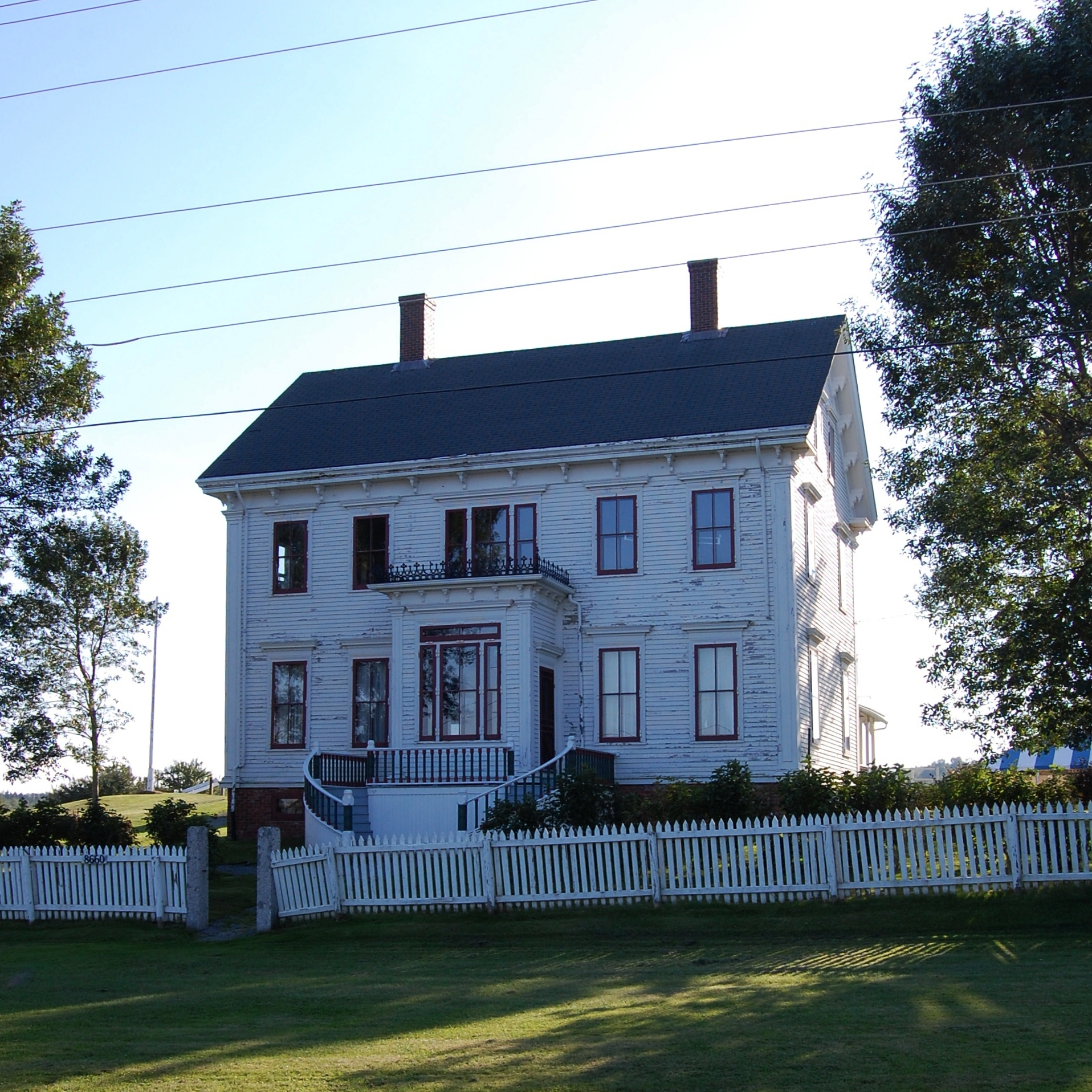
Lawrence House Museum (2008 photo)

The Lawrence House Museum is a national and provincial historic site located in Maitland, Nova Scotia. The museum operated as part of the Nova Scotia Museum system until its permanent closure in February 2026.

== History ==
Lawrence House was erected in Maitland, Nova Scotia around 1870 by notable shipbuilder and politician William Dawson Lawrence. He would continue living in the house until his death on 8 December 1886.

The house and surrounding property were recognized as a cultural heritage property under the Heritage Property Act on 4 August 1983.

Lawrence House Museum operated as a museum from June to October. The museum temporarily closed for the 2024 season due to staffing shortages, and was able to briefly reopen in 2025. However, in 2026, the government of Nova Scotia announced that the museum would be permanently closed following budget cuts.

== Description ==
The house itself is a large, two-and-a-half storey home overlooking the Shubenacadie River. The house is a Victorian interpretation of Georgian architecture with a symmetrical facade, gabled roof, and front portico.

The house is situated along Nova Scotia Route 215, near the Cobequid Bay where Lawrence's former shipyard is located.
