= Cathy Elliott =

Canadian artist (1957–2017)

- Born: June 5, 1957; Quebec
- Died: October 15, 2017; Essa
- Education: Humber Polytechnic, Toronto Metropolitan University
- Occupations: Artist; composer; actor; teacher; playwright

Cathy Elliott (1957–2017) was a Mi'kmaq artist, musician, composer and playwright and member of the Sipekne'katik Mi'kmaq First Nation in Nova Scotia, Canada. She was known for working with Indigenous youth across Canada to express their culture through theatre and documentary film. She worked for several years with the DAREarts program and also wrote the first all-Indigenous musical to be offered at the Charlottetown Festival. The musical, The Talking Stick, was premiered in Prince Edward Island for the visit of the Duke and Duchess of Cambridge in 2011. Elliott was struck by a car and killed while walking alongside a road in Essa, Ontario, on October 15, 2017.

== Early life and family ==
Elliott was born in Quebec on June 5, 1957, to Roger Cormier, an Acadian, and Frances Bernard Cormier, who was Irish and Mi'kmaq. Her maternal grandfather ran away from residential school. Roger Cormier worked in the financial sector and as a result, the family lived in a number of locations in Canada, as well as Majorca, Spain and Trinidad.

Elliott studied graphic arts at Humber College and theatre at Ryerson University in Toronto. Her early work was in set design, costumes and it was later she began to work more as a musician, director and actor.

Elliott was married to Peter Elliott and the marriage ended in 1991. Elliott moved in with her best friend and partner Leslie Arden in 1992. Arden and Elliott made their home in Alliston, Ontario. The two worked closely together and collaborated on a number of projects.

== Career ==
Elliott's professional career spanned more than thirty-five years where she was active in a variety of genres where she was featured as a writer, actor, playwright, composer and musician, making appearances across Canada. Her work frequently made reference to her Indigenous heritage and issues related to indigeneity in Canada.

Known also as an educator and for her commitment to future generations of Indigenous people, Elliott worked with Indigenous youth, particularly in Northern Ontario. She was also known for her work with theatre students.

In 2011, Elliott premiered a musical entitled The Talking Stick. The production was put on by the Young Company of the Charlottetown Festival and featured stories and songs of Indigenous people in Canada and the entire cast was made up of Indigenous youth.

Elliott had many credits as an actor taking part in productions in major cities across Canada, as well as smaller productions. In the summer of 2017, she appeared at the National Arts Centre in Ottawa in a musical by Corey Payette. Elliott played the part of Rita in Payette's Children of God is a story in which children from an Oji-Cree family are taken to a residential school in Northern Ontario. The National Arts Centre marked her death and contributions to arts in Canada by lowering their flags for three days.
