= New Ross 20 =

Coordinates: 44.845°N 64.413°W

Location of New Ross 20 in Nova Scotia

New Ross 20 is a Mi'kmaq reserve located in Lunenburg County, Nova Scotia.

It is administratively part of the Shubenacadie First Nation.
