= Pennal 19 =

Coordinates: 44.795°N 64.434°W

Location of Pennal 19 in Nova Scotia

Pennal 19 is a Mi'kmaq reserve located in Lunenburg County, Nova Scotia.

It is administratively part of the Shubenacadie First Nation.
