= Indian Brook 14 =

Mi'kmaq reserve in Nova Scotia, Canada

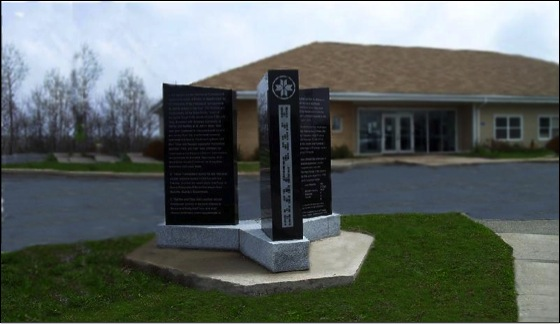
- Monument to the Treaty of 1752

- Location within Nova Scotia
- Coordinates: 45°5′25″N 63°29′15″W
- Country: Canada
- Province: Nova Scotia
- Municipality: East Hants Municipality

Population (2016)
  - Total: 1,089
- Time zone: UTC-4 (AST)
  - Summer (DST): UTC-3 (ADT)
- Postal code: B0N 2H0
- Area code: 902
- GNBC Code: CBUYS
- Part of a series about Places in Nova Scotia

Indian Brook 14 is a Mi'kmaq reserve located in Hants County, Nova Scotia.

It is administratively part of the Sipekneꞌkatik First Nation.

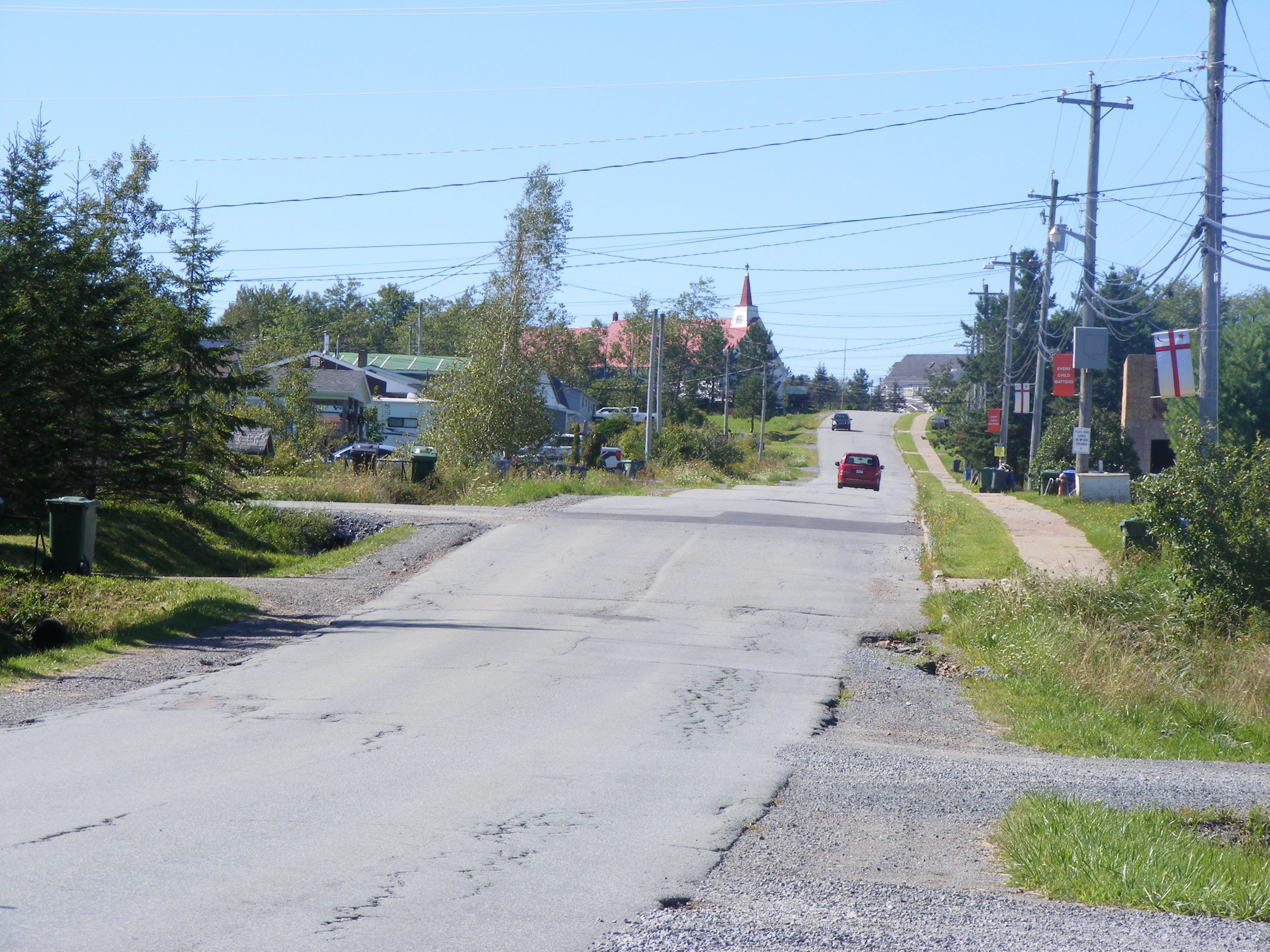
Indian Brook 14, July 2023.

== History ==
Father Louis-Pierre Thury sought to gather the Mi'kmaq of Peninsular Nova Scotia into a single settlement around Shubenacadie Nova Scotia as early as 1699. Not until Father Rale's War, however, did Antoine Gaulin, a Quebec-born missionary, erect a permanent mission at Shubenacadie (adjacent to Snides Lake and close to the former Residential school). He also make seasonal trips to Cape Sable, LaHave, and Mirlegueche.

The Shubenacadie mission's dedication to Saint Anne speaks to a spirit of accommodation on the part of both the French and the Mi'kmaq. Anne, traditionally identified as the mother of Mary, was the grandmother of Jesus himself. The esteemed position of grandmothers in Mi'kmaw society was a point of agreement between Roman Catholicism and the Mi'kmaw worldview, and highlights the complexity and contingency of the 'conversion' process.

In 1738, Father Jean-Louis Le Loutre arrived in October of that year at Mission Sainte-Anne, having spent the previous winter in Cape Breton learning the Mi'kmaw language with Abbé Pierre Maillard. During Father Rale's War and King George's War, Mission Sainte-Anne was a sort of military base along with being a place of worship. Coulon de Villiers' hardy troop passed this way on their brutal mid-winter march toward the Battle of Grand Pré in 1747, and Mi'kmaw warriors used the site as a staging point for their attacks on Halifax and Dartmouth during Father Le Loutre's War. During Father Le Loutre's War, Captain Matthew Floyer arrived at the Mission on August 18, 1754, and recorded:

Half after Twelve we came to the Masshouse, which I think is the neatest in the Country, 'tis Adorned with a Fine lofty Steeple and a Weather Cock. The Parsonage House is the only Habitation here, the land is good & seems to be more so on the opposite side.

Floyer's map, which accompanied his written report, suggests the presence of three structures at the mission site.

Twelve months later, the Expulsion of the Acadians began during the French and Indian War and by October 1755, Mission Sainte-Anne appears to have been destroyed. Oral tradition says the Mi'kmaq destroyed the mission to prevent it from falling into the New Englanders possession and dumped it into Snides Lake, which was adjacent to the mission.

== Notable residents ==
- Anna Mae Aquash - murdered American Indian Movement activist.
- Daniel N. Paul - Mi'kmaq elder, author, activist.
- Jean-Baptiste Cope - Chief who signed Treaty of 1752.
- Jean-Louis Le Loutre - Missionary Priest.
