= William D. Lawrence (ship) =

1874 full-rigged sailing ship

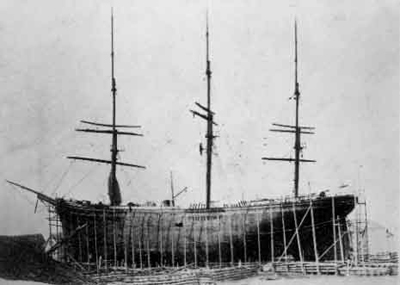

History

Canada
- Name: William D. Lawrence
- Owner: William Dawson Lawrence and James Ellis
- Port of registry: Maitland, Nova Scotia
- Builder: William D. Lawrence Shipyard, Maitland Nova Scotia
- Laid down: 1872
- Launched: October 27, 1874
- Maiden voyage: 1874-1875
- Identification: Code Letters NQDC
- Fate: Stranded English Channel, 1891, converted to barge, sunk in Dakar.
- Notes: Renamed Kommander Svend Foyn, 1883

General characteristics
- Tonnage: 2459 Gross Tons
- Length: 262 ft (80 m) between perpendiculars; 335 ft (102 m) Sparred Length
- Beam: 48 ft (15 m)
- Depth: 29 ft (8.8 m)
- Decks: 2
- Propulsion: Sail
- Sail plan: Full-rigged ship

William D. Lawrence was a full-rigged sailing ship built in Maitland, Nova Scotia, along the Minas Basin and named after her builder, the merchant and politician William Dawson Lawrence (1817–1886).

== Construction and career ==
Built in 1874 at the William D. Lawrence Shipyard in Maitland, she was the largest wooden sailing ship of her day, one of the largest wooden ships ever built and the largest sailing ship ever built in Canada. (Note: Two larger wooden sailing barques were built at Quebec, the Baron of Renfrew and Columbus, in 1824 and 1825, but they were disposable ships designed for one-way voyages across the Atlantic.) William Lawrence was a fierce opponent of Canadian Confederation which he predicted would bring ruin to Nova Scotia's flourishing shipbuilding industry. Initially planning to build a smaller vessel, he deliberately increased the size of William D. Lawrence to create a landmark vessel for the province's shipping industry before it declined. The vessel defied critics who claimed that a wooden vessel of its size would be unmanageable and lose money.

After several profitable years, the ship was sold to Norwegian owners in 1883 and renamed Kommandør Svend Foyn. She was stranded in the English Channel in 1891 and converted to a barge, later sinking in Dakar, Senegal.

== Commemorations ==
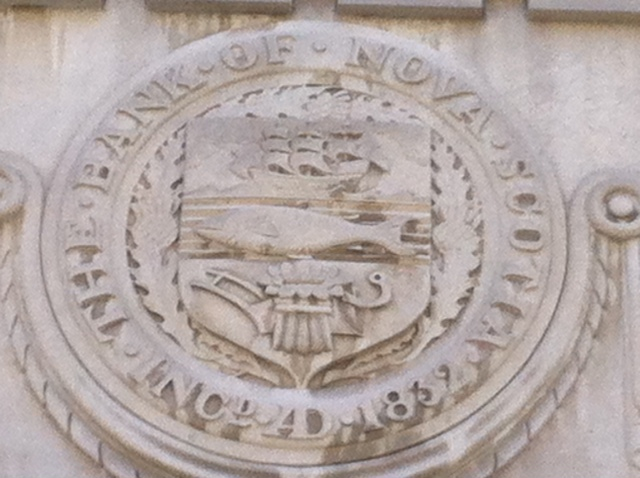
William D. Lawrence (ship) carved into the Bank of Nova Scotia Building, Hollis Street, Halifax, Nova Scotia

In 1930, William D. Lawrence and his great ship were commemorated by the Bank of Nova Scotia, which placed a stone carving of the ship above the door of the head office building in Halifax, Nova Scotia (located on Hollis Street, directly across from Province House). A monument dedicated to Lawrence's ship as a national historic treasure was erected on the grounds of his home in 1967, and his home was opened to the public as a provincial museum site on August 11, 1971. The ship has also been commemorated by the Canada Post with a postage stamp (1975) and the Royal Canadian Mint with a coin (2002).

The ship was the subject of at least three formal ship portraits, one at the Nova Scotia Museum displayed at Lawrence House in Maitland, one at the Nova Scotia Archives and Records Management in Halifax and one by Edouard-Marie Adam at the Musée national de la Marine in Paris, France.

The vessel's achievement is commemorated in Maitland by a National Historic Site monument at the restored home of her builder, Lawrence House, part of the Nova Scotia Museum. Maitland celebrates the launch of William D. Lawrence every September at a weekend festival called "Launch Days".
