= William D. Lawrence Shipyard =

Shipyard in Maitland, Nova Scotia

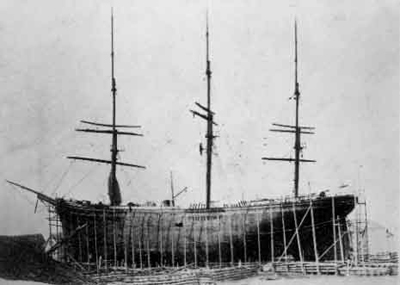
William D. Lawrence Shipyard

The William D. Lawrence Shipyard built vessels from 1859 until 1903 in Maitland, Nova Scotia. It is most renowned for building the William D. Lawrence in 1874, reported to be the largest wooden ship ever built in Canada and one of the largest in the world at the time. The merchant, shipbuilder and politician William Dawson Lawrence established the yard and built six vessels in it. His brothers Lockhart Lawrence and Thomas Lawrence both built vessels in the Shipyard as well as grandson Captain William Lawrence. The output of the Lawrence yard was relatively modest compared to other ship yards of the Bay of Fundy but Lawrence achieved distinction when he decided to build the William D. Lawrence as a tribute to shipbuilding in the province.

Lawrence himself built three ships prior to developing his own shipyard. He drafted plans for the Wanderer that was built at the Chappell Shipyard, Dartmouth, Nova Scotia (1849). He also built the St. Lawrence (1852) and Architect (1853) near his parents home on the Shubenacadie River at the Five Mile River Shipyard.

The Lawrence shipyard was built across the road from William D. Lawrence's house near the mouth of the Shubenacadie River. While it was the most famous shipyard in Maitland, it was just one of many yards in the village, flanked on the south side by the Archibald McCallum Shipyard and to the north by the Sidney Smith shipyard. The site of the shipyard is today a partially eroded beach across the road from the Lawrence House Museum, the former residence of the shipbuilder.

== Sources ==
- Scott, T. (ed.) William D. Lawrence, Nova Scotia shipbuilder & Anti-Confederation Campaigner: The Complete Annotated Writings. Nova Scotia. Heroes of Hants Association. Lulu.com. p. 338
