= William Dawson Lawrence =

Canadian politician

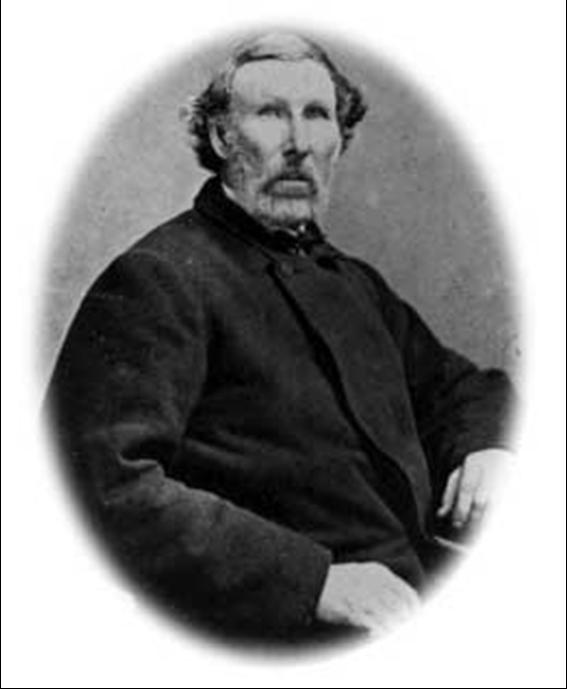
- William D. Lawrence – Nova Scotia House of Assembly (1864)
- Born: 16 July 1817; Lawrencetown, County Down, Northern Ireland
- Died: 8 December 1886 (aged 69); Maitland, Hants County, Nova Scotia
- Resting place: Oak Island Cemetery, Maitland, Hants County, Nova Scotia
- Occupations: Shipbuilder, Businessman, Politician
- Spouse: Mary Hayes
- Parent(s): William Dawson Lawrence and Mary Jane Lockhart

William Dawson Lawrence (16 July 1817 – 8 December 1886) was a successful shipbuilder, businessman and politician. He built the William D. Lawrence, which is reported to be the largest wooden ship ever built in Canada.

In 1874, W.D. Lawrence's great ship was reported to have been the largest wooden sailing ship in the world. The William D. Lawrence represents the pinnacle of W.D.'s career as a marine architect, businessman, and politician. He built the ship in Maitland, Hants County, Nova Scotia. The vessel was 263 feet long.

The renowned historian Frederick William Wallace wrote,

"It was a memorable event in Canadian ship-building annals when his big ship took the water, and had it been elsewhere but in a quiet little Nova Scotia town on the banks of the Shubenacadie River, there would have been a great furor, and Lawrence's genius and skill would have been proclaimed to the four corners of the earth."

== Ship builder ==
Lawrence began his ship building career at the John Chappell shipyard in Dartmouth, Nova Scotia, where he designed his first ship (1849). He also worked at the Alexander Lyle shipyard in Dartmouth. Lawrence also had the opportunity to study in Boston under the great Nova Scotian ship builder Donald McKay.

He returned to Nova Scotia and built two vessels close to his childhood home in Maple Grove, Nova Scotia. Then Lawrence built six more vessels in the William D. Lawrence Shipyard opposite his home in Maitland, Hants County, Nova Scotia. Lawrence was very successful in business.

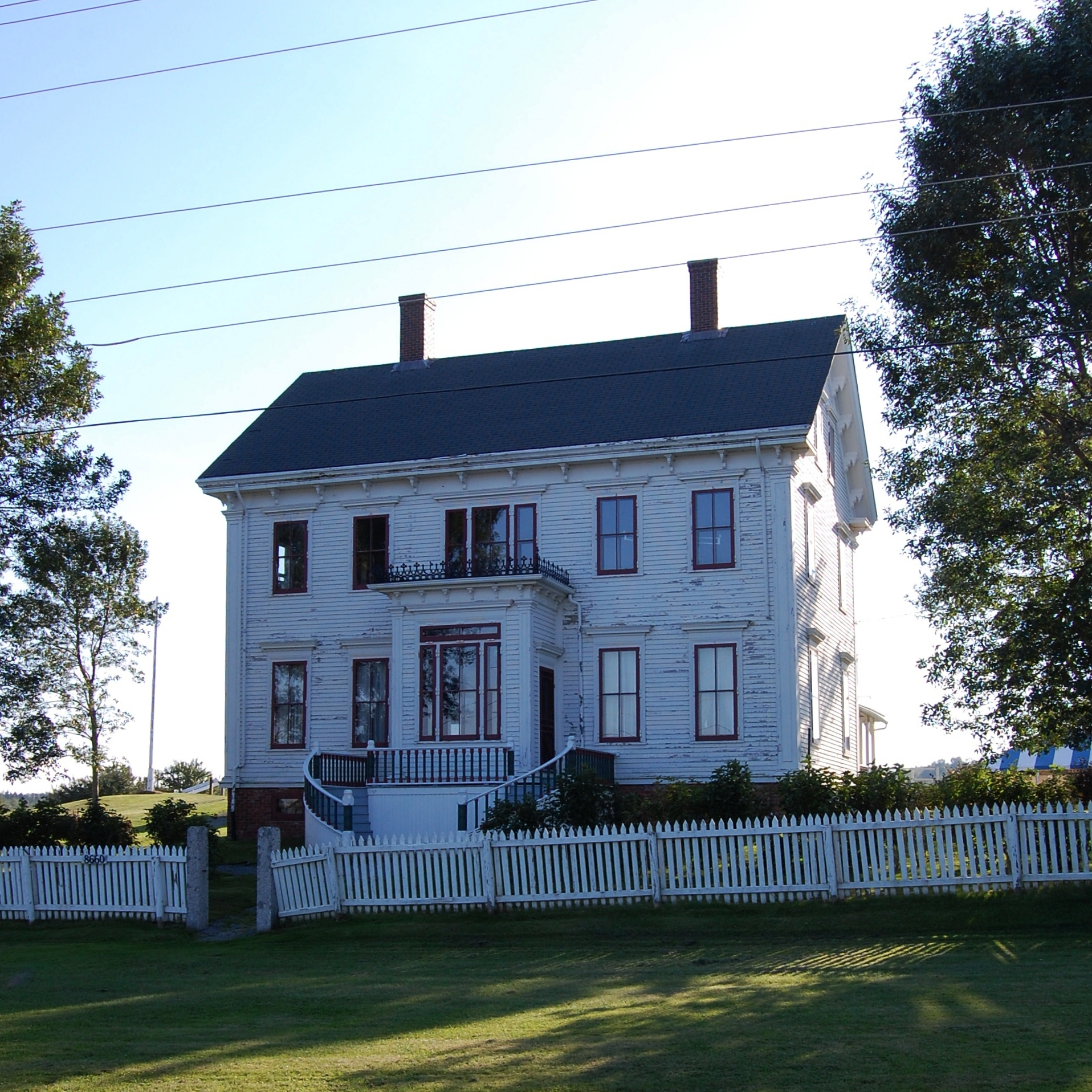
Lawrence House, Maitland - member of the Nova Scotia Museum

The three-year maiden voyage of the William D. Lawrence involved Lawrence being towed from Maitland to Saint John, New Brunswick. Upon the ship being fitted, Lawrence then traveled to Liverpool, England; Aden, British India (present day Yemen);

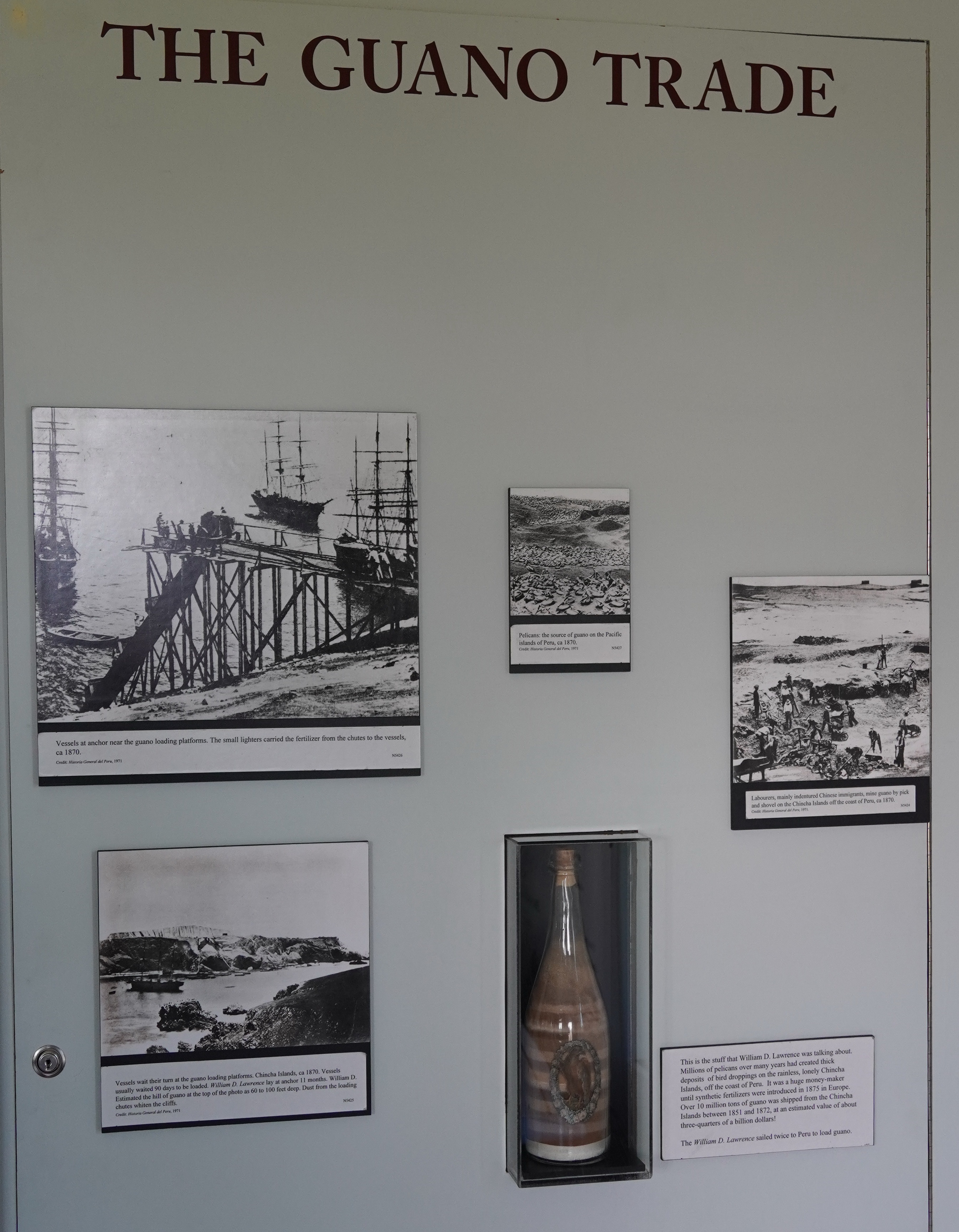
Guano Information on the wall of the William D. Lawrence Museum, Nova Scotia, Canada (2023-08-17)

Peru: photo: Guano Information on the wall of the William D. Lawrence Museum, Nova Scotia, Canada. 2023-08-17. "1870 Pelicans Guano (excrement) from the Chincha Islands, off the coast of Peru was valuable as a natural fertilizer for the farmers. The ship sailed twice to this destination. His ship lay at anchor for 11 months in one trip were there were diplomatic problems." Le Havre, France; St. John's, Newfoundland, and then returned home.

During his voyage he recorded the life of sailors at sea and in port. While at sea, Lawrence records events such as catching a shark. In terms of a sailors life in port, he recorded a significant amount of their lives being intimately linked with sex trade workers. Lawrence makes significant observations about the plight of women around the world.

Lawrence built eight vessels which were very profitable for him. The two last vessels he built, the Pegusus (1867) and the William D. Lawrence (1874) were the most profitable. From the first four years at sea, W.D. earned from the Pegusus a profit of $1.4 million. From the first three years at sea, W.D. earned from the William D. Lawrence a profit of $1 million. After profiting from the vessel for five more years, W.D. sold the William D. Lawrence for $2.4 million. (big profit)

== Politician ==
William D. Lawrence was elected to the 23rd General Assembly of Nova Scotia in 1863. He represented Hants County, Nova Scotia – North. He was elected on a platform that gave the right for every Nova Scotian to vote, not just property owners. Lawrence was also a great supporter of public education and saw it as a foundation for a healthy democracy. He joined Joseph Howe and the Anti-Confederation Party in fighting Charles Tupper's campaign to have Nova Scotia join Confederation. While confederation was passed on July 1, 1867, Lawrence, along with most other "Anti-Confederate" campaigners, was successful in the election of September 1867 in defeating the pro-Confederates. Joseph Howe also won his election as the federal representative for Hants County. Eventually, Joseph Howe left the Anti-Confederation campaign and ran successfully in a by-election in Hants (1869). The following provincial election, Lawrence continued to support the Anti-Confederation campaign and lost the election (1871). Lawrence retired for seven years from politics to build the William D. Lawrence. He tried again to run for the nomination of the liberal party but was defeated (1878).

== Writer ==
Along with writing about the maiden voyage of the William D. Lawrence, he also published articles in the provincial papers on the opposition he experienced in building the ship, capitalism and labour, and his trips to Bermuda in the winter months. In Lawrence's unpublished manuscript he also writes extensively about prostitution; differences among races of people; the supremacy of Christianity; the triumph of democracy over tyranny; and the success of capitalism. Lawrence's ideas about prostitution were largely influenced by Dr. William Sanger, one of the foremost researchers on prostitution during the Victorian Age. Lawrence's travel writings noted that he visited his birthplace of Lawrencetown, County Down, Ireland, and that he heard a sermon given by the famous Charles Haddon Spurgeon. He also wrote about being mortified by a bullfight that he saw in Peru and enjoying the Masquerade ball he attended while in Paris.

Lawrence died in Maitland, Hants County, Nova Scotia, at the age of 69.

== Commemorations ==
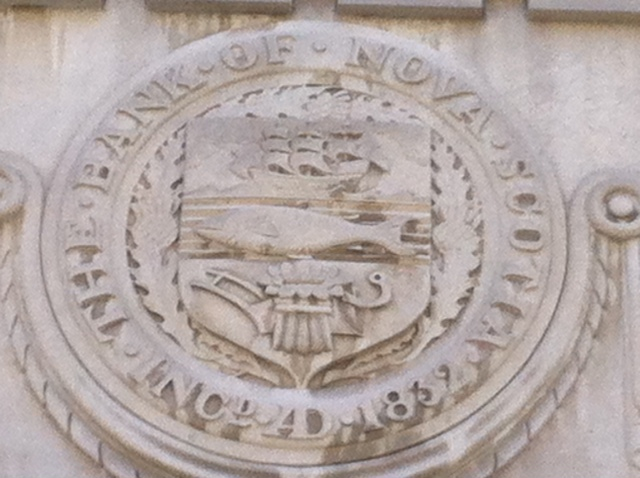
William D. Lawrence (ship) carved into the Bank of Nova Scotia Building, Hollis Street, Halifax, Nova Scotia

In 1930, William D. Lawrence and his great ship were commemorated by the Bank of Nova Scotia, which placed a stone carving of the ship above the door of the head office building in Halifax, Nova Scotia (located on Hollis Street, directly across from Province House (Nova Scotia)). A monument dedicated to Lawrence's ship as a national historic treasure was erected on the grounds of his home (1967) and his home became a provincial museum site opening to the public on August 11, 1971. The ship has also been commemorated by the Canada Post with a postage stamp (1975) and the Royal Canadian Mint with a coin (2002). There are numerous ship portraits of the vessel. One portrait by E. Petit hangs in Government House (Nova Scotia). The most famous portrait is by Edouard-Marie Adam and belongs to the Musée national de la Marine, Paris, France.
