= Shubenacadie 13 =

Coordinates: 44.934°N 63.607°W

Location of Shubenacadie 13 in Nova Scotia

Shubenacadie 13 is a Mi'kmaq reserve located in Halifax County, Nova Scotia.

It is administratively part of the Shubenacadie First Nation. Michael Francklin established the reserve in 1779.
