= Maitland, Nova Scotia =

Community in Nova Scotia, Canada

Maitland
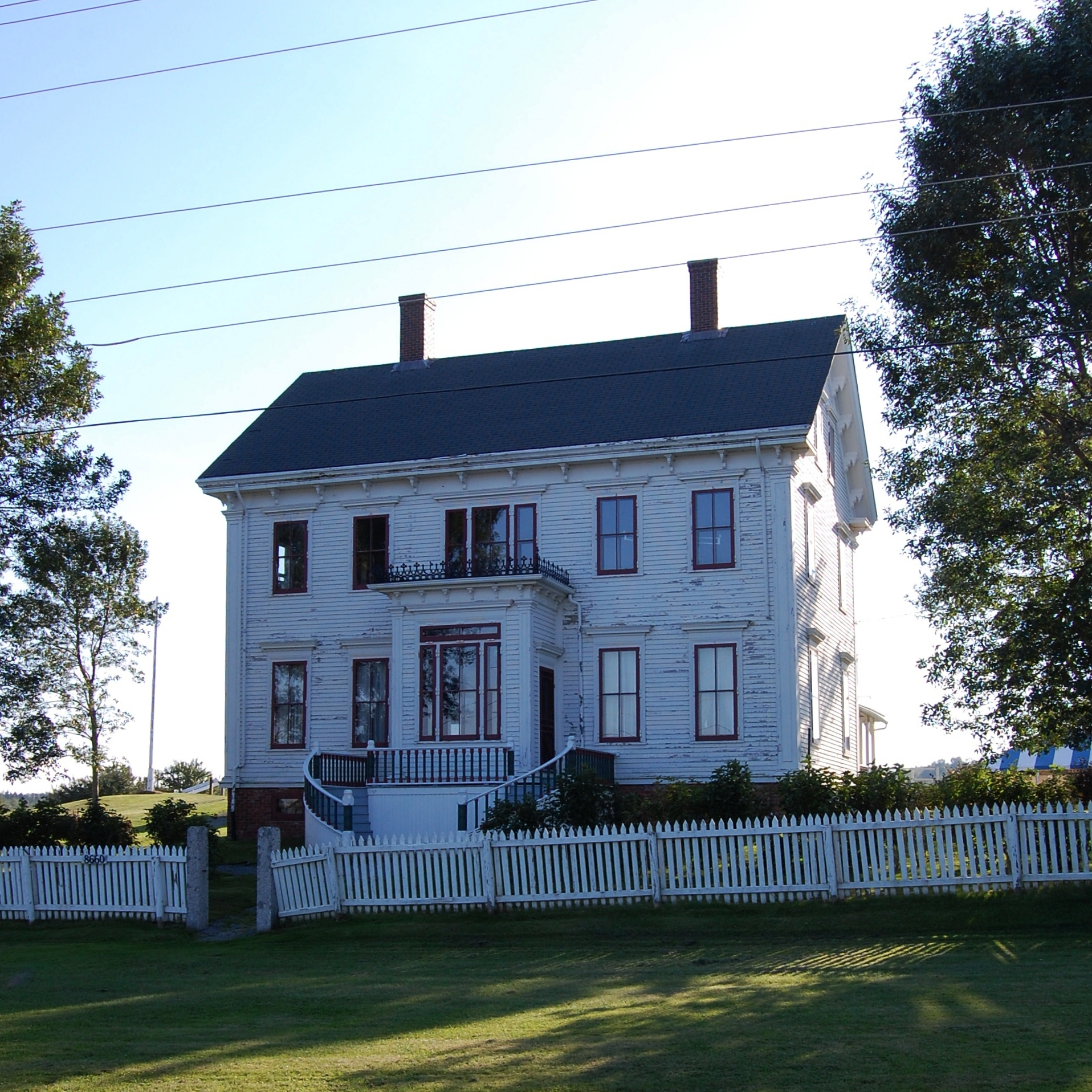
- Lawrence House Museum in Maitland

- Location in Nova Scotia
- Coordinates: 45°19′4.57″N 63°29′51.46″W
- Country: Canada
- Province: Nova Scotia
- Municipality: East Hants
- Time zone: UTC-4 (AST)
  - Summer (DST): UTC-3 (ADT)
- Canadian Postal code: B0N
- Area code: 902
- Telephone exchange: 261

Maitland (originally known as Jean Peter's Village) is an unincorporated community in the Canadian province of Nova Scotia, located in the Municipal District of East Hants. It is home to the Lawrence House Museum, part of the Nova Scotia Museum. The William D. Lawrence ship was built in Maitland. The community was part of the Douglas Township until it was renamed Maitland after former Lieutenant Governor of Nova Scotia Peregrine Maitland (1828–34) when the building of the Shubenacadie Canal was first attempted (1826–1831). The Canal was intended to start at Maitland and run through the province to Maitland Street, Dartmouth, with the canal being "bookended" by two "Maitland landmarks."

== History ==
=== 1700s ===
Beginning in 1699, the Mi'kmaq people living in Peninsular Nova Scotia were forcefully relocated from their homes into the settlement known today as Sipekne'katik First Nation, near Shubenacadie. Maitland was settled by the Acadians in 1685 and occupied until 1755.

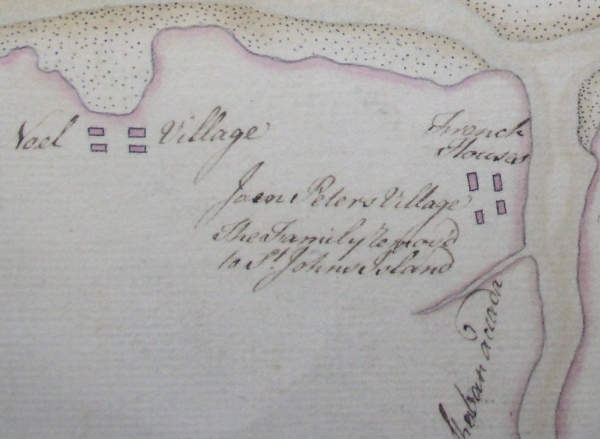
Charles Morris Map of Maitland, 1752 (inset)

Maitland was settled by Jean Denis Pitre (i.e., Peters), son of Jean Denis Pitre, prior to the Acadian Expulsion. Several of Pitre's children married the children of Noel Doiron and Robert Henry from the neighboring communities of Vil Noel (Noel, Nova Scotia) and Vil Robere respectively. In 1750 the Acadians at Maitland joined the Acadian Exodus during Father Le Loutre's War and moved to Riviere Nord-Est, Ile St. Jean (present-day Hillsborough River (Prince Edward Island)). The former inhabitants of Maitland died in 1758 during the Expulsion of the Acadians in the sinking of the Duke William

After the expulsion of the Acadians from Maitland (1750), the land was owned but never settled by Malachy Salter. Decades after the village was vacated by the Acadians, it was settled by Ulster Scots people such as the Putnams (c. 1771).

=== Shipbuilding ===
Maitland emerged as a major shipbuilding centre in the late 19th century. William Dawson Lawrence became the community's most famous shipbuilder. His ship, the William D. Lawrence, the largest wooden ship ever built in Canada and third largest in the world, was launched at the William D. Lawrence Shipyard in Maitland on October 27, 1874, to one of the largest crowds assembled in Nova Scotia to that date. Every September, Maitland celebrates the launch of William D. Lawrence at a weekend festival called "Launch Days". Several other shipyards built large vessels as well, including the barque Calburga, the last large square rigger to sail under the Canadian flag. Today, the only remaining remnant of the shipbuilding industry is Frieze and Roy, a general store which has operated since the 1860s and is known as Canada's oldest general store.

=== RCAF Aerodrome Maitland ===
During World War II, the RCAF constructed an aerodrome near the community of Maitland. The Aerodrome acted as a relief landing field for CFS Debert that was located nearby. In approximately 1942, the aerodrome was listed at 45°20′N 63°32′W with a Var. 23.5 degrees W and no elevation specified. The field was listed as "Hard under construction" and had one runway listed as follows:

Runway Name	Length	Width	Surface
3/21	4,000 feet (1,219 m)	200 feet (61 m)	Hard

== Architecture ==
Maitland was Nova Scotia's first Heritage Conservation District. The center of the community is a Heritage Conservation District because of its many fine and well-preserved examples of Victorian architecture. The styles of architecture include Gothic, Federal, Colonial, Cape Cod (house), Greek Revival architecture, Second Empire (architecture) and Italianate, of which style the Lawrence House shows many fine details.

== Notable residents ==
- William Dawson Lawrence, ship builder
- Willard Miller, Spanish–American War hero; recipient of the Medal of Honor

== Film ==
The story for the television drama "The Night They Killed Joe Howe" (1960) (TV drama), starring Douglas Rain, Austin Willis and Star Trek's James Doohan, was located in Maitland, Nova Scotia (Film Review)
