= Battle of Cienfuegos =

Engagement of the Spanish–American War

Coordinates: 22.1456°N 80.4364°W

- Part of the Spanish–American War
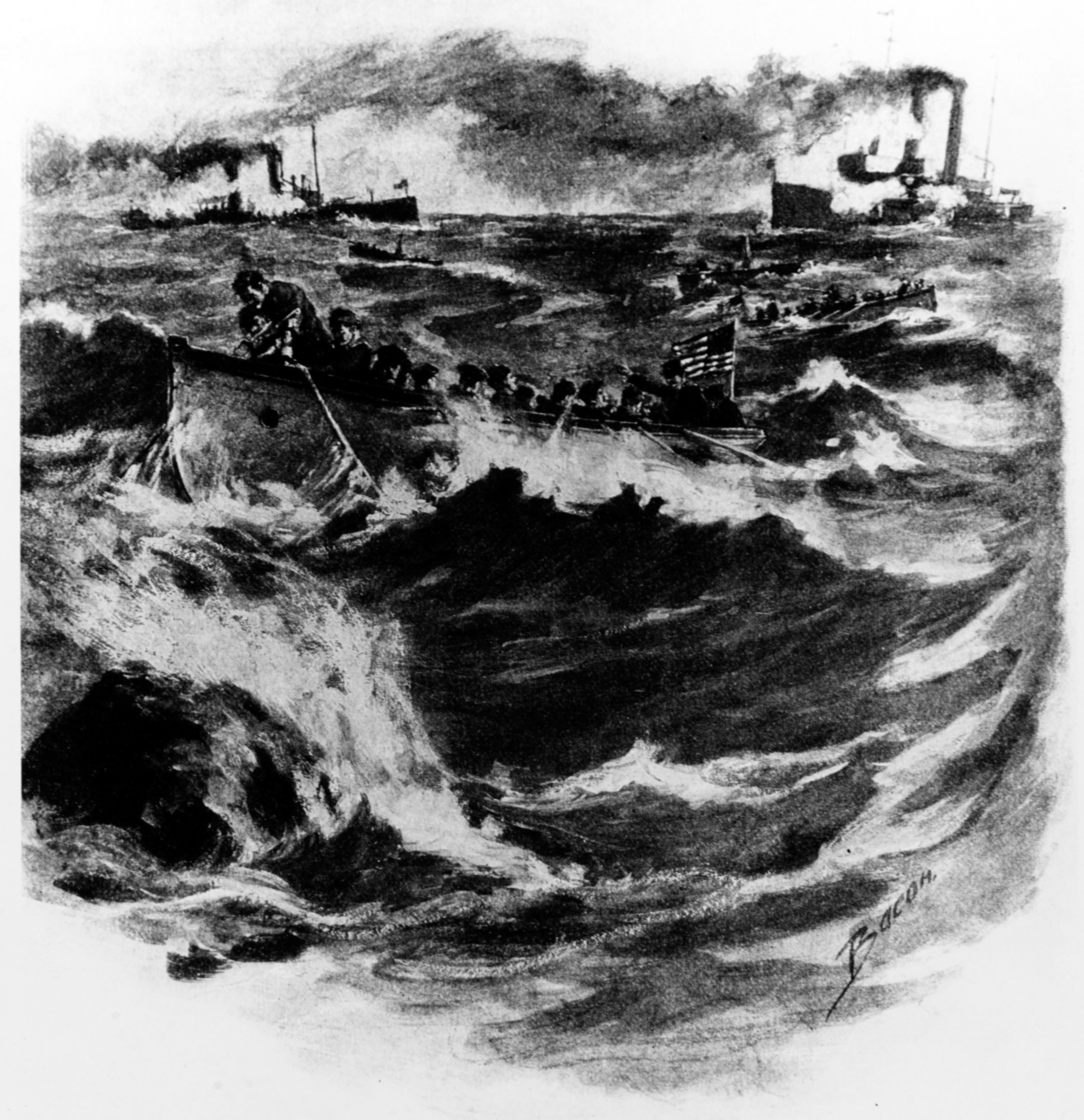
- The cable-cutting expedition at Cienfuegos, Bacon
Date	May 11, 1898
Location	Off Cienfuegos, Caribbean Sea
Result	Spanish victory

Belligerents
Spain	United States

Commanders and leaders
Francisco Cróquer	Bowman McCalla; Cameron Winslow

Strength
Unknown	1 unprotected cruiser 1 gunboat 1 revenue cutter 2 steam launches

Casualties and losses
None	2 killed 15 wounded

The Battle of Cienfuegos, also known as the Raid on Cienfuegos, was an engagement of the Spanish–American War, intended by the United States Navy to tighten its blockade of Cuba.

== Background ==
The Spanish were using undersea cables as a means to communicate with not only the rest of Cuba, but also the Spanish command. These cables had many key junctions, namely, a shore near Cienfuegos. The cables connected to Havana, the port of Santiago, and then branched off to other Caribbean islands such as Jamaica. The cables were run out from an easily located house which contained a critical hub for the undersea cable system. While the house could easily be destroyed, this would only inflict largely superficial damage, and could easily be repaired and functioning in a short period of time. Therefore, command decided to grapple the three cables out of the sea and cut them in several places, disrupting much of the communications between the Spanish and their operations in Cuba. This damage would be much more difficult to repair, as the cables were nearing two inches in diameter which made cutting, and by extension repairing them, a difficult task. For the mission, the cruiser USS Marblehead, the gunboat USS Nashville, and the revenue cutter USS Windom were dispatched under the command of Captain Bowman H. McCalla to sever them.

== Battle ==
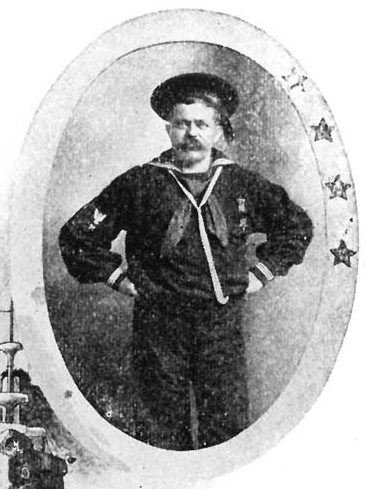
Carpenter's Mate 3/class William Meyer awarded Medal of Honor

The Marblehead and Nashville both opened fire on the cable house at 6:45 a.m. on May 11, 1898. Rather quickly, the cable house collapsed from the fire from the two warships. Ten minutes later, at 6:55 a.m. the warships dispatched their work boats, each carrying a minimal crew of sixteen, in order to minimize the risk of casualty. The element of surprise was quickly lost, as a Spanish Cavalryman spotted the ships en route to the beach.

While the first cable was out of the line of fire, the second cable was not so easy to cut. Because of coral formation, the cable was very difficult to snare in order to bring it up to the surface and cut. The Spanish forces were also much closer to the second cable, so the crew had to contend with both of these problems. In order to suppress the increased fire from the Spanish forces, both warships increased their bombardment. As the raid crew hauled up the second cable to cut it, they discovered a third, smaller cable. After the second had been cut, they moved on to find this third and final cable. They were not able to however, as a large contingent of Spanish forces arrived from Cienfuegos to repel what they thought at the time was a full-scale invasion. By 11:15 a.m. the raid was over.

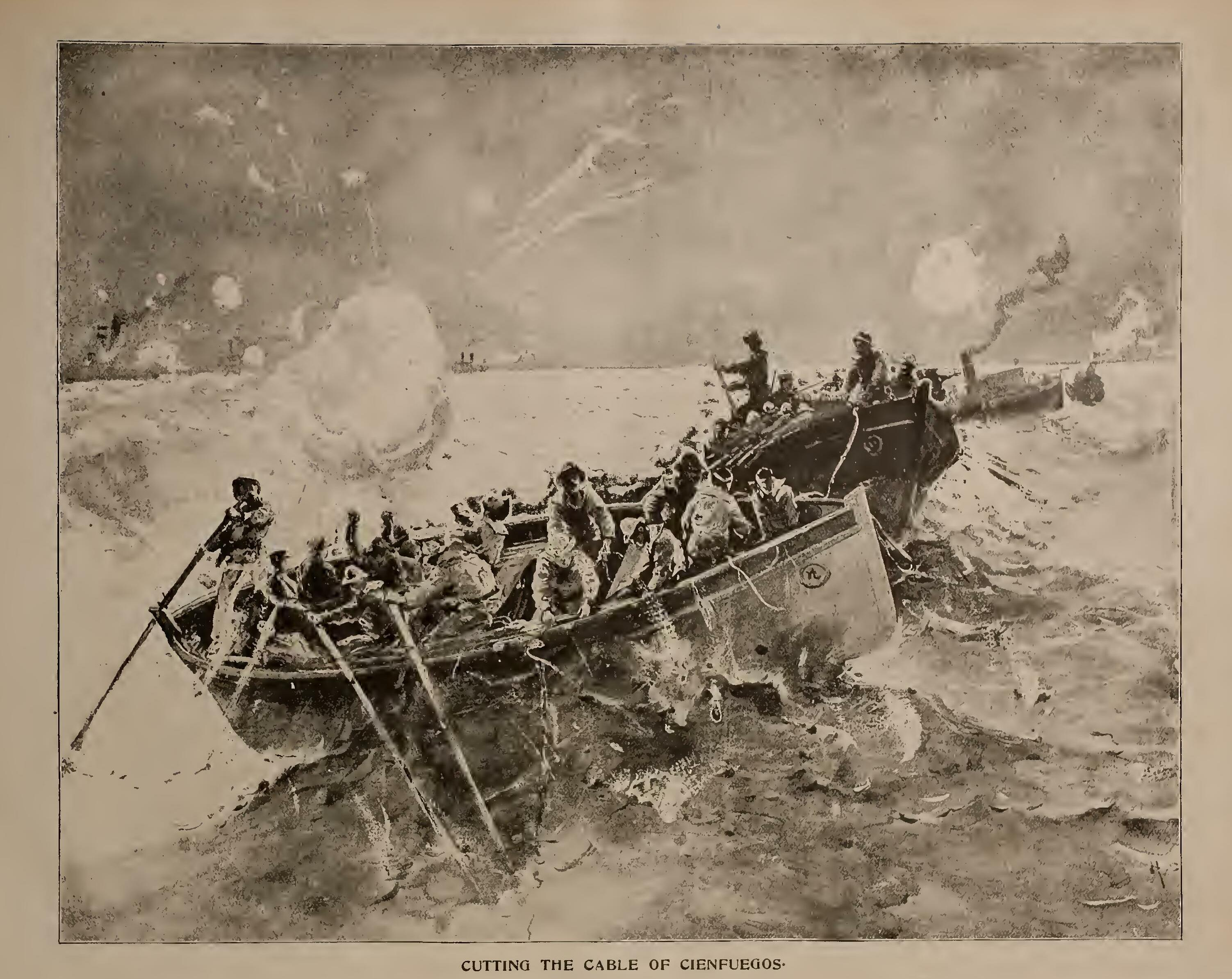
Cutting the Cable of Cienfuegos illustration

After a tense, hour-long firefight, two cables were cut, and the sailors and Marines withdrew, but a third cable near the shore remained untouched.

== Aftermath ==
Fifty-two US sailors and marines were awarded the Medal of Honor for "setting an example of extraordinary bravery and coolness under fire."
