= USS Nashville (PG-7) =

US Navy gunboat (commissioned 1897–1918)

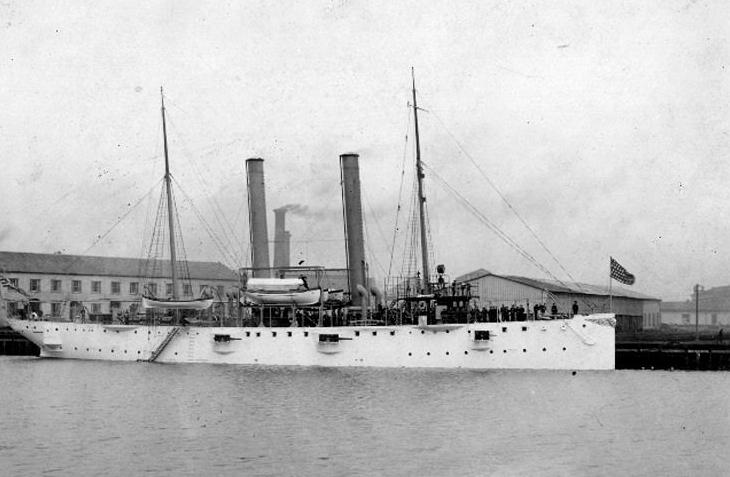
- USS Nashville at the Norfolk Navy Yard, Virginia, 8 January 1898.

History

United States
- Name: USS Nashville
- Namesake: Nashville, Tennessee
- Builder: Newport News Shipbuilding and Drydock Company, Newport News, Virginia
- Laid down: 9 August 1894
- Launched: 19 October 1895
- Commissioned: 19 August 1897
- Decommissioned: 21 October 1918
- Fate: Sold, 20 October 1921

General characteristics
- Type: Gunboat
- Displacement: 1,371 long tons (1,393 t)
- Length: 233 ft 8 in (71.22 m)
- Beam: 38 ft 1 in (11.61 m)
- Draft: 11 ft (3.4 m)
- Installed power: 2,500 ihp (1,860 kW)
- Propulsion: Screw steamer
- Speed: 16.3 kn (30.2 km/h; 18.8 mph)
- Complement: 180 officers and enlisted
- Armament: 8 × 4 in (100 mm) guns; 2 × 6–pounder guns; 2 × 3–pounder guns; 2 × 1–pounder guns

Service record
- Operations: Spanish–American War; Philippine–American War; Boxer Rebellion; Mexican Expedition; World War I

USS Nashville (PG-7), a gunboat, was the only ship of its class. It was the first of three ships of the United States Navy to hold the name Nashville.

== Construction and commissioning ==
Nashville (PG-7) was laid down on 9 August 1894 by Newport News Shipbuilding and Drydock Company at Newport News, Virginia. She was launched on 19 October 1895, sponsored by Miss Emma Thompson, and commissioned on 19 August 1897.

== Service history ==
=== Pre-commissioning ===
The contract to build Nashville was awarded on Jan. 22, 1894, the first Navy construction contract won by the Newport News Shipbuilding and Drydock Company.

The ship's originally planned sponsor was Miss Maria Guild, daughter of Nashville, Tennessee Mayor George Blackmore Guild. While Mayor Guild's party was en route to the christening ceremony, word was received that William Guild, Mayor Guild's son, was accidentally shot and killed. The party turned back immediately. Miss Emma Thompson, also from Nashville, christened the ship, with Joseph E. Washington standing in for Mayor Guild.

=== Spanish–American War ===
Upon commissioning, Nashville joined the North Atlantic Fleet. As the Spanish–American War became imminent after the sinking of the armored cruiser Maine, she was ordered to the Caribbean. She was credited with firing the first shot of the war when, upon sighting Buena Ventura, she fired a blank shot across the Spanish merchant ship's bow. She captured four Spanish vessels between 22 April and 26 July 1898, and assisted in cutting the undersea telegraph cable just off Cienfuegos, Cuba where many of her sailors and Marines were honored with Medals of Honor for their actions during the Battle of Cienfuegos. Nashville remained on duty off Cuba until the war's end in August 1898.

=== Pre-World War I ===
The gunboat departed the Caribbean for duty in the Philippines on 14 October 1899, arriving at Manila on 31 December via the Suez Canal. Nashville provided gunfire support for American troops in campaigns against Filipino insurgents until June 1900. When the Boxer Rebellion erupted in China, Nashville departed Cavite on 8 June for China with a Marine Detachment embarked. She arrived at Taku on 18 June, disembarked the Marines assigned to the International Relief Expedition, and remained until the allied forces lifted the siege of Peking. After patrol duty off China, Nashville arrived at Cavite on 3 February 1901, where she based until July.

Transferred to the Mediterranean, the gunboat arrived at Genoa, Italy on 22 September. After a year's patrol duty, Nashville left Gibraltar on 1 November 1902, arriving at Boston, Massachusetts on 16 January 1903. On the Caribbean Station from 26 May 1903 – 4 March 1904, the Nashville was instrumental in preventing Colombian troops in Colón using the Panama railway thereby ensuring the success of the revolutionary junta in Panama and securing a treaty with the United States in building the Panama Canal. She returned to Boston on 18 June and decommissioned on 30 June.

Recommissioned on 8 August 1905 at Boston Navy Yard, Nashville sailed on 8 September for Santo Domingo, operating off Cuba, Puerto Rico, and Santo Domingo until 26 June 1906, when she returned to Boston to decommission on 23 July.

After three years in reserve, Nashville was assigned to the Illinois Naval Militia on 29 April 1909. From May 1909 – July 1911, she trained militiamen on the Great Lakes, homeported at Chicago.

USS Nashville caused an incident in 1909 when she was sent to the Great Lakes through the Canadian canal system unarmed. She was then later armed, along with four other ships, in contravention of the Rush–Bagot Treaty of 1817.

After extensive overhaul and sea trials, she departed Boston on 7 January 1912, arriving Santo Domingo on 31 January to begin five years of patrol operations in the West Indies and off Central America, protecting United States interests. The ship participated in the United States occupation of Veracruz, proclaimed in April 1914 by United States President Woodrow Wilson, against the Mexican government of Victoriano Huerta. After a short period of reduced commission status from 10 May-8 July 1916 in New Orleans, the gunboat returned to Tampico, Mexico, where she remained until the U.S. entered World War I on 6 April 1917.

=== World War I ===
After temporary duty off Tampico, Nashville sailed from Norfolk, Virginia on 2 August 1917, arriving Gibraltar on 18 August to patrol off the Moroccan coast. After serving as convoy escort off North Africa and in the western Mediterranean until 15 July 1918, Nashville departed Gibraltar, arriving on 1 August at Charleston, South Carolina.

=== Fate ===
Nashville decommissioned on 21 October 1918 at Charleston, South Carolina, and was sold on 20 October 1921 to J. L. Bernard and Company, Washington, D.C.
