= Sipekne'katik First Nation =

First Nation in Nova Scotia, Canada

- Band No. 25
- People: Mi'kmaq
- Headquarters: 522 Church Street, Indian Brook
- Province: Nova Scotia

Land
- Main reserve: Indian Brook 14
- Reserves: New Ross 20; Pennal 19; Shubenacadie 13; Wallace Hills 14A
- Land area: 21.537 km^{2} (8.315 sq mi)

Population (June 2025)
- On reserve: 1375
- On other land: 82
- Off reserve: 1642
- Total population: 3099

Government
- Chief: Michelle Glasgow
- Council: Jerry Augustine; Rufus Copage; Logan Gehue; Thomas J. Howe; Justin Johnson; Keith Julian; Brian Knockwood; Lena Knockwood; Ron Knockwood; Brandon Maloney; De-Anne Sack; Brooke Willis

Tribal Council
- Confederacy of Mainland Mi'kmaq

Website
- https://www.sipeknekatik.ca/

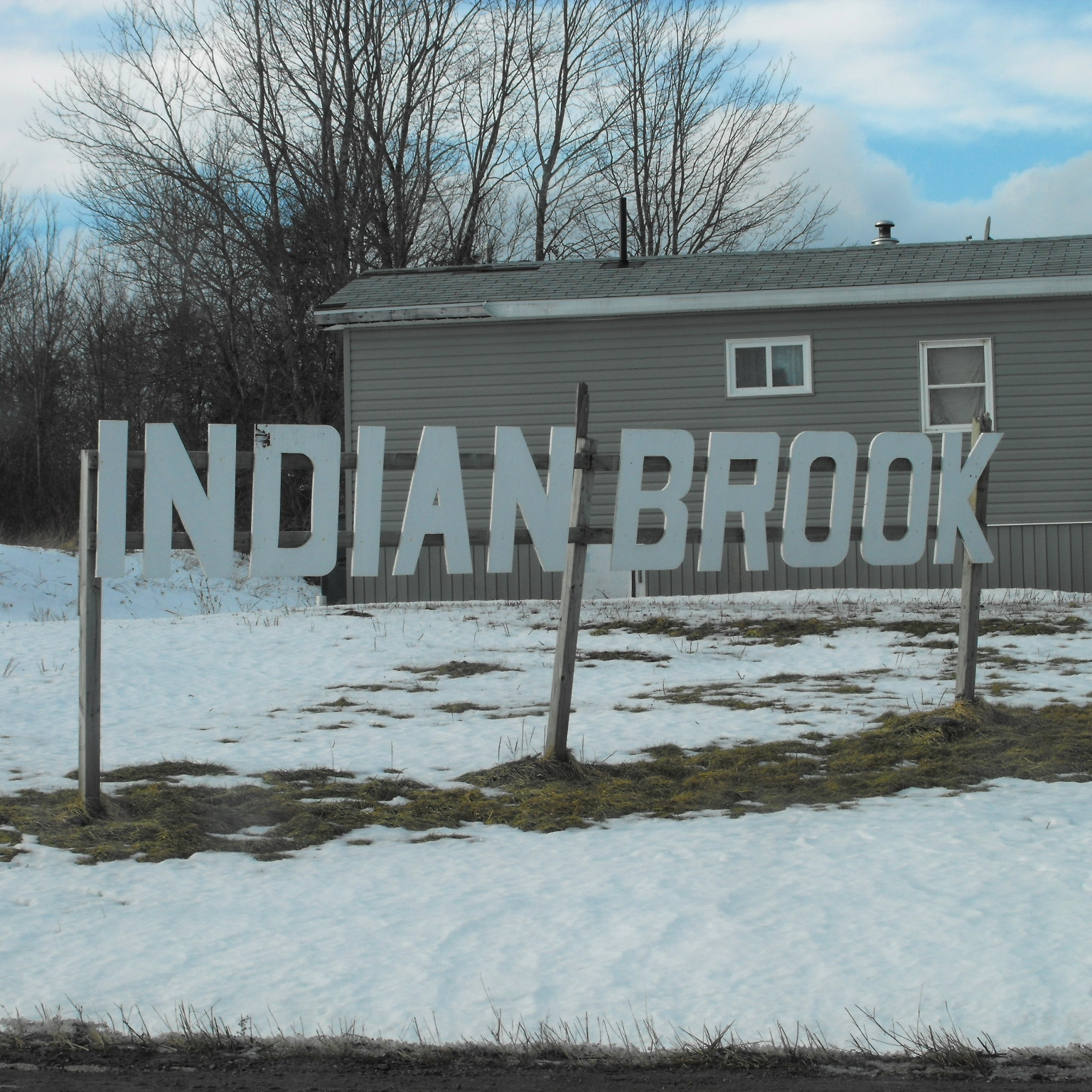
Indian Brook 14, Nova Scotia, Nova Scotia

The Sipekne'katik First Nation is composed of four Mi'kmaq First Nation reserves located in central Nova Scotia. As of 2012, the Mi'kmaq population is 1,195 on-Reserve, and approximately 1,190 off-Reserve. The First Nation includes Indian Brook 14, Nova Scotia, near Shubenacadie, Nova Scotia. The band was known as the Shubenacadie First Nation until 2014 when the traditional spelling and pronunciation of its name was officially adopted.

== Name ==
The Mi'kmaq term Sipekne’katik translates as "where the wild potatoes grow".

== History ==
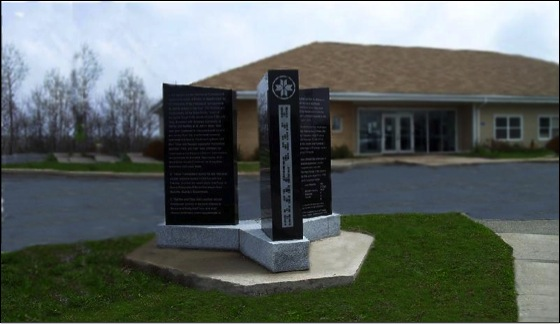
Monument to the Treaty of 1752, Indian Brook 14, Nova Scotia

Father Louis-Pierre Thury sought to gather the Mi'kmaq of the Nova Scotia peninsula into a single settlement around Shubenacadie as early as 1699. Not until Dummer's War, however, did Antoine Gaulin, a Quebec-born missionary, erect a permanent mission at Shubenacadie (adjacent to Snides Lake and close to the former Residential school). He also made seasonal trips to Cape Sable, LaHave, and Mirlegueche.

The Shubenacadie mission's dedication to Saint Anne speaks to a spirit of accommodation on the part of both the French and the Mi'kmaq. Anne, traditionally identified as the mother of Mary, was the grandmother of Jesus himself. The esteemed position of grandmothers in Mi'kmaq society was a point of agreement between Roman Catholicism and the Mi'kmaq worldview, and highlights the complexity and contingency of the 'conversion' process.

In 1738, Father Jean-Louis Le Loutre arrived in October of that year at Mission Sainte-Anne, having spent the previous winter in Cape Breton learning the Mi'kmaq language with Abbé Pierre Maillard. During Father Rale's War and King George's War, Mission Sainte-Anne was a sort of military base along with being a place of worship. Coulon de Villiers' hardy troop passed this way on their brutal mid-winter march toward the Battle of Grand Pré in 1747, and Mi'kmaq warriors used the site as a staging point for their attacks on Halifax and Dartmouth during Father Le Loutre's War. During Father Le Loutre's War, Captain Matthew Floyer arrived at the Mission on August 18, 1754 and recorded:

Half after Twelve we came to the Masshouse, which I think is the neatest in the Country, 'tis Adorned with a Fine lofty Steeple and a Weather Cock. The Parsonage House is the only Habitation here, the land is good & seems to be more so on the opposite side.

Floyer's map, which accompanied his written report, suggests the presence of three structures at the mission site.

Twelve months later, the Expulsion of the Acadians began during the French and Indian War and by October 1755, Mission Sainte-Anne appears to have been destroyed. Oral tradition says the Mi'kmaq destroyed the mission to prevent it from falling into the New Englanders possession and dumped it into Snides Lake, which was adjacent to the mission.

The reserve was established by Governor Michael Francklin in 1779.

Members of the community are involved in an ongoing dispute over a self-regulated indigenous fishery.

== Notable residents and members ==
- Daniel N. Paul — Mi'kmaq elder, author, activist
- Jean-Baptiste Cope — leader of Mi'kmaq militia
- Jean-Louis Le Loutre — Catholic priest, missionary, and military leader
- Cathy Elliott — actor, writer, and teacher
- Lilly & Jack Sullivan – siblings who disappeared mysteriously in 2025

== Composition ==
Sipekne'katik is composed of five parts as shown:

Community	Area	Location	Population	Date established
Indian Brook 14	1,234.2 hectares (3,050 acres)	28.8 km (18 miles) southwest of Truro	1,084	July 8, 1820
New Ross 20	408.3 hectares (1,009 acres)	64 km (39¾ miles) northwest of Halifax	0	March 3, 1820
Pennal 19	43.5 hectares (107 acres)	67.2 km (41¾ miles) northwest of Halifax	22	March 3, 1754
Shubenacadie 13	412 hectares (1,020 acres)	32 km (20 miles) north of Halifax	0	March 3, 1999
Wallace Hills 14A	54.8 hectares (135 acres)	19 km (11¾ miles) northwest of Halifax	10	March 10, 2011

== See also ==
- List of Indian Reserves in Nova Scotia
- List of Indian Reserves in Canada
