= 84th Regiment of Foot (Royal Highland Emigrants) =

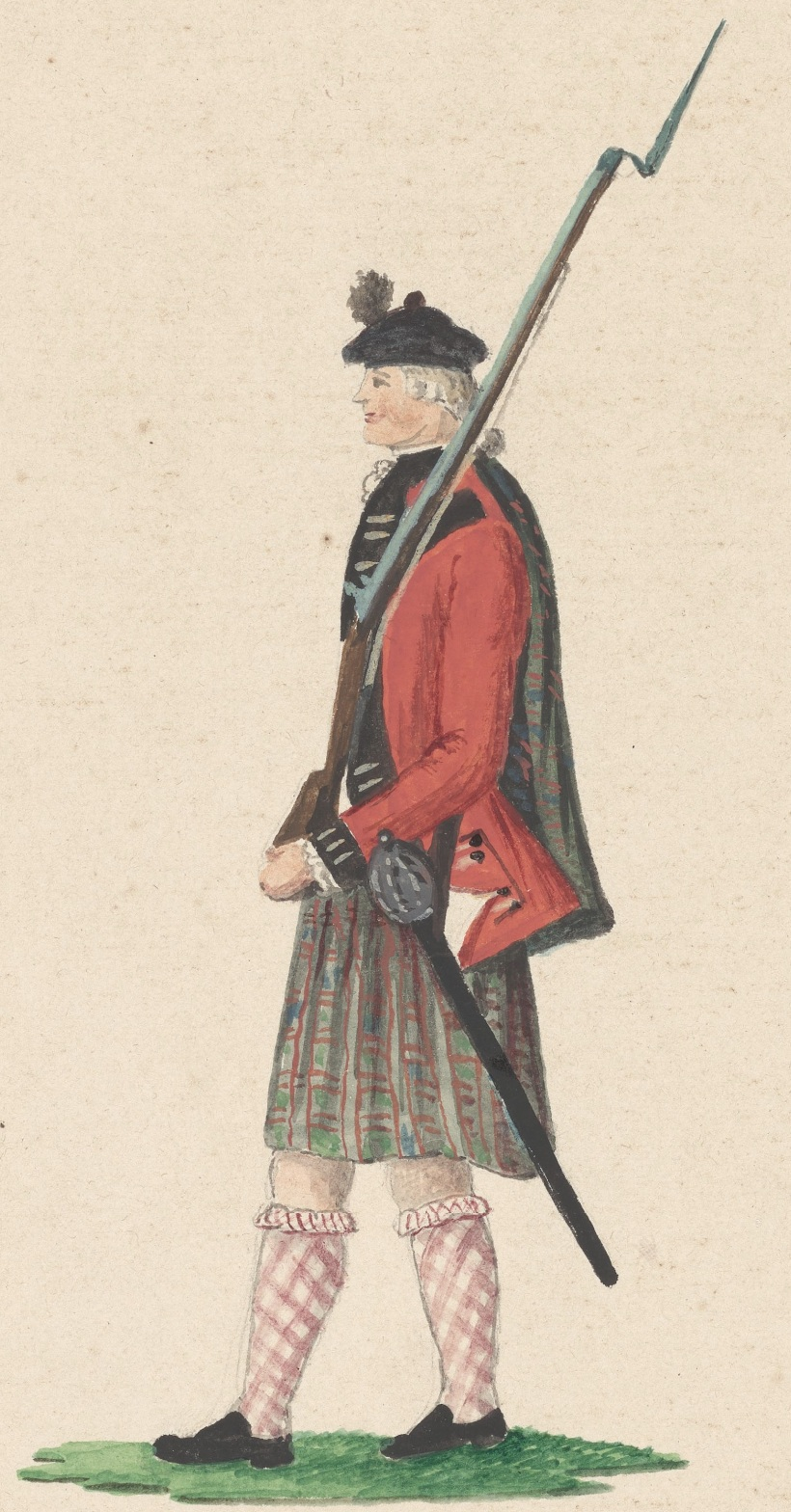
- A regimental private in 1778
- Active: 1775–1784
- Allegiance: Great Britain
- Branch: British Army
- Type: Infantry
- Role: Line infantry
- Size: 2 battalions
- Garrison/HQ: Fort Edward, Province of New York
- Nicknames: Royal Highland Emigrants (1st Battalion), Young Highlanders (2nd Battalion)
- Motto: Quicquid aut facere aut pati (Whatever either is to be done or endured)
- Colors: dark blue facings; the buttonhole lace was white, with red outer/blue middle/red inner worms; the colours were made up when the regiment was intended to be designated "77th Foot" and bore that number
- Engagements: American Revolutionary War First Battalion: Fort St. John's, Quebec (1775); Quebec City, Quebec (1775); Moore's Creek Bridge, North Carolina (1776); Upper New York Raid (1777), Raid on Lake Champlain (1778), Raids on Mohawk Valley, New York (1780, 1781, 1782); Second Battalion: Siege of Boston, Massachusetts (1775); Charleston, South Carolina (1776); Long Island, New York (1776); Newcastle Jane, Nfld (1776); Newport, Rhode Island (1776); Fort Howe, Saint John, New Brunswick (1777); Penobscot River, Maine (1778); Cape Sable, Nova Scotia (1778); Penobscot River, Maine (1779); Bay of Fundy, (1779); Raids on Mohawk Valley, New York (1780); Hampton Roads, Virginia (1780); Charlestown, South Carolina (1780–84); Tompkins' Bridges, Virginia (1781); Fort Motte, South Carolina (1781); Eutaw Springs, South Carolina (1781); Wiggin's Hill, Georgia (1781); Fair Lawn, South Carolina (1781); Wimboo Swamp, North Carolina (1781); Combahee River, South Carolina (1782)

Commanders
- First Colonel of the Regiment: Lieutenant General Sir Henry Clinton
- Second (and final) Colonel of the Regiment: General Sir Guy Carleton
- Notable commanders: Allan Maclean (1st Battalion) John Small (2nd Battalion)

The 84th Regiment of Foot (Royal Highland Emigrants) was a British regiment in the American Revolutionary War that was raised to defend present-day Ontario, Quebec, and Atlantic Canada from the constant land and sea attacks by American Revolutionaries. The 84th Regiment was also involved in offensive action in the Thirteen Colonies, including North Carolina, South Carolina, Georgia, Virginia, and what is now Maine, as well as raids upon Lake Champlain and the Mohawk Valley. The regiment consisted of 2,000 men in twenty companies. The 84th Regiment was raised from Scottish soldiers who had served in the Seven Years' War and stayed in North America. As a result, the 84th Regiment had one of the oldest and most experienced officer corps of any regiment in North America. The Scottish Highland regiments were a key element of the British Army in the American Revolution.

The 84th Regiment was clothed, armed, and accoutred the same as the Black Watch, with Lieutenant Colonel Allan Maclean commanding the first battalion and Major General John Small of Strathardle commanding the second. The two Battalions operated independently of each other and saw little action together.

== First Battalion ==
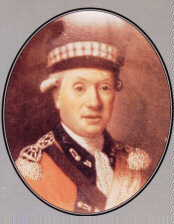
Lt Colonel Allan Maclean, Commander, 1st Battalion

=== Historical context - Quebec and Ontario ===
The British Province of Quebec (which included much of the present-day provinces of Quebec and Ontario) was the target of an invasion by Continental Army forces in 1775.

=== Lieutenant Colonel Allan Maclean, Commander, 1st Battalion ===
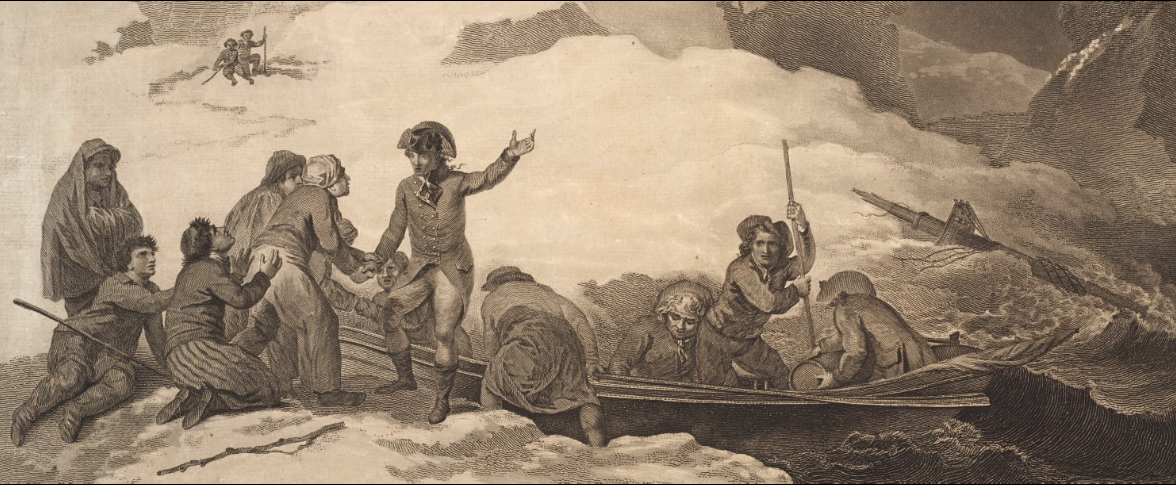
Samuel Waller Prentice, 84th Regiment, 4 January 1780, shipwrecked off Cape Breton, Nova Scotia, by Robert Pollard (1784)

The distinguished war hero, Lieutenant Colonel Allan Maclean of Torloisk (1725–83), was authorized by Lieutenant General Thomas Gage to raise a regiment from Scottish communities in Canada, New York and the Carolinas. The 84th Highland Regiment was the first to be raised from American Loyalists. The soldiers were drawn from those who had served Britain in the Seven Years' War – the 42nd Regiment of Foot (Black Watch), 77th Regiment of Foot (Montgomerie's Highlanders), and 78th Fraser Highlanders.

The prospect of raising regiments in the Thirteen Colonies was a dangerous mission. Only two battalions of the five originally requested were raised because of the difficulty of recruiting. When Maclean arrived in New York not long after the war broke out, he was warned not to disembark in his uniform for fear of attack. As a result, when travelling alone he dressed as a doctor. The dangers of recruiting American Loyalists became even clearer after the Battle of Moore's Creek Bridge, a patriot victory, in North Carolina.

==== Battle of Moore's Creek Bridge, North Carolina ====
Members of the 84th Highland Regiment were in the Battle of Moore's Creek Bridge, North Carolina, in early 1776. On 27 February 1776, the 84th Regiment, with a number of new recruits, was marching to the port of Wilmington, North Carolina. There they were to join with a force arriving from Europe and participate in operations in the southern colonies. The recruited force, at first numbering 1,600 American Loyalists but reduced during the march by desertions to fewer than 800, faced off against 1,000 American Patriots. The American Loyalists' movement was blocked by Patriot forces on two occasions, but the Loyalists managed to bypass them to reach the bridge over Widow Moore's Creek. Captain McLeod, who had survived the Battle of Bunker Hill, was killed leading history's last known Highland charge at Moore's Creek Bridge. Half of the regiment was captured and thirty were killed; with ninety six officers and men taken prisoner. The majority of the Carolina recruits were never able to join the regiment since the Loyalist forces were scattered after the battle.

Lt. Col. Donald MacDonald helped with the recruiting in North Carolina and fought in the Battle of Moore's Creek Bridge. Both MacLean and MacDonald were taken prisoner.

=== Sorel, Quebec, Headquarters, 1st Battalion ===
In 1777 the Headquarters moved from Quebec to Sorel.

=== Military operations – Quebec ===
Under McLean's command, the First Battalion acted primarily to defend Quebec from American Patriot forces. It marched from Quebec in an attempt to repel Brigadier General Richard Montgomery's invasion in the Siege of Fort St. Jean, Quebec. The regiment made two attempts to relieve the fort, but eventually returned to Quebec, where it helped to stiffen the resolve of the civil population until Carleton's return from Montreal.

The regiment was also involved in the Battle of Quebec. Montgomery and Benedict Arnold, who led an expedition through the wilderness of what is now Maine, combined forces and mounted attack on Quebec City. At a crucial moment in the battle, Captain McDougal led 120 of the 84th and 60 Royal Navy sailors against a force of New Hampshire troops commanded by Henry Dearborn. They overwhelmed Dearborn's men, forcing the survivors to surrender.

=== Military operations – Thirteen Colonies ===
Later in the war, they took part in raids upon Lake Champlain in 1778 and into the Mohawk Valley in 1780, 1781 and 1782.

== Second Battalion ==
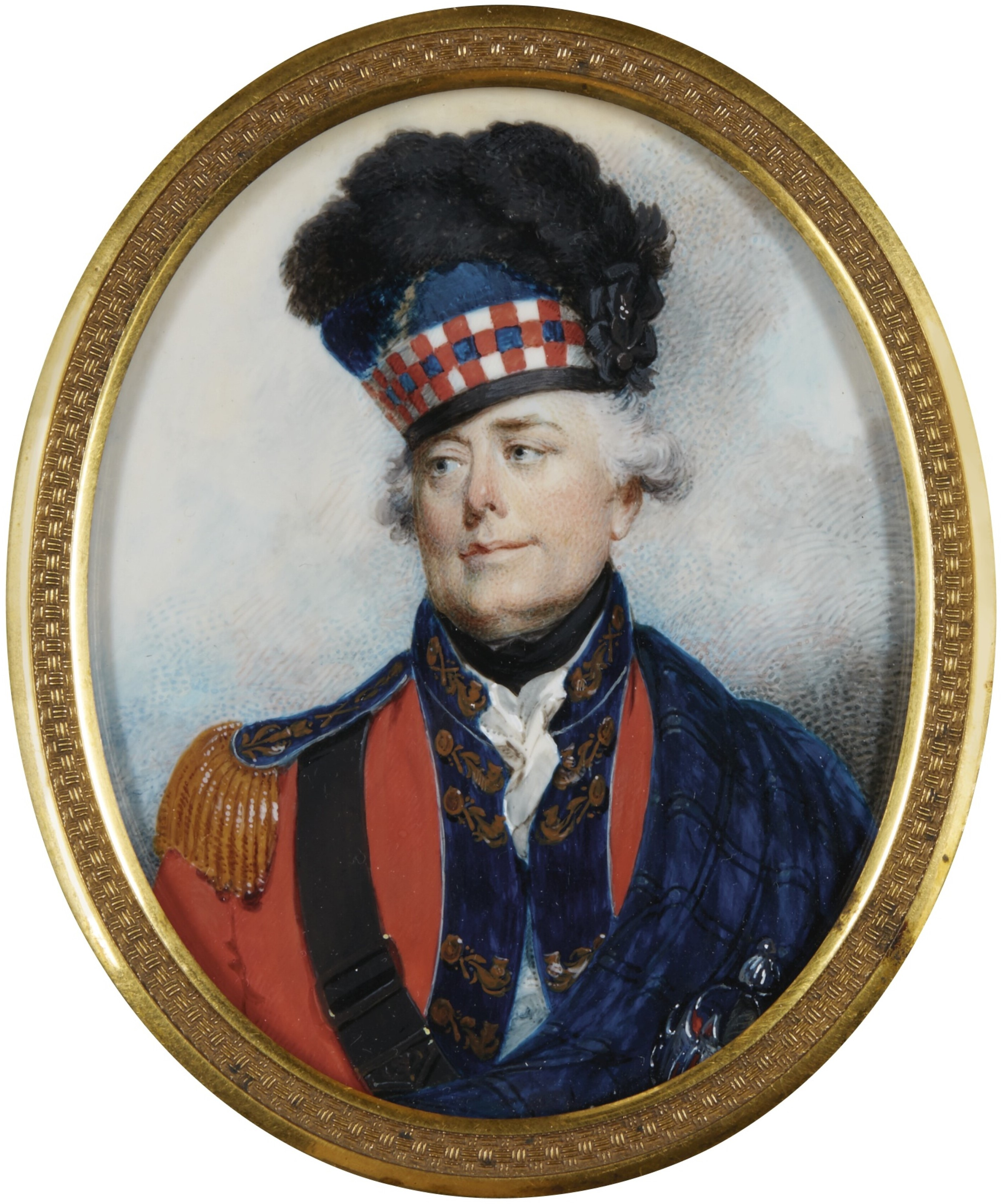
Major General John Small, Commander, 2nd Battalion

=== Historical context – Atlantic Canada ===
The 84th was tasked with defending British maritime provinces from American Revolutionary attacks by land and sea. Throughout the war, American privateers devastated the maritime economy by raiding many of the coastal communities. There were constant attacks by American privateers, such as the Sack of Lunenburg, Nova Scotia (1782), numerous raids on Liverpool, Nova Scotia (October 1776, March 1777, September, 1777, May 1778, September 1780) and a raid on Annapolis Royal, Nova Scotia (1781). There was also a naval engagement with a French fleet at Sydney, Nova Scotia, near Spanish River, Cape Breton (1781).

In the fall of 1775 General George Washington authorized some ship's captains to engage in privateering activities. In violation of their charter (which allowed the taking of ships but not raids on land targets), the privateering ships Hancock and Franklin made an unopposed landing at Charlottetown, Prince Edward Island, on 17 November 1775. Three days later, they sailed to Nova Scotia and raided Canso, Nova Scotia. In 1779, American privateers returned to Canso and destroyed the fisheries, which were worth £50,000 a year to Britain.

To guard against such attacks, the 84th was garrisoned at forts around the maritime provinces. One such fort was Fort Howe, at the mouth of the Bay of Fundy at what is now Saint John, New Brunswick. As soon as the fort was built, it was immediately pillaged and burned by American privateers (August, 1775). Saint John was raided three more times in the span of two months (1777) before the 84th was able to rebuild Fort Howe.

In Newfoundland, American privateers sacked numerous ports such as Chateau Bay (1778) and Twillingate (1779). Off the coast of Newfoundland, the 84th Regiment were the first to defeat an American privateer in the Battle of the Newcastle Jane (1776). Major Small also had companies from the 84th Regiment stationed in Fort Frederick, Placentia, Newfoundland.

The 84th Regiment also defended Nova Scotia, attacking an American privateer off Lunenburg, Nova Scotia (1775). The 84th was led by Captain John MacDonald. They boarded the warship when part of its crew were ashore seeking plunder. They captured the crew and sailed her into Halifax.

There were also Patriot attacks on Nova Scotia by land, such as the Battle of Fort Cumberland (also known as the Eddy Rebellion). There was the constant fear that American Patriots would attack Halifax, Nova Scotia, by land. The threat involved American Patriots landing in Windsor and marching to Halifax. As a result, in the summer of 1778, Major John Small moved the headquarters of the 84th Regiment from Halifax to Fort Edward (Nova Scotia) in Windsor.

=== Major General John Small, Commander, 2nd Battalion ===
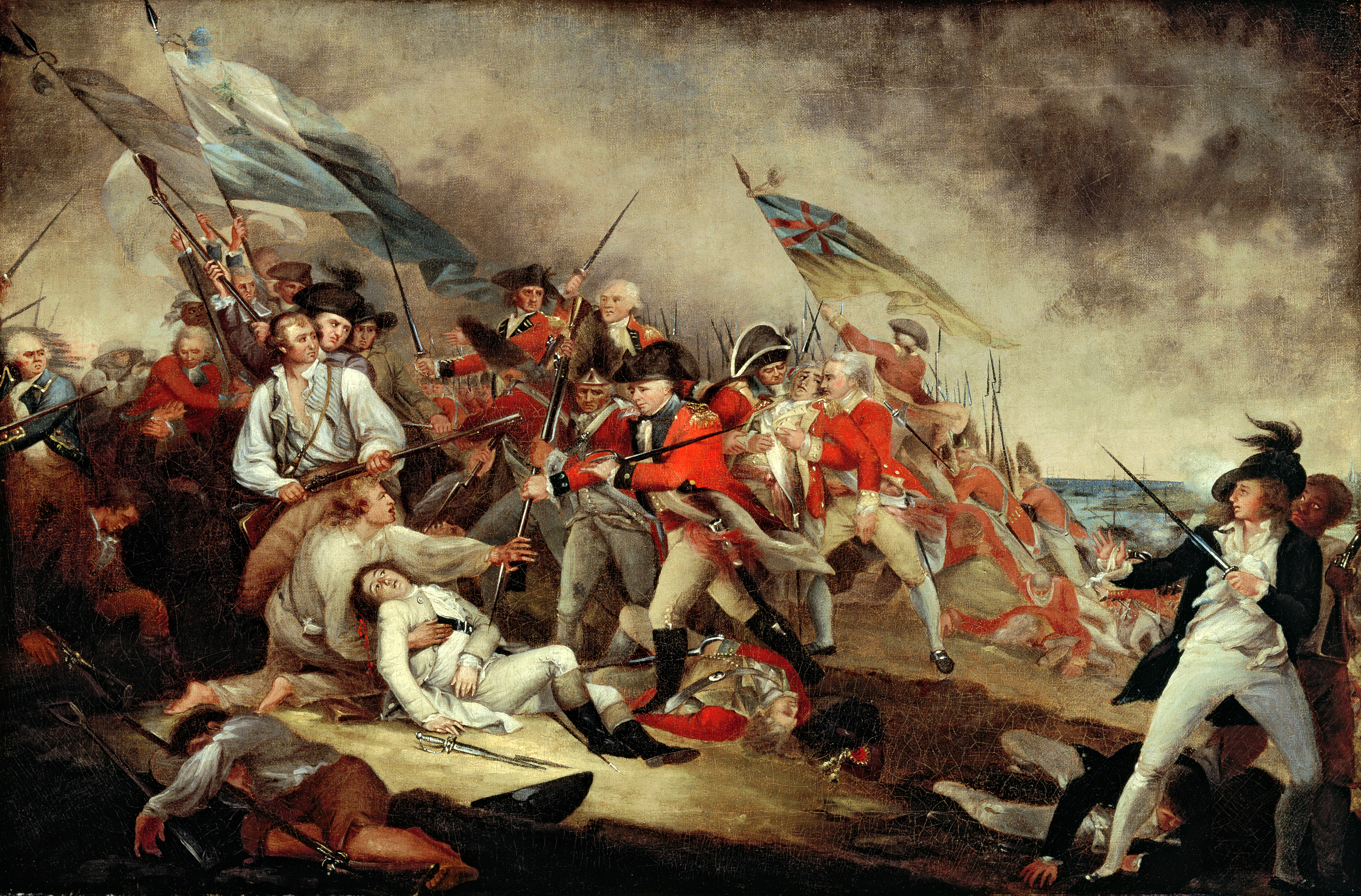
Major Small (centre, standing) intervenes to protect Joseph Warren in The Death of General Warren at the Battle of Bunker Hill by John Trumbull

When Col. Allan Maclean landed in America, he discovered that Major General John Small, was already mobilizing American Loyalists from the 13 Colonies as well as present day Ontario, Quebec and Atlantic Canada to create a Highland Regiment. Along with getting soldiers who fought in 77th Regiment of Foot (Montgomerie's Highlanders) and 78th Regiment of Foot (Fraser's Highlanders), Small was recruiting soldiers from the 42nd Regiment of Foot (Black Watch); the same regiment that he had served with in the Seven Years' War. The regiment was known as the "Young Royal Highlanders" until it turned into the 84th Regiment.

Small was involved with also recruiting new immigrants as they arrived off transports from the British Isles. On one occasion, the transport George arrived in New York with 172 immigrant Highlanders. Major Small went aboard, explained the situation, and pressed the men into service. Small gave them assurance that their families would be well taken care of by the regiment. The same thing happened on 3 October 1775, with Scottish immigrants arriving in New York on the ship Glasgow. On that occasion, there were 255 immigrants (men and their families). Upon Small redirecting the immigrants to Halifax, the officer in command in Halifax reported that their amount of luggage was enough to "fill St. Paul's Church."

==== Battle of Bunker Hill, Boston ====
Major John Small was engaged to establish the Royal Highland Emigrants on 13 June 1775. Five days later, on 17 June, before recruits could be found, Small and a number of other officers of the 84th Regiment were in the Battle of Bunker Hill. Small was a central figure in the battle, leading the 38th and 43rd Regiments in storming the hill. Along with three other members of the 84th Regiment who were wounded, Small was also wounded in the arm by cannon fire. He relayed his experience to John Trumbull, who then painted his famous painting The Death of General Warren at the Battle of Bunker Hill, in which Major Small is one of the central figures in the painting. Although the British won the battle, it was very costly: 226 were killed and 828 were wounded.

=== Fort Edward, Headquarters, 2nd Battalion ===
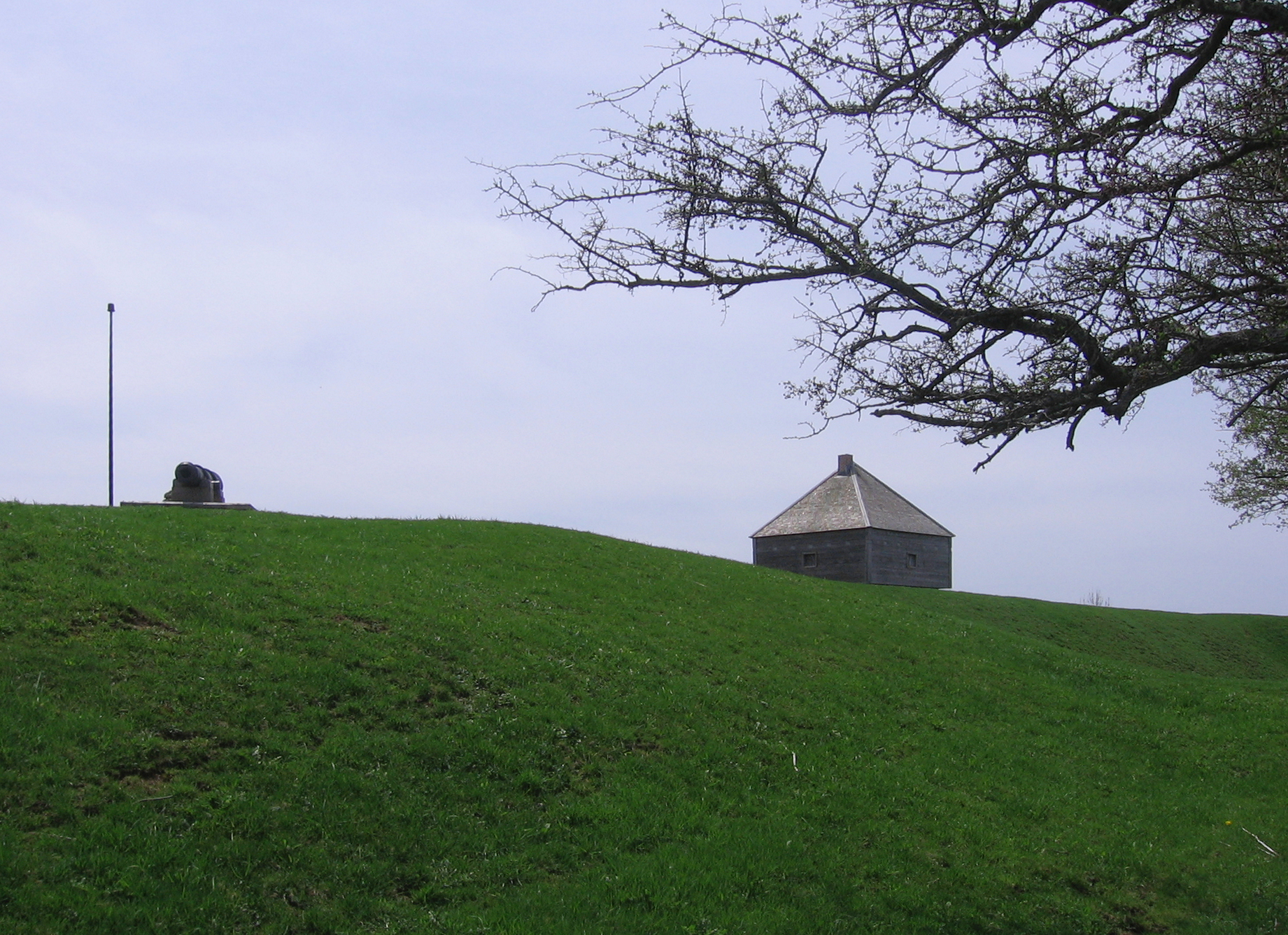
Fort Edward, 84th Headquarters

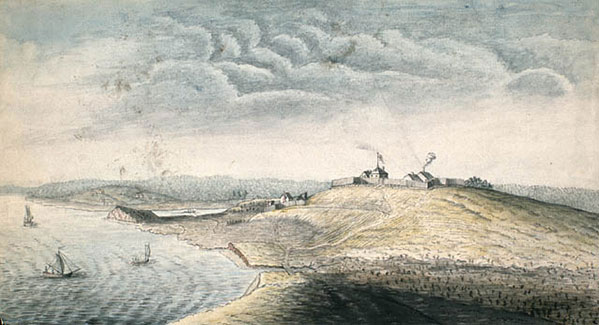
Fort Edward, 84th Headquarters (1753)

Fort Edward (Nova Scotia) in Windsor was the Headquarters for the 84th Regiment in Atlantic Canada.

Initially, the headquarters for the 84th Regiment was in Halifax. During the nine years of the war, members of the Battalion served on Detachments around Halifax: the Redoubt & Fort Needham (Halifax), Fort Sackville (Bedford), Fort Charlotte (Georges Island (Nova Scotia), Fort Clarence (Eastern Battery, Dartmouth). The 84th Regiment was also stationed at four locations around the Bay of Fundy: Fort Edward (Windsor), Fort Anne (Annapolis), Fort Cumberland (Amherst), and Fort Howe (Saint John). There were also forts that the 84th were stationed at on Cape Sable, Fort Cornwallis (Kentville, Nova Scotia), Sydney Mines Battery (Spanish River, Sydney), Fort Frederick (Placentia, Nfld.). The Regiment was also at Fort Hughes (New Brunswick) (Oromocto, New Brunswick). As well the 84th Regiment was stationed at forts in the 13 Colonies: Brooklyn Heights (New York) and Ft. Augusta (Georgia).

Because of the threat of a land assault on Halifax by landings in Windsor, Small moved the headquarters for the 84th Highland Regiment from Halifax to Fort Edward, Windsor (1778). The 84th operated on land and sea. In June 1779, for example, the 84th Regiment at Fort Edward had captured twelve American privateers, who had plundered many small vessels and neighbouring inhabitants on the Bay of Fundy. The prisoners were wounded. The prisoners were almost rescued by another American privateer vessel the Statagem, from Marblehead which had a crew of nine. Upon seeing the fate of the prisoners, however, they abandoned the rescue mission for fear of sharing the same fate. One report stated, "It is to be hoped that if they dare return they will fare no better."

Small assigned Captain Allan Macdonald, husband of the famous Scottish heroine Flora MacDonald, to be the commander of Fort Edward for five years.

==== Flora MacDonald ====
Captain Allan Macdonald had fought in the Battle of Moore's Creek Bridge in North Carolina, where he was captured. He was imprisoned for two years until a prisoner exchange in 1777, when he was sent to New York and then to Fort Edward in Windsor, Nova Scotia. Major Small gave him command of the Second Battalion, 84th Regiment, at Fort Edward (Nova Scotia). He served there along with two of his sons, Ranald and Charles, who were among the young officers of the regiment.

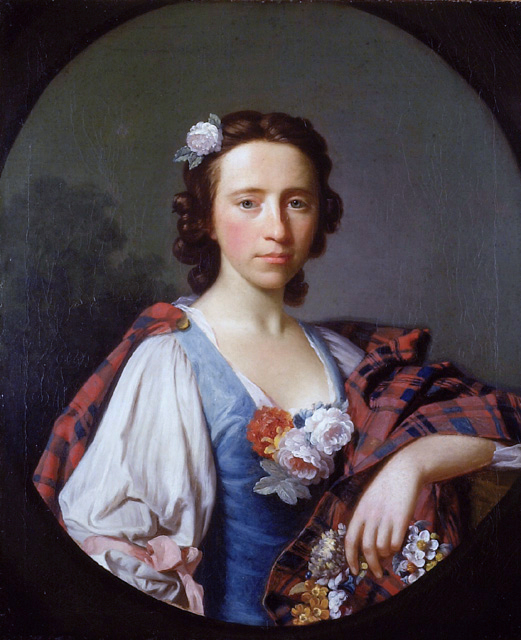
Flora MacDonald by Allan Ramsay (artist)

In 1750, at the age of 28, Flora married Captain Allan Macdonald of Kingsburgh, and in 1773 together they emigrated to Montgomery County (formerly Anson), North Carolina. Flora actively participated in recruiting men for the 84th Highland Regiment, displaying once more her resolution. She exhorted the 84th Regiment at Cross Creek, North Carolina (present-day Fayetteville) before they went off to fight in the Battle of Moore's Creek Bridge. After Flora's husband was taken prisoner, Flora remained in hiding while the American Patriots ravaged her family plantation and she lost all her possessions. When her husband was released from prison, she travelled with him out of North Carolina to New York and then to Fort Edward in Windsor, Nova Scotia, in the fall of 1778. Flora only stayed in Nova Scotia for one year at Fort Edward, Windsor. In 1779 Flora returned home to Dunvegan Castle in Isle of Skye, Scotland. After the war, in 1784, Allan followed her.

There is a plaque at Fort Edward which reads:

"Flora MacDonald: A name that will be mentioned in history, and if courage and fidelity be virtures, mentioned with honour" - Samuel Johnson

The preserve of Bonnie Prince Charlie spent the winter of 1779 here with her husband, Captain Allan Macdonald of the Royal Highland Emigrants, when returning to her old home in Skye. After exile from her home in North Carolina. Her loyalty and devotion in the midst of troubled days have long been told in Scottish song and story.

=== Military operations – Atlantic Canada ===
==== Battle of Newcastle Jane, Newfoundland ====
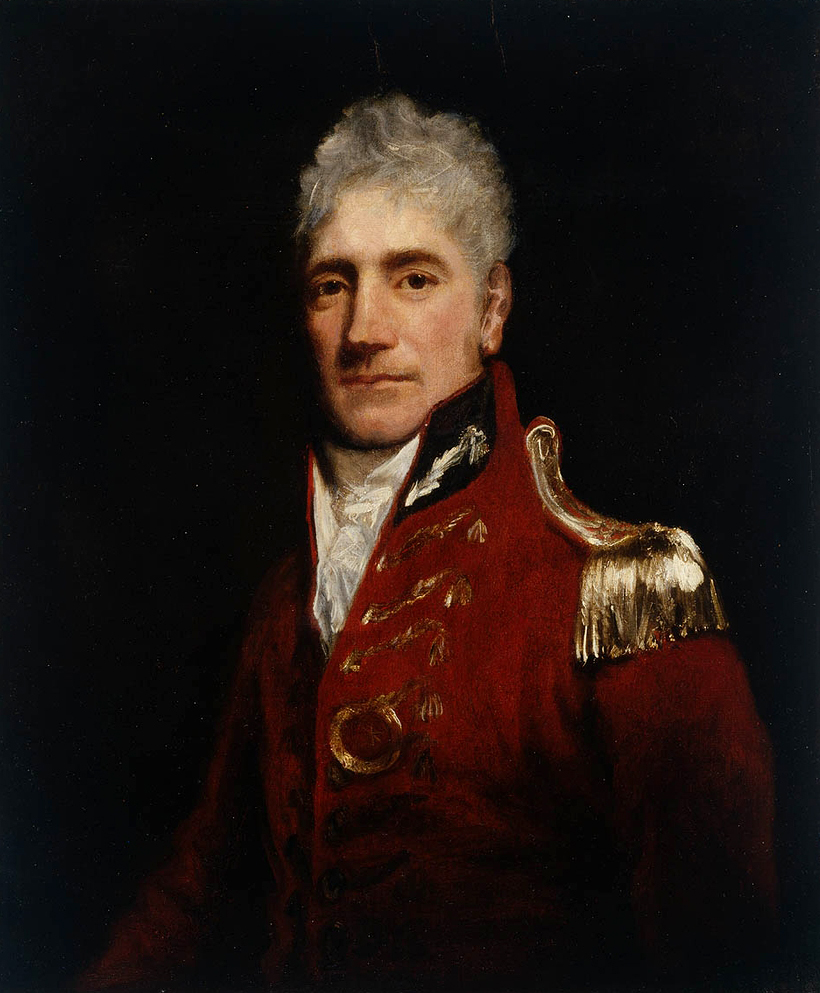
Macquarie by John Opie (1761–1807)

On 23 October 1776, under the Captain Murdock MacLaine, the 84th Regiment was in the Battle of the Newcastle Jane. This battle was the first in which a merchant British vessel defeated an American Privateer vessel. The 84th Regiment was on the transport ship Newcastle Jane off the coast of Cape Race, Newfoundland. On board the ship was 20,000 pounds sterling and 3,000 sets of uniforms, much of which was for the 84th Regiment. On 23 October at 4:00 am American privateer came within 30 yards of Newcastle Jane. The American had ten carriage guns and twelve swivel guns and Newcastle Jane had only 6 three-pound carriage guns and a few swivels. The ships opened fire on each other. After a 24-hour standoff, the 84th Regiment had outmanoeuvred the Americans, leaving them with many wounded and a damaged vessel. By the time the battle was over, Newcastle Jane only had two rounds of shot left.

===== Lachlan Macquarie =====
One of the crew in the Battle of Newcastle Jane was a young recruit Lachlan Macquarie, who eventually became known as "the Father of Australia." Macquarie began his military career in 1776 at the age of fourteen when he sailed from Scotland to the New World. The attackers were repulsed and, six months later, on 9 April 1777, he obtained an ensigncy in the 84th Regiment. He did garrison duty, first in Nova Scotia, and then in New York and Charleston. He was commissioned a lieutenant in the 71st Regiment in January 1781. In 1784 he returned to Scotland from his posting in Jamaica, and was reduced to half-pay.

==== Siege of Saint John (1777) ====
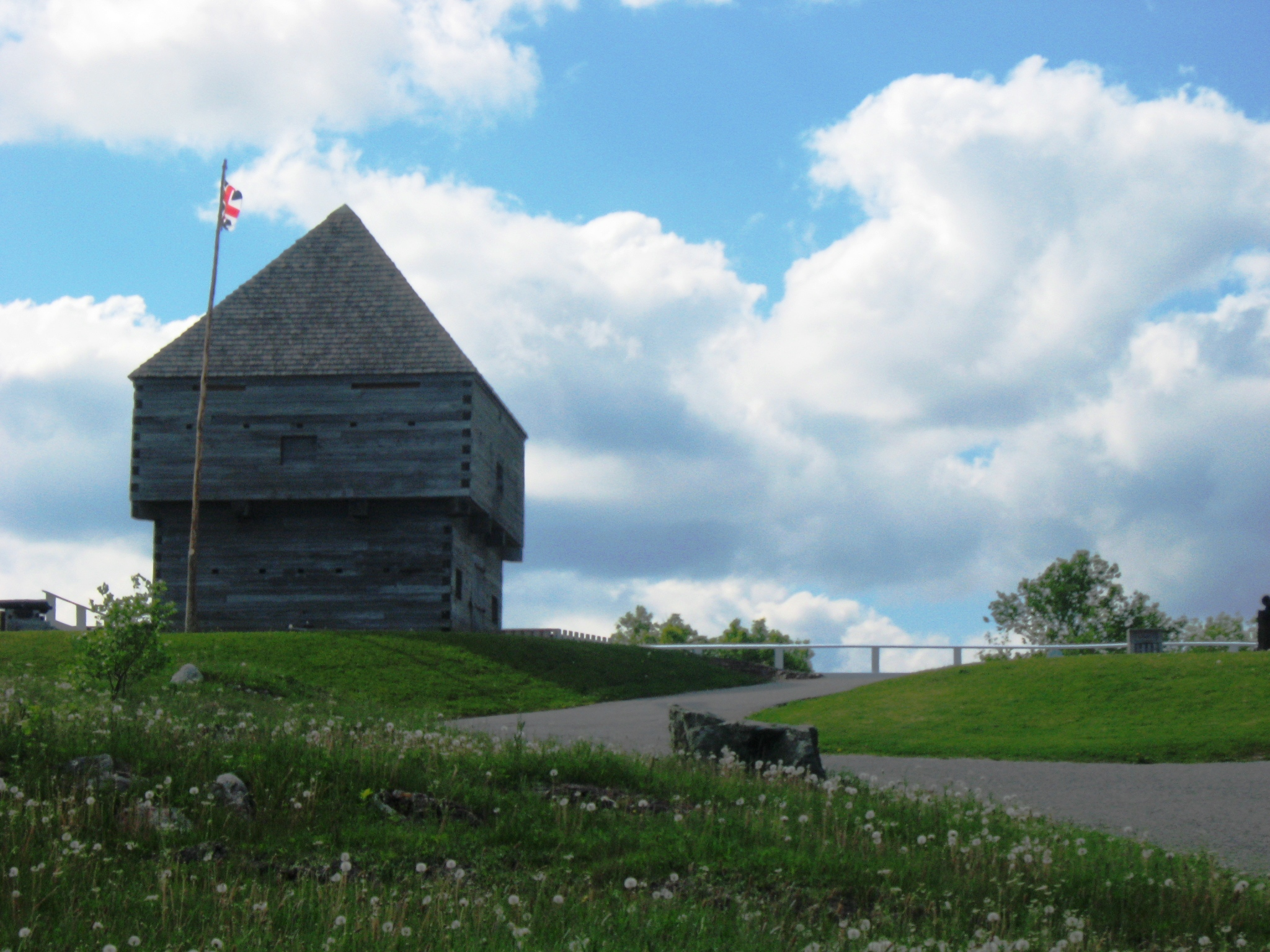
Fort Howe

Machias, Maine was used as a base for privateering against Nova Scotia and as a staging and supply point for American Patriot attacks on Fort Frederick, Saint John and Fort Cumberland. In 1776, privateers from Machias had burned Fort Frederick at Saint John to the ground. In 1777, American forces briefly controlled Saint John. In response, Major John Small personally led a force to drive out the Americans. When the 84th Regiment landed at Saint John on 30 June 1777, the Americans retreated to the woods. The 84th marched through the woods and were ambushed by the American. Twelve Americans and one member of the regiment were killed. Weeks later, on 13 July 1777, American privateers again attacked Saint John and were repulsed by the 84th. In August 1777, the Americans attacked yet again and were successful, carrying off 21 boatloads of plunder. The 84th immediately began to replace the low-lying Fort Frederick with Fort Howe, which overlooked the settlement. Fort Howe became instrumental in curtailing privateer action and was used as an assembly point for attacks on the 13 Colonies.

==== Raid on Cape Sable Island, Nova Scotia ====
On 4 September 1778, the 84th Regiment, under the command of Ranald MacKinnon, was in the Raid of Cape Sable Island. Privateers were threatening Cape Sable Island when the 84th arrived; they surprised the ship in the night and destroyed it. For his aggressive action, MacKinnon was praised highly by Brigadier General Eyre Massey. In response, one of his friends, Captain MacDonald, wrote to Major John Small, "McKinnon was embarrassed by the praise of the General and requested it not be inserted in the record since he only did his duty."

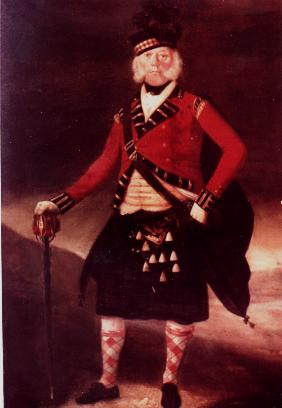
Captain Ranald MacKinnon

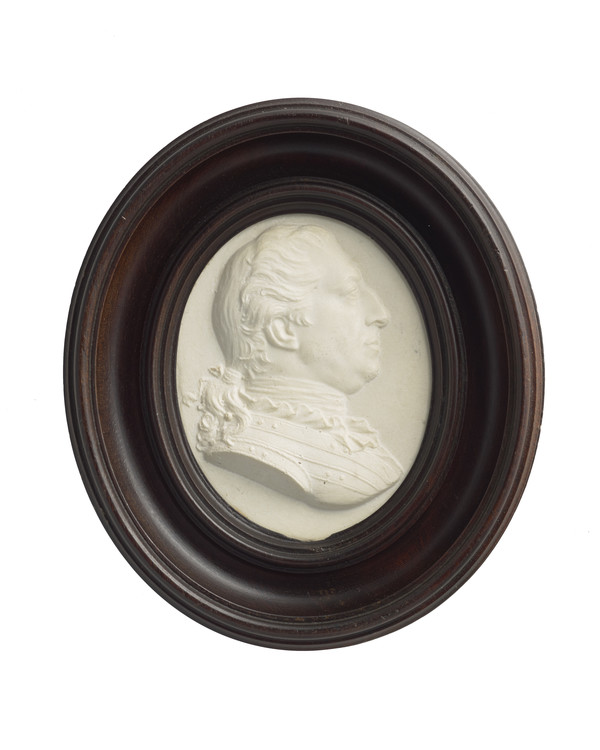
1894 marble portrait of Massey after a cameo medallion by James Tassie

==== Annapolis Royal, Nova Scotia ====
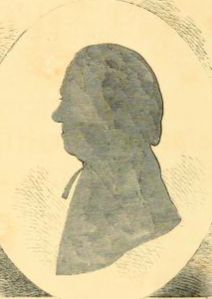
Rev. Jacob Bailey, Deputy Chaplain to the 84th Regiment

On 2 October 1778, the 84th Regiment, under the command of Captain MacDonald, was involved in the defeat of an American privateer at Annapolis Royal, Nova Scotia. Captain MacDonald arrived at Annapolis by ship, only to find a large privateer ship raiding the port. He destroyed the privateer vessel, which mounted ten carriage guns. Captain MacDonald also caught the attention of General Massey, who wrote that he "highly approved" of his conduct.

Captain Campbell of the 84th Regiment, in December 1778, took seven men with him to retrieve an American privateer that was abandoned on Partridge Island. They returned the ship safely to Annapolis Royal.

In 1780, Rev. Jacob Bailey was appointed the Deputy Chaplain to the 84th Regiment.

In another raid on Annapolis Royal in 1781, prisoners were captured by the crew of an American privateer and later released on parole on promise of exchange for an American prisoner at Halifax.

=== Military operations – Thirteen Colonies ===
==== Maine ====
In November 1777, the 84th Regiment was involved in the raid of a fort at Castine, Maine, a privateering port at the mouth of the Penobscot River. The capture of this vital port interrupted its use as a staging area by privateers to attack Nova Scotia.

==== Southern theatre ====
Upon leaving New York, the Second Battalion, 84th Regiment was engaged in the Southern theatre of the American Revolutionary War. The Southern theater was the central area of operations in the second half of the American Revolutionary War. During the first three years of the conflict, the primary military encounters had been in the north, focused on campaigns around the cities of Boston, New York, and Philadelphia. Earlier in the war, the 2/84th Regiment was involved in trying to take Charleston, South Carolina, in the Battle of Sullivan's Island. On 24 June, companies of the 2/84th Regiment from Boston and New York left their ports to descend upon Fort Sullivan (later renamed Fort Moultrie), South Carolina. Four days later the 84th Regiment from New York, on 28 June 1776, engaged in the Battle of Fort Sullivan (see Fort Moultrie National Monument). The fleet bombarded the fort and suffered excessive damage by return fire. The attack was a failure; 38 of the regiment died.

The 2/84th Regiment was involved in a skirmish at Wiboo Swamp, Savannah River, Clarendon County, South Carolina (1781). 3 of the 84th Regiment were killed as were about 18 American Patriots.

The 2/84th Regiment was then involved in protecting the Loyalist stronghold of Augusta, Georgia. The first skirmish was at Wiggin's Hill, Savannah River, Georgia, in April 1781. The Patriots surprised the regiment at Wiggin's Hill, but were twice repulsed. The 84th then took prisoners, killed many of them and burned their homes. Captain McKinnon tried to stop what he considered his own regiments "barbarity". The 84th was also involved with trying to protect Fort Motte in the Siege of Fort Motte, Georgia (1781). The 2/84th Regiment was forced to surrender on 12 May and were taken prisoner.

===== Siege of Ninety-Six, South Carolina =====
On 18 June 1781, the 2/84th Regiment was involved with the relief of the American Loyalists besieged by Americans Patriots in the Siege of Ninety-Six. The American Patriots were trying to defeat the American Loyalists who were trapped in an earthen fortification known as the Star Fort. The American Patriots had 1,000 troops in a siege against the 550 American Loyalists. On the 28th day of the siege, Lord Rawdon, along with the 2/84th Regiment arrived. The American Patriots retreated and those in the Star Fort were saved, although Ninety-Six was abandoned by the British not long after.

====== John Bond ======
One of those in the Star Fort who belonged to the Ninety-Six Militia was Captain John Bond. Along with the rest of the American Loyalists from Ninety-Six, John Bond eventually left South Carolina and settled in Rawdon Township (see Rawdon, Nova Scotia), the place being named after Lord Rawdon who had saved them in the siege.

===== Battle of Eutaw Springs =====
The American Patriots attacked Orangeburg, South Carolina, with 2,600 troops. The 2/84th were part of a British force of 2,300, which stopped their advance at the Battle of Eutaw Springs on 8 September 1781. In the battle, the 84th Regiment lost 6 killed, 22 wounded and 2 missing.

===== Skirmish at Fair Lawn =====
In the last months of the war, the Second Battalion, 84th Regiment, defending Charleston, was involved in the Skirmish at Fair Lawn (also known as Fair Lawn Barony, Colleton House, "below Monck's Corner"). The battalion was in the area of the hospital where many of their fellow wounded soldiers were located. They were also stationed at a blockhouse near Baggen's Bridge, which lead directly to Charleston. They had few soldiers in the area and the captain in charge was forced to choose between either protecting the hospital or protecting the bridge that led to Charleston. He chose to protect the bridge. On 17 November 1781, the American Patriots attacked the undefended hospital; pillaging it and then burning the building to the ground. Most of the wounded were dragged into the surrounding woods and swamps, where they died from exposure and maltreatment.

After this incident, the 2/84th Regiment went to Georgia, Florida and Jamaica. In Georgia, they were involved in the skirmish on the Ogeechee River, Burke County (1781).

== Uniform and equipment ==
The 84th was the only Highland regiment to keep and use its traditional highland uniform; plaids and swords, for the duration of the war. General Gage specified that the new military unit would be "cloathed Armed and accoutred in like manner with His Majesty's Royal Highland Regiment", indicating that they would wear the Highland Scots military uniform, unlike the more conventional uniforms worn by other Provincial units.

The original uniform of the first battalion was the green Provincial uniform, consisting of a long, green coat, tri-cornered black hat, breeches, and gray hose. They were armed with surplus King's Long Land Muskets from the Seven Years' War. In the second quarter of 1777, they received kilts, belted plaids (or perhaps both) in the government sett and wore these with their green Provincial coats (which were shortened) until these wore out, at which time they were replaced with the red coats of regulars.

The Second Battalion did not do as well; having to provide for their own uniforms until the local governor was formally ordered to clothe and arm them in the autumn of 1776. Upon their incorporation into the Regular Establishment, their uniform was standardized to the short Highland- style coat with dark blue facings and white turnbacks. The regimental lace is presumed to have been white tape, with one blue worm between two red ones: but this description is based on a later 84th Regiment's practices. No contemporary descriptions of the regimental lace have been discovered. Buttons had one of three variations; all of which incorporated "84th" with the customary Highland embellishment. The men were issued plaids or kilts of government sett. Each man was also issued a bonnet, multiple shirts and a white wool waistcoat with regimentally marked buttons. (In addition, each man was issued two pairs of gaitered trousers, one of linen for the summer and one of blue wool for the winter. - this statement not currently supported by documentation). Companies in the South Theatre were issued brown wool gaitered trousers for the winter instead of blue wool. Officers' uniforms used gold lace and buttons. In winter, it was common for the men to wear trousers and plaids simultaneously. Members stationed in Canada were issued a wool waistcoat, a blanket coat, overshoes, a watch cape, mittens, ice creepers, and snow shoes.

== Disbanded ==
After the American Revolution, the soldiers of the 2nd Battalion, 84th Regiment became part of the migration of the United Empire Loyalists to Nova Scotia. The 2/84th Regiment evacuated Charlotte, North Carolina, and went to New York in April 1782 and then on to Halifax, arriving on 24 October 1782. Major Small followed them, arriving on the frigate Jason on 12 November. Small arrived with a number of the settlers that the 84th Regiment had saved in the Siege of Ninety-Six. These men founded Rawdon Township (currently, Rawdon, Nova Scotia, and area). After the 2nd Battalion was disbanded at the headquarters for the 84th Regiment Fort Edward (Nova Scotia) on 10 October 1783, many of the 84th Regiment settled beside Rawdon Township in the newly formed Douglas Township (Kennetcook, Nova Scotia and surrounding area).

Major Small purchased Malachy Salter's grant (present day Selma, Nova Scotia) and built a manor house on an estate which he named "Selma", after which the community is named. Small had hoped to establish the Feudal Barony of Straloch in Selma but his last will and testament was not honoured.

The First battalion settled mainly in Kingston, Ontario. A few took passage, instead, to Britain. This unit, the "old 84th", was completely disbanded and has no direct descendants in the military of the modern United Kingdom. Later regiments to bear this number (84th (York and Lancaster) Regiment of Foot) have no historical nor traditional connection to it. However, the Canadian Army considers the 84th to be continued in the Stormont, Dundas and Glengarry Highlanders.

=== 84th Regiment soldiers in Hants County, Nova Scotia ===
The following is a list of the soldiers from the 84th Regiment who settled in Douglas Township in Hants County, Nova Scotia, after the war:

- Hector Maclean (politician), Kennetcook, Nova Scotia
- Abraham Blois, Gore, Nova Scotia
- Alexander Cameron, Minasville, Nova Scotia
- James Dalrymple, Kennetcook, Nova Scotia
- Lewis Ettinger, Kennetcook, Nova Scotia
- Christian Hennigar, Kennetcook, Nova Scotia
- Thomas Laffin, Kennetcook, Nova Scotia

For list of the 84th Regiment soldiers who settled in the Douglas Township see Duncanson, John (1989). Rawdon and Douglas: Two Loyalists Townships in Nova Scotia. Ontario: Mika Publishing Company.

=== 84th Regiment soldiers in Eastern, Ontario ===
- Patrick Sinclair
- William Brannan, E. District
- Richard Campbell, Marysburgh Township, Ontario
- Donald Cameron, Charlottenb'g
- William Cameron, Cornwall
- James Chavassey, Marysburgh Township, Ontario
- Michael Conlon, Kingston
- Link to site of all the 84th Regiment who settled in Eastern Ontario

== See also ==
- Military history of Nova Scotia
- King's Orange Rangers
- Nova Scotia in the American Revolution
