= Ranald MacKinnon =

British soldier and civil servant (1737–1805)

- Born: 1737; Isle of Skye, Scotland
- Died: 28 April 1805 (aged 67–68); Shelburne, Nova Scotia
- Burial place: Christchurch Anglican Cemetery, Shelburne
- Military career
- Allegiance: Great Britain
- Branch: Army
- Service years: 1758–1783
- Rank: Lieutenant 1758–1763; Captain 1775–1783; Colonel of Militia 1775–1783
- Units: Montgomerie's Highlanders (77th Reg't.); Royal Highland Emigrants (84th Reg't.)
- Commands: Queens County (Nova Scotia) Militia
- Conflicts: French and Indian War; American Revolutionary War

Ranald MacKinnon (sometimes spelled McKinnon) was a soldier and a civil servant of the British Empire from 1758 until his death in 1805.

As a junior officer he served with Montgomerie's Highlanders (77th Regiment of Foot) in the French and Indian War in North America, primarily in Pennsylvania and North Carolina. During the American Revolutionary War he served as a junior officer of the Royal Highland Emigrants (84th Regiment of Foot), and also as colonel of the militia of Queens County, Nova Scotia. He was, in large part, responsible for ensuring that southwestern Nova Scotia remained loyal to the King during the Revolution.

The district now known as the Municipality of the District of Argyle was named by MacKinnon in reference to his homeland in western Scotland.

== French and Indian War ==
Ranald MacKinnon was born in the Isle of Skye in 1737. His ancestry can be traced to Ian Na Mishnish, chief of the MacKinnon clan On September 21, 1758, he was commissioned as a lieutenant in the 77th Reg't. of Foot. He served with the 77th in several campaigns during the war, including Gen. John Forbes' expedition against Fort Duquesne, now Pittsburgh, PA, in 1758. He was wounded in battle against the Cherokee Nation in North Carolina during the Anglo-Cherokee War in 1760, but recovered to join the expedition to retake St. John's, NL from the French in 1762. At the end of the war in 1763 he went on half-pay, and soon found a job as part of a surveying party in southwest Nova Scotia.

== Between the Wars ==
MacKinnon took a liking to an area of southwest NS known by the Mi'qmaw people as Abuptic. With its seacoast islands and rivers it reminded him of his home in the Inner Hebrides. He applied to the Assembly of Nova Scotia for a grant of 2,000 acres, which was given on 1 April 1766. MacKinnon's grant extended to the north of what is now called the Argyle River, including Robert's Island and Ste. Anne du Ruisseau. MacKinnon chose to call this area Argyle, after his native home.

On 20 November 1766, he married Letitia Piggot, the daughter of a British Army officer, in Halifax. The couple had five sons and eight daughters over the coming years. One son, John, went on to represent the County of Shelburne in the provincial Legislature from 1820 to 1832. MacKinnon settled on what is now called Sargent's Hill, just north of the Argyle River in Glenwood. The lands he sub-divided to John are now known as MacKinnon's Neck.

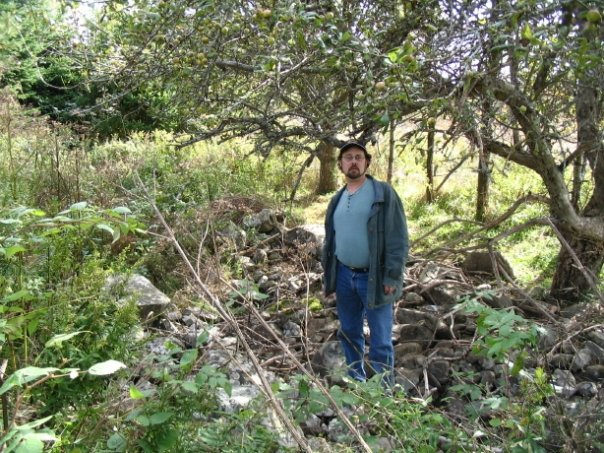
The remains Ranald MacKinnon's home, Sargeant's Hill in Glenwood, Nova Scotia. The pear trees are likely his original plantings.

During the 1760s the government of Nova Scotia encouraged New Englanders to emigrate. Many of these Planters moved to established townships, such as Yarmouth. Others chose to take up lands where townships had not been established, like Argyle. In 1763, Jeremiah Frost and fifteen other families arrived from New England and settled on the Abuptic River, south of the lands that would be granted to MacKinnon.

With the end of the French and Indian War in 1763, the British government allowed Acadians who had been expelled from Nova Scotia in 1755 and afterwards to return if they chose to do so. Many did so choose, but as most of their former lands had been seized by New Englanders they were forced to re-settle to other areas, such as Pubnico. MacKinnon was willing to lease some of his lands to Acadians in the area of Ste. Anne du Ruisseau, much to the disgust of the New Englanders, who were prejudiced against the Acadians as Papists.

In general, MacKinnon did not get along well with his Planter neighbours and they were sometimes openly hostile to him. "McKinnon was alien to them in many other ways: he was an Anglican among dissenters, a customs official among inveterate smugglers, and an aristocrat among levellers."

== American Revolutionary War ==
News of the outbreak of war in Massachusetts, specifically the battles of Lexington and Concord and Bunker Hill, arrived in Argyle in the early summer of 1775. Most of the Argyle Planters were sympathetic to the rebellion; the Rev. John Frost preached a sermon in which he "expressed his hopes that the British forces in America might be returned to England 'confuted and confused'". Jeremiah Frost, his brother, a captain of the militia and the acknowledged leader of the Planters, went so far as to erect a Liberty Pole, openly announcing that the community had broken with the Crown. Nathaniel Ricker, another officer of the militia, chopped the Liberty Pole down.

Meanwhile, MacKinnon had traveled to Halifax to get support from the Council to suppress the rebellion in Argyle. The Governor in Council proposed:

That Mr. McKinnon do, without loss of time, proceed to Argyle with twenty men of the recruits now raising here for the King's service, and be furnished with four barrels of gunpowder and ball in proportion, to be by him accounted for.

MacKinnon returned to Argyle with his twenty armed men (probably from the Royal Fencible Americans) along with a commission as Colonel of the Militia of Queens County, which at that time stretched from Liverpool to Yarmouth. The presence of these armed men suppressed the attempted rebellion in Argyle, and essentially throughout southwest Nova Scotia.

MacKinnon's commission also recommended him for a place as an officer in the raising Royal Highland Emigrants. He became the captain of the light infantry company of the 2nd Battalion, where he remained for the duration. In November 1776, the light company (along with the grenadier company) of the 84th was sent to Windsor from Halifax for the relief of Fort Cumberland, and made a remarkable forced march of 50 miles (80.5 km) in two days, but both companies were becalmed in the Minas Basin and had to return to Windsor.

On September 4, 1778, MacKinnon led his company in the Raid of Cape Sable Island, surprising the crew of an American privateer, taking and burning the ship. For his aggressive action, MacKinnon was praised highly by Brigadier General Eyre Massey. In response, one of his friends, Cpt. MacDonald, wrote to Major John Small, "McKinnon was embarrassed by the praise of the General and requested it not be inserted in the record since he only did his duty." MacKinnon and his company took part in the Siege of Charleston and eventually stationed in Charleston. His company saw action around South Carolina as a detachment of the 84th at Wiggin's Hill near Augusta in 1781.

== Later years ==
With the arrival of the Loyalists following the war, Shelburne became the leading town in southwest Nova Scotia, and MacKinnon relocated there sometime before 1791. According to poll tax records he had gained a civil service position as an impost and excise tax collector, and was sufficiently well-to-do to be paying ten pounds sterling per year in poll taxes.

His feud with the Frost family of Argyle went on, at least in his mind. In December 1804, a few months prior to his death, MacKinnon wrote his daughter, Penelope, out of his will, "thus for her unnatural and perfidious conduct some three years back". Penelope had married a Frost.

Ranald MacKinnon died 28 April 1805, in Shelburne, at the age of 68.

== Slaves ==
At some point after receiving his grant in 1766, MacKinnon brought in a number of African slaves whom he had purchased, probably in North Carolina, where he had served during the French and Indian War. The number of people he held in slavery is unknown, but as the lands they worked for their sustenance was referred to as a "Slave farm" there were likely 2 - 3 families. However, there is no mention of slaves in MacKinnon's will (dated 1801), which leads to the conclusion that the slaves were liberated or sold sometime before that date.

== Bibliography ==
- Brown, George S.; Yarmouth, Nova Scotia: A Sequel to Campbell`s History; reprinted by the Argyle Municipal Historical and Genealogical Society, Tusket, NS, 1995.
- Campbell, Rev. J. R.; A History of the County of Yarmouth Nova Scotia; reprinted by Mika Studio, Belleville, ON, 1972. ISBN 0-919302-40-8
- Clarke, Ernest; The Siege of Fort Cumberland, 1776; McGill-Queen's University Press, Montreal & Kingston, 1995. ISBN 0-7735-1867-3
- Ricker, Jackson; Historical Sketches of Glenwood and the Argyles, Yarmouth County, NS; reprinted by Sentinel Printing Ltd., Yarmouth, NS, 1994.
