= Scotch Village, Nova Scotia =

Community in Nova Scotia, Canada

Coordinates: 45°3′19″N 63°59′51″W

Scotch Village in Nova Scotia

Scotch Village is an unincorporated community on the Kennetcook River in the Canadian province of Nova Scotia, located in the Municipality of West Hants. This area was part of Newport Township at the time of settlement primarily by Rhode Island Planters in the early 1760s. It was referred to as “Scotchman’s Dyke” or “Scotch Village”, due to settlement of early families of Scottish descent (Smith, etc.). Prior to the arrival of the Planters, Scotch Village had been the home of Mi'kmaq and Acadians.

Mi’kmaq and their ancestors have been in the Bay of Fundy area for over 10,000 years, long before Egyptians built pyramids or European agriculture began. They traded with Europeans for centuries, often providing them with the knowledge and resources needed to survive here. Mi’kmaq spirituality and way of life have been based on respectful and sustainable use of natural resources. They usually lived along rivers; summers along coast and winters inland to hunt. Up to 90% of food came from river and sea area. Mi’kmaq, respecting others’ ways of belief as well as their own, welcomed the French religion of Catholicism into their lives and befriended the French at Port Royal in 1605 where Chief Membertou became Catholic. Peace and Friendship treaties negotiated with the British between 1725 and 1761 are still valid today. The treaties recognized Mi’kmaq title and established rules for an ongoing relationship between nations; they did not surrender or cede lands. The arrival of Planters created economic, environmental and cultural pressures on the Mi'kmaq. A census of 1763 by Isaac Deschamps stated that the following Mi’kmaq men plus 19 unnamed women and 41 children hunted along the Kennetcook River: Joseph Nocoot— Captain, Charles Nocoot, Barth. Nocoot, Reni Nocoot, Thomas Nocoot, Jacques Nocoot, Paul Segona, Lewis Nocoot, Paul Briskarone, Charles Segona, Francois Segona, Michel Thoma, Janvier Nocoot, Joseph Thoma, Francois Nocoot, Phillipe Nocoot, Claude Nocoot, Louis Michel. In many instances, the original name was changed to one of French origin, probably arising from family alliance with Acadians. Peace and Friendship treaties negotiated with the British between 1725 and 1761 are still valid today. The treaties recognized Mi’kmaq title and established rules for an ongoing relationship between nations; they did not surrender or cede lands. The arrival of Planters created economic, environmental and cultural pressures on the Mi'kmaq. A 1763 census lists 51 Mi’kmaq; members of Nocoot (now Knockwood), Segona, Briskarone, Thoma, and Michel families along the Kennetcook River from Newport to Kennetcook. A later census listed none, although Mi’kmaq had a summer encampment along Station Road around a hundred years ago, where they made and sold baskets. Mi’kmaq were relocated to “reserves” from 1801 until the 1950s. Much of the land originally allocated was taken from them over time. In 1820 Sipekne'katik, then named Shubenacadie or Indian Brook was founded; Mi’kmaq descendants from this area could have been relocated there. The 1876 “Indian Act” removed powers of self-determination and free movement. Citizenship and voting rights were denied. From 1930-1967, 10% of Mi'kmaq children were forced to attend the Shubenacadie Residential School. Up to 90% of the population has been lost to introduced disease, loss of resources, etc. Today about 3% of Nova Scotia's population is Mi’kmaq. Despite centuries of discrimination, many Mi’kmaq, including Isabelle Knockwood (author of Out of the Ashes), the late Noel Knockwood (spiritual leader and Legislature Sergeant-at-Arms), and Doug Knockwood (Order of Nova Scotia recipient), have greatly enriched the social and economic life here.

Acadians, descendants of early French settlers, farmed in this area from the 1690s until 1755 and local families included Daignon, Godin, Doravon, Borillor, and Girouard in 1701 and Thibaudau, Breaux, Girouard, and Daigle in 1754. Acadians dyked marshland for farming and did not threaten fishing or hunting grounds of Mi’kmaq, who became allies and family members. They were successful farmers who produced most of the food in the province; enough to export to French and British forts and to New England. “Control” of lands changed hands from French to British nine times. Acadians attempted to remain neutral but were used by both sides in the conflict. They agreed to sign oaths of allegiance, but not oaths that required them to fight against French or Mi’kmaq. In October 1755 during the Expulsion or Grand Dérangement, about one thousand Acadians from this area were deported from Pisiquid (Windsor) on four ships under devastating conditions, arriving destitute with no belongings. Many died before reaching shore. Families, including the Girouard and Thibaudaus, were separated with parents and children deported to different New England states. During this time, Mi'kmaq helped to hide Acadians within their communities. Those who hid and were later captured were imprisoned between 1755 and 1762 and were sometimes hired out to Planters and others to repair dykes or farm. The Acadians were permitted to re-establish in seven relatively isolated regions of the province after the Deportation and consequent Migration years ended and The Treaty of Paris was signed in 1763. These include Pubnico Region, Yarmouth Co., Clare Region, Digby Co., Chezzetcook Region, Halifax Co., Larry's River Region, Guysborough Co., Isle Madame Region, Richmond Co., Pomquet & Tracadie Region, Antigonish Co., and Cheticamp Region, Inverness, Co. Today just under 4% of Nova Scotia's population is Acadian. Acadians, whose first language is French, make up the majority of the population in Clare, in sections of Argyle, in Isle Madame and Chéticamp.

After the expulsion of Acadians created a farming crisis, Governor Charles Lawrence offered “free” land, often still occupied by Mi’kmaq, to Protestants willing to move to Nova Scotia. Planters (farming settlers, often descendants of Pilgrims or Puritans) arrived around 1760 mostly from Rhode Island and settled here. The arrival of Planters created economic, environmental and cultural pressures on the Mi'kmaq. In the 1750s, Rhode Island was the major slave market in the American colonies. Its lacked sufficient land to support its growing population and many farming families took up Governor Lawrence's offer, with the understanding that they could maintain religious freedom and elected representation. Early Planter Shubael Dimock, for instance, was escaping religious persecution because of his involvement with the Separate Baptists. An economy based on subsistence farming and lumbering grew and the population rose to about 2,500 within 100 years. In the mid-1800s, shipbuilding in the area also grew and brought brief prosperity. Farmers produced livestock, grains, vegetables, and fruit for the Halifax and other markets, including exporting apples to England. Hants County's 1820 cattle exhibition was based in Scotch Village. Farm products and barite from local mines were transported through a railroad station. Three inns, two mills, a tannery, a blacksmith shop, two schools and churches, a railway station, a shoemaker, a general store, a carriage shop, a shipbuilding shop, and many viable farms were all active during Scotch Village's more prosperous times. As Nova Scotia's economy declined after 1885, people began relocating to USA or other parts of Canada. Railway service declined during the 1960s and ended in the 1980s and the two schools eventually closed. In the mid-1900s, a Scotch Village farm with 25 cattle and 100 chickens could provide all a family needed, including produce and preserves from the farm, firewood from the woodlot, and extra meat from hunting. Cash from milk and egg sales paid taxes and monthly co-op store purchases. Today the land is used for cattle grazing, home vegetable growing, and lumber or firewood harvesting. The second oldest Baptist church in the Maritimes, Newport Baptist Church, still operates and is the only remaining institution in the community.

People of African descent have been in the Bay of Fundy area for over 400 years. Mathieu da Costa, first known Black person in Canada, was interpreter for French in Acadia in early 1600s. Slaveholding dates back to the Acadian period and 266 enslaved Africans were among the inhabitants of Louisbourg. Planters, arriving mostly from the New England area, brought about 200 enslaved Africans to Nova Scotia. One African woman and girl are listed in Newport 1767 census, possibly brought by William and Susanna Haliburton who emigrated from Boston in 1761. Numerous African-Nova Scotians have lived in communities along the Avon River both as enslaved and free people. In 1776 Peter Shey who had formerly lived at Mount Shey in Scotch Village purchased an enslaved 25 year old woman named Dinah from a Rev. John Breynton of Halifax. The shipbuilding and related trade in the Avon River and Scotch Village areas was connected to the slave-based economy of North America and the Caribbean. Nova Scotia vessels brought dried fish and timber to Caribbean slave-based plantations and traded these for sugar, rum, and molasses, which ultimately were used to purchase more slaves in the trans-Atlantic slave-trade. This is a part of Nova Scotia's history that is seldom shared yet warrants greater awareness, especially as we strive to learn about and overcome today's legacy of slavery and the slave trade. In the 1780s, White Loyalists brought 1,500 enslaved Africans to Nova Scotia, including to Newport, Falmouth, Summerville, Windsor, Rawdon, and Douglas (Kennetcook and Stanley) to work on farms, orchards, in construction, in domestic servitude, etc. African people who were enslaved tended horses at the stage coach inn at Newport Corner in the 1800s. Up to 3,000 free Black Loyalists arrived in the province in 1780s during the American Revolution, followed by about 600 Maroons from Jamaica. Many African-Nova Scotians later left the province for New England and elsewhere, including 1,150 to Sierra Leone due to harsh treatment. After the War of 1812 between Great Britain and the United States, about 2,811 Black Refugees arrived in the province and settled in many communities around Halifax as well as in the Windsor Plains area, where they worked in many trades, farmed, quarried gypsum, and established a school and a church, which after 205 years, still serves the community. Before slavery was abolished throughout the British Empire in 1834, African-Nova Scotians contributed skills, knowledge, and labour under dreadful conditions that enriched “owners” and communities. Many tried to escape, some were sold to the West Indies and elsewhere, families were divided through sale, and some were indentured or maimed or slain. Despite centuries of discrimination and hardship, people of African descent from Hants County have contributed immensely to the economy and culture of Nova Scotia. In 1859 William Hall of Horton Bluff on the Avon River was the first Black and the first Canadian sailor to receive the Victoria Cross. Charles Spurgeon Fletcher, a Windsor native and a uranium expert became Harvard University's first black professor around 1935. Dr. George Elliott Clarke, Canadian Parliamentary Poet Laureate (2016-2017), among other notable people, comes from Windsor Plains.

Today this rural community of farm and woodland, pasture and reclaimed marshland is populated primarily by descendants of the Planters and more recent arrivals. The economy is based on farming (grazing cattle, selling hay, and subsistence farming) and small home-based industries (Gold Island Bakery, "Garden Folks", etc.)
