= Kennetcook =

Community in Nova Scotia, Canada

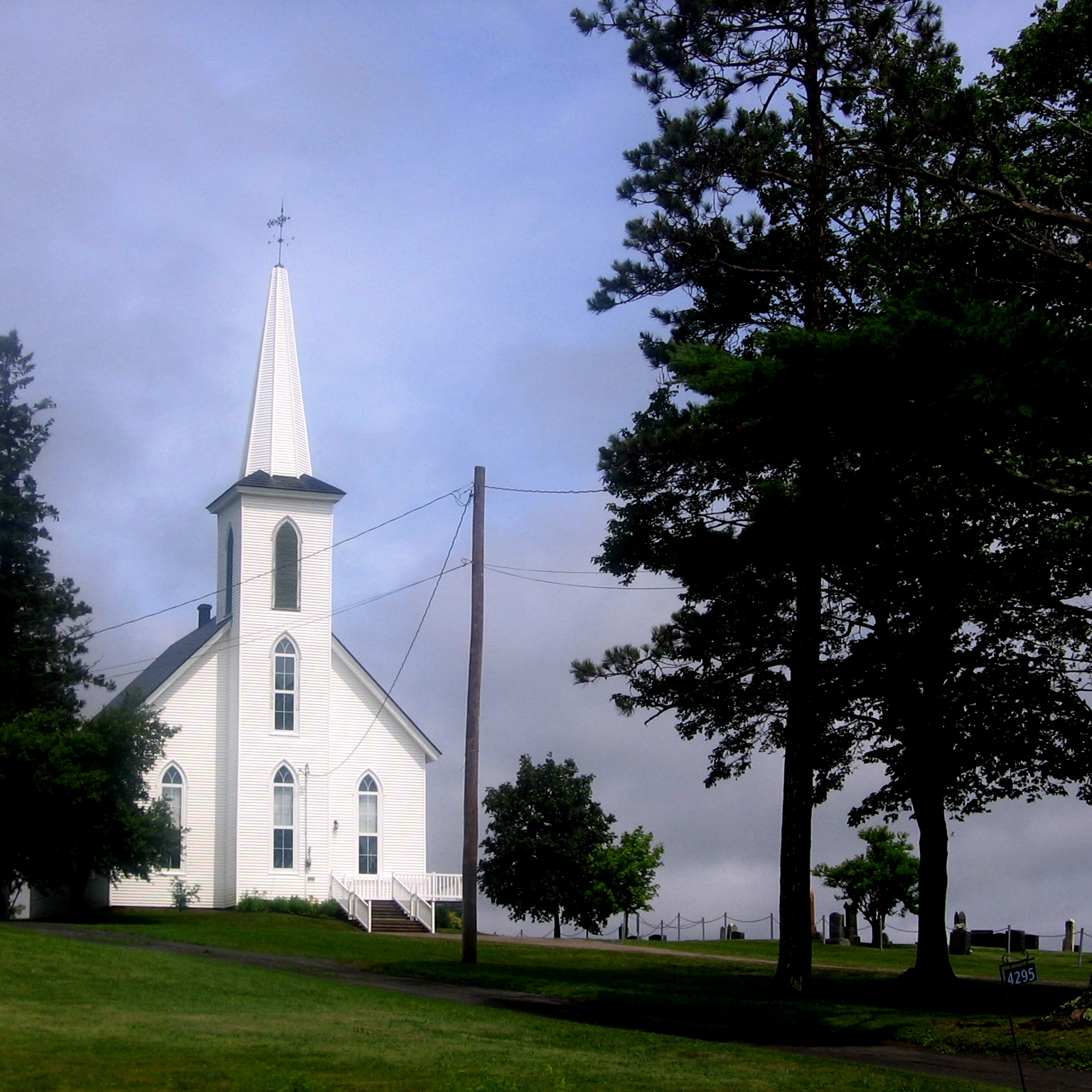
- Church in Kennetcook

- Location in Nova Scotia
- Coordinates: 45°10′40″N 63°43′17″W
- Country: Canada
- Province: Nova Scotia
- County: Hants County
- Municipality: East Hants Municipality
- Time zone: UTC-4 (AST)
  - Summer (DST): UTC-3 (ADT)
- Canadian Postal Code: B0N
- Area code: 902
- Telephone Exchange: 883
- NTS Map: 011E04
- GNBC Code: CASVC

Kennetcook is an unincorporated community in the Canadian province of Nova Scotia, located in East Hants Municipality in Hants County.

== History ==
The community takes its name from the Kennetcook River, and the name is believed to come from a Mi'kmaq word meaning "The Place Further Ahead" or "The Place Nearby." The river was an important canoe and portage route for the Mi'kmaq, connecting the Piziquid (Windsor) area with the canoe routes and settlement areas along the Shubenacadie River. A trail from Halifax to the Acadian settlements at Noel on the Minas Basin crossed the Kennetcook River at a ford near the site of the village, making it an early crossroads.

After the American Revolution, the village was part of the Douglas Township and was settled by the troops of the 84th Regiment of Foot (Royal Highland Emigrants).

Joseph Salter, the noted shipbuilder and first mayor of Moncton, New Brunswick, was born in Kennetcook in 1816.

In 1901, the Midland Railway was built through the village enhancing the crossroads as a retail and service centre for the area. Kennetcook grew to host a hotel by the station, a bank, and several stores. The Midland Railway was acquired by the Dominion Atlantic Railway in 1905, and later by the Canadian Pacific Railway. Canada Pacific added additional rail traffic and began shipping farm products and lumber from Kennetcook to Windsor and Truro. Highway construction after World War II would undermine railway traffic, leading to the end of passenger and regular freight service in 1979 and the removal of the railway in 1983. A covered bridge spanned the Kennetcook River until 1967. This was the last covered bridge in Nova Scotia.

== In literature ==
Sir Charles G.D. Roberts wrote a fictional story about a Mi'kmaq raid on British settlers in Kennetcook, entitled "Raid on Kennetcook" (alternatively "Raid from Beauséjour"), set just before the 1755 Expulsion of the Acadians. Roberts wrote the story in 1894 while he worked at University of King's College, which was then located in Windsor, Nova Scotia.

In 1953, Canadian poet Alden Nowlan graduated from the Folk School located in the Kennetcook Hotel (present-day Law Office).

== Notable residents ==
- Wyatt Sanford, 2020 and 2024 Summer Olympic Games participant (Boxing)
