= Hector Maclean (politician) =

Canadian politician

Hector Maclean (May 24, 1751 – 20 April 1812 at Halifax) was an English-born soldier, farmer and political figure in Nova Scotia. He represented Hants County in the Nova Scotia House of Assembly from 1793 to 1799.

He was born at Golden Square, London. Maclean served as a lieutenant in the 84th Regiment of Foot (Royal Highland Emigrants) in the American Revolution, fighting in the Battle of Eutaw Springs (at which he kept a journal). He later settled in Nova Scotia after the regiment was disbanded. In 1789, he married Elinor Margaret Mowet. He received a grant of land in Douglas township in Hants County.
