= Kennetcook River =

Coordinates: 45°2′16″N 64°2′39.1″W

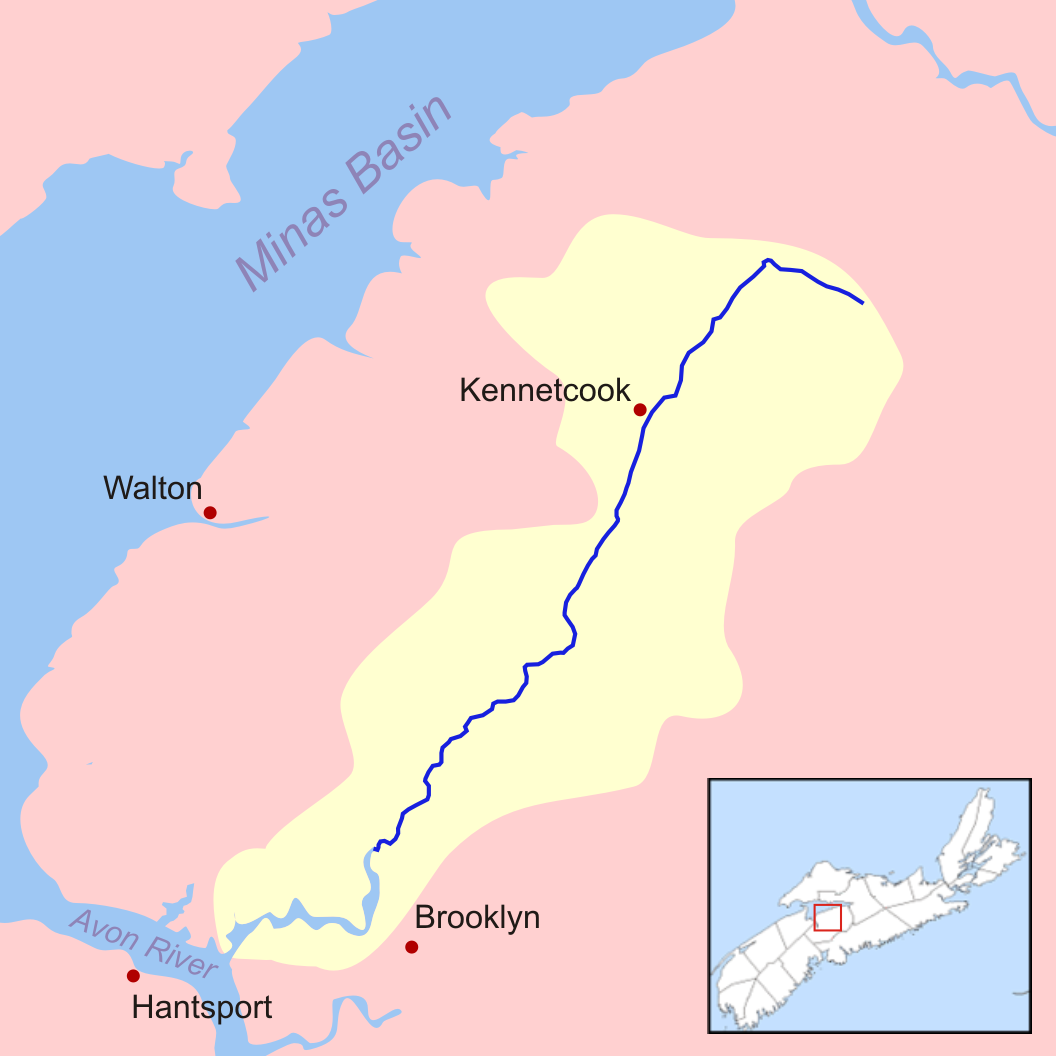
- Kennetcook River

Location
- Country: Canada
- Province: Nova Scotia

Physical characteristics
- Mouth
  - location: Confluence with the Avon River
  - elevation: sea level
- Length: 45 km (28 mi)
- Basin size: 1,125 km^{2} (434 sq mi)

Basin features
- Progression: Avon River—Minas Basin—Bay of Fundy

The Kennetcook River is a river that flows through Hants County, Nova Scotia. From headwaters near the mouth of the Shubenacadie River, the Kennetcook traverses about 45 kilometres of mostly rural terrain, discharging into the Avon River at Windsor. The Kennetcook cuts through fossiliferous limestone rocks for part of its length. A tidal river near its mouth, the Kennetcook experiences a tidal bore which may be seen at Scotch Village. It is a known salmon river popular with anglers.

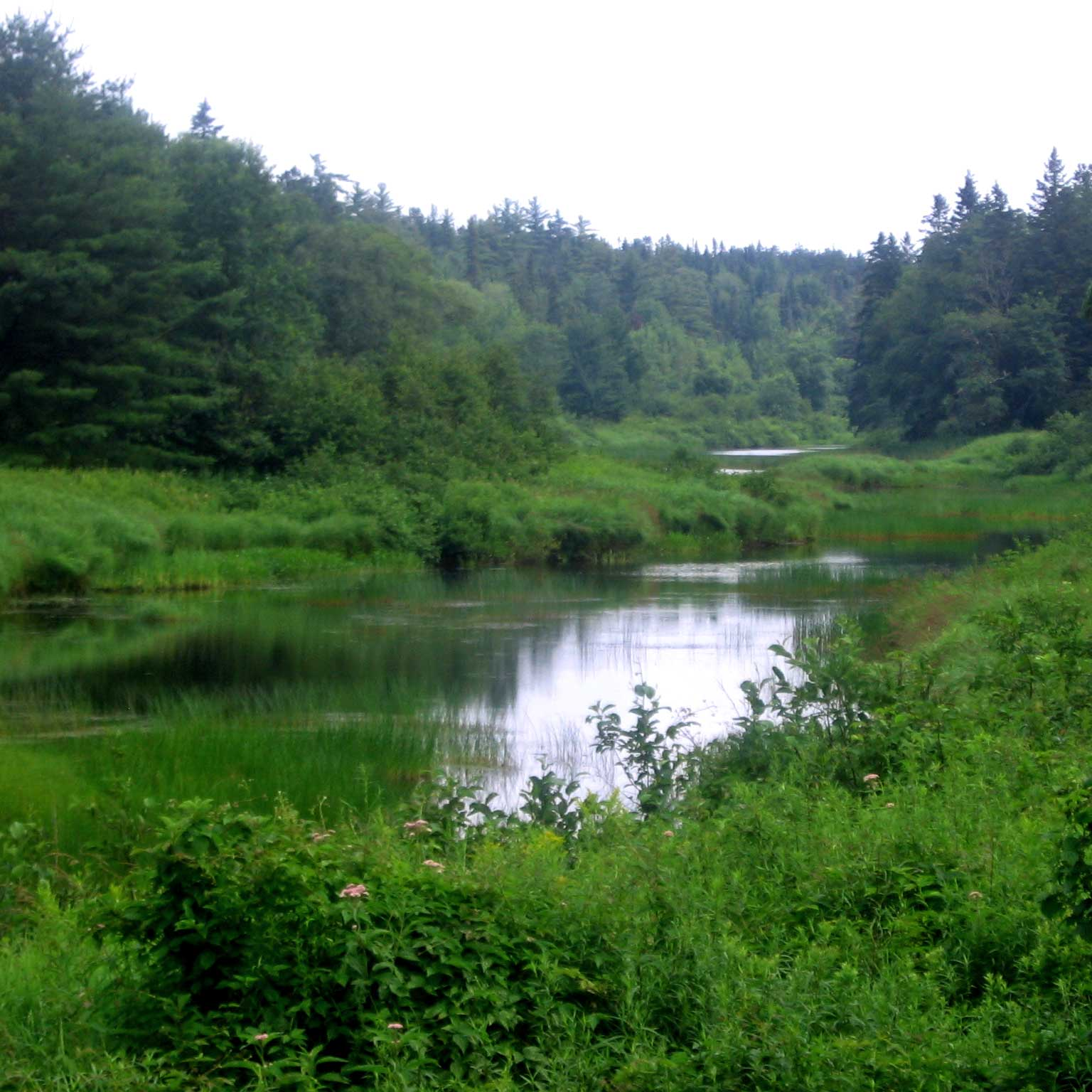
A quiet pool on the Kennetcook River

The village of Kennetcook takes its name from the river, which is a Mi'kmaq word meaning "the place ahead". It was known to the Acadians as Quenetcou. A covered bridge over the river in Kennetcook was the last in Nova Scotia. It was replaced in 1967.

Nova Scotia Route 236 follows the river for much of the river's length, and the Dominion Atlantic Railway used to parallel the river on its northern side.

== See also ==
- List of rivers of Nova Scotia
