= 77th Regiment of Foot (Montgomerie's Highlanders) =

British Army regiment that fought in North America

- Active: 1757–1763
- Country: Kingdom of Great Britain
- Branch: British Army
- Type: Infantry
- Size: two battalions
- Nickname(s): Montgomerie's Highlanders
- Colors: Green facings and white lace.
- Engagements: Seven Years' War; Pontiac's War

Commanders
- Notable commanders: Archibald Montgomerie

The 77th Regiment of Foot (Montgomerie's Highlanders) was a Highland Scots Regiment raised in 1757. The 77th Regiment was one of the first three Highland Regiments to fight in North America. During the Seven Years' War, the regiment lost 110 soldiers and 259 were wounded.

== History ==
The regiment was raised at Stirling by Major Archibald Montgomerie as the 1st Highland Battalion and ranked as the 62nd Regiment of Foot in 1757. Formed under a plan to increase the loyalty of the Highlanders to the Crown by sending 2,000 Highlanders to fight in North America, the battalion ultimately included thirteen companies with 105 enlisted men each for a total of 1,460 men with 65 sergeants and 30 pipers and drummers. The battalion was drawn from the Montgomery, Stuart, Fraser, MacDonald, Cameron, Maclean, and MacPherson clans. Montgomerie recruited the first ten companies in 1756 and an additional three in 1757. The first ten companies departed Cork on 30 June 1757 to reinforce the garrison of Charleston, arriving there on 3 September. At Charleston, 200 soldiers who were from the Scottish Lowlands were transferred to the Royal Americans. The three new companies, meanwhile, were sent to Philadelphia and arrived there on 22 April 1758, moving to Carlisle in May. The rest of the battalion was transported to Philadelphia and debarked there on 8 June. The battalion was renamed the 77th Regiment of Foot (Montgomery's Highlanders) in June 1758.

The regiment took part in the Forbes Expedition across Pennsylvania in 1758. A detachment of 317 officer and men the regiment participated in the Battle of Fort Duquesne on 14 September 1758, 131 of whom were killed or captured, including Major James Grant. 186 survivors rejoined the main regiment under Colonel Henry Bouquet and participated in the capture of Fort Duquesne on 24 November, 1758.

In 1760, six companies participated in a campaign against the Cherokee under the command of the regiment's colonel, Archibald Montgomery. Ten Cherokee towns were destroyed in three days. However, Montgomery's force was defeated on June 27, 1760 at the Battle of Echoee. While Montgomery took the bulk of the army back to Charleston, 120 of the 77th were left at Fort Prince George until April, 1761.

The 120 men in South Carolina sailed for the West Indies in June 1761 where it joined the remainder of the regiment sent from New York. They took part in the Invasion of Martinique in January 1762 and the siege of Havana in June 1762.

The Regiment was disbanded later in the year.
